= New Inn, County Laois =

New Inn
- Village
- Location in Ireland
- Coordinates: 53°05′N 7°11′W
- Country: Ireland
- Province: Leinster
- County: County Laois
- Time zone: UTC+0 (WET)
  - Summer (DST): UTC-1 (IST (WEST))

New Inn is a hamlet in County Laois, Ireland. It is near Emo on the R445 regional road just off the M7 motorway. New Inn lies within the townland of Cappakeel (Irish: Ceapach Chaol), also called Ballymulrony (Baile Uí Mhaoilruanaidh).

== See also ==
- List of towns and villages in Ireland
- Emo Court
