= Rosenallis =

Village in County Laois, Ireland

Rosenallis Ros Fhionnghlaise
- Village
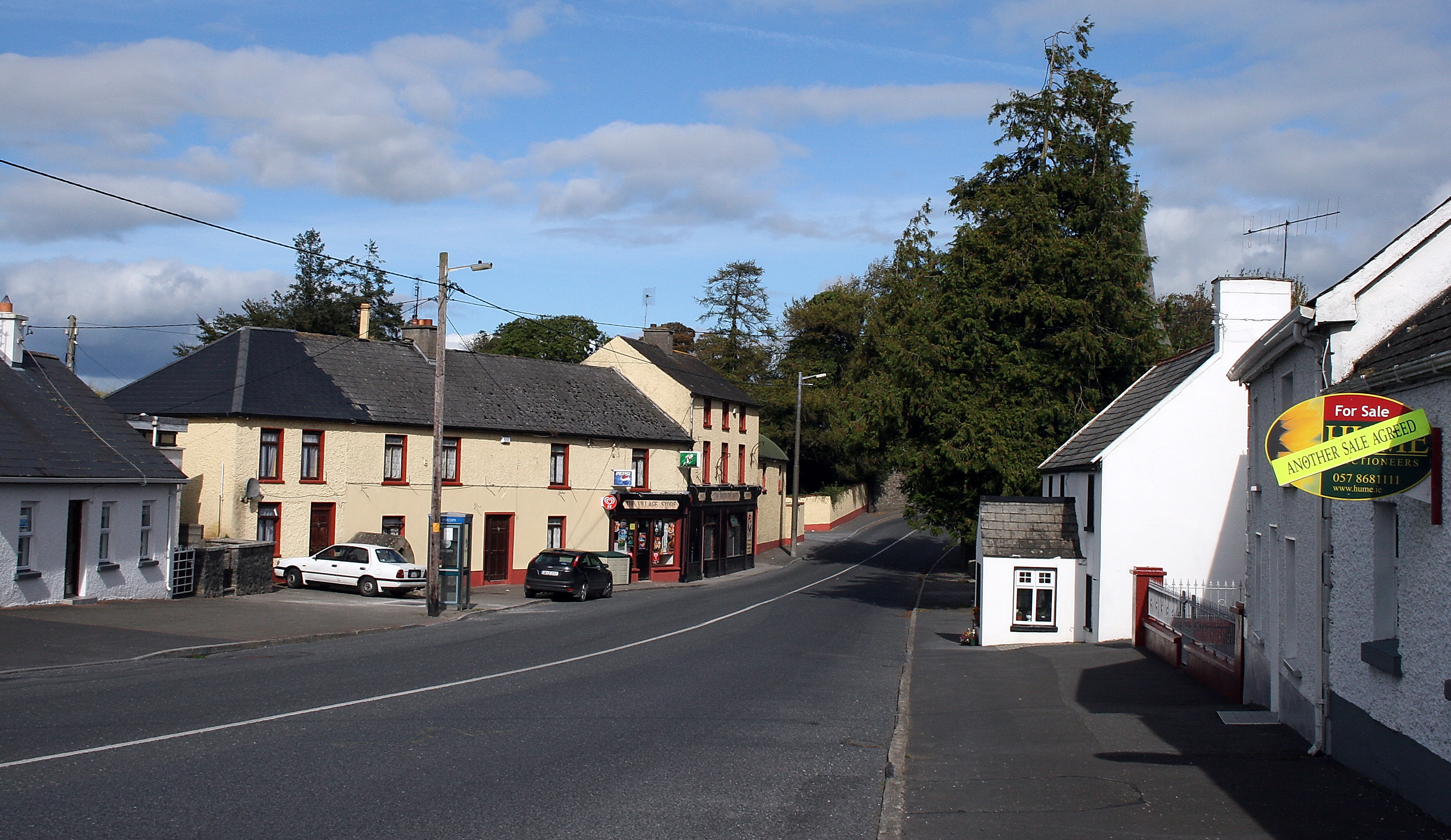

- Location in Ireland
- Coordinates: 53°08′N 7°24′W
- Country: Ireland
- Province: Leinster
- County: County Laois

Population (2002)
  - Rural: 440
- (Entire surrounding electoral division)
- Time zone: UTC+0 (WET)
  - Summer (DST): UTC-1 (IST (WEST))

Rosenallis (historically Rossinallis, from Irish: Ros Fhionnghlaise, meaning 'wood of the clear stream') is a village in north County Laois, Ireland. It is in the foothills of the Slieve Bloom Mountains on the R422 Mountmellick to Birr road, 6 km north-west of Mountmellick. The village is in a townland and civil parish of the same name.

== Demographics ==
In 2002, the population of the village's catchment area was 440 persons, representing an 8.9% increase in population since 1996. The population of the surrounding electoral division increased to 469 by 2011.

== History ==
Rosenallis is important in the history of the Quaker movement, with William Edmundson, founder of the Quakers in Ireland, buried just outside the village in the Friends graveyard. In the same graveyard are the remains of Roger Byrne, who was said to have weighed 52 stone and been Ireland's heaviest man when he died in March 1804. This claim has, however, been disputed.

In his Topographical Dictionary of Ireland (1837), Samuel Lewis described the area: "In the Slieve Bloom Mountains are quarries of a soft white sandstone, which hardens when exposed to the air, and is susceptible of a high polish; it is in great demand throughout the country for chimney-pieces and hearth-stones; a coarser kind is used for flagging. Another peculiarity of these mountains is the fertility of their northern side, which is interspersed with neat farm-houses and cultivated enclosures to its summit, while its southern side is mostly a healthy waste. Iron ore was formerly raised, but is not now. There is a large tract of bog in this district, affording an abundant supply of fuel. Tillage is more attended to than grazing: there are but few flocks of sheep. The chief crops are potatoes, wheat, barley and oats."

The village has two churches (Roman Catholic and Church of Ireland) as well as a village primary school (Rosenallis National School), a community centre, one pub, and a nail salon. The secondary-level schools serving the area are Clonaslee and Mountmellick. Every year the village hosts the "Festival of the Mountain" which is situated in the Festival Field just outside the village.

== Geography ==
The River Barrow, Ireland's second-longest, rises in Glenbarrow, in the parish of Rosenallis.

== Sports ==
Rosenallis GAA is the local Gaelic Athletic Association club. Rosenallis AFC is the local soccer club. It plays home games at its grounds, Johnsgrove.

== See also ==
- List of towns and villages in Ireland
