= R422 road (Ireland) =

Road in Ireland

R422 road
- Bóthar R422
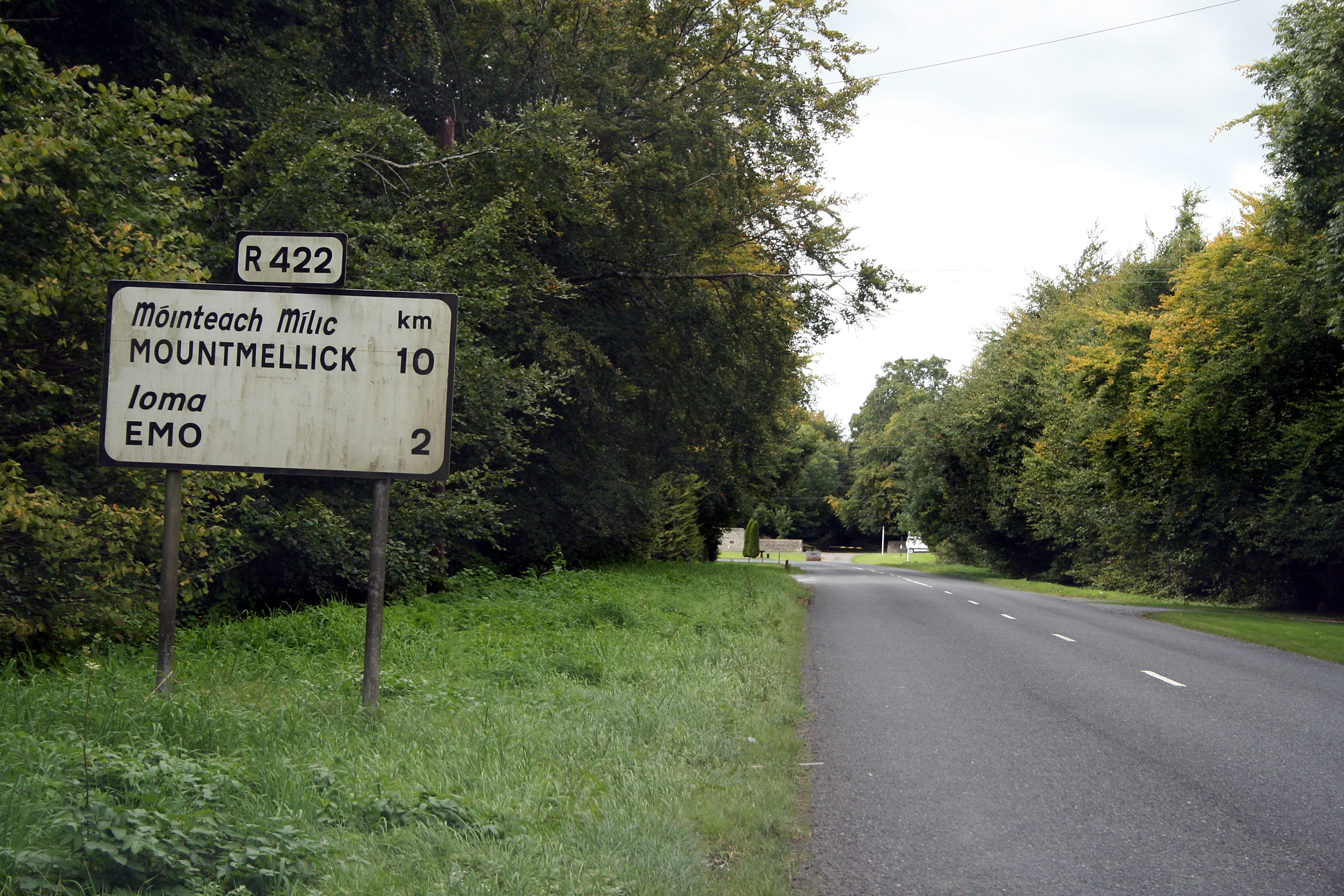
- R422 at New Inn

Route information
- Length: 29 km (18 mi)

Location
- Country: Ireland
- Primary destinations: County Laois; Leave the R421; Clonaslee; Rosenallis; Mountmellick – (N80); (R423); Crosses the Dublin-Cork railway line; (R419); Emo; New Inn, terminates at the R445

Highway system
- Roads in Ireland; Motorways; Primary; Secondary; Regional

The R422 road is a regional road in Ireland, which runs west-east from the R421 north of the Slieve Bloom Mountains to the R445 at New Inn, County Laois. The route is 29 km (18 mi) long.

== See also ==
- Roads in Ireland
- National primary road
- National secondary road
