= R440 road (Ireland) =

Road in Ireland

R440 road
- Bóthar R440
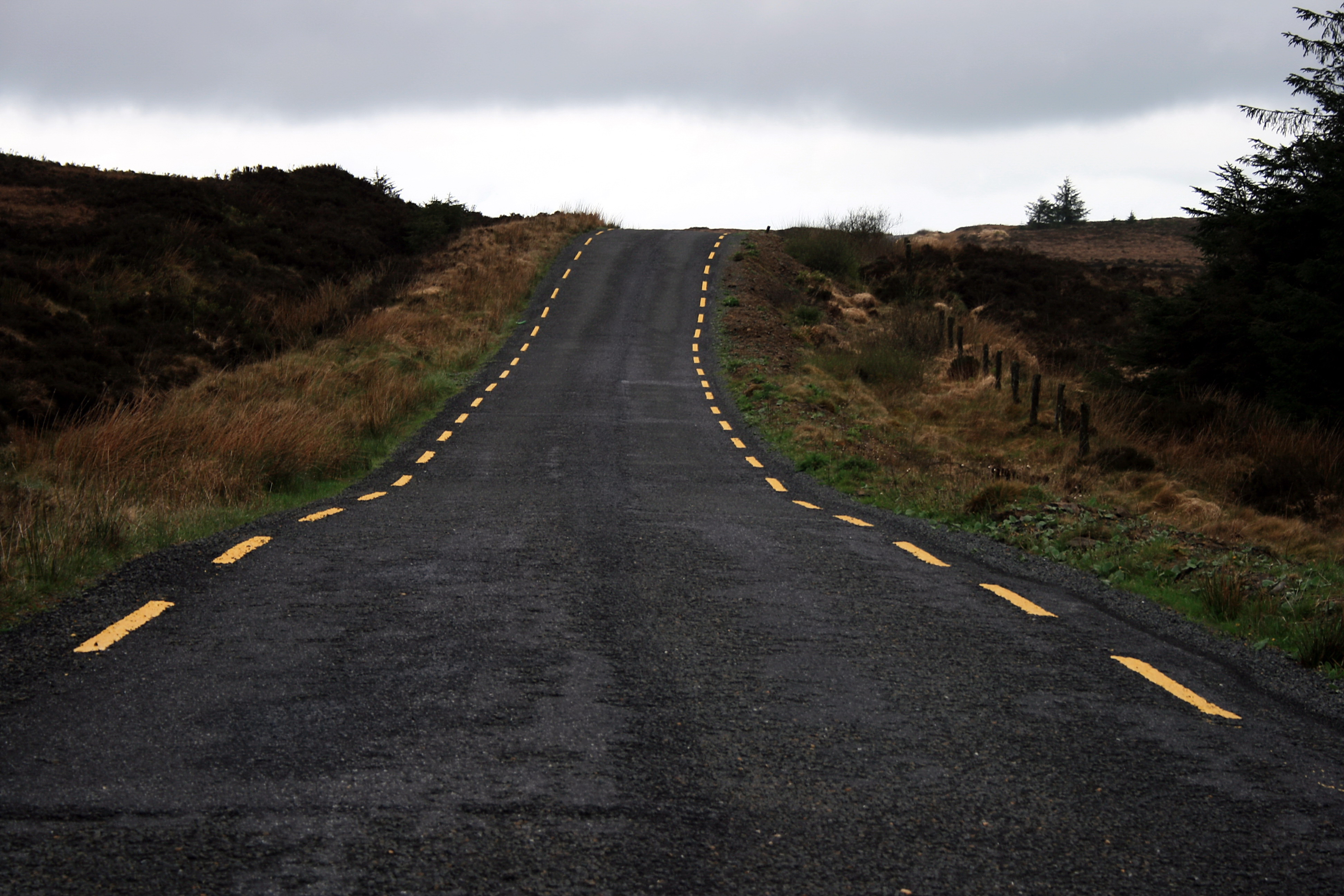
- Crossing the Slieve Bloom Mountains

Route information
- Length: 36 km (22 mi)

Location
- Country: Ireland
- Primary destinations: County Offaly; Birr – leave the N62 passing Birr Castle Demesne; Killyon; Joins the R421; Kinnitty – leaves the R421; Slieve Bloom Mountains; County Laois; Drimmo; Mountrath – terminates at the R423 near the R423/R445 junction

Highway system
- Roads in Ireland; Motorways; Primary; Secondary; Regional

The R440 road is a regional road in Ireland linking Birr, County Offaly and Mountrath, County Laois. It passes through the village of Kinnity, County Offaly and from there climbs to the watershed of the Slieve Bloom Mountains north of Stillbrook Hill, crossing at an elevation of 1,503 feet (458 m) into County Laois on the plateau and descending to Mountrath.

The road is 36 km (22 mi) long.

== See also ==
- Roads in Ireland
- National primary road
- National secondary road
