= Killeigh =

Village in County Offaly, Ireland

Killeigh Irish: Cill Aichidh
- Village
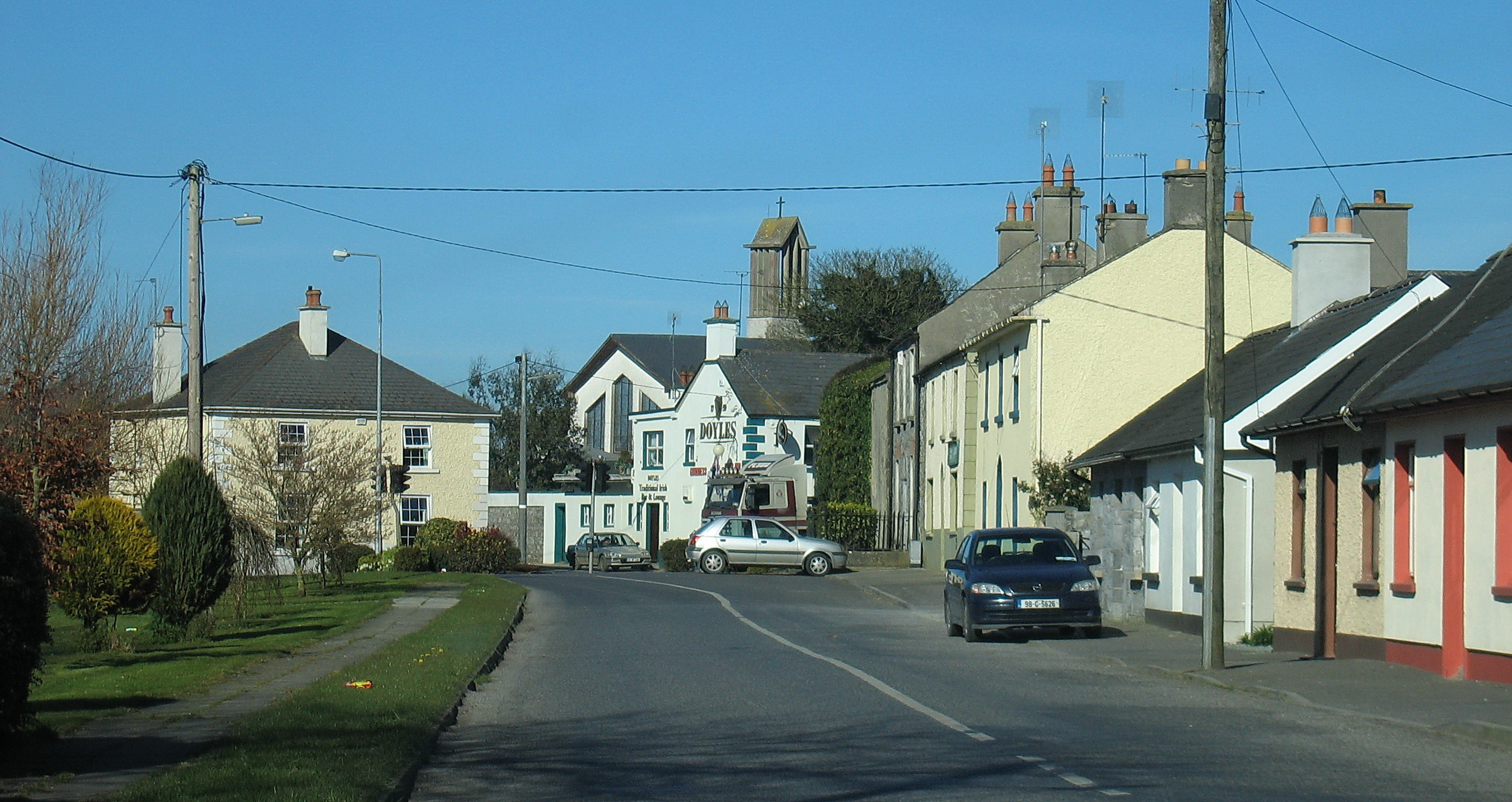
- Killeigh Village

- Location in Ireland
- Coordinates: 53.214°N 7.450°W
- Country: Ireland
- Province: Leinster
- County: Offaly
- Elevation: 99 m (325 ft)

Population (2022)
  - Total: 183
- Irish Grid Reference: N368181

Killeigh (Irish: Cill Aichidh, meaning "church of the field") is a village in County Offaly, Ireland. It is located around 8 kilometres (5 mi) south of the county town of Tullamore, on the N80 national secondary road; the Slieve Bloom Mountains lie to the south. The village of Killeigh, which lies within the civil parish of Geashill, had a population of 183 in 2022.

== Religion ==
An abbey, historically associated with St Sinchell, was reputedly founded at Killeigh (from Irish Cill Aichidh, meaning 'church of the field') in the 6th century. A priory was established by Augustinian nuns in the 12th century, and a Franciscan friary founded in Killeigh in the late 13th century. The friary was dissolved in the 16th century.

The current Church of Ireland church in Killeigh, which incorporates part of the remains of the older friary, was built in the 17th century. It was "substantially repaired" in the 1830s. It lies within the Diocese of Meath and Kildare.

The local Catholic church, which is dedicated to Saint Patrick, is in the Diocese of Kildare and Leighlin. The current church was built in 1971, replacing an older 19th-century building that was demolished in the 1970s. This church is one of three in Killeigh parish. According to its website, Killeigh parish is the largest in the Diocese of Kildare and Leighlin and the second largest Catholic parish in the country.

A holy well and rag tree, associated with St Sinchell, is located in Killeigh townland and contains architectural fragments from the nearby monastic site.

In the 2022 census, approximately 86% indicated that they were Catholic, 1% were of other religions and 13% had no religion or no stated religion.

== Sport ==
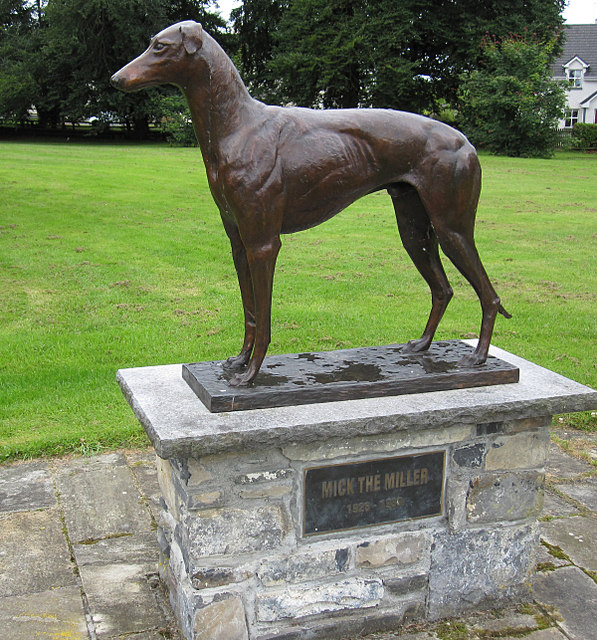
Statue, commemorating 'Mick the Miller', in Killeigh

Killeigh was the birthplace of the racing greyhound 'Mick the Miller', and a statue has been placed on the village green to commemorate this dog.

The local Gaelic Athletic Association club, Clodiagh Gaels, was founded in 2015 following an amalgamation between the clubs representing Killeigh and Killurin. Both clubs had already united at juvenile and underage levels as Na Fianna. The combined club is named for the Clodiagh River.

== See also ==
- List of towns and villages in Ireland
