= R420 road (Ireland) =

Road in Ireland

R420 road
- Bóthar R420
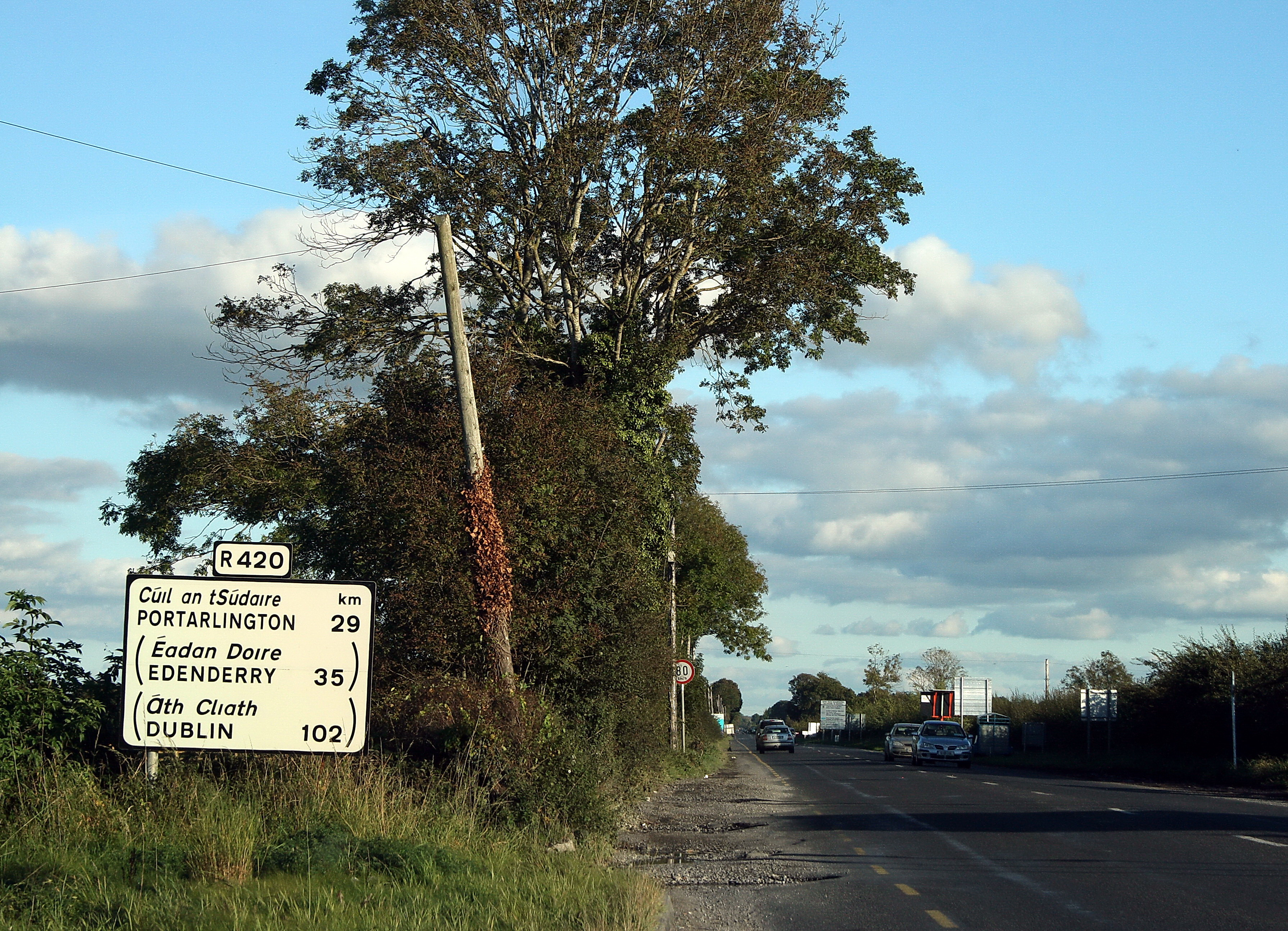
- R420 leaving Tullamore

Route information
- Length: 35 km (22 mi)

Location
- Country: Ireland
- Primary destinations: County Westmeath; leaves R446, east of Moate; County Offaly; Forms junction 6 on the M6; Clara, (R436); Tullamore, (R443), (R421), (N52); (R402); Geashill; Crosses the Dublin-Westport/Galway railway line; Clonygowan; Crosses the Dublin-Westport/Galway railway line; (R423); Crosses a river; County Laois; Portarlington – (R419); (R424); Crosses the Dublin-Cork railway line; Terminates at the R445 west of Monasterevin.

Highway system
- Roads in Ireland; Motorways; Primary; Secondary; Regional

The R420 road is a regional road in Ireland, which runs northwest-southeast from the R446 near Moate in County Westmeath to the R445 just west of Monasterevin. The road travels through the towns of Clara, Tullamore & Portarlington. The route is 35 km (22 mi) long.

== Details ==
The R420 commences at a roundabout junction on the R446 road east of Moate, County Westmeath. From here the road continues in a south east direction where it forms junction 6 on the M6 motorway which connects Dublin and Galway. Continuing southeastwards the route reaches Clara and Tullamore. Much of this section of the route is good quality, with good alignment and wide hard shoulders. The route continues through Tullamore and takes the following route, Clara Road, Kilbride Street, Patrick Street, Church Street and Church road (as far as the roundabout on the N52 bypass of Tullamore). The road continues southeastwards and continues towards Geashill, Clonygowan and Portarlington where it continues through the town as Gracefield Road, Patrick Street, Link Road & Bracklone Street. The route continues for a short distance before joining the R445 road, west of Monasterevin.

Prior to the opening of the N52 bypass of Tullamore the route of the R420 between Tullamore and Moate formed part of the N80 National secondary road. The section of road was downgraded in status with traffic (when approaching Tullamore from the south) now encouraged to take the N52 to Kilbeggan and join the M6 motorway to continue their journey.

== See also ==
- Roads in Ireland
- National primary road
- National secondary road
