= R423 road (Ireland) =

Road in Ireland

R423 road
- Bóthar R423
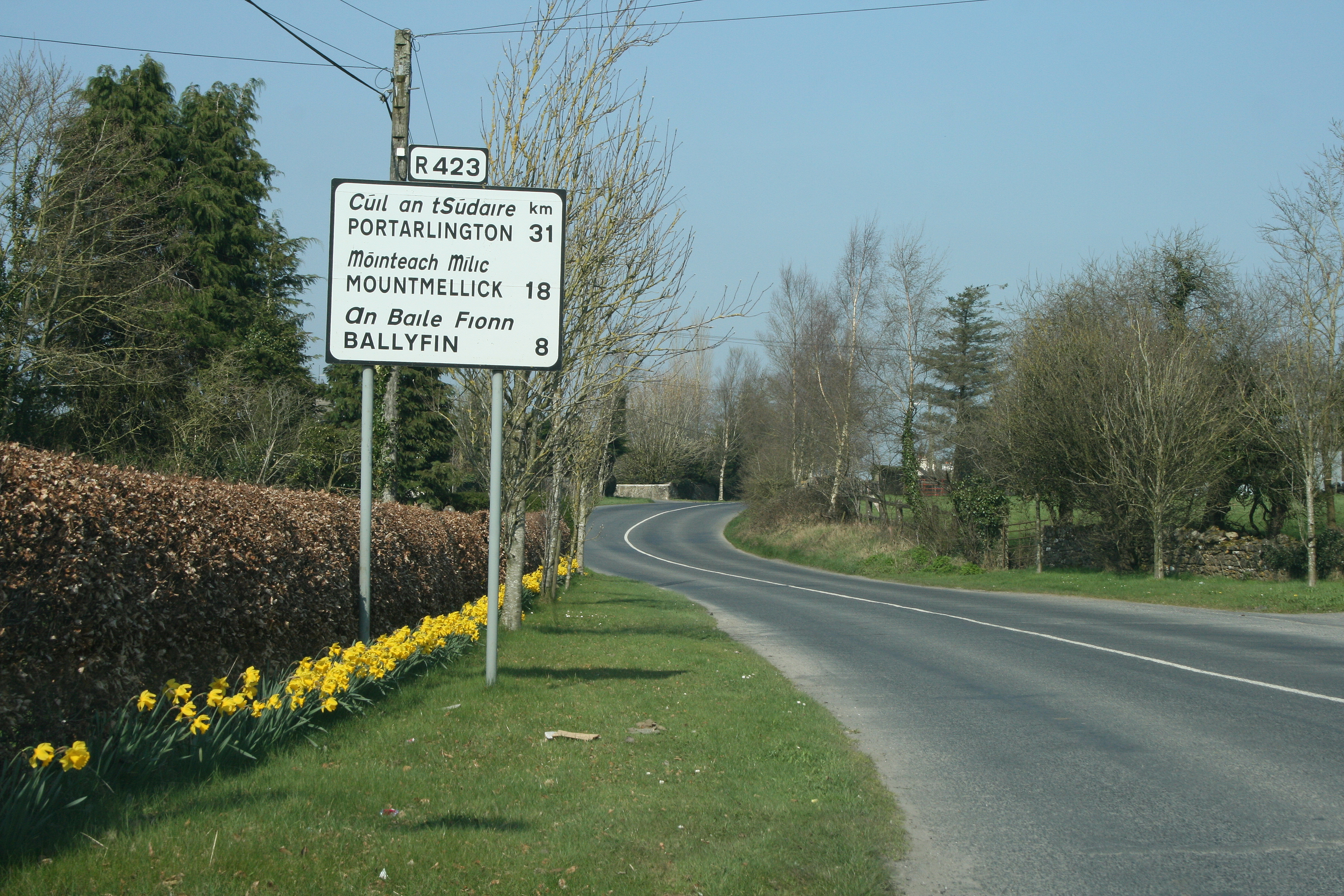
- R423 leaving Mountrath

Route information
- Length: 25.5 km (15.8 mi)

Location
- Country: Ireland
- Primary destinations: County Offaly; Near Portarlington – leave the R420; crosses the Portarlington–Athlone railway line; County Laois; Joins the R422; Mountmellick – leaves the R422 and joins the N80; Leaves the N80; Ballyfin; Mountrath – terminates at the R440 near the R445 junction

Highway system
- Roads in Ireland; Motorways; Primary; Secondary; Regional

The R423 road is a regional road in counties Laois and Offaly in Ireland. The road is in two parts: from Portarlington, County Laois (where the road begins from the R420 road on the Offaly side of Portarlington) to Mountmellick and from the N80 road at Derrycloney townland to Mountrath. The R423 is 25.5 km (15.8 mi) long.

== See also ==
- Roads in Ireland
- National secondary road
