= R421 road (Ireland) =

Road in Ireland

R421 road
- Bóthar R421
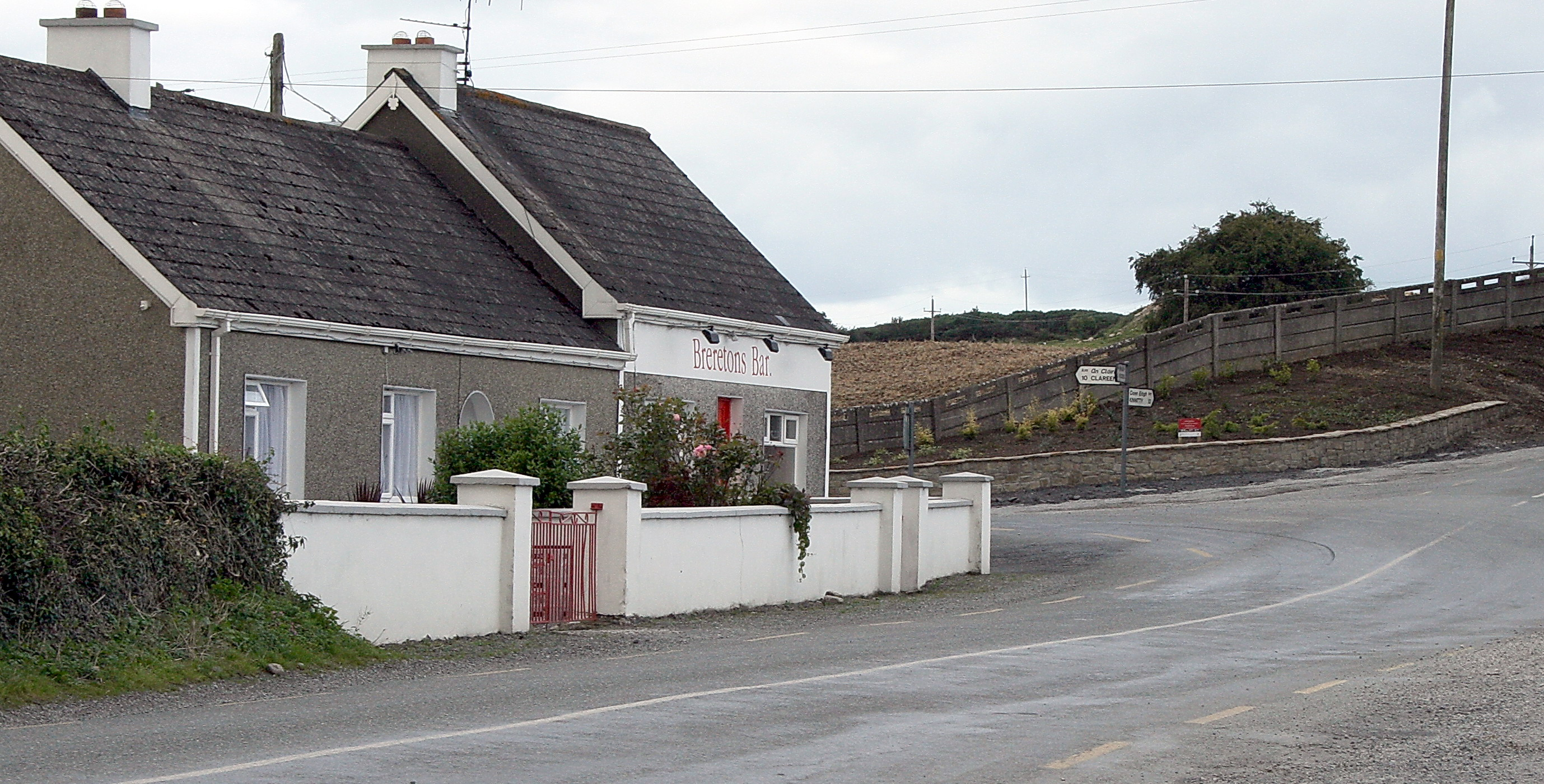
- R421 turns left at Ballybritt, County Offaly

Route information
- Length: 50 km (31 mi)

Location
- Country: Ireland
- Primary destinations: County Tipperary; Roscrea – leaves the R445; (N62 road); Crosses the Limerick-Ballybrophy railway line; County Offaly; Leap Castle; Clareen; Joins the R440; Kinnitty; Leaves the R440; Cadamstown; County Laois; (R422); County Offaly; Killurin; Joins the N52; Charleville Castle; leaves the N52; Tullamore, crosses the Dublin-Westport/Galway railway line; (R443), (R420), terminates at the N52 north of the town.

Highway system
- Roads in Ireland; Motorways; Primary; Secondary; Regional

The R421 road is a regional road in Ireland which runs southwest-northeast from the R445 south of Roscrea to the N52 north of Tullamore. The route also passes through Clareen, Kinnitty and Killurin. The bulk of the route is in County Offaly with small sections in counties Tipperary and Laois. The route is 50 km (31 mi) long.

== Details ==
The R421 commences south of Roscrea at a roundabout junction with the R445 Roscrea bypass. The route continues through the town as the Limerick Road, Limerick Street and Main Street. Continuing in a northeast direction from Roscrea, the route forms a crossroads junction with the N62 National secondary road at the Lourdes Road. A short distance after it crosses the Limerick-Ballybrophy railway line and passes near Roscrea railway station and continues into County Offaly. At Ballybritt there is a sharp turn on the road. To stay on the R421 one must turn left at Ballybrit. The route continues through The Leap & Clareen. The road joins the R440 road west of Kinnitty which continues through the village. The R421 leaves the R440 east of Kinnitty and continues northeastwards through Cadamstown and continues into County Laois. A few kilometers west of Clonaslee in order to stay on the R421 one must turn left for Killurin. The road to Clonaslee continues as the R422 road. The R421 diverts back into County Offaly through Killurin and meets the N52 Tullamore Bypass at a roundabout junction. It leaves the N52 at Charleville Castle grounds and continues in through Tullamore as the Charleville Road, Cormac Street, High Street, Bridge Street, Columcille Street & Arden Road (all formerly part of the main N52 road). The road terminates at the N52 Bypass north of Tullamore.

The current route designation took form following the opening of the bypasses of Roscrea and Tullamore in the 2001 and 2009 respectively. Prior to the opening of the N7 Roscrea bypass (now the R445 bypass following the opening of the M7) the route through the town known as the Limerick Road and Limerick Street formed part of the N7 road. Prior to the opening of the N52 Tullamore bypass the R421 terminated at its junction with the N52 near Charleville Castle (south of Tullamore) with the N52 assuming prominence through the town.

== See also ==
- Roads in Ireland
- National primary road
- National secondary road
