= William Quarter =

Irish American prelate

William J. Quarter Right Reverend
- Bishop of Chicago
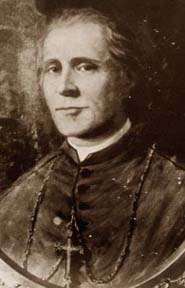
- Church: Roman Catholic Church
- Diocese: Chicago
- See: Chicago
- In office: March 10, 1844 – April 10, 1848
- Predecessor: None
- Successor: James Oliver Van de Velde, S.J.

Orders
- Ordination: September 19, 1829 by John Dubois
- Consecration: March 10, 1844 by John Joseph Hughes

Personal details
- Born: January 21, 1806 Killurin, County Offaly (then King's County), Ireland
- Died: April 10, 1848 (aged 42) Chicago, Illinois, United States

William J. Quarter (January 21, 1806 – April 10, 1848) was an Irish-born Catholic prelate who served as Bishop of Chicago from 1844 to 1848.

== Biography ==
=== Early years ===
William Quarter was born on January 21, 1806, in Killurin, King's County, in Ireland to Michael and Ann (née Bennet) Quarter. The third of four sons, he had three brothers: John, Walter and James Quarter. Walter and James also joined the priesthood, but James died before his ordination.

As a youth, William Quarter studied the classics at private academies in Tullamore, Ireland from 1814 to 1822. While preparing to enter St. Patrick's College, the main Irish seminary in Maynooth, Quarter met a priest who had served as a missionary in the United States. The priest told Quarter that many of the Irish immigrants there were not receiving the sacraments of the Catholic Church due to the shortage of priests and churches. At that point, Quarter decided to enter a seminary in the British Colony of Quebec with the goal of becoming a missionary.

With permission from Bishop James Doyle of Kildare and Leighlin, Quarter sailed from Ireland in April 1822, arriving in Quebec City. He then applied for admission to seminaries operated by the Archdiocese of Quebec and the Diocese of Montreal, but they rejected him because he was only 16 years old.

Quarter then traveled to Emmitsburg, Maryland, in the United States to apply to Mount St. Mary's College, the first seminary in the United States; he was accepted there. While at Mount St. Mary's, Quarter became professor of Greek and Latin, as well as sacristan in 1823. He completed his theological studies in 1829 at Mount St. Mary's and then traveled to New York City.

=== Priesthood ===
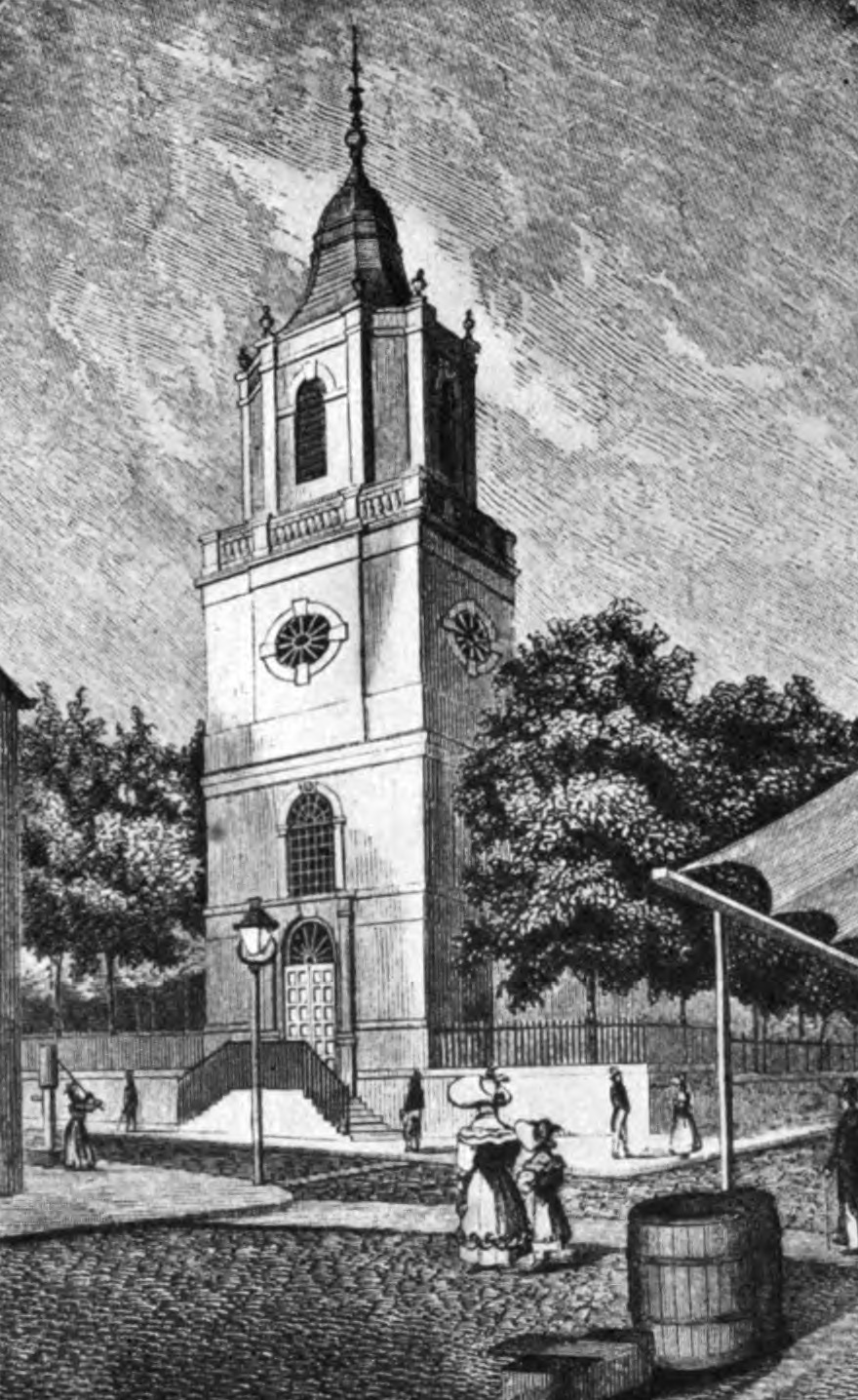
Old St. Peter's Church, New York City (1914 image)

Quarter was ordained into the priesthood by Bishop John Dubois in New York on September 19, 1829, for the Diocese of New York. Since Quarter was only 23 years old, he needed a special dispensation for his ordination.

After his ordination, the diocese assigned Quarter as a curate at St. Peter's Parish in Manhattan, the oldest parish in the state. During the cholera epidemic of the summer of 1832, Quarter ministered to the sick and dying. He placed the children who had been orphaned by the epidemic under the care of the Sisters of Charity.

In 1833, the diocese appointed Quarter as pastor of the new St. Mary's Parish on the Lower East Side of Manhattan. He opened a parish school there. In 1840, Quarter began conversing with Maximilian Oertel, a former Lutheran minister from the Kingdom of Bavaria who had become disillusioned with his church. After receiving spiritual guidance from Quarter, Oertel converted to Catholicism that year.

=== Bishop of Chicago ===
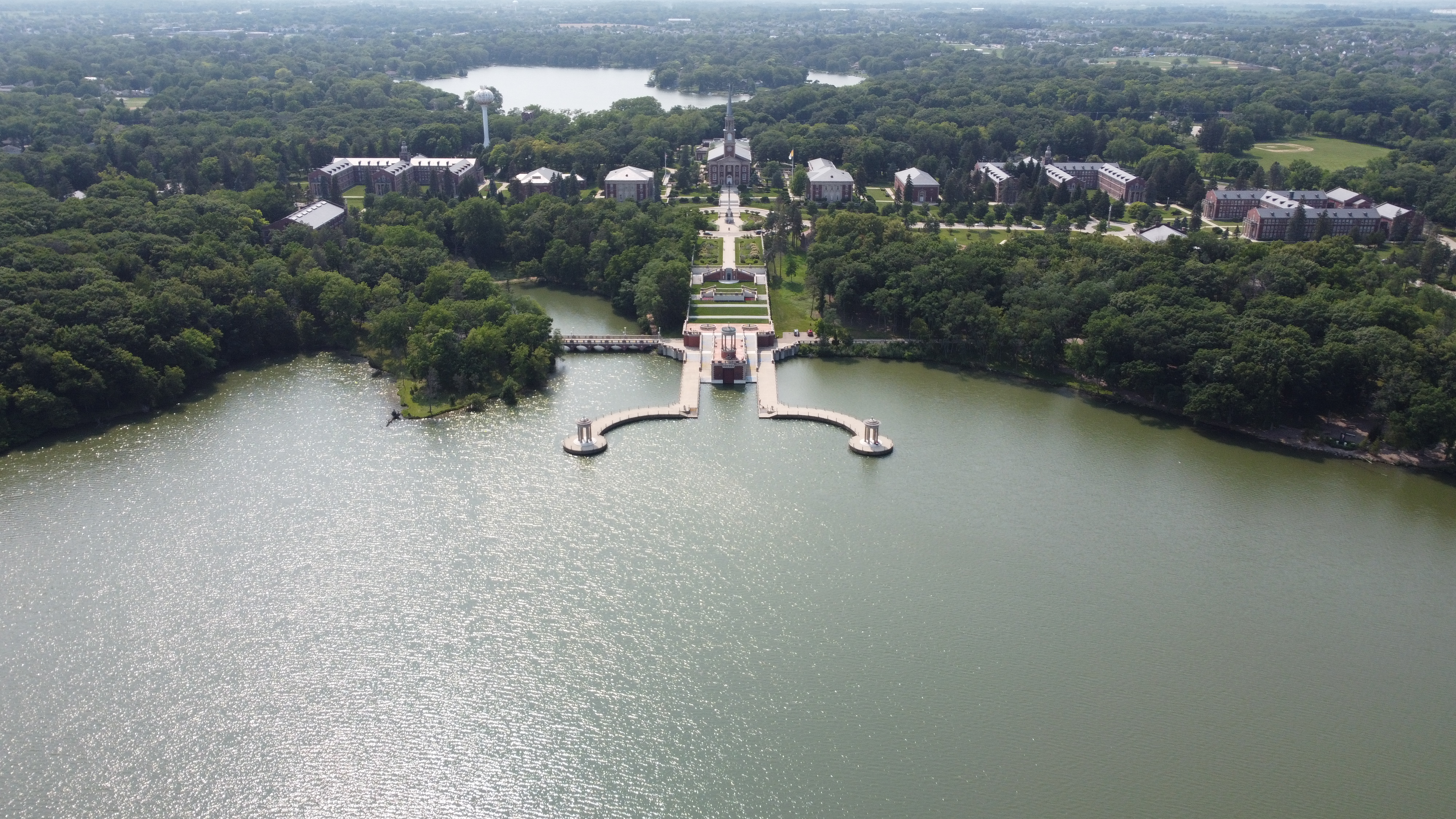
University of St. Mary of the Lake, Chicago, Illinois (2021)

On November 28, 1843, Quarter was appointed the first bishop of the newly erected Diocese of Chicago by Pope Gregory XVI. He received his episcopal consecration on March 10, 1844, from Bishop John Hughes, with Bishops Benedict Fenwick and Richard Whelan serving as co-consecrators, at St. Patrick's Cathedral in Manhattan

While still in New York City, Quarter met Mother Frances Ward, who was arriving with several religious sisters of the Sisters of Mercy from Ireland. He asked Ward to establish a convent in Chicago. Accompanied by his brother Walter (who later became vicar general), Quarter arrived in Chicago on May 5, 1844.

Quarter's most immediate need on becoming bishop was resolving the $5,000 debt passed down to the new diocese. Using his own money and contributions from his family, Quarter paid the diocesan debt. The next big problem was a shortage of priests. Previous to 1843, the eastern part of Illinois was part of the Diocese of Vincennes in Indiana. With the creation of a new diocese in Illinois, the bishop of Vincennes started recalling all his priests back to Indiana. Quarter requested that the bishop delay their return, but it was denied.

To prepare more priests, Quarter in June 1844 opened the University of Saint Mary of the Lake in temporary quarters in Chicago with six seminarians and two professors. This was the first seminary in Chicago. At the end of June, then began touring parishes throughout the diocese. At this time, the diocese included the entire state of Illinois. He went to Joliet, Ottawa and Kaskaskia, ending up in St. Louis, Missouri.

Another problem that Quarter faced was the ownership of church property in the diocese. As in other dioceses, the trustees in many parishes were unwilling to allow bishops to control churches and other parish property. In February 1845, the Illinois General Assembly passed a bill that incorporated the bishop of Chicago, allowing him to "hold real and other property in trust for religious purposes."

In April 1845, Quarter and his brother Walter traveled to New York City to solicit donations from parishes in the diocese for the Diocese of Chicago. Spending three months in New York, Quarter raised $3,0000. Quarter consecrated St. Mary's Cathedral in October 1845, although not all of it was finished.

During 1845, contractors started building a permanent structure for Saint Mary of the Lake. The project ran into trouble later that year when the contractor was jailed for failing to pay a lumber bill. The diocese in January 1846 received a letter that threatened the burning of the building if the workers were not paid. The new campus finally opened in July 1846.

During the 1840s, the majority of Catholics in Illinois were German immigrants. Many of them had been upset that the Vatican had appointed an Irish bishop. In August 1846, three German congregants in the diocese wrote a letter to the Chicago newspapers saying that the pope should appoint a German-speaking coadjutor bishop to run the diocese. Quarter summoned the men to his office and threatened to declare them as schismatics if they continued these actions.

In September 1846, Quarter accompanied six sisters from the Sisters of Mercy from their convent in Pittsburgh, Pennsylvania, to Chicago. This was the first women's religious order to reside in Chicago. That same year, they founded Saint Xavier College for women, the first Catholic institution of higher learning in Chicago. Quarter opened parish schools for boys and girls at St. Mary's Cathedral parish in 1846. These became the first parochial schools in the diocese.

In November 1846, Quarter held the first theological conference in the diocese.

=== Death and legacy ===
On April 10, 1848, Quarter woke up complaining of pain in his heart and his head, then died suddenly; he was 42. Doctors suspected that he had suffered a brain hemorrhage.

Quarter's body was on viewing for two days, attracting many Protestants and city officials as well as Catholics. He was interred in the vault under St. Mary's Cathedral. During his four-year tenure, he founded 30 churches and ordained 29 priests.

== See also ==
- Historical list of the Catholic bishops of the United States

Catholic Church titles
Preceded by none	Bishop of Chicago; 1844–1848	Succeeded by James Oliver Van de Velde
