= Owenass River =

Irish river

Coordinates: 53°08′N 7°19′W

The Owenass River (Irish: An Abhainn Easa) is a river that flows through the county of Laois in Ireland. It is a tributary of the River Barrow.

It has its source at Brisha in the Slieve Bloom Mountains, west of Ballyfin. It enters the town of Mountmellick from the west, passing under the Portlaoise Road and Sarsfield Street and flows north before joining the River Barrow at Strahard north of Mountmellick.

== See also ==
Rivers of Ireland
