= Kinnitty =

Village in County Offaly, Ireland

Kinnitty Irish: Cionn Eitigh
- Village
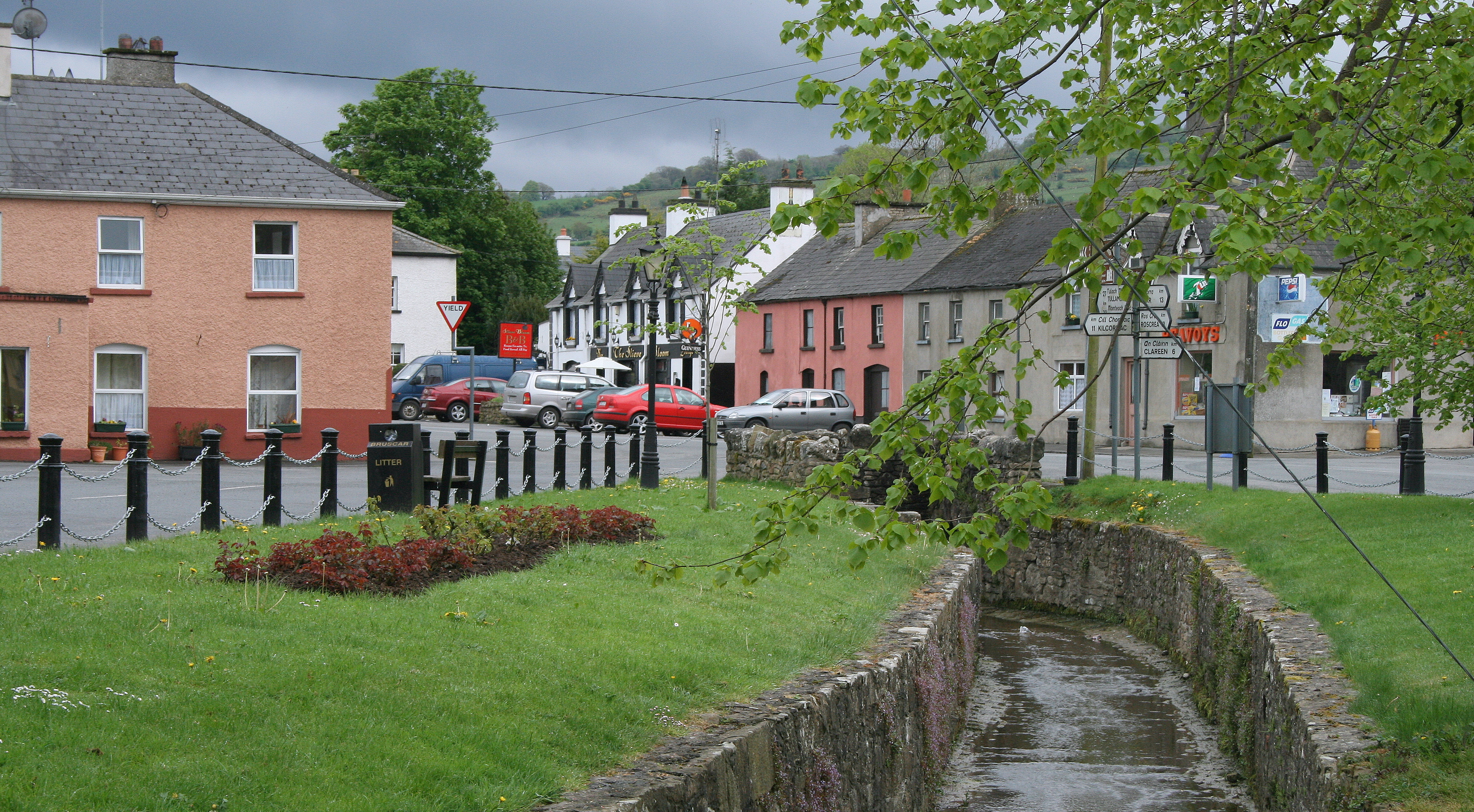
- Kinnity's central village green

- Location in Ireland
- Coordinates: 53°06′00″N 7°43′00″W
- Country: Ireland
- Province: Leinster
- County: Offaly

Population (2016)
  - Total: 381
- Time zone: UTC+0 (WET)
  - Summer (DST): UTC-1 (IST (WEST))
- Irish Grid Reference: N184053

Kinnitty (Irish: Cionn Eitigh) is a village in County Offaly, Ireland. It is located 13 km east of Birr on the R440 and R421 roads. The village is in a civil parish of the same name.

== Name and location ==
The village derives its name from the myth that the head of an ancient princess is buried beneath the village, Ceann Eitigh being the "Head of Eiteach" in the Irish language - where Eiteach is the name of the princess. The village is situated at the foot of the Slieve Bloom Mountains in the ancient kingdom of Éile.

== Parish ==
Kinnity is also the name of the Roman Catholic parish. The present chapel was built around 1815.

== Amenities ==
Kinnitty is served by a primary school, two churches, two pubs, community centre, a number of retail businesses and a hotel (the modern day use of Kinnitty Castle). The trail head for the Slieve Bloom Mountain biking trails is located in the village of Kinnitty, as is one of the trailheads for the long distance Slieve Bloom Way walking route. Kinnitty Forest or Glenregan Forest is operated by Coillte and is located near the village.

== Buildings ==
There is an unusual pyramid-shaped tomb in the grounds of the St Finian's Church. It was built by the Bernard family who resided in Kinnitty Castle, on the site of St. Finnian's monastery. The 9th century Kinnitty High Cross is located at the front of Kinnitty Castle (now a hotel).

== Notable people ==
- Saint Finan Cam founded a monastery here around the end of the 6th century
- Rex Ingram, the Hollywood director, and his brother, Colonel Francis Clere Hitchcock MC, spent most of their early life here where their father was the parish rector. (The "Old Rectory" now a private home, can be seen from the Roscrea Road opposite the Church of Ireland.)

== See also ==
- List of towns and villages in Ireland
