= Kinnitty Cross =

High cross, County Offaly, Ireland

- Ardchros Chionn Eitigh (Irish)
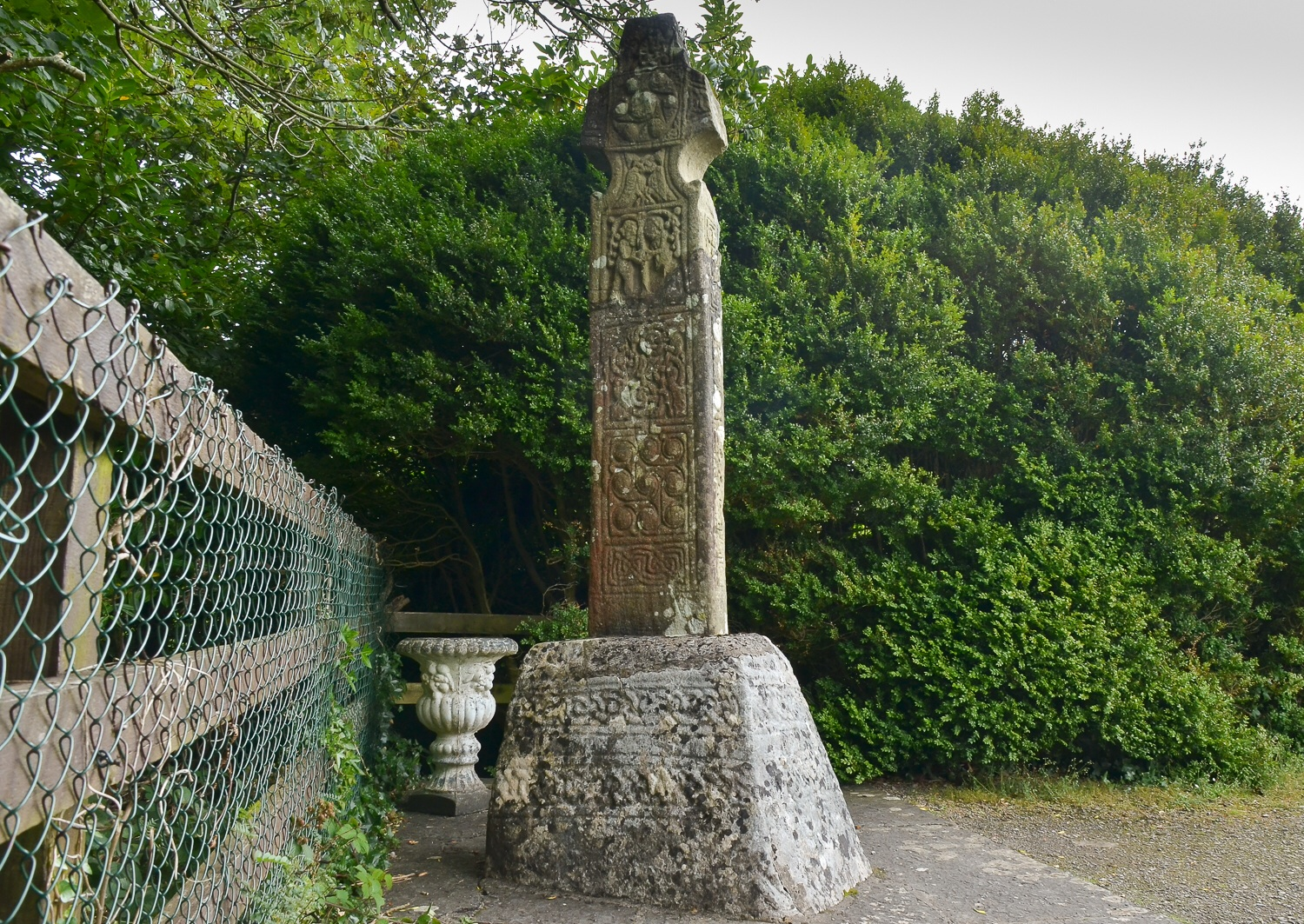

- Location within Ireland
- 53.103000°N 7.697399°W
- Type: High cross
- Location: Castletown and Glinsk, Kinnitty, County Offaly, Ireland

History
- Built: 6th century

Site notes
- Height: 2.4 m (7 ft 10 in)

National monument of Ireland
- Official name: Kinnitty Cross
- Reference no.: 510

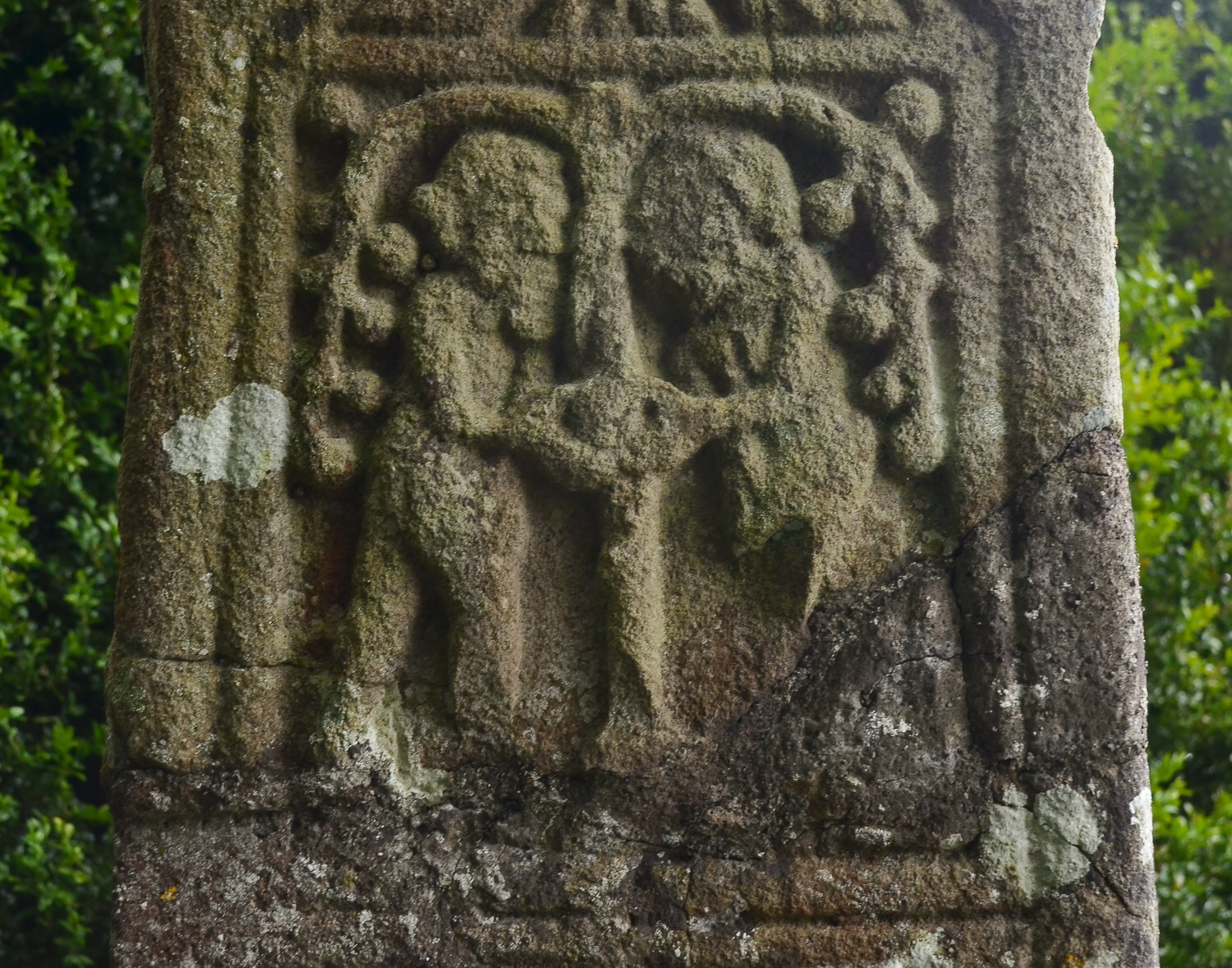
Carved image of Adam and Eve

Kinnitty Cross is a high cross and National Monument located near Kinnitty, County Offaly, Ireland.

== Location ==
Kinnitty Cross is in the grounds of Castle Bernard, built on the west bank of the River Camcor, about 1.5 km (1 mile) east of Kinnitty village.

== History ==
Saint Finnian of Clonard (470–549) built a monastery on the site, and the high cross is associated with this monastery.

Local legend claims that the cross was erected by a St. Colman to commemorate the conversion of his father, Óengus mac Nad Froích (430–489), by Saint Patrick. The cross was covered with carvings in the 9th century by Máel Sechnaill mac Máele Ruanaid (d. 862), High King of Ireland.

== Description ==
The cross is made of sandstone (not of local origin) and stands 2.4 metres (7.9 ft) high. The cross is missing both the arms and top. The south panel has the Crucifixion, the north panel shows Adam and Eve and a nine-spiraled panel near the base.
