= Clonaslee =

Village in County Laois, Ireland

Clonaslee Cluain na Slí
- Village
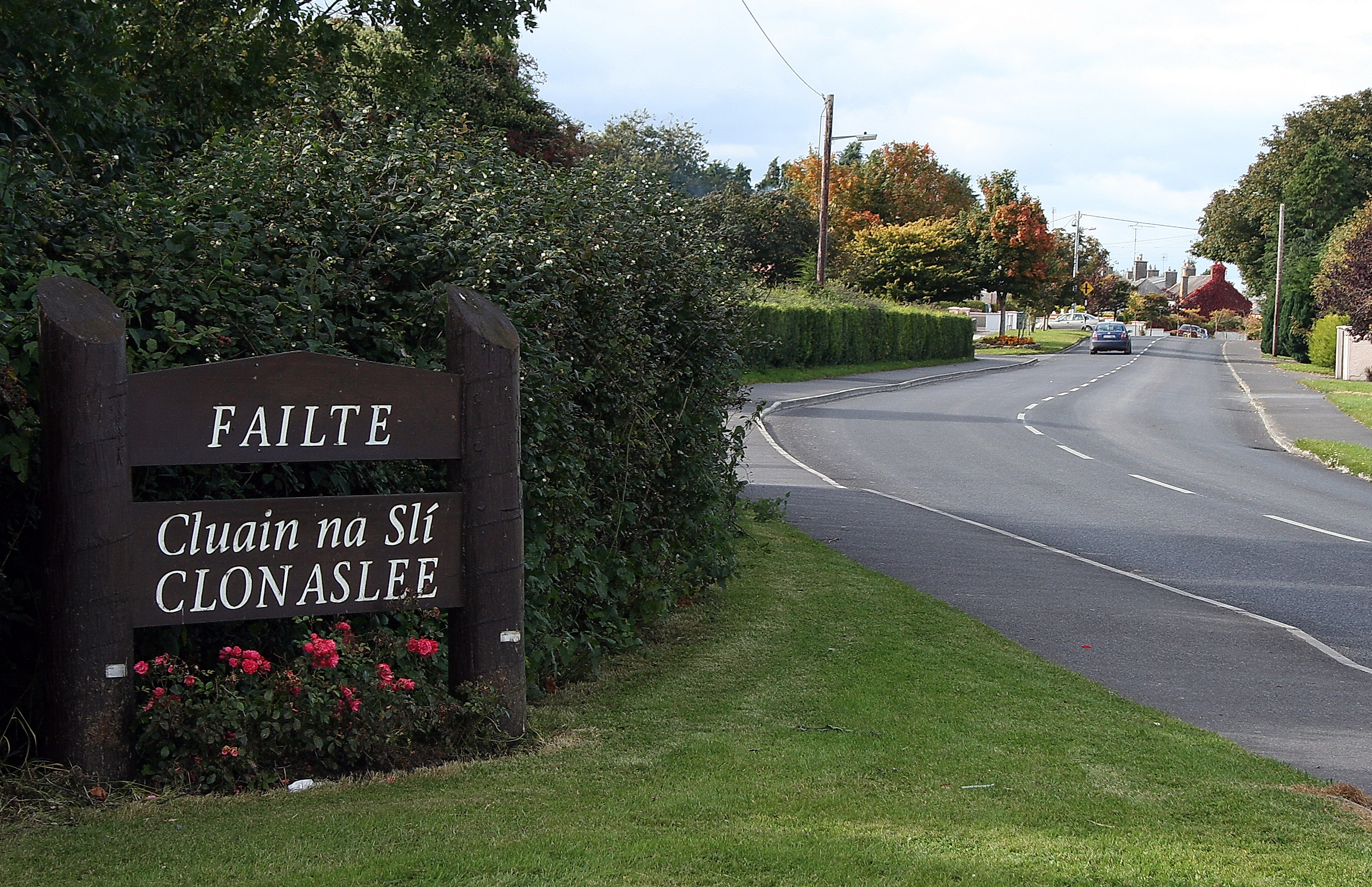
- Clonaslee, R422 heading west into the village

- Location in Ireland
- Coordinates: 53.1488°N 7.5253°W
- Country: Ireland
- Province: Leinster
- County: County Laois

Population (2022)
  - Total: 608
- Time zone: UTC+0 (WET)
  - Summer (DST): UTC-1 (IST (WEST))
- Irish grid reference: N318110

Clonaslee (Irish: Cluain na Slí) is a village in north County Laois, Ireland, situated in the foothills of the Slieve Bloom Mountains on the R422 Mountmellick to Birr road. Clonaslee is approximately 100 km west of Dublin, and is close to the towns of Portlaoise and Tullamore.

As of the 2022 census, the village had a recorded population of 608.

== Name ==
The primary spelling of the name, Clonaslee, is associated by several sources to the Irish Cluain na Slí (translated as "pasture of the way" or "roadside meadow" or similar) and related to the village's location on ancient cross-country route.

Though this is the commonly and officially accepted version, an alternative spelling of the name, Cloneslieu, is associated by some sources to the Irish Cluain na Sléibhe (translated as "the mountain meadow").

The original name of the parish, Kilmanman, from the Irish Cill na mBanbhán or Cill Mheanman (translated as "the church of Manman"), is associated with Saint Manman who founded a church here in the 7th century.

== History ==
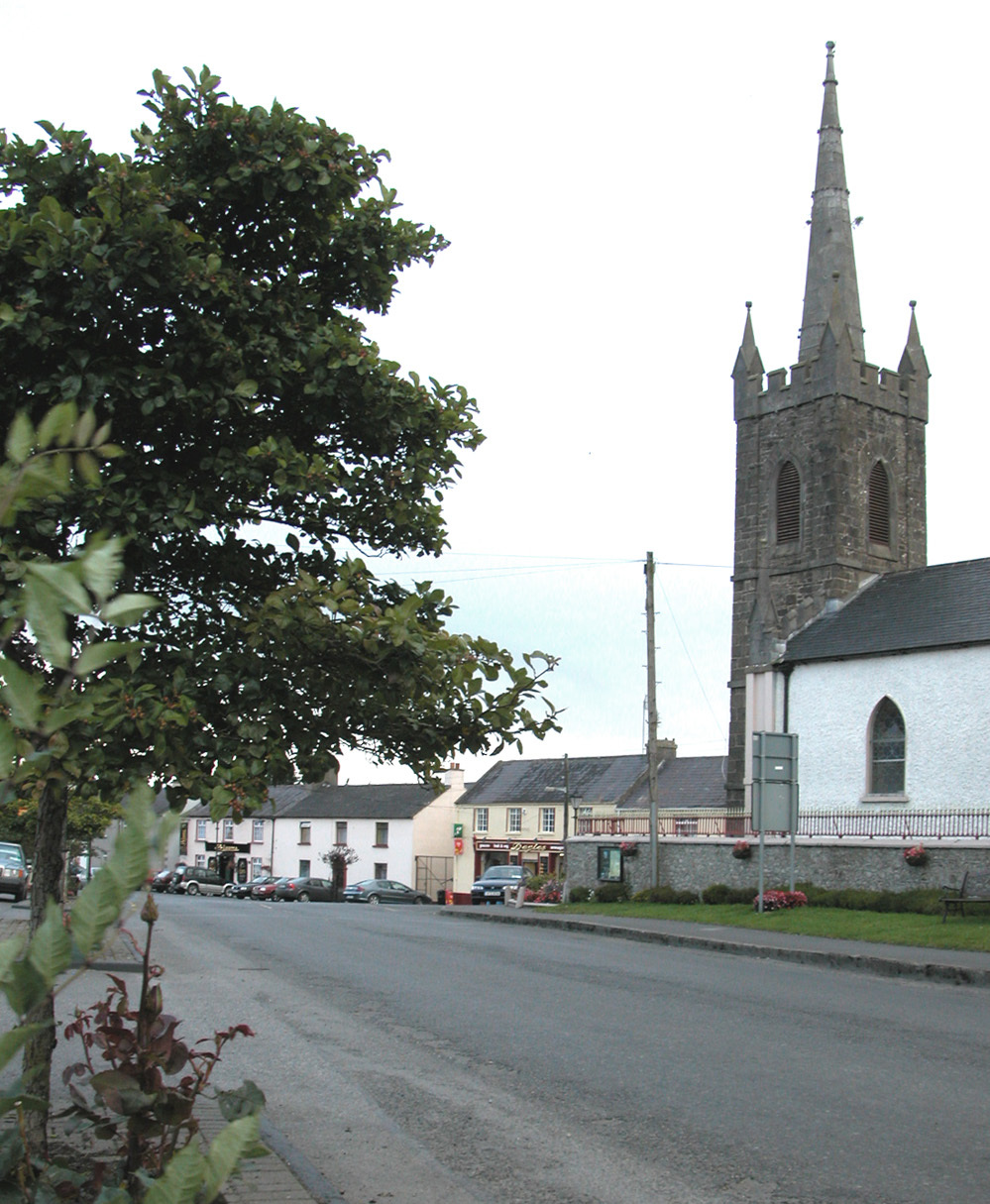
Clonaslee village and church

While earlier archaeological remains suggest more ancient settlement in the area (including a ringfort in nearby Larragan townland), the modern day Clonaslee evolved from its beginnings as an Anglo-Norman town of the late-12th century. At this time the eskers and related landforms gave a great strategic advantage by providing ideal vantage points where mottes and other defensive battlements were constructed. This advantage also had a profound influence on the location of towns and villages throughout the county. From the 12th to 17th centuries, recorded history does not provide much detail on the development of Clonaslee.

The most significant period in the village's growth took place from the 16th century under the influence of the Dunnes of Brittas. This family left their mark on the form and history of the village as evidenced in its planned form and also from a number of ruins in the area. The former residence of a young branch of the family remains in ruins one mile from the village at Clara Hill. Also, near the east bank of the Clodiagh River stand the ruins of Ballinakill Castle, built in 1680 by Colonel Dunne. Throughout the 18th century, Clonaslee prospered due to its location on an important highway across Laois leading onto Munster. The proximity of Brittas - the seat of the Dunnes - was also influential as the power of this family had by now grown beyond that of a native Irish Chieftain. In 1771, Francis Dunne, then head of the Dunne Family, became a Roman Catholic and built a thatched parish chapel in the village. This was located close to the site of the present church.

The Dunne family continued to finance the construction of landmark buildings in the village. The parish church was erected in 1814 under General Dunne (known locally as 'shun-battle Ned' because of his rumoured refusal to fight at the 1815 Battle of Waterloo). The construction of the church was aided by a gift of £800 and a loan of £300 from the former Board of First Fruit. In 1830, the same board donated £50 towards the construction of Glebe House. The village continued to grow quickly from the 1800s to the 1830s. This was largely due to the development of the Mountmellick to Birr road in 1814. This period also saw the arrival of civic facilities such as the post office, police station and other offices of civil administration. The population of the village peaked at 561 inhabitants in 1841. However, in 1901 this fell to a low of 287 persons. As of the 2022 census, the population was 608.

== Amenities ==
Local walks and trails include Slieve Bloom Forest Park, the Giant's Grave, and Brittas Lake and Forest - the latter of which is managed by Coillte. The ruined tower of Brittas Castle, largely destroyed by fire in the mid-20th century, has a gateway from Clonaslee's main street.

Clonaslee–St Manman's is the local Gaelic Athletic Association club.

== Notable people ==
- Gerry Culliton, Irish international rugby union player
- Evelyn Cusack, meteorologist and former head of forecasting at Met Éireann
- Mick Dunne, sports journalist
