= Mick Dunne =

Irish sports journalist and commentator (1929–2002)

- Born: Michael Dunne; 27 May 1929; Clonaslee, County Laois, Ireland
- Died: 11 August 2002 (aged 73); Dublin, Ireland
- Education: Knockbeg College
- Occupations: Sports commentator, journalist
- Employer(s): The Irish Press; Raidió Teilifís Éireann
- Spouse(s): Lilly Fox (m. 1956-2002, his death)
- Children: Eileen Dunne; Úna Dunne; Moira Dunne

Michael Dunne (27 May 1929 – 11 August 2002) was an Irish sports journalist who pioneered television coverage of Gaelic games.

== Birth and childhood ==
He was born 27 May 1929 in Clonaslee, County Laois, one of two sons of Francis Dunne, insurance agent, and Agnes Dunne (née Foley), schoolteacher. Educated at Clonaslee national school and Knockbeg College, County Carlow, he went to work in the etchings library of the Irish Press in 1947, becoming Gaelic games correspondent in 1957.

== Awards ==
He was central to the negotiations with sponsors to set up the annual GAA All Stars Awards which grew out of the Cuchulainn Awards in the 1960s and were established on an annual basis in 1971. He remained its driving force up to the 1990s, and before his death he was honoured with a special award for his work on the scheme.

== Broadcasting ==
In 1970 he joined RTÉ as the station's first Gaelic games correspondent, developing the Gaelic Stadium preview programme and after the arrival of a camera unit in 1976, expanded GAA television coverage.

== Handball and camogie ==
A fan of the lesser Gaelic games of camogie and handball, he helped devise the televised handball series Top Ace in 1973. It was expanded to include Mexican and American players in 1980. On his retirement he was awarded the Waterford Crystal Handball Award for special services to handball. Four communications awards presented annually by the Camogie Association are named in his honour.

== Magazine ==
After his retirement he wrote regular columns for the Irish Independent and Gaelic Sport magazine. He was contributing editor to High Ball magazine following its establishment by Mike Hogan and Eoghan Corry in 1998, having previously edited Gaelic World.

== Books ==
Dunne contributed updates on the GAA's own records for the 1975 Our Games Annual and what was to be eventually published as the Complete handbook of Gaelic games up to 1999. Own-name works include The Star Spangled Final (1997), an account of the staging of the 1947 All-Ireland football final in New York and a history of Gaelic football in the Gardaí, The Story of the Garda GAA Club (1998). In 2010 his archive was handed over to the GAA museum in Croke Park by his daughter Eileen, a newsreader with RTÉ.

== Marriage and death ==
Dunne married Lilly Fox, from Delvin, County Westmeath in 1956. They had three daughters, Eileen, Una, and Moira. He died on 11 August 2002.
