= Killurin, County Offaly =

Village in County Offaly, Ireland

Killurin Cill Iúirín
- Village
- Location in Ireland
- Coordinates: 53°12′56″N 7°33′09″W
- Country: Ireland
- Province: Leinster
- County: County Offaly
- Barony: Geashill

Population (2016)
  - Total: 142

Killurin (Irish: Cill Iúirín) is a village and townland in County Offaly, Ireland. The village is on the R421 road, about 8 kilometres (5 mi) south-west of Tullamore. The population was 142 at the 2016 census.

In 2015, local Gaelic games club Killurin GAA merged with neighbouring Killeigh GAA to form Clodiagh Gaels.

== People ==
- Hugh Mahon (1857–1931), Australian politician, born Killurin.
- William Quarter (1806–1848), first Catholic Bishop of Chicago, born Killurin.
