= Emo, County Laois =

Village in County Laois, Ireland

Emo Irish: Ioma
- Village
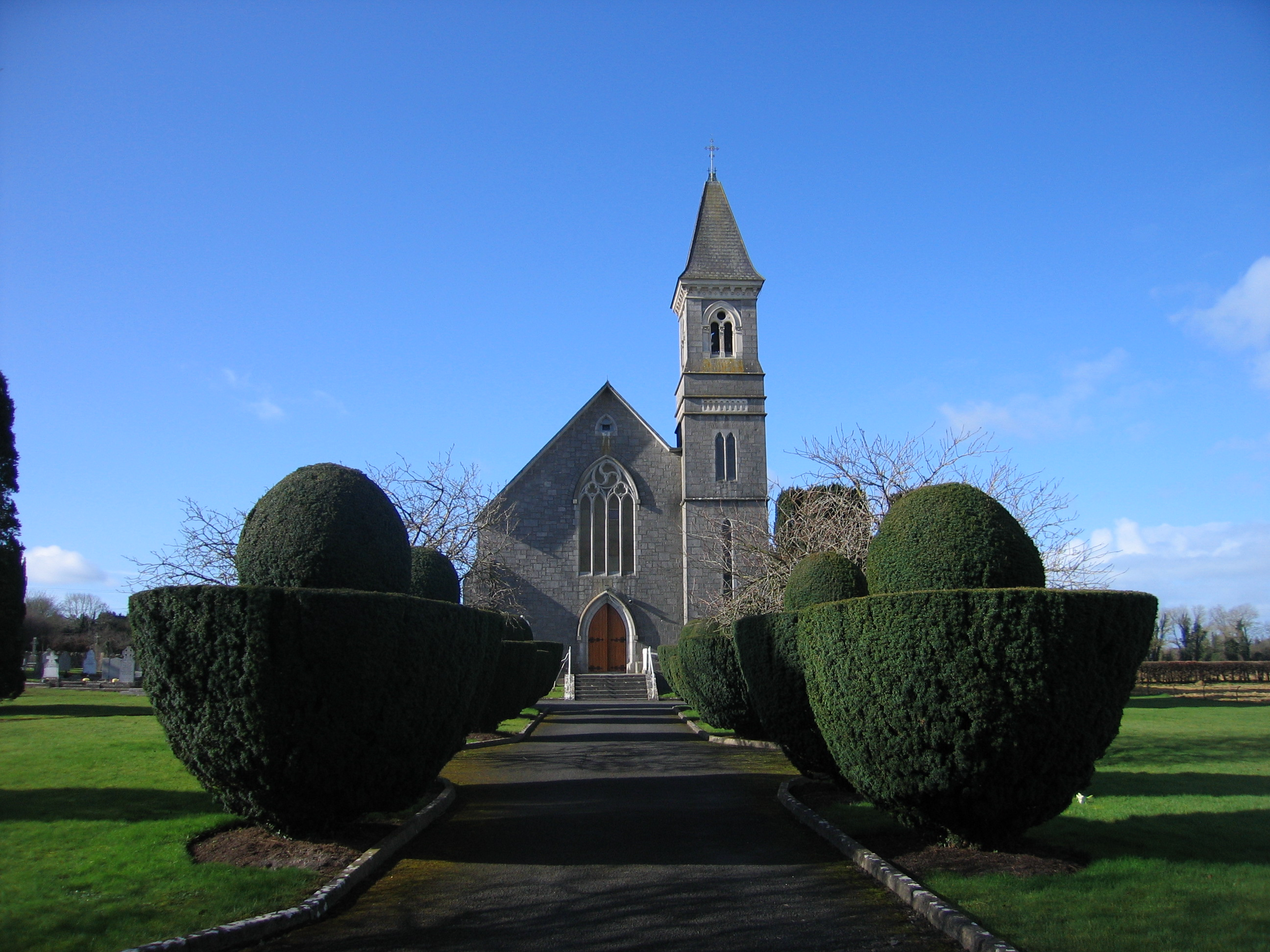
- Emo's Catholic church

- Location in Ireland
- Coordinates: 53°05′48″N 7°12′30″W
- Country: Ireland
- Province: Leinster
- County: Laois

Population (2022)
  - Total: 283
- Time zone: UTC+0 (WET)
  - Summer (DST): UTC-1 (IST (WEST))
- Irish Grid Reference: N530054

Emo (from Irish Ioma, meaning 'bed or resting-place') is a village in County Laois, Ireland. It is located near Portlaoise on the R422 regional road just off the M7 Dublin–Limerick motorway.

== History ==
The late 18th century village of Emo originally developed around the gates of Emo Court. The village pub, the New Inn (now called the "Gate House"), dates from the village's foundation, as does the Gothic Catholic Church, which contains the tomb of Aline, Lady Portarlington, with its recumbent effigy by Joseph Boehm. The site for the church was a gift from Lord Portarlington, and the parochial house and lands beside the church were granted by the Earl of Portarlington at a nominal rent.

Emo Court was designed in 1790 by architect James Gandon for the first Earl of Portarlington and is a well-known example of the neoclassical style.

There is a namesake town in Ontario named after this village by an Irish immigrant from the area.

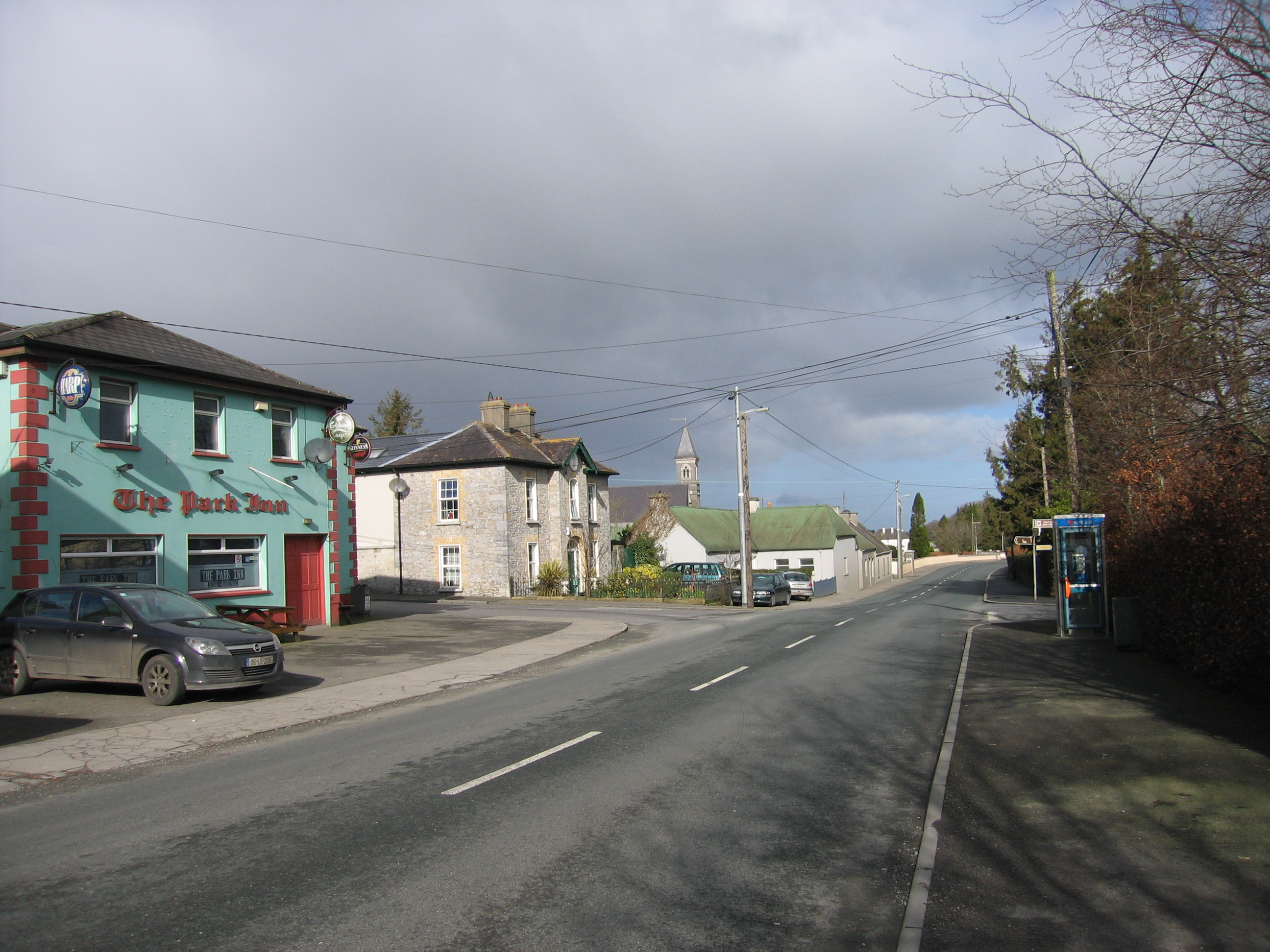
Emo Main Street

== Sport ==
Emo GAA is the local Gaelic Athletic Association club.

== Oil ==
The Emo Oil Company was historically based in Portlaoise and is named after the village. Owned by DCC plc, the company's petrol stations were rebranded as "Certa" starting from September 2022.

== See also ==
- List of towns and villages in Ireland
