= R445 road (Ireland) =

Road in Ireland

R445 road
- Bóthar R445
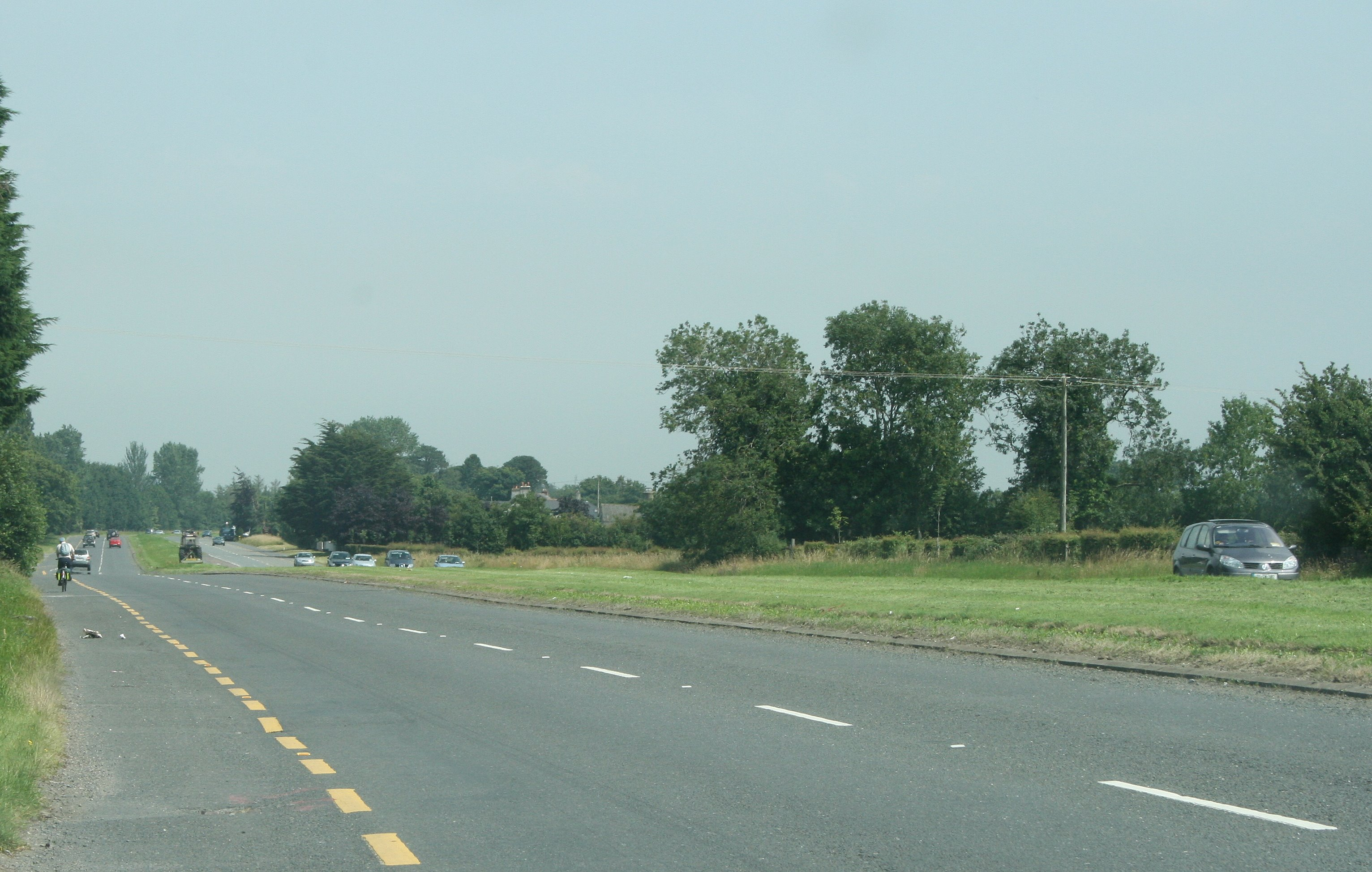
- The R445 dual carriageway between Naas and Newbridge

Route information
- Length: 170 km (110 mi)

Location
- Country: Ireland
- Primary destinations: County Kildare; M7, N7; Naas (R410, R407, R411, R448, R409, crosses Grand Canal); M7; Newbridge (Crosses River Liffey, R416); M7 Junction 12, R413; Kildare town (R415, R413, R401); M7 Junction 13; Crosses railway; M7 Junction 14; Monasterevin (R417, L7055, R414, R424, crosses River Barrow, crosses Grand Canal); County Laois; R420; Ballybrittas; M7 Junction 15, R422; M7 Junction 16, R419; R425; Portlaoise (N80, R426, crosses railway); M7 Junction 17, N77; M7 Junction 18; Mountrath (R423, R430, R440, crosses Mountrath River); Crosses River Nore; Castletown; R434; Borris-in-Ossory (R435); Crosses River Nore; County Offaly; County Tipperary; Crosses Limerick–Ballybrophy railway line; Roscrea (N62, crosses River Barrow, R421, R491); County Offaly; County Tipperary; M7 Junction 23; County Offaly; Dunkerrin; Moneygall (R490); County Tipperary; Crosses Ollatrim River; Toomevara (R499); M7 Junction 24; Crosses Ballintotty River; R491; Crosses Limerick–Ballybrophy railway line; Crosses Nenagh River; Nenagh (R497, R494, R498); N52; M7 Junction 26; R499; R496; Crosses Limerick–Ballybrophy railway line; R494; Birdhill (R466, R504); County Limerick; R525; Crosses Limerick–Ballybrophy railway line; M7 Junction 28, R503, R506; Crosses Mulkear River; Limerick (R509, crosses railway, R858, R857, R463, crosses River Shannon, R464, R857, R527, N69); County Clare; Crosses Crompaun River; Meelick (N18)

Highway system
- Roads in Ireland; Motorways; Primary; Secondary; Regional

The R445 road is a regional road in Ireland. The route is a non-motorway alternative route to the N7/M7 motorway between Naas and Limerick, and at 170 km it is one of the longest regional roads in Ireland (longer than most national roads). Indeed, much of the route comprises roads that were formerly part of the N7 between the cities, prior to motorway and other bypasses. Some of the R445 route also comprises local link roads to new N7/M7 route sections.

== Route ==
The official description of the R445 from the Roads Act 1993 (Classification of Regional Roads) Order 2012 reads:

R445: Naas, County Kildare — Portlaoise, County Laois — Roscrea, Nenagh, County Tipperary — Limerick — Crathloemoyle, County Clare (Part Old National Routes 7 and 18)

Between its junction with N7 at Maudlings in the county of Kildare and its junction with N80 at Stradbally Road in the town of Portlaoise in the county of Laois via Dublin Road, Poplar Square, Main Street and Limerick Road in the town of Naas: Newhall, Buckleys Cross: Liffey Bridge, Main Street and Edward Street in the town of Droichead Nua; and Ballymany Cross; Dublin Street and Claregate Street in the town of Kildare; Cherryville Cross, Mayfield (including link road to M7); Mooreabbey and Dublin Street in the town of Monasterevin; and Clogheen in the county of Kildare: Kilinure, Ballybrittas, Cappakeel, New Inn Cross, Greatheath, Ballydavis; Rathbrennan and Dublin Road in the town of Portlaoise in the county of Laois

and

between its junction with N80 at Abbeyleix Road in the town of Portlaoise and its junction with N62 at Benamore in the county of North Tipperary via Grattan Street in the town of Portlaoise; Clonboyne, Cloncourse; Portlaoise Road, Main Street, Market Square, Bridge Street and Patrick Street at Mountrath; Holy Cross, Moorefield Cross, Rush Hall, Derrin Cross, Borris-in-Ossory and Ballaghmore Lower in the county of Laois: and Cooleeshill in the county of Offaly

and

between its junction with the N62 at Parkmore in the county of North Tipperary and its junction with N52 at Tullahedy via Inane in the county of North Tipperary Ouris and Busherstown in the county of Offaly: Greenhills in the county of North Tipperary: Moneygall in the county of Offaly: Toomevara, Clashnevin, Lisbunny: Dublin Road, Thomas MacDonagh Street, Pearse Street, Kickham Street, Ashe Road and Clare Street in the town of Nenagh: and Springfort Cross in the county of North Tipperary

and

between its junction with N52 at Lissenhall in the county of North Tipperary and its junction with the N18 at Cratloemoyle in the county of Clare via Ballinteenoe, Kilmastulla, Gortybrigane and Birdhill in the county of North Tipperary: Dalys Cross, Mountshannon, Annacotty and Groody Bridge in the county of Limerick: Parkway Roundabout, Dublin Road, Clare Street, Lock Quay, Abbey River Bridge, Northern Relief Road, Castle Street, Thomond Bridge, High Road, Sexton Street North, Northern Ring Road, Ennis Road, Caherdavin Cross and Ennis Road in the city of Limerick: Lansdowne Bridge at the boundary between the city of Limerick and the County of Clare: and Meelick in the county of Clare.

== Dublin to southwest of Newbridge ==
Ancillary roads constructed as part of the N7 Naas Road widening and junction separation scheme are classified as the R445. These offer local access to Johnstown and Kill. They connect to the existing R445 at Maudlin's Interchange (Junction 9 on the N7, start of the M7 motorway).

Here the R445 route follows the Dublin Road into Naas (this route was the N7 prior to the construction of the M7 in 1983). The route continues through Naas along Poplar Street and Main Street, before leaving the town along the Limerick Road. South of Naas, the R445 becomes a dual carriageway for 8 km (5.0 mi) and crosses the M7 motorway at Junction 10, continuing west to Newbridge along the town's Dublin Road, crossing the River Liffey via Liffey Bridge onto Main Street. The route continues along Edward Street, leaving the town as the Kildare Road. The R445 links to the M7 motorway at Junction 12, and crosses the Curragh beside the motorway before veering into Kildare Town. The route sections through Newbridge and Kildare formed the N7 until the extension of the M7 motorway between Junction 10 and Junction 13.

== R445 through Kildare, Monasterevin and Portlaoise ==
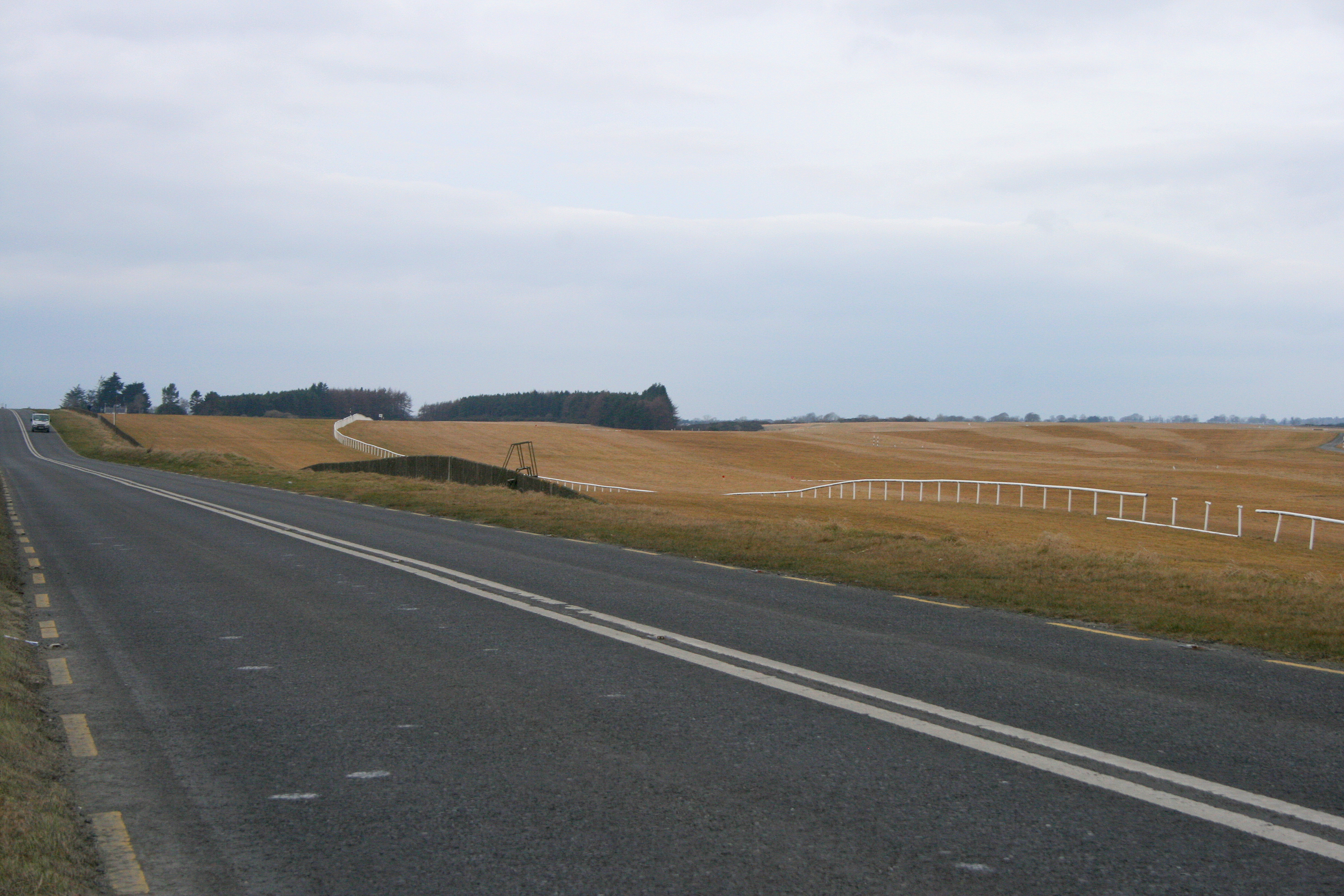
The R445 through The Curragh between Kildare and Newbridge

The R445 continues on the Dublin Road east of Kildare. This runs through the town via Dublin Street, Claregate Street and the Limerick/Cork Road. The R445 meets Junction 14 of the M7 motorway at Mayfield. From here, the route continues west through Monasterevin via Mooreabbey and Dublin Street. The R445 passes through Ballybrittas on the way to Portlaoise, meeting the M7 motorway again at Junction 16. The Dublin Road brings the R445 into Portlaoise where it joins the N80. The R445 begins again where it leaves the N80 at the junction of Grattan Street and Abbeyleix Road, following the former street out of the town, to meet the M7/N7 at Junction 18. The R445 route from east of Kildare to west of Portlaoise consists of redesignated roads which formed part of the N7 route prior to the opening of the M7 Kildare Bypass (2003), Monasterevin Bypass (2004) and Portlaoise Bypass (1997).

== R445 sections between Portlaoise and Limerick ==
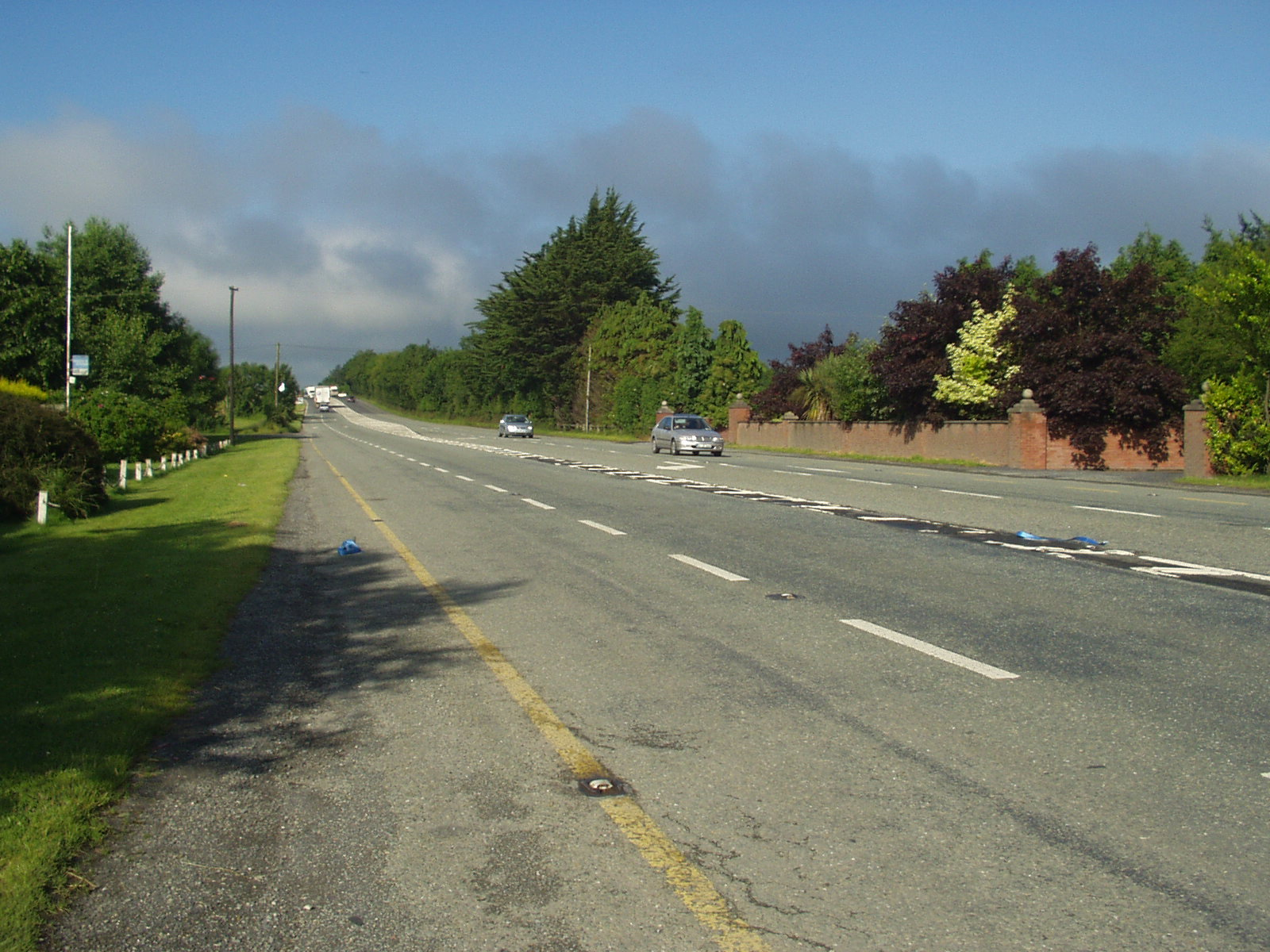
The R445 when it was still the N7 in 2003, just east of Junction 15 looking west

In 2010 all of the old N7 route between Portlaoise and Limerick was replaced with motorway and was reclassified as R445. The first section through Mountrath, Castletown and Borris-in-Ossory was reclassified in May 2010 followed the opening of the M7/M8 tolled motorway.

Following the bypass of Nenagh in 2000, and resulting realignment of the N7, the old route through the town was reclassified as part of the R445. The R445 passes through Nenagh via the Dublin Road, Thomas MacDonagh Street, Pierce Street, Kickham Street, Ash Road and Clare Street. The route meets the N52 west of Nenagh. From the Carrigatogher Roundabout the R445 leaves the N52 road and continues along the old N7 route to Birdhill which was redesignated in April 2010. The route between Birdhill and Annacotty was redesignated as R445 in September 2010 following the opening of the Birdhill to Limerick section of the M7.

On 22 December 2010, following the opening of the M7 Castletown to Nenagh motorway project the old N7 route was reclassified as R445 from Borris-in-Ossory to Nenagh passing through the towns of Roscrea, Moneygall and Toomevara.

== R445 through Limerick ==
Finally, the route through Limerick city, which formed the N7 prior to the opening of the Southern Ring Road in 2004, is also now the R445.

The route passes by Annacotty, and enters Limerick along the Dublin Road through Castletroy. The road crosses the Groody Bridge at the beginning of a new road section also opened in 2004 (also designated the N7 at the time). This brings the Dublin Road and R445 to the Parkway Roundabout, where it meets the Childers Road. The R445 continues as the Dublin Road, Clare Street and Lock Quay before crossing the Abbey Bridge across the Abbey River. The R445 passes through King's Island as the Northern Relief Road and Castle Street (passing by King John's Castle). The route crosses the River Shannon via Thomond Bridge and follows High Street, Sexton Street and the Northern Ring Road (past LIT). At Caherdavin Cross (Ivan's Cross) the route follows the Ennis Road west out of the city to meet the N18 in County Clare at the Coonagh Roundabout.

== See also ==
- Roads in Ireland
- National primary road
- National secondary road
