= N80 road (Ireland) =

Road in Ireland

N80 road
- Bóthar N80
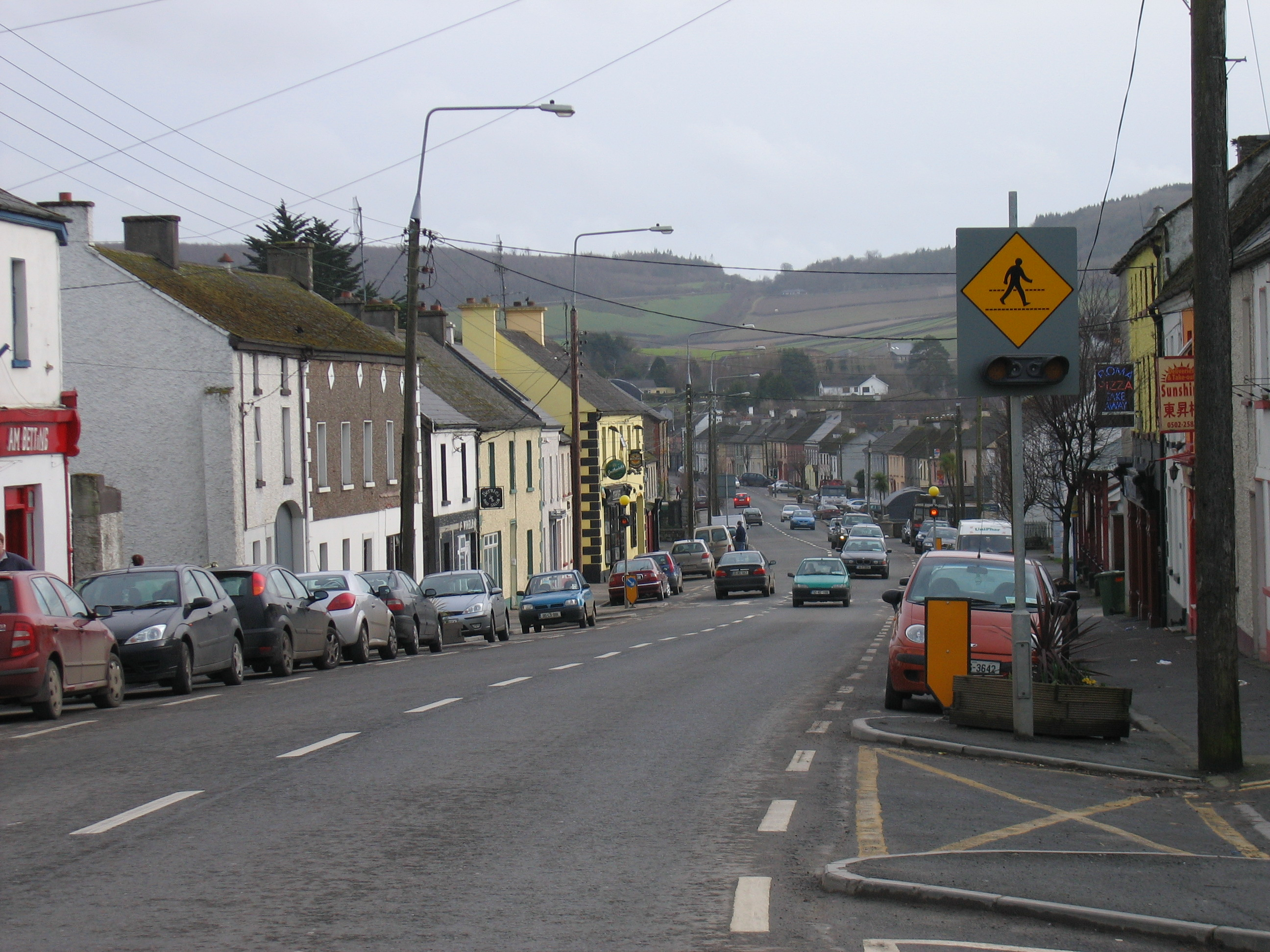
- N80 through Stradbally, County Laois

Route information
- Length: 114.683 km (71.261 mi)

Location
- Country: Ireland
- Primary destinations: County Offaly; Tullamore - starts at a roundabout on the N52; Killeigh; Clonaghadoo; County Laois; Twomile Bridge; Mountmellick R422; is joined by R423; R423 exits; Portlaoise R445, R426, R425; Stradbally R427, R428; N78; Arless; Ballickmoyler R429; County Carlow; Carlow R430, R417, R448, R726, R725; M9; Ballon; N81; Kildavin R724; County Wexford; Bunclody R746; R745; N30; M11

Highway system
- Roads in Ireland; Motorways; Primary; Secondary; Regional

The N80 road is a national secondary road in Ireland that runs southeastwards from its junction with the N52 and R443 in the town of Tullamore in County Offaly, to the N30 at Ballynahallin, just north of Enniscorthy in County Wexford, a distance of 114.683 km. Total length is 114.683 km (71.261 mi).

== Upgrading ==
In common with most National secondary routes, the N80 is a simple two lane road without hard shoulders for much of its route. Some of the worst bends may have been removed through the years and some junctions improved, but general pavement quality is rather poor. No improvements of existing sections are scheduled.

Earlier works of note on the N80 include:

- Bypass of Tullamore (N52) and Moate (M6) involved the designation of some 26 km of N80 to R road resulting in a reduction in its total length.
- Mountmellick inner relief road - project appears to have been abandoned.
- Realigned section where it crosses over the M7 (Completed late 1990s).
- Kildavin bypass (completed in the 1990s it involved passing over the village and bridging over the R724)
- Southern terminus of the N80 at the N11 converted from a simple T-junction to a roundabout (2008).
- N80 Link Road dual carriageway acts as an effective extension from its southern terminus at the N11 to junction 25 of the M11 motorway in Ballydawmore via the N30 road. (Opened 18 July 2019).

== Tullamore bypass ==
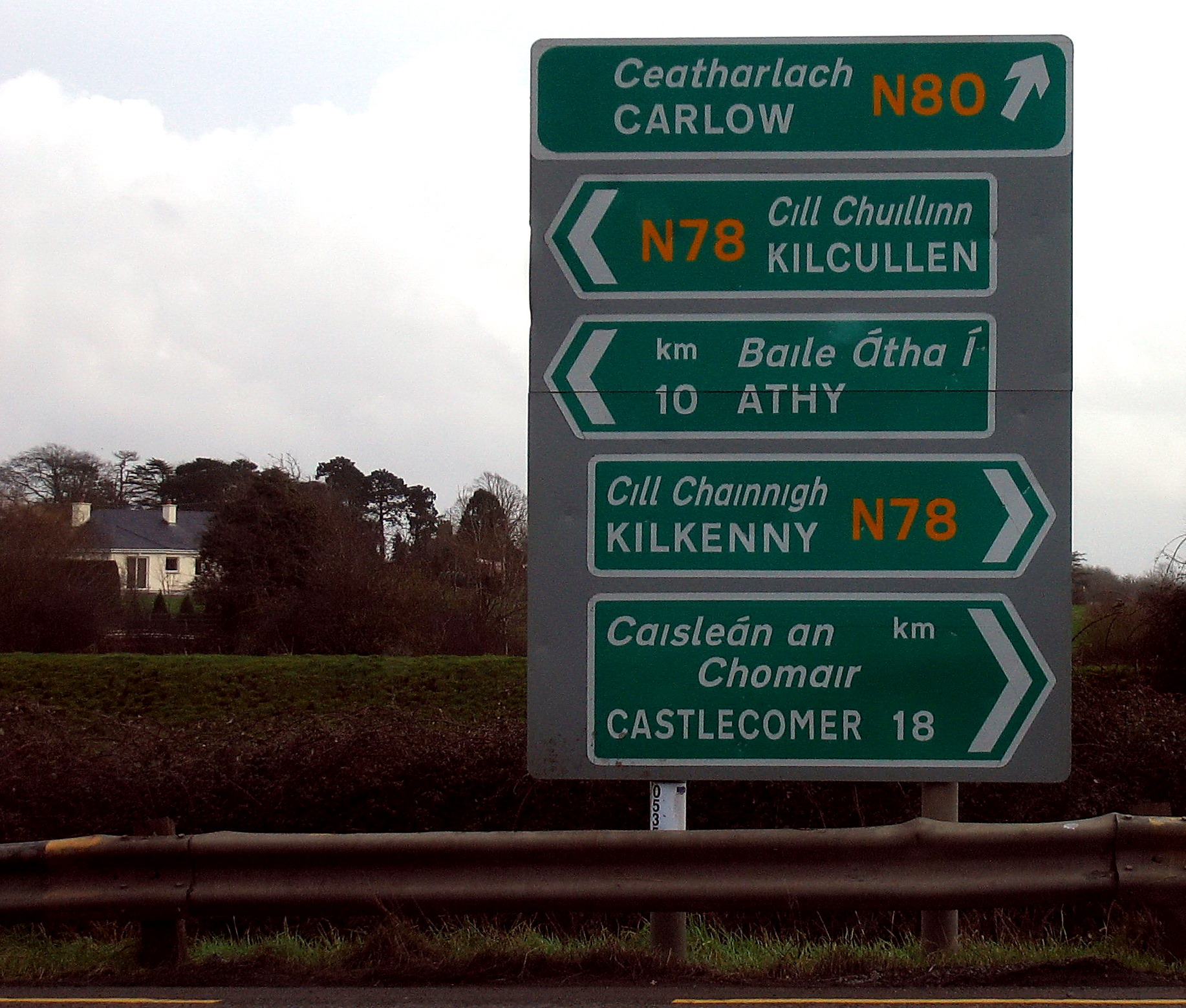
The N80 crosses the N78 at a staggered junction

The Tullamore bypass is a new 14 km (8.7 mi) single carriageway upgrade to the N52. The route leaves the existing N52 approximately 6 km (3.7 mi) southwest of Tullamore town, intersecting with the N80 road SE of the town, crossing over the Grand Canal, before rejoining the N52 again 3 km (1.9 mi) north of the town. A spur designated part of the R443 was constructed from the northern section of the route to the Tullamore Western Relief Road forming a near complete orbital route around Tullamore. The N80 now terminates at the N52 junction on the bypass; traffic heading for Athlone now takes the N52 north to the M6 motorway at Kilbeggan.

== See also ==
- Roads in Ireland
- Motorways in Ireland
- National primary road
- Regional road
