= Mountrath =

Town in County Laois, Ireland

Mountrath Maighean Rátha (Irish)
- Town
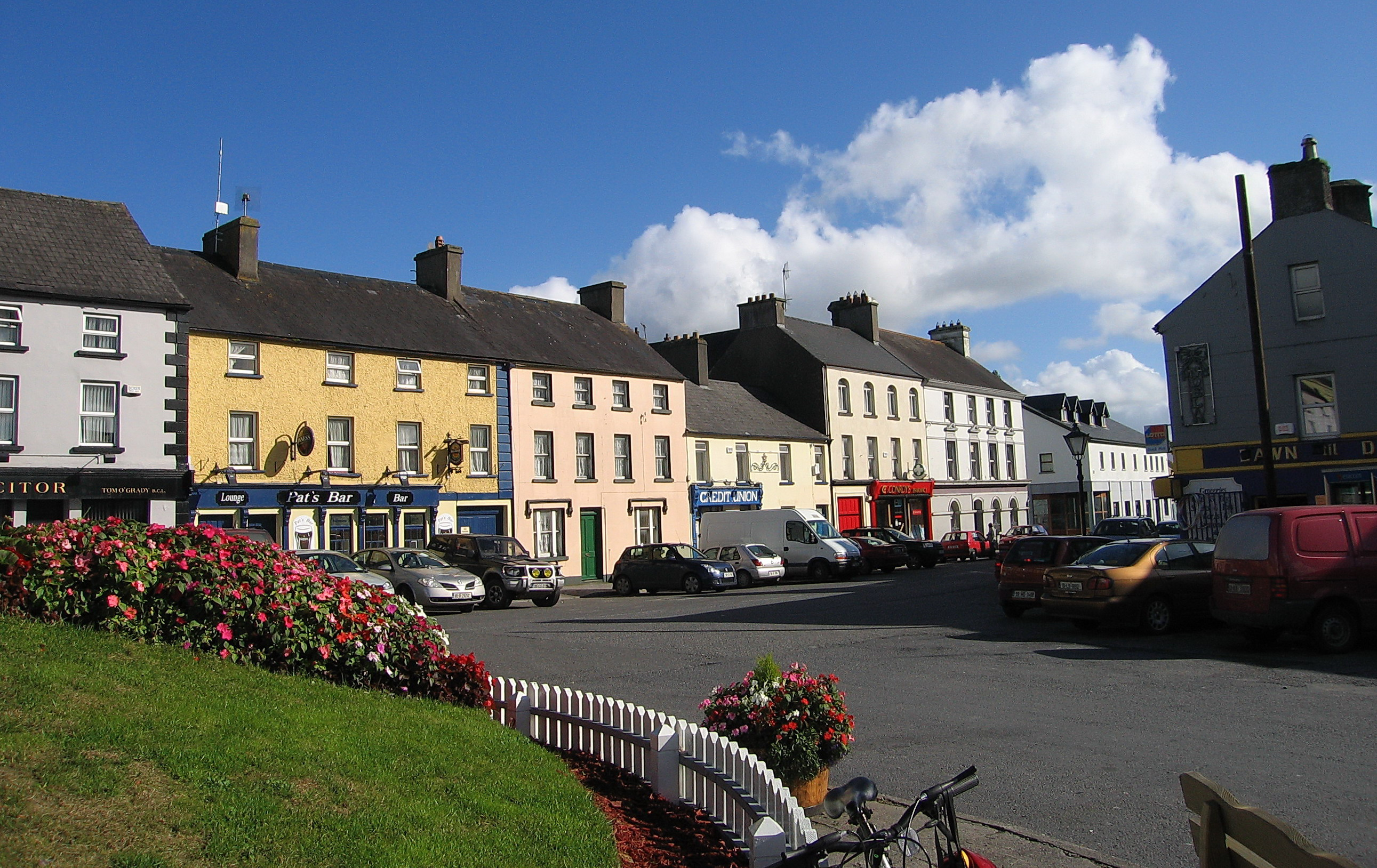
- Mountrath's market square

- Location in Ireland
- Coordinates: 53°00′N 7°28′W
- Country: Ireland
- Province: Leinster
- County: Laois

Population (2022)
  - Total: 2,070
- Time zone: UTC+0 (WET)
  - Summer (DST): UTC-1 (IST (WEST))

Mountrath (Irish: Maighean Rátha, meaning 'homestead of the ringfort') is a town in County Laois, Ireland. The town lies on the R445 midway between Dublin and Limerick, exactly 96.5 km (60 mi) from both cities. The town was bypassed by the M7 motorway in 2010, leading to a significant easing of traffic congestion in the town.

As of the 2022 census, Mountrath had a population of 2,070. The river that flows through the town is called the Whitehorse and gets its name from the white colouring that was present in its water from the whiskey distillery that used to be in the centre of the town.

== History ==
The important Synod of Ráth Breasail was held near Mountrath in 1111.

In the beginning of the 17th century, the lands around Mountrath became the property of Charles Coote. Despite the wild surrounding country, which was covered with woodlands, he laid the foundation of the present town. In 1628, Coote obtained for the inhabitants a grant of two weekly markets and two fairs and established a very extensive linen and fustian manufactory. In the year 1641, as a Royalist supporter, much of his property was destroyed during the Irish Confederacy in the War of the Three Kingdoms.

His son, Sam Coote, regained the castle and estate of Mountrath, along with other properties and following the Restoration, was created Earl of Mountrath. This title was extant until the death of Charles Henry, the 7th Earl, in 1802, when it became extinct. Newpark, adjoining the town, was the residence of the Earl of Mountrath. In 1831, the town contained 429 houses; iron was made and wrought here till the neighbouring woods were consumed for charcoal fuel. The Post Chaise Companion, published in 1805, states that:

"Near Mountrath is an extensive bank containing, or rather, formed of excellent iron ore, within a few metres of the surface; here an iron and metal foundry has been established and wrought some years since with great success; but at present, from the scarcity of charcoal, on the destruction of the neighbouring woods, the furnaces are seldom employed; it is much to be regretted that such a valuable manufacture should be discontinued on the above account, as the country abounds with bogs, and charred turf might probably be substituted in the place of charcoal for most purposes."

In his 1837 Topographical Dictionary of Ireland entry for Mountrath, Samuel Lewis states that:

"an extensive factory for spinning and weaving cotton is carried on by Mr. Greenham, who employs 150 persons in the spinning mills, and about 500 in weaving calicoes at their own houses; the average quantity manufactured is from 200 to 250 pieces weekly. Stuff-weaving is also carried on extensively; there is a large brewery and malting establishment, and an extensive oil mill; and the inhabitants carry on a very extensive country trade."

In the latter portion of the 18th and early 19th century, the Orange Order was strong in the town of Mountrath and surrounding townships. Older leases granted on the Castlecoote estate, on which the town was built, were written in strict accordance with the Penal Laws and contained a clause prohibiting the letting, selling, or bestowal of ground for the purpose of erecting a Roman Catholic Church. In consequence of this prohibition, the place of worship used by local Catholics stood upon a sandbank beside a tributary of the River Nore called 'The Brook".

In 1794, Dr. Delany, Bishop of Kildare and Leighlin, whose mother was a Fitzpatrick of Deerpark, proposed to build a parish church. Lord Castlecoote was publicly opposed to the proposal, but the political climate of toleration that followed the Roman Catholic Relief Act 1793 encouraged the bishop. He made application for a site to Mr. Hawkesworth, agent to Lord Castlecoote. This gentleman found Dr. Delany a suitable plot from his own landholdings and, shortly after, through his influence with the proprietor, procured a perpetual peppercorn lease as a site for a parish church. Building commenced about 1795.

On 18 April 1809, the Convent of St. Brigid, at Mountrath, was founded by three sisters from the mother house at Tullow and brought from Tullow by horse and dray by Bill Delaney and Michael Fitzpatrick. Soon after, the Monastery of St. Patrick was established. Both convent and monastery communities were employed in the education of Roman Catholic pupils. A new church was completed in 1867.

In October 2017, the Brigidine Sisters gifted the convent to the community of Mountrath for the long-term benefit and development of the town and surrounding areas. In 2018, a fitness and martial arts academy opened its doors to the public, offering Karate, Jujitsu, Kickboxing and Fitness classes. In 2018, building work commenced on a new Enterprise Hub and Community Centre within the confines of the convent buildings.{}

== Places of interest ==
Near Mountrath on the R445 towards Portlaoise is a shapeless old Wish Tree in the form of a Sycamore tree called St Fintan's Well. The original well was filled in, but the water reappeared in the centre of the tree. Hundreds of pennies have been beaten into the bark as good luck offerings, until they eventually killed the tree, but it began to sprout new shoots from its trunk and is growing again. Local folklore suggests that the water in the centre of the tree was a cure for warts.

== Education ==
The local secondary schools of St. Aengus and The Brigidine Convent in Mountrath both closed in mid-2009. In September 2009, they amalgamated with nearby Patrician College in Ballyfin to form the Mountrath Community School.

== Notable people ==
- Claire Byrne, journalist and broadcaster.
- John Codd, Waffen SS collaborator.
- Daniel Delany, Bishop of Kildare and Leighlin and the founder of the Brigidine order of Catholic nuns, and the Patrician Brothers.
- Michael Keogh, educated in Mountrath: "the man who saved Hitler"
- Henrietta Moraes, lived in Mountrath in the 1970s and 1980s.
- Óengus of Tallaght, 9th-century saint who may have been born near Mountrath.
- Rou Reynolds, musician and poet, lived in Mountrath while writing and recording The Mindsweep.
- Helen M. Roe, First County Librarian 1926, Antiquarian, President of the Royal Society of Antiquaries of Ireland (RSAI), Member of the Royal Irish Academy (RIA).
- Mary Francis Xavier Warde, nun.

== See also ==
- List of towns and villages in Ireland
