= Mountmellick =

Town in County Laois, Ireland

Mountmellick Móinteach Mílic (Irish)
- Town
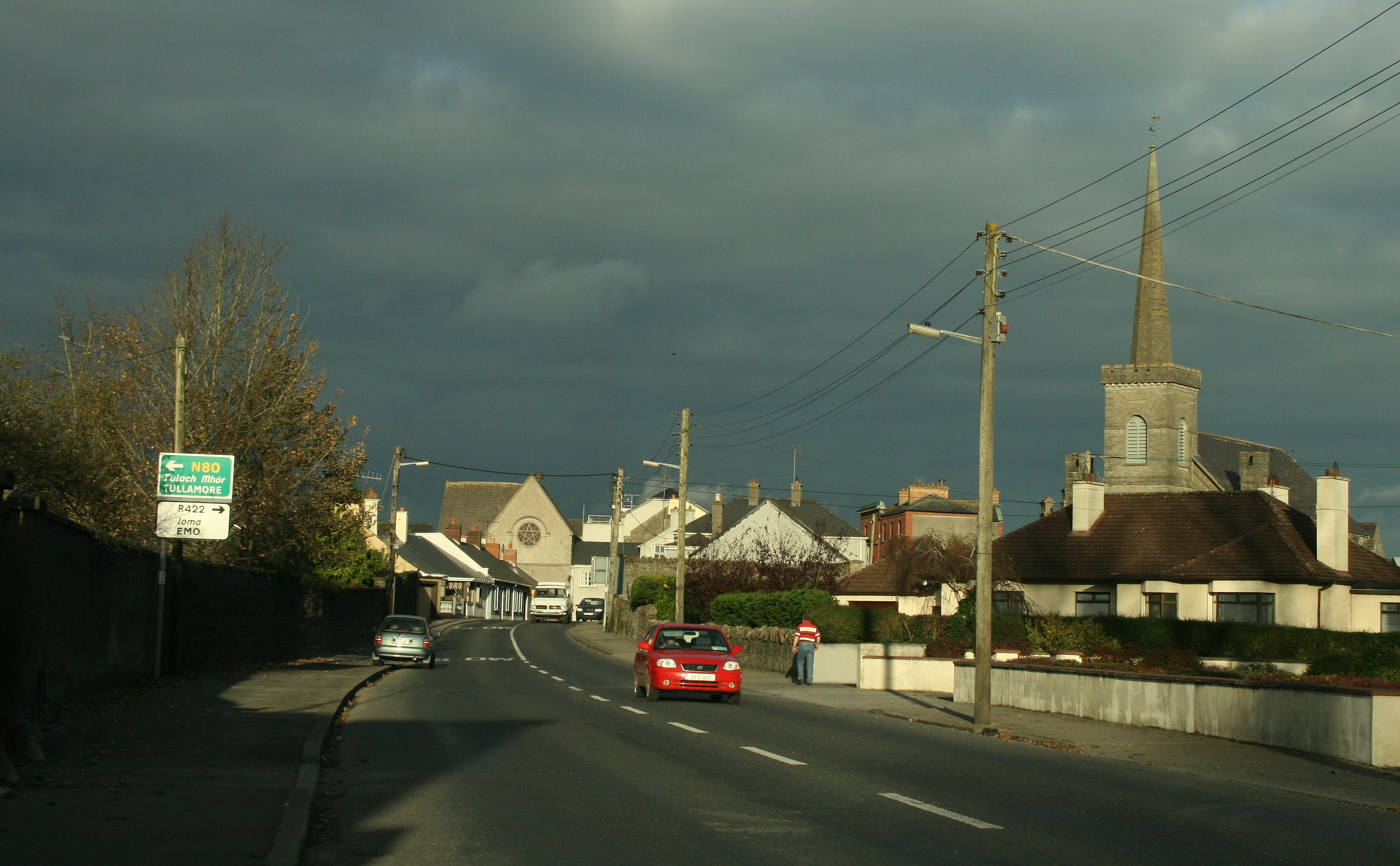
- The southern approach to Mountmellick

- Coat of arms
- Motto: Irish: Cairdeas trí Pháirtíocht "Friendship through Partnership"
- Location in Ireland
- Coordinates: 53°06′59″N 7°19′27″W
- Country: Ireland
- Province: Leinster
- County: County Laois
- Elevation: 75 m (246 ft)

Population (2022)
  - Total: 4,905
- Time zone: UTC±0 (WET)
  - Summer (DST): UTC+1 (IST)
- Eircode routing key: R32
- Telephone area code: +353(0)57
- Irish Grid Reference: N449076

Mountmellick or Mountmellic (Irish: Móinteach Mílic) is a town in the north of County Laois, Ireland. It is on the N80 road, 6 km north of Portlaoise. The town is within Mountmellick Roman Catholic parish.

== Name ==
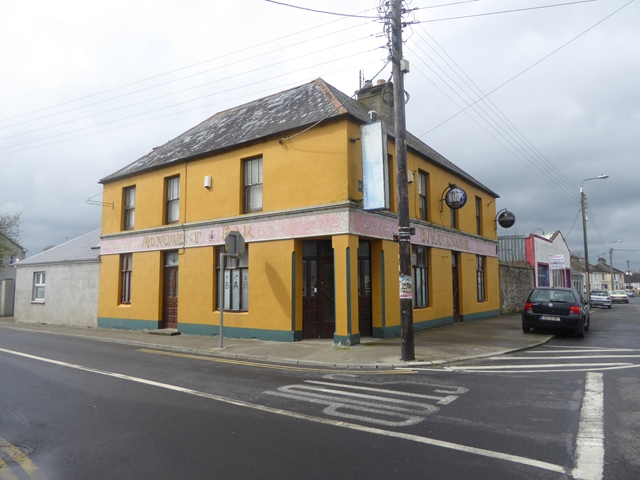
The Monument Bar, Mountmellick

Mountmellick, sometimes spelt Montmellick or Montmellic, is an anglicisation of the Irish name Móinteach Mílic, which means "(the) bog of/by (the) land bordering a river". Older anglicisations include Mointaghmeelick, Montaghmelick, Montiaghmeelick and Monteaghmilick.

== History ==
Historical population
Year	Pop.	±%
1821	2,388	—
1831	4,577	+91.7%
1841	4,755	+3.9%
1851	3,657	−23.1%
1861	3,062	−16.3%
1871	3,316	+8.3%
1881	3,126	−5.7%
1891	2,623	−16.1%
1901	2,407	−8.2%
1911	2,341	−2.7%
1926	2,279	−2.6%
1936	2,314	+1.5%
1946	2,737	+18.3%
1951	2,501	−8.6%
1956	2,677	+7.0%
1961	2,594	−3.1%
1966	2,580	−0.5%
1971	2,864	+11.0%
1981	3,349	+16.9%
1986	3,230	−3.6%
1991	3,002	−7.1%
1996	2,912	−3.0%
2002	3,361	+15.4%
2006	4,069	+21.1%
2011	4,735	+16.4%
2016	4,777	+0.9%
2022	4,905	+2.7%

Mountmellick was a 15th-century settlement on the narrow Owenass River ('River of the Falls' in Irish) with an encampment on its banks at Irishtown. Overlooking this valley with its trees and wildlife was a small church called Kilmongan (Ivy Chapel), which was closed by the Penal Laws in 1640.

English Quakers settled in the area from about 1657, led by William Edmundson. They saw a future for this settlement and built it into a town, which was to grow to 8,000 people, with 27 industries which included breweries, a distillery, woollen mills, cotton, tanneries and glass. It was a boomtown in the late 19th century. One of its earliest Quaker settlers (circa 1680) was Richard Jackson, who, with his brother Anthony, had been converted to Quakerism in Eccleston, by the missionaries George Fox and Edmundson. Jackson's older brother Anthony settled at Oldcastle in County Meath at about the same time that Jackson and his wife, Margaret Keete, came to Mountmellick. Nicholas Jackson, who may have been a son of Richard Jackson, and had been born in Lancashire, married an Anne Mann in Mountmellick in about 1702. Descendants of Nicholas and Anne Jackson emigrated to New Garden Township, Pennsylvania in the 1710s. Isaac Jackson, Nicholas's uncle, also settled near New Garden Township in 1725, in an area the family later called Harmony Grove. There is still a Quaker population in the town, and a Friends meeting house. The town has numerous examples of Georgian architecture and one of the finest examples of a Georgian square in Ireland.

=== The Manchester of Ireland ===
Such was the level of industrial activity in the area in the late 18th century that Mountmellick became known as "The Manchester of Ireland". Its role as a textile producer during the industrial revolution of the mid-1700s brought favourable comparisons to Manchester, the industrial centre of England at the time.

Deciduous woodlands, which once covered Laois, provided a source of bark for a tanning industry, which converted animal hides into leather. William Edmundson (1627–1712), the first Quaker to settle in Mountmellick, owned a tannery, and the Goodbodys and Pim families also owned tanneries in the 19th century. Towards the end of the 18th century, the textile industry grew significantly. A number of large mills were opened in the 1780s. These produced the necessary raw materials to develop weaving as an important cottage industry, providing farming households with a secondary source of income. By 1837, it was estimated that 4,000 people were employed in the cotton and woollen industry in the Mountmellick area.

The three main centres of this industry were established at New Mills in Drinagh, Barkmills, near Ballyfin and Anngrove in Irishtown. Initially, these mills were powered by water, but steam engines were gradually introduced during the 19th Century.

In 1801, there were five breweries in Mountmellick, and these supplied beer to towns within a 25-mile radius. These breweries declined as larger breweries elsewhere developed their distribution on the railways and canals. As the temperance movement grew in the second half of the 19th century, there was a shift from brewing to malting. Two malting enterprises in Irishtown were developed by the Codd family in the early 20th century and malt production still takes place in Mountmellick today.

The first bank in the town was opened in 1824, and the first modern sugar factory in Ireland was opened in Mountmellick in 1852. It was situated behind the present MDA building in Irishtown. Despite its aspirations, economic factors led to its closure in 1862.

=== Mountmellick lace ===
According to tradition, in 1825, a Quaker named Joanna Carter introduced what later became known as Mountmellick embroidery. The first known sale of this type of lacework was to the Earl of Dunraven (Lord Adare) of Limerick in 1847.

Although Carter is credited with its introduction, little is known about her. She ran a small school in a thatched house and taught at least 15 girls. Her annual income was £9 per year. Although the precise location of her home is not known, the 'Primary Valuation of Tenements' indicates that a John Carter lived in a house in Pond Street, Mountmellick in 1850. In the report on the Irish Industrial Exhibition of 1853, Joanna Carter was referred to as, 'Carter, J Mountmellick, Queen's County, Designer and Manufacturer, embroidered quilt, toilet cover and doileys'. The report also stated that she was responsible for the design and execution of a richly embroidered quilt exhibited by the Countess of Eglinton. Another woman associated with the early development of Mountmellick embroidery was Margaret Beale (1809–1877). Originally from Enniscorthy, County Wexford, she was married to Joseph Beale, a prominent manufacturer in the town.

Mountmellick was a significant industrial town before the Great Famine of the mid-19th century, when it was known as 'The Manchester of Ireland' or 'little Manchester'. This was partly thanks to the Grand Canal, the Mountmellick branch of which is now filled in. Mountmellick embroidery, also known as Mountmellick Lace, became one of the most popular forms of needlework during the 19th century, and early examples fetch high prices on the international market. The local museum displays original pieces of this craftwork.

The history of needlework in Mountmellick before the 19th century is unclear. However, when the Society of Friends opened its school in Mountmellick in 1786, the girls were instructed in needlework to earn money for their textbooks. There appear to have been strong links between Mountmellick embroidery and the Quaker Leinster Provincial School in the town. They fostered the tradition of embroidery by both teaching it and adapting their own designs. A government school report of 1858 recorded that plain and fancy needlework was being taught at the school. The same report also noted that plain and fancy needlework was taught to girls at the Church of Ireland School Mountmellick. The Presentation order was heavily involved in the promotion of the craft. In 1920, when the Quaker school closed, the Presentation Sisters moved into the school and continued its embroidery tradition.

In about 1880, a Mrs Milner started an industrial association in Mountmellick to provide a livelihood 'for distressed Irish gentlewomen'. By 1890, it is known to have had 50 women employed in producing the embroidery. This seems to have led to an upsurge in interest in it. It was taken up by women throughout the country; as a consequence, it ceased to be just a local craft. A Mrs Florance Patterson, an architect from Craigivad, County Down, was an expert in needlework, including Mountmellick embroidery. At this time, it seems that Mountmellick embroidery was gaining international recognition. For example, in 1885, Alexandra, Princess of Wales, visited Ireland and the industrial association presented her with a dressing-table cover in Mountmellick embroidery. Between 1890 and 1898, Weldon, a London publisher, produced four volumes called 'Weldon's Practical Mountmellick embroidery'. Altogether, Weldon published eight volumes on the subject and helped to make the embroidery more popular. Barour's Prize Needle-Work series, published in the 1890s Boston, USA, included a section on Mountmellick embroidery. One consequence of its increased popularity was that the emphasis changed from its being a source of income for the poor to being a middle-class social pastime.

The production of Mountmellick embroidery and other forms of needlework began to decline during the 19th century. By 1907, the number of people employed in the production of the embroidery had fallen from 50 to eight. Despite this, it maintained an international reputation for quality, style and durability. In 1963, US President John F. Kennedy was presented with a white Mountmellick embroidery quilt by the National Council for the Blind of Ireland.

The tradition of Mountmellick embroidery is maintained through weekly classes, which are held in the Mountmellick Development Association building.

== Coat of arms ==
Mountmellick's coat of arms

The chief herald of Ireland assigned a coat of arms to the Mountmellick Town Commission on 16 December 1998.

The motto, displayed on the town's coat of arms, translates as "friendship through partnership". The fretted design represents Mountmellick Work, an embroidery craft unique to the town. The diagonally-running wave represents the Owenass River, which embraces much of the town. The crosses reflect the foundation of the town by the Society of Friends or Quakers. These heraldic elements are 'crosses moline', and derive from the mill-rind, the iron centre of a millstone. They reflect a former Mountmellick industry. The sprigs of Andromeda polifolia, or bog rosemary, are representative of the name place, Mointech Milic. Mointeach means "mooreland," reclaimed bogland, and Milic means wetland.

== Education ==
Mountmellick has four primary schools: St Joseph's Girls' National School and St Patrick's Boys' National School, built in 1973, which share a building; St Paul's National School on the Portlaoise Road, and The Rock National School, St Patrick's Boys School one mile out on the Dublin road. There is also a community school in the town square, serving secondary-age pupils. Until its closure in the early 21st century, the nearby Patrician College secondary school in Ballyfin had a portion of its pupils travel from Mountmellick by bus each day.

== Economic activity ==
The town's main industries are agriculture, light manufacturing and brewing. It serves as a dormitory town for nearby Portlaoise and for Dublin, with easy access to the M7 motorway and the Dublin-Cork railway line. This has led to the population of Mountmellick expanding rapidly in the years between 2004 and 2012 and also to an increase in new houses and several new housing estates during the Celtic Tiger era and beyond until the Irish financial crisis.

== Sport ==
Mountmellick GAA is the town's club for Gaelic football and hurling, while other nearby Gaelic games clubs are The Rock GAA and Kilcavan.

Sarsfields Ladies football club is the town's club for Ladies gaelic football.

Mountmellick Athletic Club, an athletics club based in the town, was accepting new members as of January 2020, but was reportedly "not active" by mid-2021.

== Transport ==
=== Road ===
Mountmellick is on the N80 national secondary road, and also the R422 and R423 regional roads.

=== Bus ===
Mountmellick is served by Bus Éireann as part of its route between Athlone and Waterford, with three daily services in each direction. It is also on the local Townlink route, with daily connections to Portlaoise and Tullamore.

=== Rail ===
Mountmellick railway station opened on 2 March 1885, at the end of a short branch from Portlaoise. It was originally planned that the line would be extended to Geashill, but this never happened, leaving it as a dead end. It closed to passengers on 27 January 1947, but the branch remained open for sugar beet and special trains until 1 January 1963. The station building is now a private residence.

=== Canal ===
The Mountmellick branch of the Grand Canal became operational in March 1831 and closed in 1960.

== Notable people ==
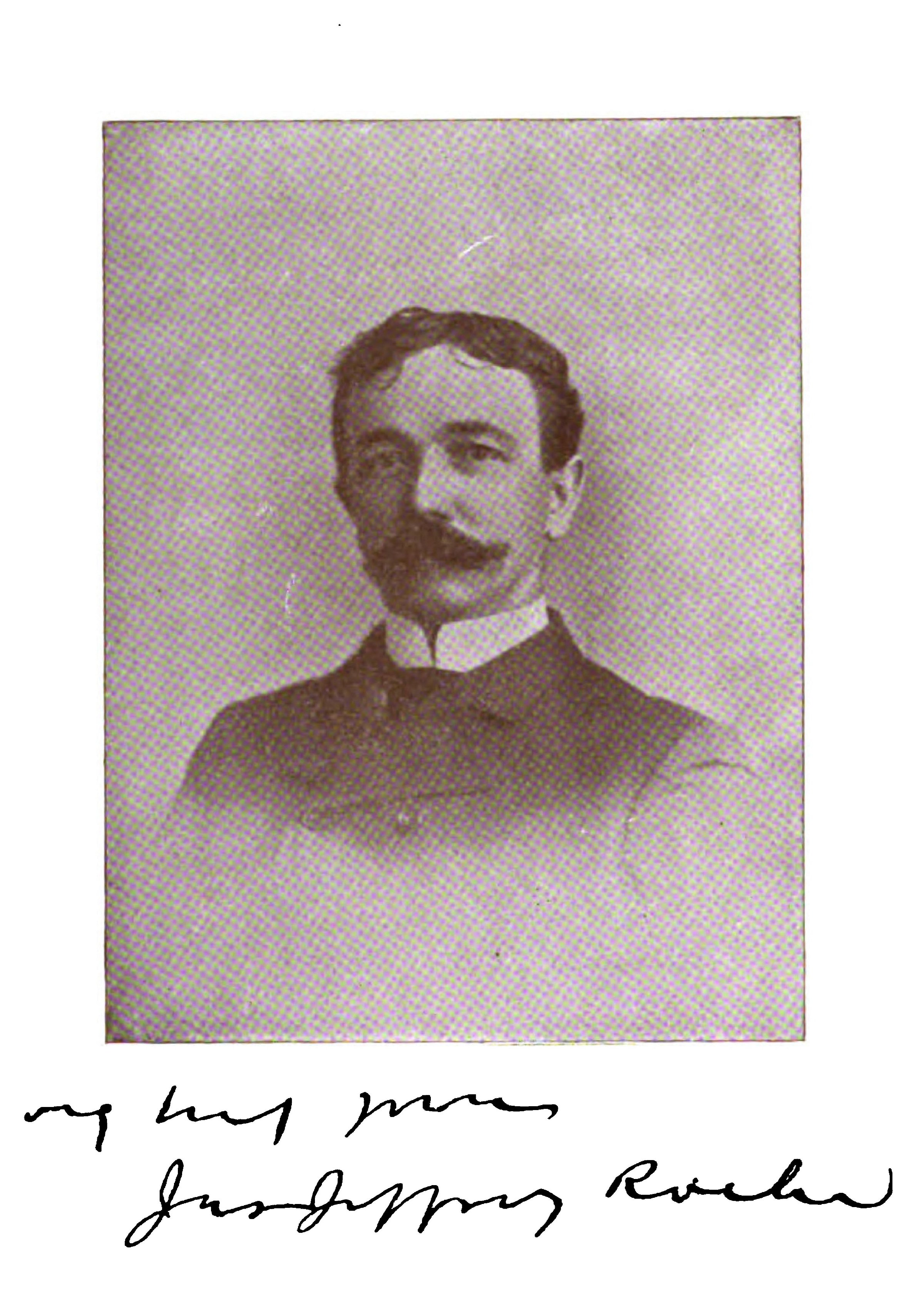
James Jeffrey Roche

- Octavius Beale – Australian piano manufacturer and philanthropist, born in Mountmellick in 1850.
- Oliver J. Flanagan, and his son Charles Flanagan, politicians.
- Anne Jellicoe – Founder of Alexandra College, born in Mountmellick in 1823.
- Michael Mills – Political Editor of The Irish Press and Ombudsman of Ireland, grew up in Mountmellick.
- James Jeffrey Roche – 19th century Irish-American poet and diplomat, born in Mountmellick.
- James Sheane – Architect and designer of St. Cronan's Church, Roscrea (Church of Ireland), lived in the Manor House, Mountmellick.

== See also ==
- List of towns and villages in Ireland

== Notes ==
1.The house that Isaac Jackson's grandson built in Pennsylvania still stands there, and is a Pennsylvania Historical site, as it was used as a way-station on the Underground Railroad during the civil war by Jackson descendants. Isaac sired a long line of Quaker families down to William Miller Jones (b. Philadelphia, 1852) who converted to Catholicism and hyphenated his middle and last names as Miller-Jones. To this day his heirs continue to use the Miller-Jones surname.
