= Roscrea Church =

Roscrea Church may refer to:

- St. Cronan's Church, Roscrea (Church of Ireland), a 19th-century Church of Ireland church in Tipperary, Ireland, and 12th century church of the same name
- St. Cronan's Church, Roscrea (Roman Catholic), a 19th-century Roman Catholic church in Tipperary, Ireland
