= Roscrea Friary =

Ruined Franciscan friary in Tipperary, Ireland

- Mainistir Ros Cré
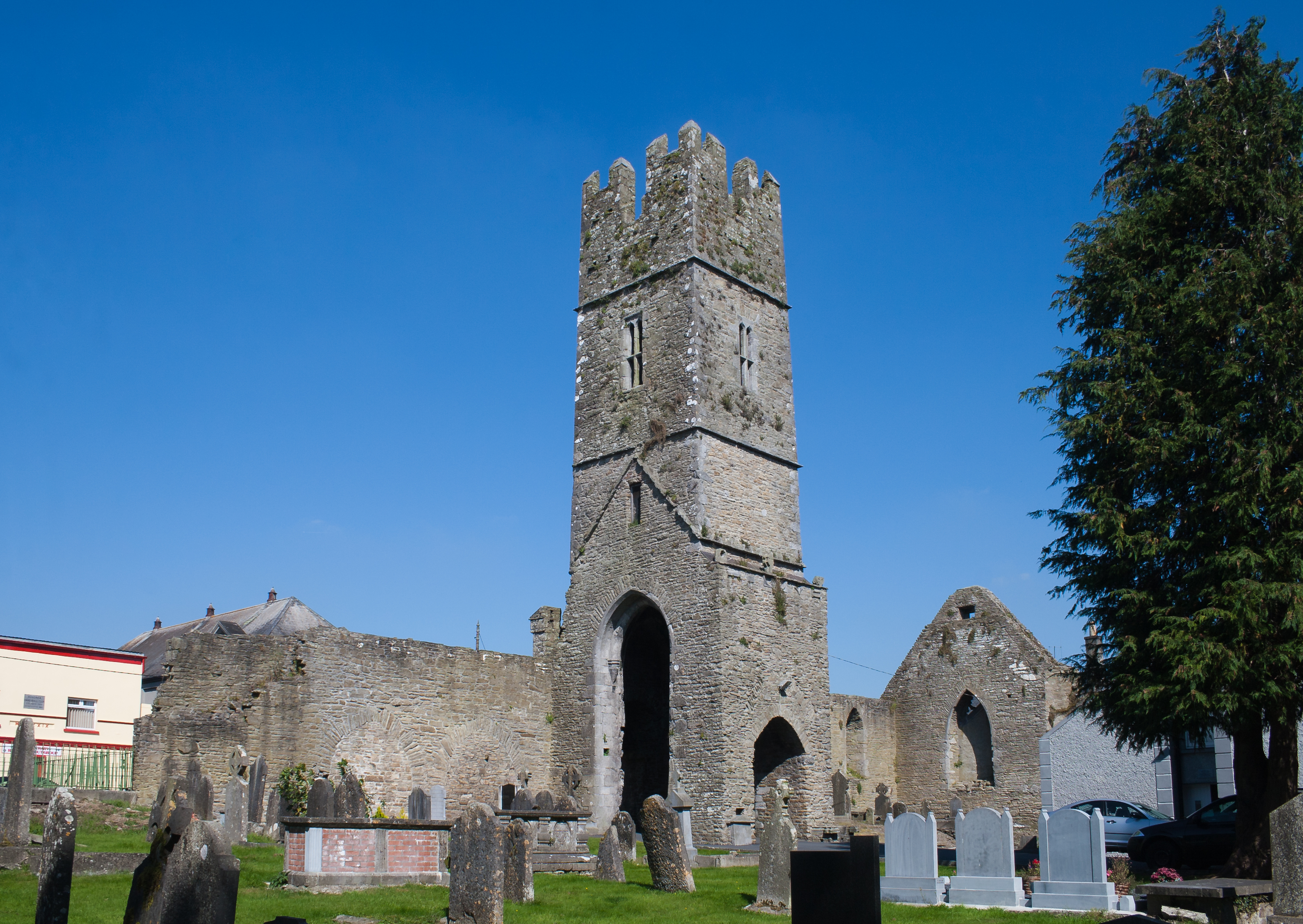
- The abbey church

- Location within Ireland
- Interactive map of Roscrea Friary

Monastery information
- Order: Order of Friars Minor Conventual (before 1477); Order of Friars Minor (1490 on)
- Established: before 1477
- Disestablished: c. 1579
- Diocese: Killaloe

People
- Founder: Maelruanaid O Cerbaill

Architecture
- Status: Inactive
- Style: Late Gothic

Site
- Location: Abbey Street, Roscrea, County Tipperary
- Coordinates: 52.952518°N 7.799660°W
- Public access: yes

Roscrea Friary (Irish: Mainistir na bProinsiasach) is a ruined medieval Franciscan friary and National Monument in Roscrea, County Tipperary, Ireland. It is on Abbey Street, in the west end of Roscrea, on the north bank of the River Bunnow. The Friary was founded in the 15th century by Greyfriars (Franciscans) and later destroyed by British soldiers. What remains are the north and east walls and the bell tower.

== History ==
Tradition ascribes the first foundation of a monastery here to Crónán of Roscrea (died 640).

Roscrea Friary was founded before 1477 by the Order of Friars Minor Conventual (Greyfriars) by Maolruanaidh Ó Cerbaill (Mulrooney O'Carroll, King of Éile; 1390–c.1480) and his wife Bibiana (née Dempsey).

It was reformed c. 1490 for the Order of Friars Minor. The present buildings date to that period.

The friary was dissolved c. 1577–79 and destroyed by English soldiers. Fr Thady O'Daly escaped capture but was later hanged in Limerick.

The friary's land was granted to Connor O'Brien, 3rd Earl of Thomond, c. 1568, who assigned it to William Crow. ed

Some of the friary stone may have been used to build the Catholic church in the 18th century.

== Buildings ==
The remaining are the north and east walls and the central bell tower.

The bell tower is two storeys high and is crenellated. The tower is carried on pointed arches, with a chamfered soffit order and on moulded corbels.

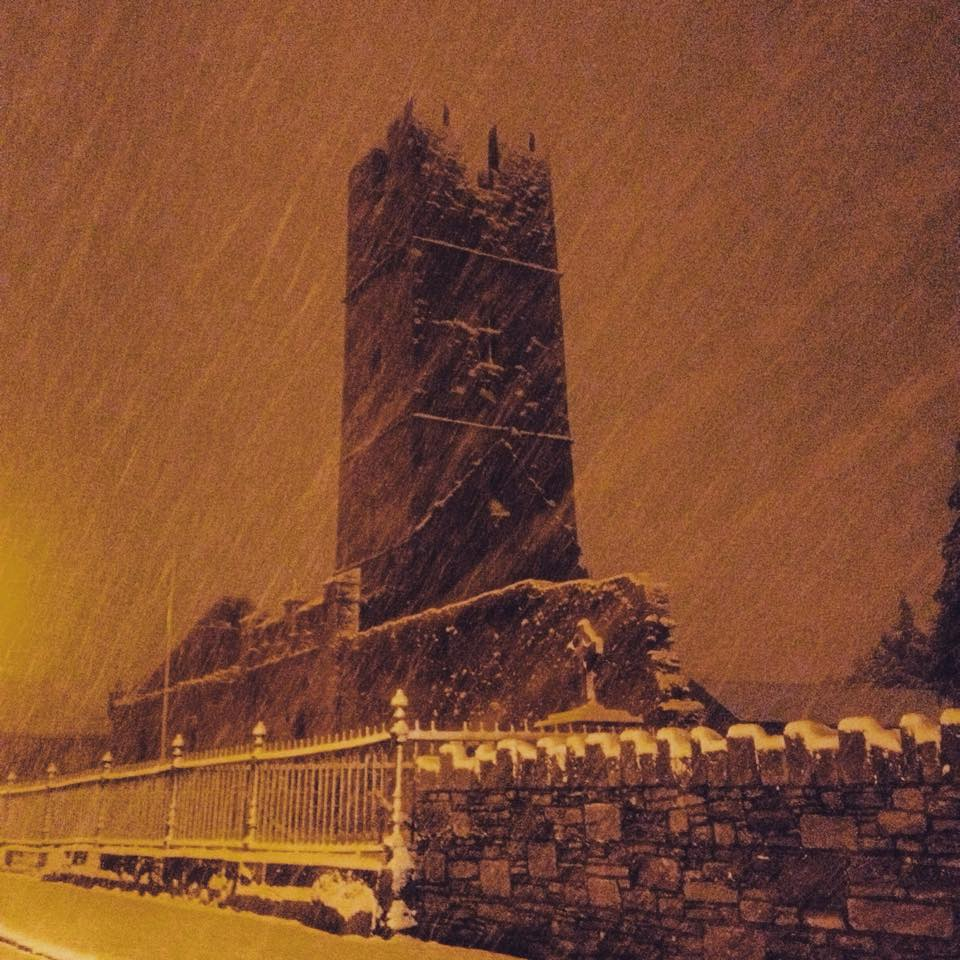
The abbey in the snow

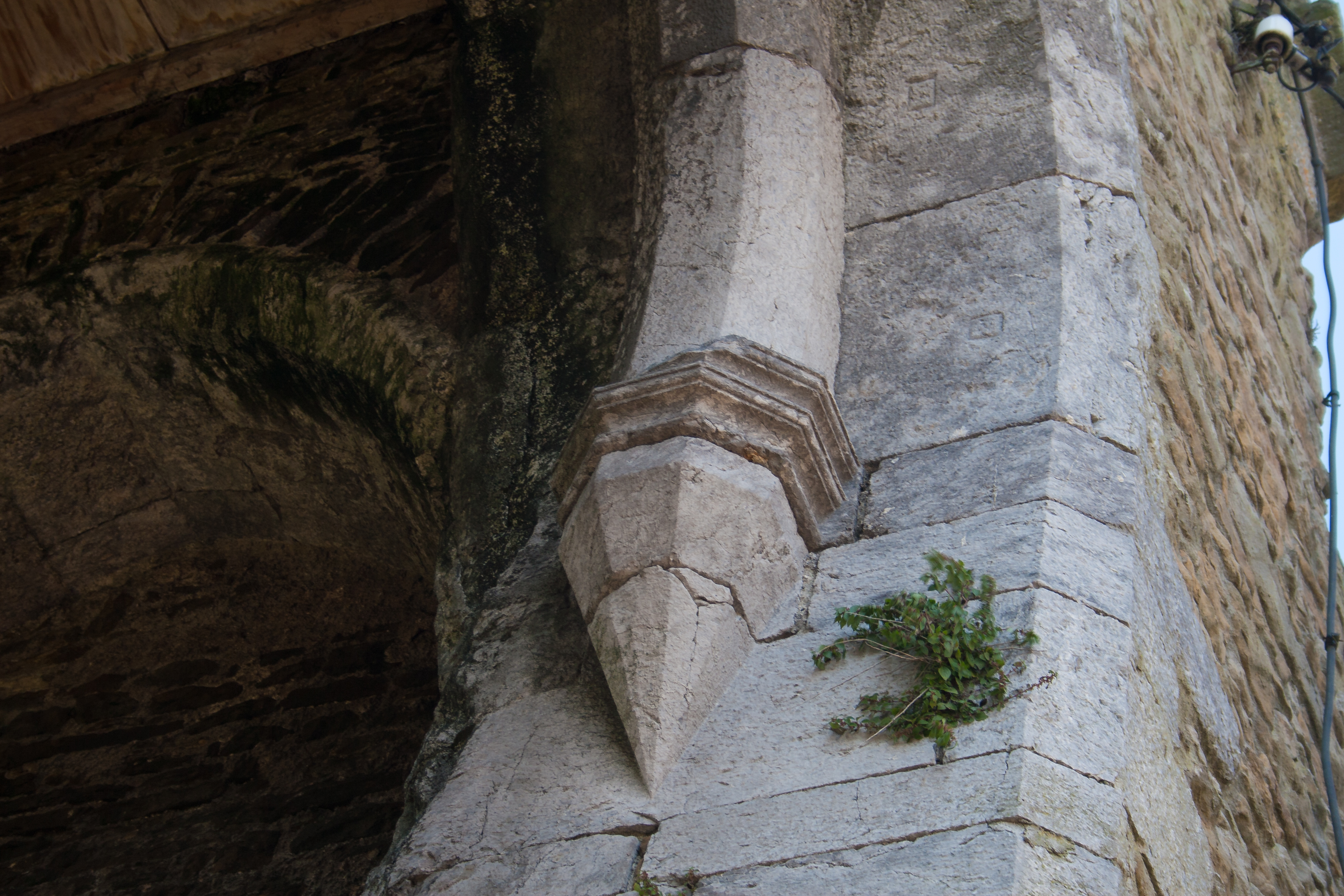
Northeast corbel. Square masons' marks are visible on the stones.

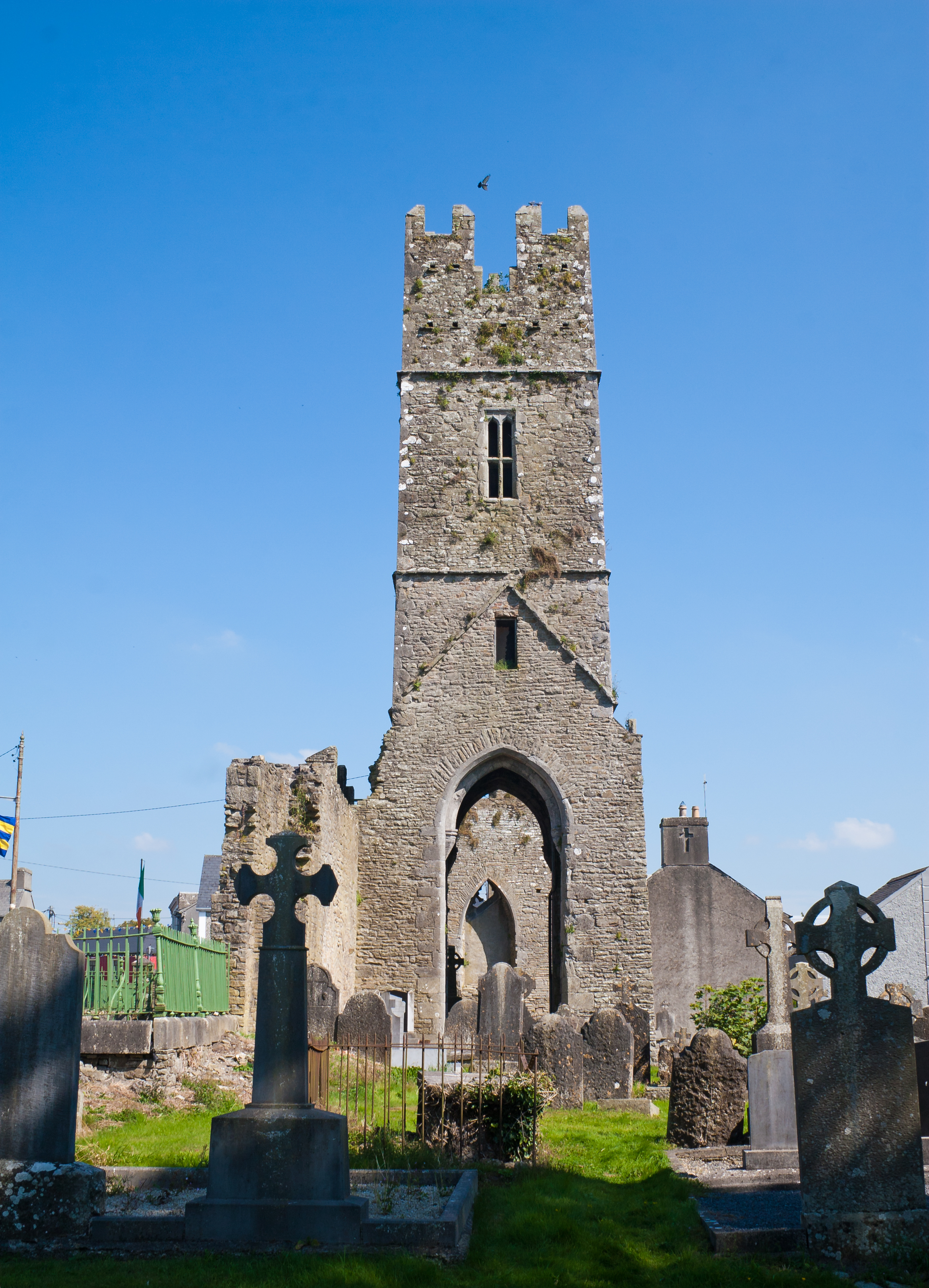
The bell tower
