= Roscrea =

Town in County Tipperary, Ireland

Roscrea Ros Cré
- Town
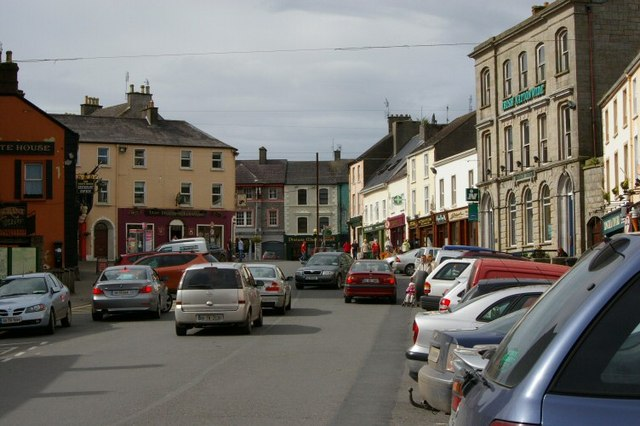
- Castle Street

- Location in Ireland
- Coordinates: 52.955°N 7.797°W
- Country: Ireland
- Province: Munster
- County: Tipperary
- Elevation: 126 m (413 ft)

Population (2022)
  - Total: 5,542
- Time zone: UTC±0 (WET)
  - Summer (DST): UTC+1 (IST)
- Eircode: E53
- Telephone area code: 0505
- Irish Grid Reference: S132894

Roscrea (Irish: Ros Cré, meaning 'Crea's wood') is a market town in County Tipperary, Ireland. In 2022 it had a population of 5,542. Roscrea is one of the oldest towns in Ireland, having developed around the 7th century monastery of Saint Crónán of Roscrea, parts of which remain preserved today. The town is in a civil parish of the same name.

Roscrea is a designated Irish Heritage Town due to the extent of important historical buildings that are preserved in the town. Amongst the most notable buildings of interest are the 13th century Roscrea Castle and Damer House on Castle Street. Within the town are the remains of the ancient Romanesque doorway and gable-end of St Cronan's church. The Round Tower and the 12th century High cross of the ancient monastery are also located nearby. Also of interest in the town are the remains of the 15th century Franciscan Friary and Monaincha and Sean Ross Abbeys. One of the most famous books produced by the monastery is the 8th-century Book of Dimma currently on display at Trinity College, Dublin.

== Location and access ==
Roscrea is in North Tipperary, bordering with County Offaly. It is located in Ireland's Mid-West Region, in a valley between Devil's Bit mountain to the south west and the Slieve Bloom Mountains to the north east. The town is 71 km (44 mi) from Limerick and 122 km (76 mi) from Dublin. It is at the crossroads of the R445 and N62 roads. The Slieve Bloom Mountains reach as far as Roscrea.

Historically, Roscrea was noted as being on one of the ancient highways of Ireland known as the Slighe Dala (meaning 'parliament way') which stretched from Tara in the east to Limerick and the port of Tarbert. It is possible the route formed much of the old N7 road, now the R445 road, which originally passed through the town.

== Transport ==
Roscrea is well connected by bus routes. Bus Éireann route 12 links Dublin and Limerick with connections available hourly. A private bus contractor, JJ Kavanagh and Sons, provides extra bus services to Dublin and Limerick.

Local Link Tipperary operates bus service 854 between Roscrea railway station and Nenagh with intermediate stops in Shinrone, Cloughjordan, Moneygall and Toomevara. The service operates three times a day in each direction seven days a week.

Roscrea railway station is on the Limerick–Ballybrophy railway line between Ballybrophy and Cloughjordan. At Ballybrophy it joins the main Cork-Dublin line. At one time there was a branch from Roscrea to nearby Birr in County Offaly. Roscrea railway station opened on 19 October 1857.

A January 2012 national newspaper article suggested that Iarnród Éireann was expected to seek permission from the National Transport Authority to close the Limerick–Ballybrophy railway line. An enhanced timetable was operated between February 2012 and January 2013 before services were downgraded again.

== Features ==
3 km (2 mi) from the town is a Cistercian monastery, Mount St. Joseph Abbey, and a boarding school for boys, Cistercian College.

== Buildings of note ==
The Round Tower in Church Street is a national monument in state ownership. In addition there are several other buildings and structures in Roscrea listed on the National Inventory of Architectural Heritage including,

- Damer House, listed as being of special architectural, artistic, archaeological, historical and social interest.
- Roscrea railway station is listed as being of special architectural and social interest.
- The railway signal box is listed as being of special architectural interest.
- Former Quaker meetinghouse listed as being of architectural and social interest.
- The 19th Century Fancy Fountain now located in Rosemary Square is listed as being of artistic, social and technical interest.

== History ==
=== Early history and medieval period c. 550 – c. 1500 ===
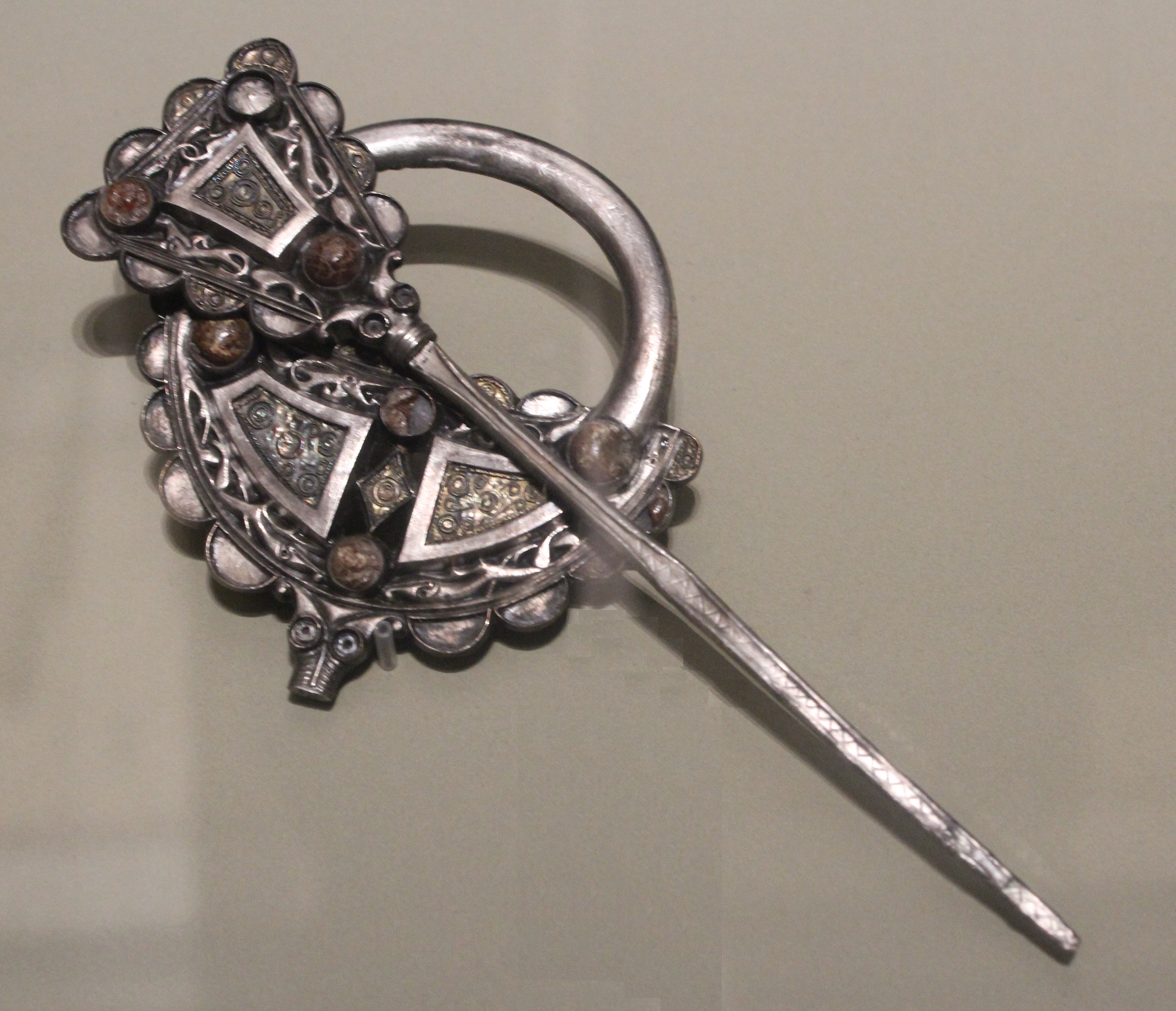
The 9th century Roscrea Brooch was found in or near the town sometime in the early 1820s

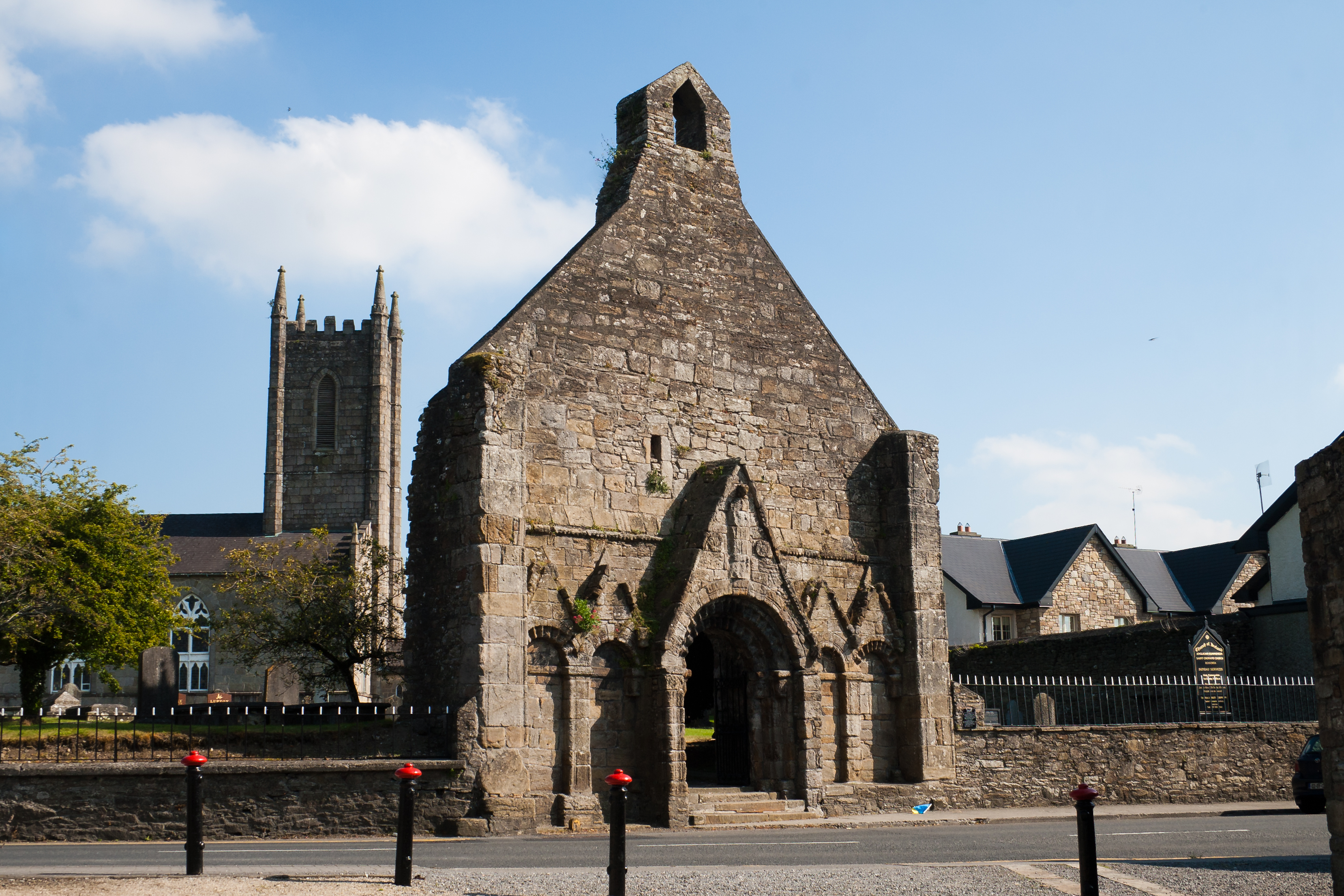
Surviving west gable of the 12th-century Romanesque Church with the Anglican parish church in the background.

Roscrea has historically been an important trading town. The settlement grew around an ancient church or monastery, founded by St. Cronan in the late 6th century. The town is situated strategically in a gap in the hills on one of the great ancient roads of Ireland, the Slighe Dála. It became an important ecclesiastical centre evidenced by the beautiful west gable of a Romanesque church, a 12th-century sculptured High Cross, and a round tower also built during the 12th century. The round tower has a doorway 4.6 m (15 ft) from the ground and is the oldest surviving part of the ancient monastery. The usual conical cap is missing as the tower was shortened by around 6 m (20 ft) when it was used by snipers in the 1798 rebellion. The 8th century Book of Dimma, which belonged to Roscrea monastery, is preserved in Trinity College, Dublin. It contains a copy of the Gospels and a Missa Infirmorum, and is enclosed in a shrine of bronze with silver plates ornamented with Celtic interlacing.

In 1812, the Romanesque church was demolished with the exception of the west gable and its stones used for the erection of the current St. Cronan's parish church of the Church of Ireland at the same site. The church was designed by the Roscrea architect James Sheane and restored under the supervision of Sir Thomas Newenham Deane in 1879. Records show that John Wesley, one of the founders of the Methodist movement, preached in Roscrea on 26 June 1750. Roscrea was one of the main settlements in the ancient and medieval Munster kingdom of Éile (commonly anglicised as Ely) and was briefly a diocesan see in the 12th century, before the superior power of the O'Briens ensured that the Roscrea was incorporated into the diocese of Killaloe.

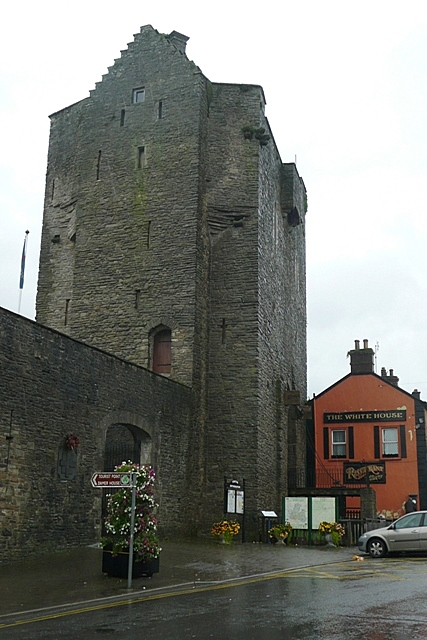
Gate Tower of Roscrea Castle

John, King of England (reigned 1199–1216) is credited with having erected a castle at Roscrea in 1213, of which a circular tower and some sections of wall are still extant; such castles were built as part of a policy to consolidate the Norman conquest of the midlands. In 1209 King John's officials established twelve shires or counties in Leinster and Munster, one of which was Tipperary, covering areas of English settlement such as Roscrea. Within county Tipperary there were fourteen baronies; Roscrea was the chief town in the barony of Ikerrin; baronies became obsolete after the Local Government Act (1898), which set up county and borough/town councils. From the mid-14th century (particularly after the Black Death) and 15th century native Irish influence the areas outside of the English Pale revived, strengthened by the intermarrying of the Norman aristocracy with the native Irish aristocracy.

The building of a castle at Roscrea was the subject of dispute between the king's representatives and the bishops of Killaloe until 1280, as the castle was built on church land without the bishop's permission. Though the castle was built as a royal castle, it was often in the hands of the Butlers as they controlled the surrounding lands and was close to Nenagh, where the Butlers had one of their principal castles. The castle was rebuilt in stone between 1276 and 1281, probably as part of King Edward I's orders to secure safe storage and transport of mined silver from the Silvermines to the west of Nenagh. Large-scale mining of silver ceased at the Silvermines in the early 14th century following disputes with local people and as a result of Gaelic resurgence in the area. The later rectangular gate house, known as Ormonde Castle, was built by James Butler, 4th Earl of Ormond sometime before 1450[15] and still stands today. There are also references to a gaol in Roscrea Castle during the period c. 1280–1315.

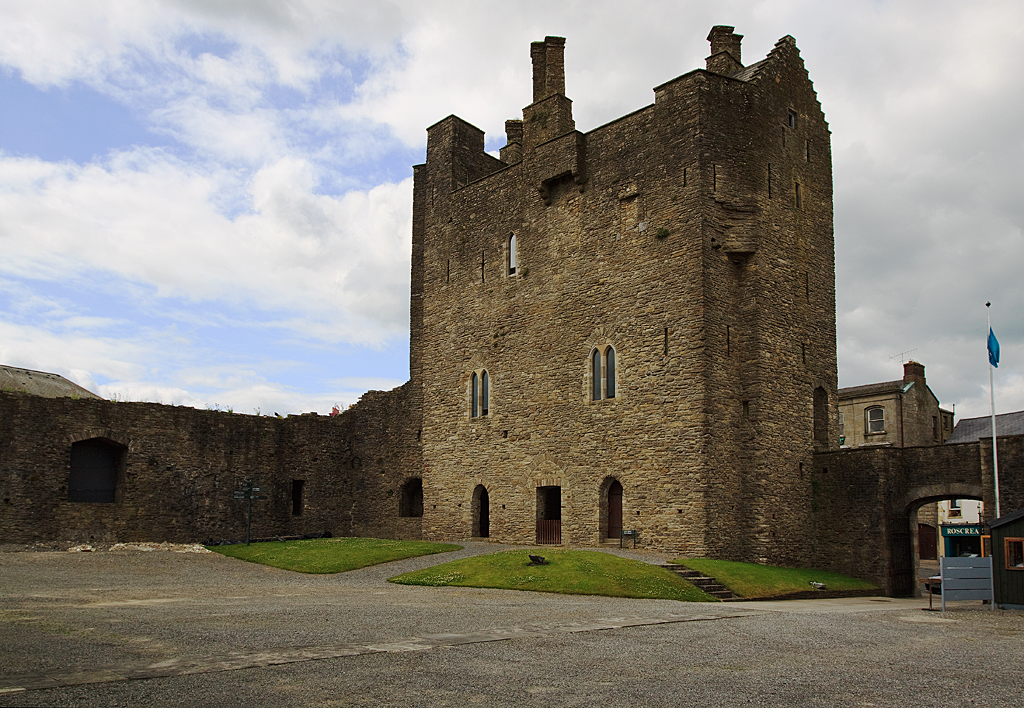
Roscrea Castle

There is no surviving reference to the granting of a royal charter for the founding of Roscrea and it is likely that the town began to grow around the castle in the 13th century, adding to the existing ecclesiastical settlements. There are references to 'the burgesses of Roscrea', two mills and a town oven, which is accepted as proof that Roscrea was a medieval town. In 1315, when Sir Edmund Butler was created 1st earl of Carrick (he later distinguished himself during the Bruce Invasion of Ireland), he was granted the castle and manors of Carrick and Roscrea, along with the attached lands. The castle remained in the Butler earl of Ormond's possession until it was sold by the 2nd duke of Ormond in 1703. The earls of Ormond had good relations with the local Éile (Ely) O'Carroll family, the ancient Gaelic lords of the area, and intermarried with them. The earls were largely absent from Ireland between c. 1464–1514, being engaged in the Wars of the Roses in England, and left the running of their lands to junior members of their extended family. Today the Catholic church of St. Cronin is built close to the site of a ruined Franciscan friary, which was founded by the O'Carrolls about 1477. Some portion of the walls of the old Friary has been retained in the modern church building.

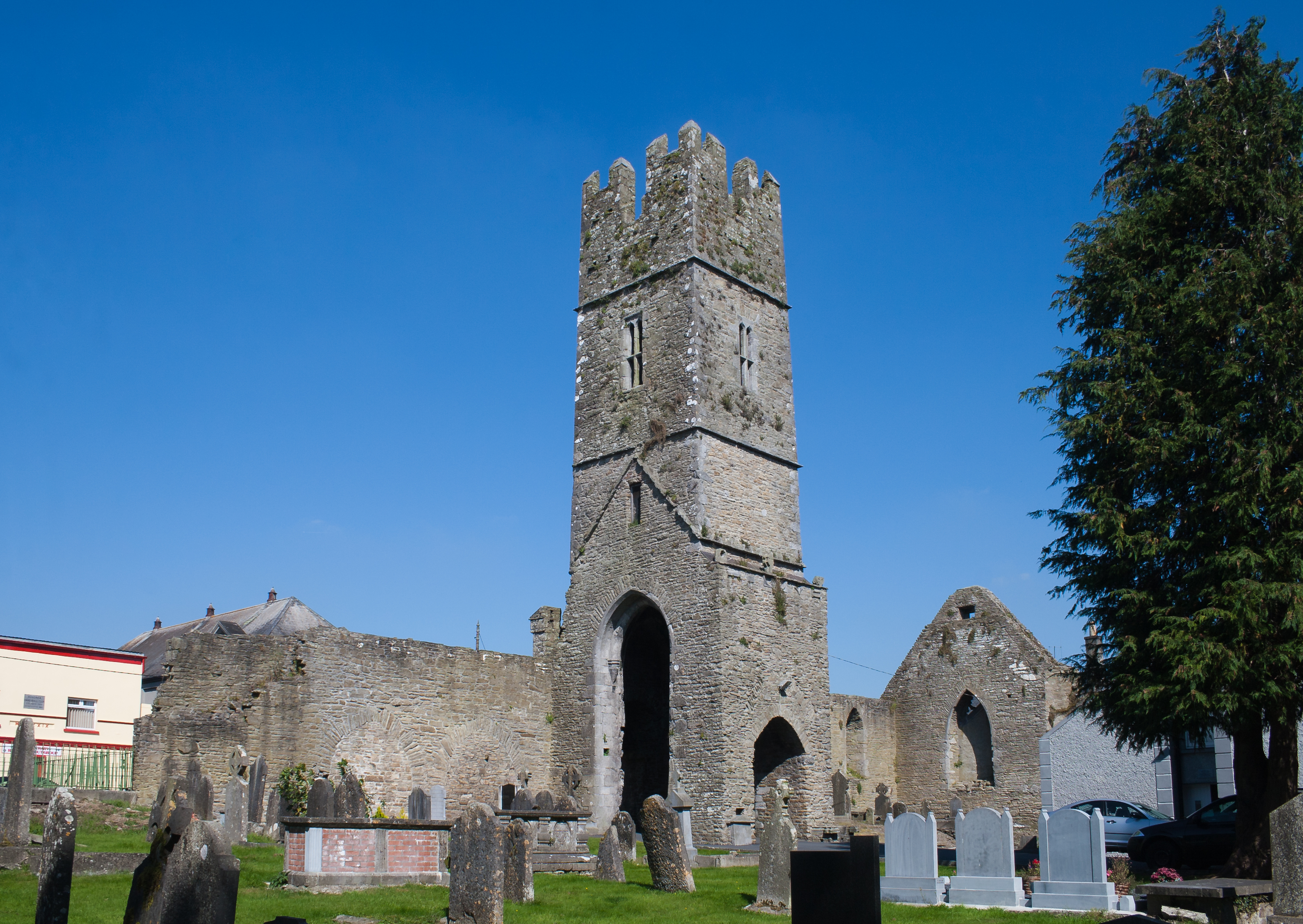
Remains of the 15th-century Franciscan Friary

=== Early modern period to 19th century ===
The expanding power of the O'Brien earls of Thomand from the West and the Fitzgerald earls of Kildare from the east caused a weakening of Butler authority and to Roscrea being controlled by the Gaelic lords of Éile, the O'Carroll's, for several decades. Despite attempts of the Butlers to re-conquer northern Tipperary in the 1530s a manuscript in the National Library, probably dating from the time of the Irish 'Reformation Parliament' of 1536–37 describes Roscrea as being then by 'Irishmen wasted, and not valuable'. The whole of northern and western Tipperary freed itself from Butler power after the death of the 9th earl of Ormond in 1546 and Roscrea remained virtually uninhabited for some years. The O'Carrolls fought wars with the Butlers in 1556–57, 1560–61 and 1564–66 but it was not until 'Black Tom' Butler, the 10th earl of Ormond, returned home from England that Roscrea was again under the control of the Butlers. During this time Roscrea lay on the northern edge of the County Palatinate of Tipperary (a territorial area administered from Kilkenny in which legal jurisdiction was held by Butler Earls of Ormond, rather than the King, but with royal permission). One of the benefits was that the Earl appointed the local judges and sheriffs to administer the law in Roscrea and gave the town some protection during this turbulent period. The plantations of King's County (now Offaly) and Queen's County (now Laois) from 1556 and the failure of the two Desmond Rebellions (1569–1573 and 1579–1583) saw the Gaelic lands to the north, west and south of Roscrea increasingly fall into New English hands.

The friary at Roscrea, which had escaped dissolution, was finally suppressed in 1579. The conclusion of the Nine Years' War (1594–1603), again lost by the Gaelic Irish, brought some stability to Ireland however the commencement of the plantations from 1606 set the scene for the great 1641 rebellion. The development of the town was affected by the Ormond succession dispute which broke out in 1614. During this time Roscrea was leased out by the earls of Ormond first to Gerard fitz Lewis Bryan and then Sir George Hamilton Sr. and Jr. The castle was taken by Owen Roe O'Neill in 1649 during the Irish Confederate Wars (1641–1653) and was recaptured by Cromwellian troops in 1650. The castle, town, lands and friary of Roscrea were granted to Sir Francis Peisley in 1659 for 21 years. The town was not caught up in the Williamite Wars (1689–91) and though orders were issued to have the castle demolished to prevent it from falling into rebel hands in the future they were later rescinded. In 1703 the 2nd duke of Ormond sold the town to Robert Curtis, the Tipperary Palatinate was abolished by the Dublin parliament following the defection of the 2nd duke to join the English Catholic monarchy in exile in Louis XIV's France in 1714. John Damer purchased the town in 1722 and soon after building Damer House within the walls of the castle. During the 18th century Joseph Damer (created Baron Milton in 1762 and later created the Earl of Dorchester in 1792) owned Roscrea but the titles died out on the death of his son the 2nd earl of Dorchester in 1808. Damer House and the castle became a military barracks and in 1811 was garrisoned by permanent cavalry (1 officer, 21 privates and 16 horses) and permanent infantry (8 officers and 345 privates). When Damer's daughter died in 1828 the Damer estates (possibly over 16,000 hectares (40,000 acres) of land) were inherited by his grand-nephew John Dawson 2nd earl of Portarlington. Dawson died in considerable debt in 1844/5, Court of Chancery records from 1863 describe the estate of Roscrea in 1844 as comprising 910 hectares (2,248 acres) worth £3,882 in rent yearly. The town was then sold for £20,000 to the Irish Landed Estates Court which eventually sold the town in a succession of land sales from the mid-19th century, including the town and two town parks of Roscrea in 1858. Most of the town was sold to R.S. Palmer in March 1859 and July 1860. It is from this time that much of the modern town of Roscrea was constructed.

Roscrea Poor law union was declared in 1839 and covered an area of 630 km^{2} (242 sq mi); 37 'Guardians' oversaw the operations of Union. The Union was responsible for a population of 61,374 in 1831 – it covered Bourney, Borrisnafarney, Killea, Killevinogue, Rathnaveoge, Roscrea, Agahancon, Cullenwale, Dunkerrin, Ettagh, Kilcommon, Kilmurry, Roscomroe, Shinrone, Borris-in-Ossory, Doanmore, Eirke, Kyle and Rathdowney until after boundary changes following the famine in 1853 (spellings of placenames are repeated from original records). A new Roscrea Union workhouse was erected on a 2.4-hectare (6-acre) site around 1.5 km (1 mi) outside of the town on the Templemore road adjacent to Corville. The workhouse could accommodate up to 700 'inmates' and was declared fit for the reception of paupers in March 1842; it received its first admissions during May 1842. During the famine, an additional 200 people were accommodated in the workhouse and a fever hospital was built on the site around this time. A large graveyard, probably containing the remains of hundreds of people who died in the Great Famine, was situated behind the workhouse to the south of Kennedy Park. The workhouse was partially demolished and altered, it became a fever hospital and a 'County Home"for the 'aged and infirm". It was closed in 1985/6 and demolished c. 1991.

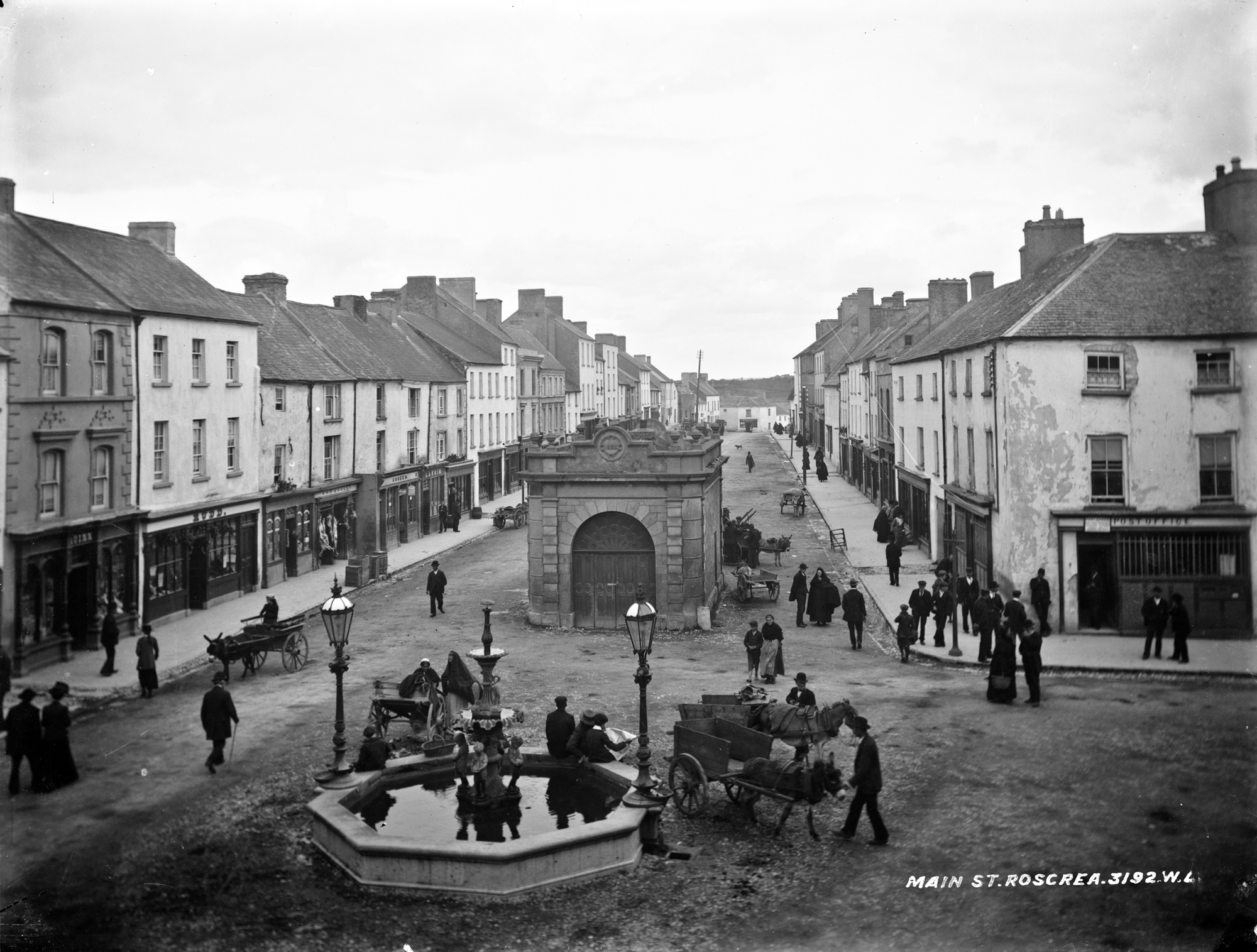
Main Street c. 1890 – c. 1905

== Demographics ==
While the population of Roscrea appeared to have reached its maximum in the 1830s (see below), this was exceeded in the 2022 census of Ireland. In 1885 a wool merchant from the neighbouring town of Birr reported to the House of Commons Select Committee on Industries (Ireland) that in the early decades of the 19th century 1,000 men were employed in Roscrea as weavers and wool combers, but that by the early 1880s this number had dropped to just 2.

Historical and Current Population of Roscrea:

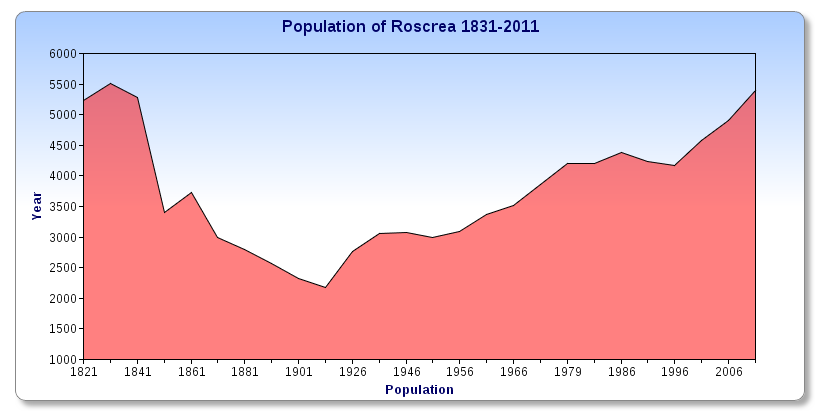
Population of Roscrea 1831–2011

Census Year	Population	Census Year	Population
1821	5,239	1951	2,988
1831	5,512	1956	3,095
1841	5,275	1961	3,372
1851	3,400	1966	3,523
1861	3,727	1971	3,855
1871	2,992	1979	4,203
1881	2,801	1981	4,201
1891	2,568	1986	4,378
1901	2,325	1991	4,231
1911	2,182	1996	4,170
1926	2,772	2002	4,578
1936	3,060	2006	4,910
1946	3,069	2011	5,403
		2016	5,446
		2022	5,542

In 2022, there were 5,542 people residing in Roscrea. In 2022, according to the CSO, the town is 72.4% White Irish and 2.7% Irish Traveller, 14.9% White of any other background, 0.3% Black, 2.05% Asian, 0.9% any other racial background, and 5.5% not stated.

=== Annalistic references ===
See Annals of Inisfallen (AI)

- AI761.1 Kl. Suairlech, abbot of Bennchor, and Daniél, abbot of Ros Cré, fell asleep.
- AI952.1 Kl. Repose of Orthanach, abbot of Ros Cré.
- AI1009.3 Muiredach Ua Maenaig, abbot of Ros Cré, went on his pilgrimage.
- AI1012.5 Repose of Loingsech son of Lonán, abbot of Ros Cré.

== Commerce ==
The main employer in the town is Glanbia which makes and distributes meats product all over the world. In 2008 Glanbia sold off its pork operations. The 2 former Glanbia plants in Roscrea are now part of the Rosderra Irish Meats Group. It still uses the Glanbia brand under licence. This enterprise grew out of the Roscrea Bacon Factory, established in the late 1800s as one of the first cooperatives in Ireland, with legal underpinnings established by local solicitor Charles J Spain. Taro Pharmaceuticals was a sterile pharmaceutical injectables manufacturing plant in the town that employed approximately 30 people. The plant has since closed. FRS Network is a large employer with over 100 people employed across its varying divisions. Some people travel to Nenagh to work in the Procter & Gamble factory there. Some make lengthy commutes to Dublin or Limerick for work. Shannon Development has a business park near Ashbury in the town. This houses local businesses like Walsh Printers and JS Hygiene (Upholstery cleaning). The other business park is at Benamore on the Dublin road. Dunnes Stores developed the site of the maltings into a large retail unit. The new Tesco supermarket was built in close proximity to the Round Tower, leading to queries about compliance with planning rules.

== Education ==
The town is home to several educational institutions. Primary Schools include St. Cronan's National School, Scoil Eoin Naofa, Scoil Íosaf Naofa Corville, Sacred Heart Primary School, Dunkerrin N.S., Lismackin N.S. and the school for Persons with Intellectual Disabilities St Anne's. The solitary secondary school in the town is Coláiste Phobal Ros Cré. This school was formed when the Sacred Heart Convent, the Christian Brothers School and the Vocational School amalgamated to form one public school in 1999. Just outside Roscrea is the Cistercian College. This is a private school located on the grounds of the Mount St Joseph Cistercian Monastery. Third-level courses, accredited by FETAC are provided at the Colaiste. The nearest Third-Level Institute is Tipperary Institute in Thurles.

== Sport ==
=== Rugby, Soccer, Martial Arts ===
Roscrea Rugby Club has been twinned with Holybush in Wales for over 50 years. There are also some football (soccer) teams in the town – Killavilla United, Roscrea United and Streamstown Celtic A martial arts club Premier Martial Arts Academy has introduced the sport of Brazilian Jiu-Jitsu and MMA to many of Roscrea's youth and continues to offer a vital alternative sporting outlet to the area. O.s.a premier taekwondo have been operating a taekwondo academy in roscrea for over 25 years and have produced over 50 black belts and many national and European champions.

=== GAA ===
Roscrea GAA has won few trophies in its history. The local Gaelic football club is Inane Rovers. Roscrea Hurling Club were the first-ever All-Ireland club Hurling Champions in 1971.

=== Other sporting facilities ===
Roscrea has an 18-hole parkland golf course (Roscrea Golf Club est. 1894) and also tennis facilities. There is an athletics club, a badminton club and many more sporting clubs. A swimming pool and leisure centre complex opened in September 2009.

== Voluntary and community groups ==
Roscrea is home to a Scout troop, Roscrea Scout Troop, founded in 1971, covering all sections from Beaver Scouts to Rover Scouts. The troop is part of the Slieve Bloom Scout County in the South-Eastern Province in Scouting Ireland.

The international speaking organisation, Toastmasters also have a branch in town. Recently, Roscrea Active Citizenship Association was set up, with the stated aim of bringing together all the organisations of the town.

== Notable people ==
- Daisy Bates (1859–1951), born Margaret Dwyer; in Australia journalist, activist and amateur anthropologist
- Kevin Carroll, prosthetist; made Winter the dolphin's prosthetic tail (subject of the Dolphin Tale movie); recipient of the Roscrea People of the Year International Award.
- Michael A. Hess (1952–1995), born Anthony Lee, son of Philomena Lee; US lawyer
- Brody Lee, professional footballer
- Marty Maher (1876–1961), US Army instructor (and subject of the 1955 film The Long Gray Line)
- Johnny 'Smacks' McMahon, Irish comedian and podcaster
- John Moyney (1895–1980), soldier; recipient of the Victoria Cross
- Harry Read (1888–1972), represented Ireland in rugby union and first class cricket
- George Thomas (c. 1756–1802), soldier, "Raja of Hansi" in India

== See also ==
- List of towns and villages in Ireland
