= St. Cronan's Church =

St. Cronan's Church may refer to:

- St Cronan's Church, Gortarevan, County Offaly
- St. Cronan's Church, Roscrea (Church of Ireland), a 19th-century Church of Ireland church in Tipperary, Ireland, and 12th century church of the same name
- St. Cronan's Church, Roscrea (Roman Catholic), a 19th-century Roman Catholic church in Tipperary, Ireland
- St. Cronan's Church, Tuamgraney, a 10th-century Church of Ireland church in Clare, Ireland
