= Birdhill railway station =

Station in County Tipperary, Ireland

Coordinates: 52°45′57″N 8°26′31″W

Birdhill Cnocán an Éin Fhinn
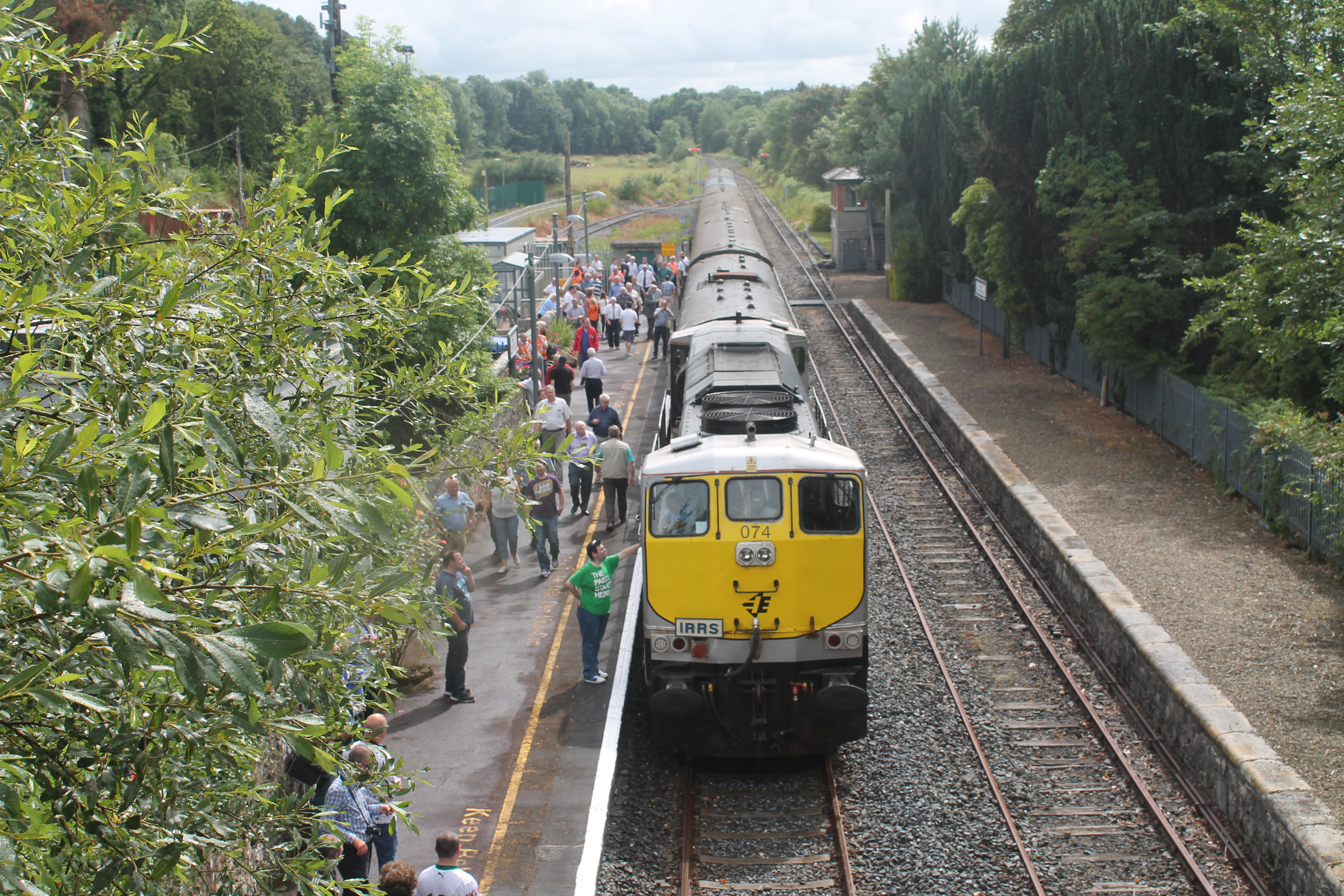
- An IRRS 071 Class Railtour at Birdhill.

General information
- Location: Birdhill; Ireland
- Owner: Iarnród Éireann
- Operator: Iarnród Éireann
- Platforms: 2 (only 1 in use)
- Bus operators: Bus Éireann
- Connections: 72; 323; 323X

Construction
- Structure type: At-grade

Key dates
- 1860: Opened
- 1963: Closed To Goods
Location

Birdhill railway station serves the town of Birdhill in County Tipperary, Ireland.

The station opened on 23 July 1860 as an extension from Castleconnell by the Limerick and Castleconnell Railway. The line was extended to Killaloe on 12 April 1862 and became a junction when the line was further extended from Birdill to Nenagh on 1 June 1864 by the Great Southern & Western Railway creating a through route to Limerick via Ballybrophy. The line to Killaloe lost its passenger services on 17 July 1931 and goods traffic was suspended on 29 April 1944 as an emergency measure by the Great Southern Railways.

It is on the Limerick–Ballybrophy railway line and is also served by a skeleton service on the Limerick to Nenagh Commuter Service.

== Description ==
The station once had a large station house but now has only a portable building. This houses the ticket office and toilet. The station has a car park. A plaque in the station grounds commemorates the 150th anniversary of the station, which took place in 2010. There is also a "Railway Garden" beside the station. The signal cabin has 24 levers and is at the Killonan end of the Up platform (which is not in service) and is a crossing point and blockpost, using "C" pattern staff. Both the signal cabin and railway bridge are both listed as protected structures by Tipperary County Council (RPS Refs S708 and S709).

== Services ==
As of 2023, Birdhill receives the following skeleton service:

Monday to Saturdays

- 2 trains per day to Limerick Colbert.
  - An extra train per day to Limerick Colbert operates on Mondays to Fridays only and starts at Nenagh.
- 2 trains per day to Ballybrophy.

Sundays

- 1 train to Limerick Colbert
- 1 train to Ballybrophy

== Closure proposed ==
A January 2012 national newspaper article suggested that Irish Rail was expected to seek permission from the National Transport Authority to close the line. In response, the timetable was altered during 2012, and the service was again reduced from February 2013. In November 2016 it was announced the line was very likely to close in 2018 as the demand for the service is very low and CIE/IE wish to close it to save money.

Preceding station	Iarnród Éireann	Following station
Castleconnell	Commuter; Limerick-Ballybrophy	Nenagh
