= James Sheane =

- Born: between 1772 and 1778; Roscrea, County Tipperary, Ireland
- Died: 1816
- Occupation: Architect

James Sheane (born 1772–78, died 1816) was an architect from Roscrea, County Tipperary, Ireland.

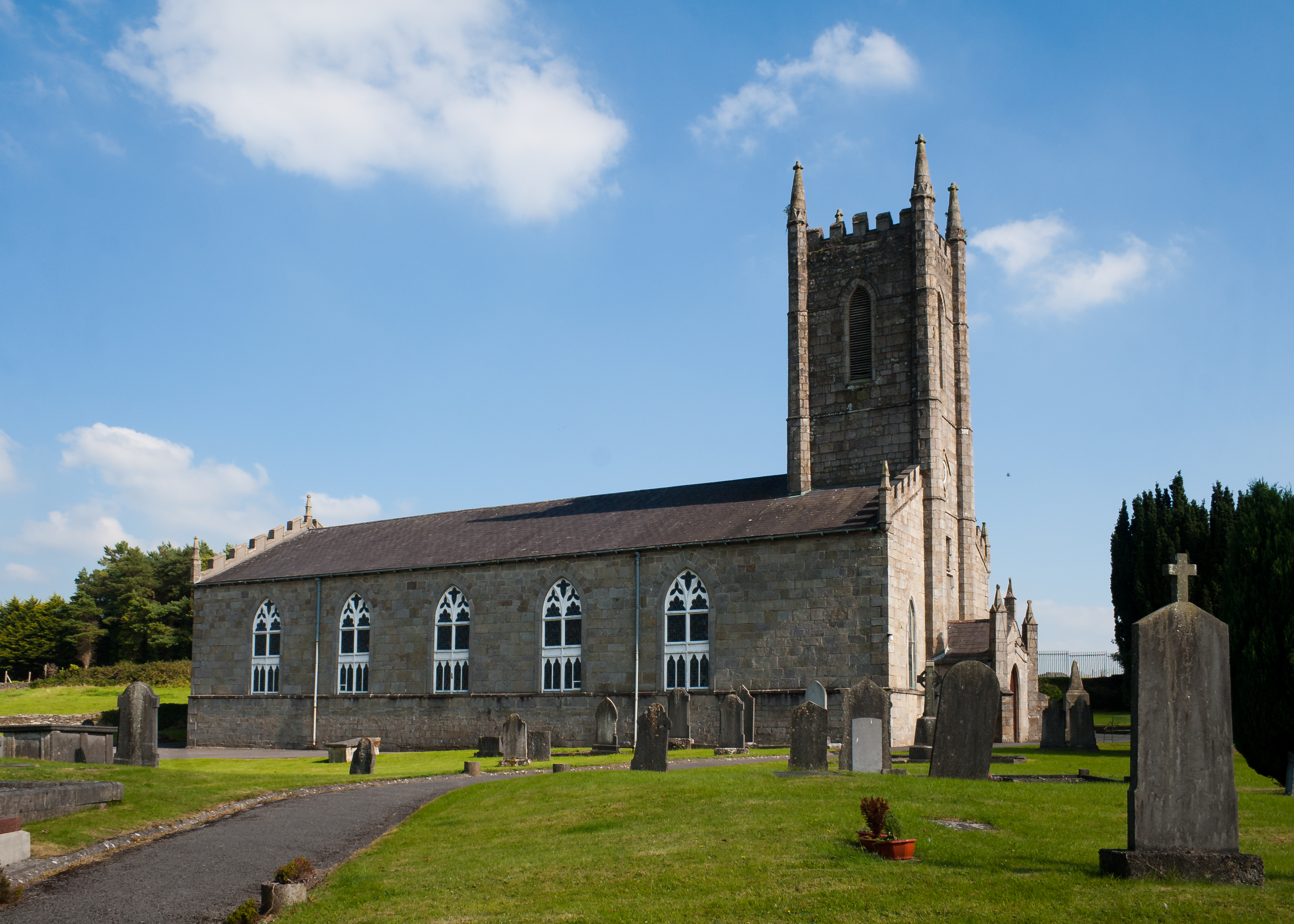
St. Cronan's Church, Roscrea (1812), designed by Sheane

== Career ==
Sheane designed St. Cronan's Church, Roscrea, as well as glebe houses at Modreeny and Kilrushall in the Church of Ireland diocese of Killaloe.

== Personal life ==
Sheane married Anne Cole, daughter of James Cole. They had one son, also named James, who was born in 1812. The family lived on a 279-acre estate named Manor House in Mountmellick, County Laois. Sheane Senior died in 1816 and was buried in the graveyard of St. Cronan's Church, which he had designed. Sheane Junior died on 30 October 1877 in Manor House. He was survived by his son James Cole Sheane.
