= Nenagh railway station =

Railway station in Mid-West region of Ireland

Nenagh An tAonach
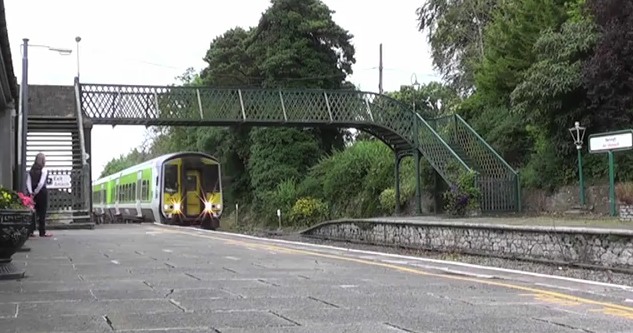
- 2721 Arrives from Limerick

General information
- Location: Nenagh; County Tipperary; Ireland
- Coordinates: 52.8611°N 8.1933°W
- Owner: Iarnród Éireann
- Operator: Iarnród Éireann
- Platforms: 1
- Bus operators: Bus Éireann; TFI Local Link
- Connections: 322; 324; 854

Construction
- Structure type: At-grade
- Parking: 161 Spaces
- Cycle facilities: Sheltered bike parking available
Location

Nenagh railway station serves the town of Nenagh and surrounding area in County Tipperary, in the Mid-West Region of Ireland.

The station is located on Martyrs Road, Tyone, Nenagh. It opened on 5 October 1863 and is on the Limerick-Ballybrophy railway line, located between Birdhill railway station and Cloughjordan railway station. Passengers can connect at Ballybrophy to trains heading northeast to Dublin or southwest to Cork or Tralee.

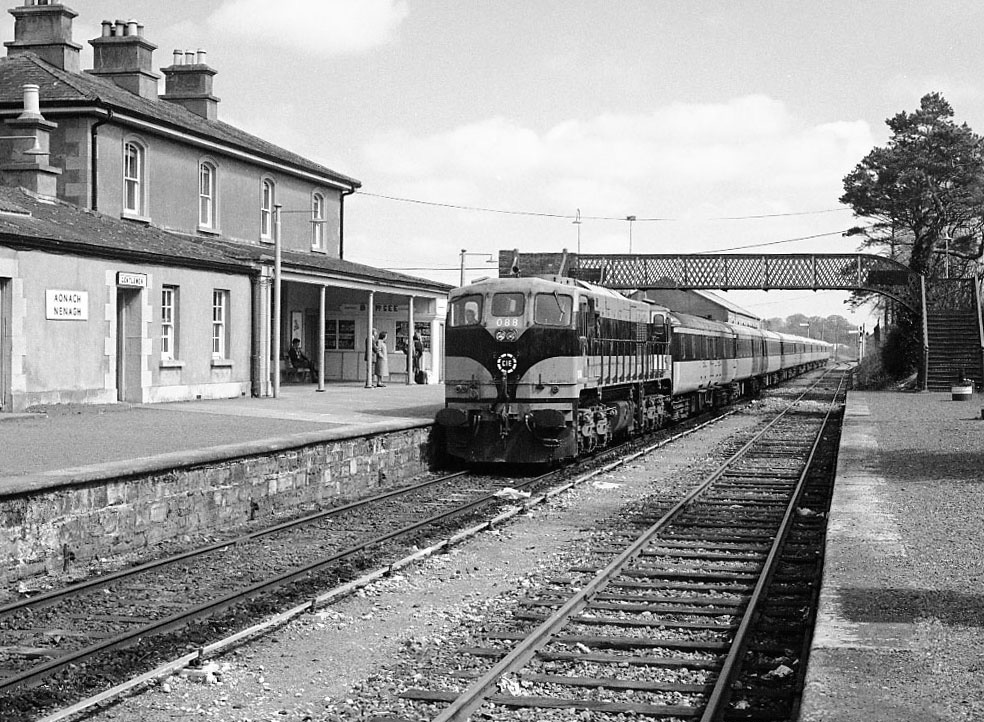
Train at Nenagh station in 1984

The buildings consist of a two-storey station house with a platform canopy supported on cast iron columns, a goods shed and a disused cast iron footbridge. The station is unstaffed and has a car park and sheltered bicycle parking.

== Services ==
As of 2021, services were as follows:

Mon – Sat

- 2 trains to Limerick Colbert (3 trains Mon – Fri)
- 2 trains to Ballybrophy

Sundays

- 1 train to Limerick Colbert
- 1 train to Ballybrophy

== See also ==
- List of railway stations in Ireland

Preceding station	Iarnród Éireann	Following station
Birdhill	Commuter; Limerick-Ballybrophy	Cloughjordan
