= Éile =

Medieval Irish petty kingdom

Éile (Modern Irish: [ˈeːlʲə]; Old Irish: Éle, Éli), commonly anglicised as Ely, was a medieval petty kingdom in the southern part of the modern county of Offaly and parts of North Tipperary in Ireland. The historic barony of Eliogarty was once a significant portion of the kingdom.

== Overview ==
The clan or people of Éile claimed descent from Cian, a younger son of Ailill Aulom and brother of Eógan Mór, and thus had kinship with the Eóganachta. It has been suggested that the Éile were actually of Laigin origin, and that they may in fact have been the rulers of the Cashel area before the rise of the Eóganachta, as suggested by their role in Eóganachta origin tales, such as the Senchas Fagbála Caisil. Their name is also associated with Cruachán Brí Éile the original name of Croghan Hill. Historian C. Thomas Cairney, stated that the Ely were from the tribes known as the Laigin who also had a branch known as the Dumnonii and who were the third wave of Celts to settle in Ireland during the first century BC.

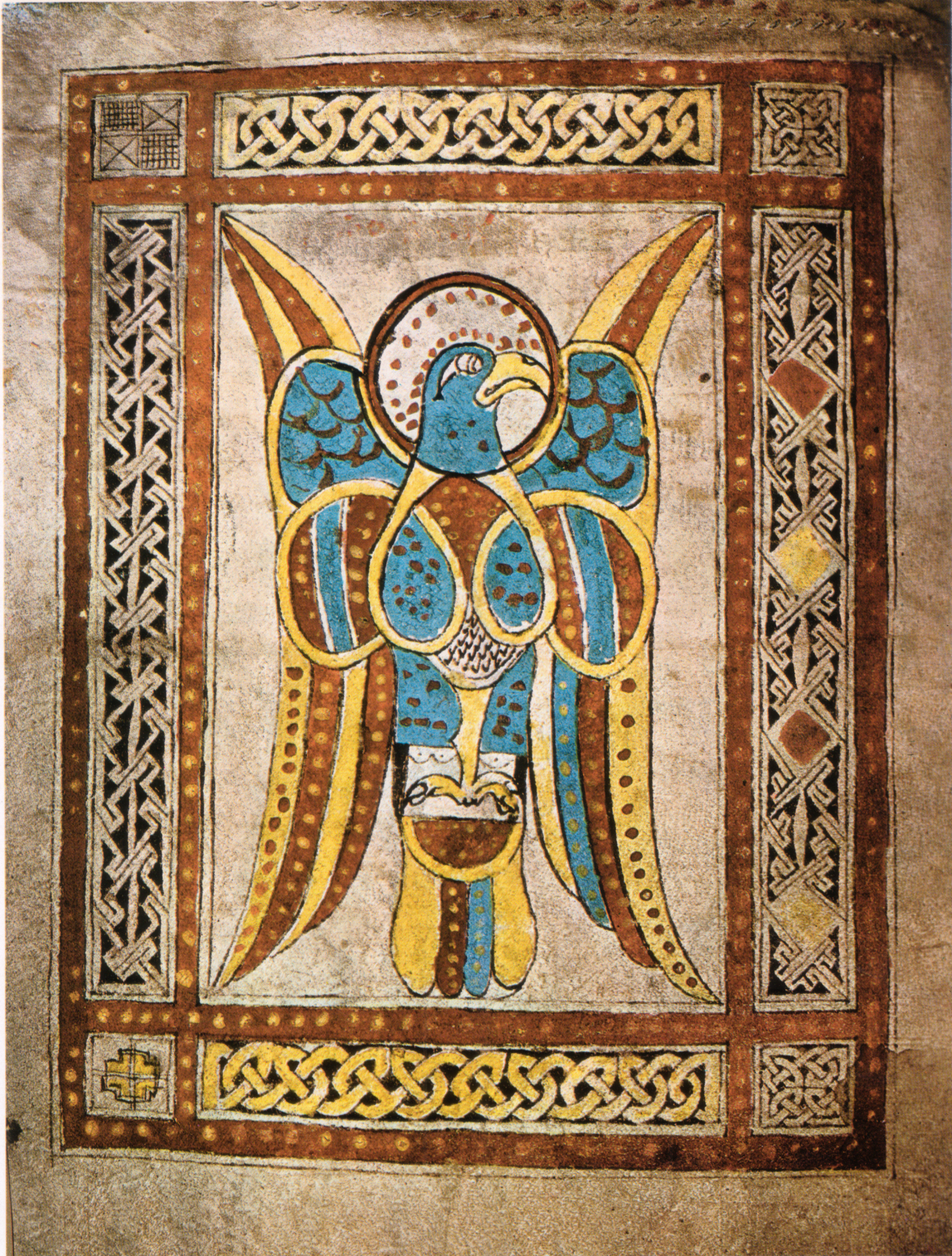
A 7th century artistic work for the Gospel of St. John in the Book of Dimma from the Roscrea monastery.

Several early Christian monasteries existed within the boundaries of the kingdom. This includes Birr established by St. Brendan of Birr (which held the Synod of Birr in 697) and Liathmore, which was established by St. Mochoemoc (a nephew of St. Íte of Killeedy). St. Crónán of Roscrea, who was born in the kingdom, established Roscrea in the 7th century. One of his monks created the Book of Dimma, which had a richly decorated cumdach created for it on order of the O'Carroll kings.

By the 12th-century it was much reduced in size, bounded to the north by the Kingdom of Mide, to the south by Cashel, to the east by the Kingdom of Ossory and the Múscraige Tíre to the west in Ormond. It was divided into two principal regions or lordships, named for their respective ruling families: Éile Uí Chearbhaill in the north and Éile Uí Fhogartaigh in the south.

== Éile Uí Chearbhaill ==
The northern lordship, Éile Uí Chearbhaill (Ely O'Carroll), was ruled by the O'Carroll family. It included the later baronies of Clonlisk and Ballybritt, which after the Norman invasion of Ireland, were added to the Earl of Ormond's county palatine, now County Tipperary in the province of Munster. The earls lost effective control of the area during the Gaelic Resurgence. In 1606, after the Tudor reconquest, it was transferred from Tipperary to the recently created King's County (now Offaly) in the province of Leinster. This was to reduce the influence of the Earl of Ormond and the Presidency of Munster. The former boundary between Ely O'Carroll and the ancient Kingdom of Mide is coterminous with the present boundary between the diocese of Killaloe and the diocese of Meath. That portion of County Offaly which belongs to the diocese of Killaloe was Ely O'Carroll and originally belonged to Munster.

Around 2000, Shannon Development funded "Ely O'Carroll Tourism", an initiative to encourage heritage tourism in the region, based on the heritage towns of Roscrea and Birr.

=== Maryland connection ===
Descended from the O'Carroll princes are the prominent Carroll family of Maryland in the United States. Charles Carroll of Carrollton was a signatory of the United States Declaration of Independence. His branch of the family has been seated at Doughoregan Manor for over two centuries. Charles Carroll the Barrister, a cousin, descended from among the very last lords of Éile. Mount Clare was his home in Maryland.

In 2000, Ely O'Carroll Tourism arranged for North Tipperary County Council to arrange the twinning of Ely O'Carroll with Baltimore in Maryland to mark the Carroll connection. By 2015, the twinning was inactive.

== Éile Uí Fhogartaigh ==
The southern lordship, Éile Uí Fhogartaigh (Ely O'Fogarty) was in Munster and ruled by the O'Fogarty family, who may have been of a different imposed lineage from the O'Carrolls, possibly Dalcassian. Alternatively, they were actually kindred but regional politics influenced later genealogists to associate them with different provincial dynasties at different periods. John O'Hart finds an Uí Néill descent from Fogartach mac Néill for the O'Fogartys. Ely O'Fogarty included the later baronies of Ikerrin and Eliogarty, which have been part of County Tipperary since Norman times. The native lords, Ó Meachair (Meagher) and O'Fogarty, were left in possession of their lands, but were obliged to pay tribute to the Earl of Ormond. The barony name of Eliogarty is derived from Ely O'Fogarty.

== Annalistic references ==
AI=Annals of Inisfallen. LC=Annals of Lough Ce. M=Annals of the Four Masters. C=Chronicon Scotorum.

- 571 - The battle of Tola, by Fiachna, son of Baedan, son of Cairell, against the people of Osraighe and Eile; and they were defeated. Tola is the name of a plain situated between Cluain Fearta Molua and Saighir.
- AI669 - Death of Forchellach, king of Éile.
- 707, The battle of Dola, in Magh Ele, where Leathlobhar, son of Eochaidh, Cu Allaidh, and Cu Dinaisc, were slain.
- AI744, Death of Ardgal, king of Éile.
- M757/T762, Fogartach, son of Eochaidh, lord of Eile died.
- M847, Tuathal, son of Ceallach, lord of Eile, died.
- 874 Donnchadh, son of Maelseachlainn, was mortally wounded by the Eili.
- 888, A battle was gained over the Eili by Maelguala and the men of Munster, at Caiseal, in which many noble youths were slain.
- 900 - A battle was gained by Ceallach, son of Cearbhall, and by the Osraighi, over the Eili and the Muscraighi, in which fell one hundred and ten persons, among whom was Techtegan, son of Uamnachan, lord of Eili, and many others of distinction.
- M903, Cnáimheini, mac Maenaigh, tighearna Ele, d'ég.
- M975 - Seachnasach mac h-Iruaidh tigherna Eile do mharbhadh.
- c. 1000 - Cearball mac Dublaidhe Duind appears king of Éile in MacLiacc poem Siath righ Gaela, glantar hi!
- AI1022 - Death of Gilla Pátraic son of Cerball, king of Éile.
- 1023 - Tadhg, mac Briain, mic Cindeittigh, do mharbhadh do Eilibh i fiull, iar na eráil dia bhrathair féin do Dhonnchadh, forrae.
- AI1028 - Death of Ua Dubchróin, king of Éile.
- LC1033 - Aimhergin Ua Cerbhaill, king of Eile, died.
- LC1033 - A victory was gained by the Eile, in which Braen Ua Clerigh, and Muiredhach, son of Mac Gillapatraic, et alii multi, were slain.
- U1033 - A rout was inflicted among the Éile in which Braen ua Cléirig and Muiredach grandson of Gilla Pátraic and many others fell.
- AI1033 - Braen Ua Cléirig, king of Éile, was killed.
- M1050 - Maelruanaidh, son of Cucoirne, lord of Eile, was killed by his own people.
- LC1050 - Maelruanaidh, grandson of Cucoirne, king of Eile, died.
- U1050 - Mael Ruanaid son of Cú Choirne, king of Éile, was killed (by his own people).
- LC1058 - Ribhardan, son of Cucoirne, king of Eile, fell.
- M1071 - The son of Righbhardan, son of Cucoirne, lord of Eile, was slain in a battle.
- M1072 - Ua Fogarta, lord of Eile, was killed by Ua Briain.
- AI1071 - Rígbardán's son, king of Éile, was slain.
- M1121 - Ríghbhardán, mac Con Choirne, tighearna Ele do écc.
- M1145 - Finn Ua Cearbhaill, Tanist of Eile, was killed.
- M1152 - Domhnall, son of Righbhardan, lord of Eile, was slain by the son of the Long-legged (An Chos Fhada) Ua Cearbhaill.
- AI1058.4 Tairdelbach Ua Briain brought the son of Mael na mBó, and the Laigin, Osraige, and foreigners with him to attack Brian's son, and they burned the greater part of In Machaire as far as Luimnech. And the Munstermen themselves burned Luunnech lest the other party should burn it, and they were engaged as they were turning out of it, and a few of the others and a good many of the Munstermen were slain, including Ua Lígda, erenagh of Imlech Ibuir, the son of Cú Choirne, king of Éile, and Ua Gébennaig, king of In Déis Bec.
- M1163 - The son of Finn Ua Cearbhaill, lord of North Eile, was slain by Domhnall, son of Toirdhealbhach.
- M1174, Ruaidri h-Úa Cerbaill [Rory O'Carroll], Lord of Ely, was slain in the middle of the island of Inish-cloghran.
- AI1174 - A hosting by the grey foreigners, and they came into Éile. Domnall Ua Briain and the Tuadmumu assembled [against them] at Durlas Ua Fócarta, and a battle was fought between them, in which the grey foreigners were defeated, seven hundred or somewhat more being slain.
- M1205 - The son of Guill-bhealach O'Carroll, Lord of Ely, was slain by the English.
- C1318 - A great victory was gained over the English in Ely, by O'Carroll; and Adam Mares and many other Englishmen were slain.
- C1399 - Tadc O Cerbaill, king of Ely, was captured by the Earl of Ormond this year.
- M1432 - A great war broke out between O'Carroll, Lord of Ely, and the Earl of Ormond; and the Earl marched at the head of a great army into Ely, ravaged the country, and demolished O'Carroll's two castles.
- M1443 - Maelruanaid O Cerbaill, king of Ely, died this year.

== See also ==
- Pre-Norman invasion Irish Celtic kinship groups, from whom many of the modern Irish surnames came from
- Eliogarty, barony in North Tipperary
- Ikerrin, barony in North Tipperary
- Thurles, stronghold of the O'Fogartys
- Ricamil, an O'Carroll site
- Birr Castle
- Leap Castle
- Crónán of Roscrea
