= Roscrea railway station =

Station in County Tipperary, Ireland

Roscrea Ros Cré
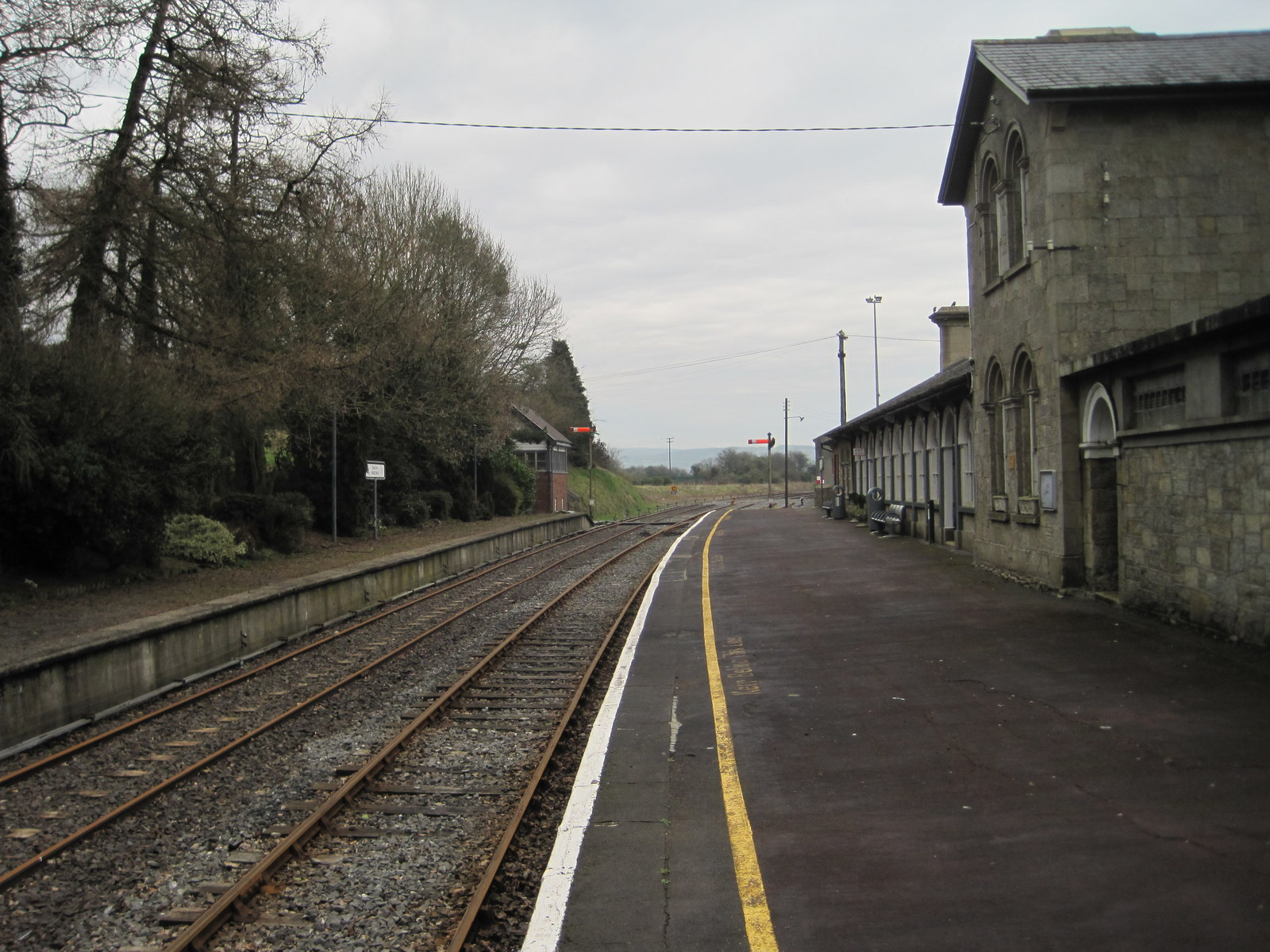

General information
- Location: Roscrea, County Tipperary; Ireland
- Coordinates: 52.9606°N 7.7945°W
- Operator: Iarnród Éireann
- Line: Limerick-Ballybrophy

History
- Opened: 19 October 1857

Services
Preceding station	Iarnród Éireann	Following station
Cloughjordan	Commuter; Limerick-Ballybrophy railway line	Ballybrophy
Location

Roscrea railway station serves the town of Roscrea, County Tipperary, in Ireland.

Roscrea station is on the Limerick-Ballybrophy railway line of the Irish railway network connecting to the main Cork-Dublin line at Ballybrophy. It is listed as a protected structure by Tipperary County Council (RPS Ref RC093). The station is staffed and has a car park. The station is 0.5 miles from Roscrea town centre.

== Services ==
Roscrea, as with many other stations on the same line, receives a small amount of services: 2 trains eastbound to Ballybrophy and 2 trains westbound to Limerick on Mondays to Saturdays. On Sundays, the station is served by 1 train per day each way.

== Bus Connection ==
=== Local Link ===
TFI Local Link bus stops at Roscrea Railway Station.

Timetable is 854 – (T45) Roscrea to Nenagh via Shinrone, Cloughjordan, Moneygall & Toomevara Timetable

== History ==
The station opened on 19 October 1857 from Ballybrophy. On 8 March 1858 the line was extended to Birr and became a junction when the line to Nenagh was opened on 5 October 1863 eventually forming a new through route to Limerick via Nenagh. The branch from Roscrea to Birr in County Offaly was closed by Coras Iompair Eireann on 1 January 1963.

=== Closure proposed ===
A January 2012 national newspaper article suggested that Irish Rail was expected to seek permission from the National Transport Authority to close the line. On a trial basis an enhanced timetable was in force during 2012 however the service was again reduced from February 2013. In November 2016 it was announced the line was very likely to close in 2018 as demand for the service was very low and CIE/IE wished to close it to save money.
