= Crónán of Roscrea =

Crónán
- Born: Ely O'Carroll, Ireland
- Died: 28 April 640; Ireland
- Venerated in: Orthodoxy; Roman Catholicism
- Feast: 28 April

Saint Crónán (died 640) was the abbot-bishop and patron of the diocese of Roscrea (an episcopal see later incorporated into the diocese of Killaloe), Ireland. He should not be confused with his contemporary Saint Crónán Mochua (died 637).

== Life ==
Crónán was born in the territory of Éile in Ireland. His father’s name was Odhran, while his mother came from west Clare. After spending his youth in Connacht, he returned to his native district around the year 610 and founded Roscrea Abbey, where he established a school. Previously he settled at a place known as Sean Ros or Loch Cré, which was a wooded morass far from the haunts of men. In fact, it was so wild that pilgrims would often get lost. As a result, St. Crónán abandoned it and moved to the woods of Cré, now known as Ros Cré, County Tipperary.

William Reeves notes that the Annals of Tigernach and the Annals of Ulster both describe Crónán as "bishop of Nendrum".

== Hagiography ==
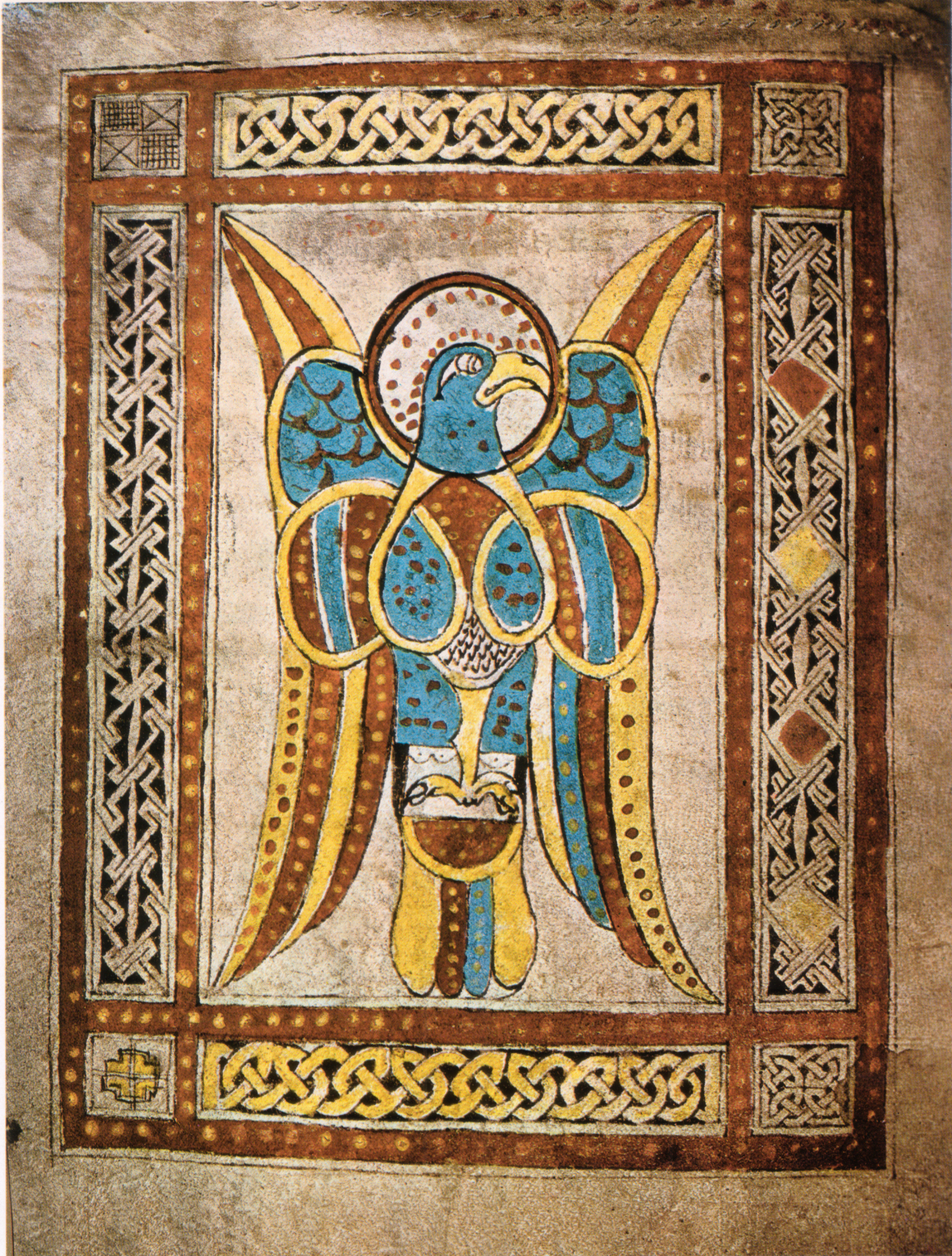
The Eagle symbol of St John the Evangelist from the Book of Dimma folio 104v. (Dublin, Trinity College, MS.A.IV.23).

Like those of so many other Irish saints, the Acts of St. Crónán abound in miracles. The most surprising, perhaps, is the legend concerning the transcribing of the Four Gospels by one of his monks, named Dimma, which is associated with the manuscript now known as the Book of Dimma. It appears that Dimma could only undertake one day's task, from sunrise to sunset. Crónán, however, bade him write, and then Dimma set to work, never ceasing until he had finished the Four Gospels, the sun continuing to shine for the space of forty days and forty nights - the scribe himself being unconscious that the work occupied more than one day. The scribe, Dimma MacNathi, signs his name at the conclusion of each of the Gospels, and he has been identified with Dimma, subsequently Bishop of Connor, who is mentioned with Crónán in the letter of Pope John IV in 640, regarding Pelagianism in Ireland, but this identification cannot be sustained.

The case containing the Book of Dimma was richly gilt by order of O'Carroll, Lord of Ely, in the twelfth century. Notwithstanding the conflicting statements arising from the number of contemporary Irish saints bearing the name Crónán, it is highly probable that St. Crónán of Roscrea, as les Petits Bollandistes say, lived as late as the year 640, and his death occurred on 28 April of that year.

Crónán is the patron of Roscrea, Tipperary; his feast day is 28 April.

== Legacy ==
Saint Cronan's Boys National School in Bray, County Wicklow in Ireland is named in his honour.

== See also ==
- Temple Cronan
