= Limerick–Ballybrophy railway line =

Railway line in Ireland

Limerick–Ballybrophy line
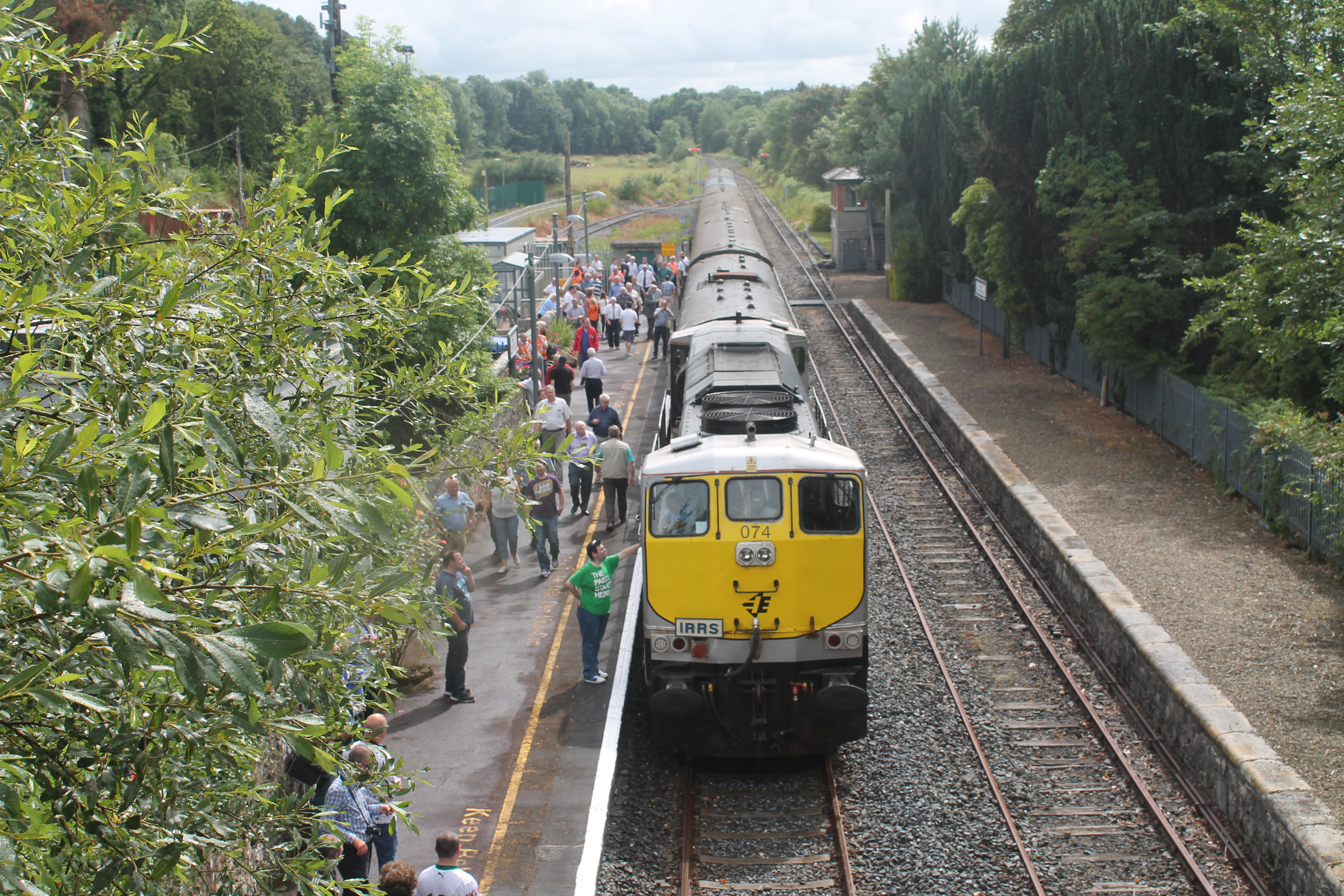
- Birdhill railway station in 2014

Overview
- Status: Operational
- Termini: Limerick Colbert; Ballybrophy
- Stations: 7

Service
- Type: Heavy rail, commuter rail
- System: Iarnród Éireann
- Services: Limerick–Ballybrophy
- Operator: Iarnród Éireann
- Rolling stock: 2800 Class

History
- Opened: 19 October 1857

Technical
- Line length: 52.5 mi (84.5 km)
- Num of tracks: 1
- Track gauge: 5 ft 3 in (1,600 mm) Irish gauge
- Operating speed: 30 mph (48 km/h)

The Limerick–Ballybrophy line is a 52.5 miles (84.5 km) railway line connecting the city of Limerick with Ballybrophy in County Laois. The line diverges from the Limerick to Limerick Junction railway line at Killonan Junction and continues in a north east direction with five intermediate stops at Castleconnell, Birdhill, Nenagh, Cloughjordan and Roscrea. The line ends at Ballybrophy where it joins the Dublin-Cork Main Line.

Services are infrequent, with two trains per weekday in each direction from Ballybrophy to Limerick. In addition, there is a commuter service, forming part of the Limerick Suburban Rail network, which has one train from Nenagh to Limerick. The commuter train service runs Mondays to Fridays. On Sundays there is one train in each direction, Limerick-Ballybrophy. Services on the line are formed of IE 2800 Class (diesel) railcars.

This service is an improvement over previous timetables. The North Tipperary Community Rail Partnership lobbied Irish Rail to improve the timetable to suit commuters, which they duly did, to a limited extent. The service is mostly patronised by passengers who connect into morning Limerick to Heuston Station trains and evening trains in the opposite direction, at Ballybrophy Station.

The railway line has several speed restrictions, particularly close to Limerick city. Although the line offers a geographically shorter and more direct route between Limerick and Dublin, it takes almost an hour longer than travelling from Limerick to Dublin via Limerick Junction. The train is slower than travelling by car between Nenagh and Limerick. The railway line does not serve major employment and educational facilities in Limerick such as the National Technology Park and the University of Limerick which are located near the line.

== Proposed developments ==
In November 2016 it was announced the line was very likely to close in 2018 as the demand for the service was low and CIE/IE wished to close it to save money. This was subsequently ruled out by Iarnród Éireann.

In 2021, the North Tipperary Community Rail Partnership issued online petitions to improve the Limerick–Ballybrophy railway line service. There is a phased continuous welded rail (CWR) track relay project being carried out on the line over the last few years. There is currently approximately 12 miles of the old jointed track left to be replaced with CWR in the relay project. The majority of the remaining jointed track yet to be relaid is between Cloughjordan and Roscrea stations. The North Tipperary Community Rail Partnership hopes that, once the CWR relay project is completed, signalling system on the Limerick–Ballybrophy railway line will then be upgraded to help improve the speed limits imposed on trains travelling on the line. As of October 2024 there is no longer any jointed track left on the line.

In 2022 the North Tipperary Community Rail Partnership conducted a survey of users and potential users of the line which called for increased frequency of the service and other recommendations.

In 2024, Iarnród Éireann commenced a study with AtkinsRéalis for a possible new station at Ballysimon to serve UL, Castletroy and its environs.
