= Cloughjordan railway station =

Station in County Tipperary, Ireland

Cloughjordan Cloch Shiurdáin
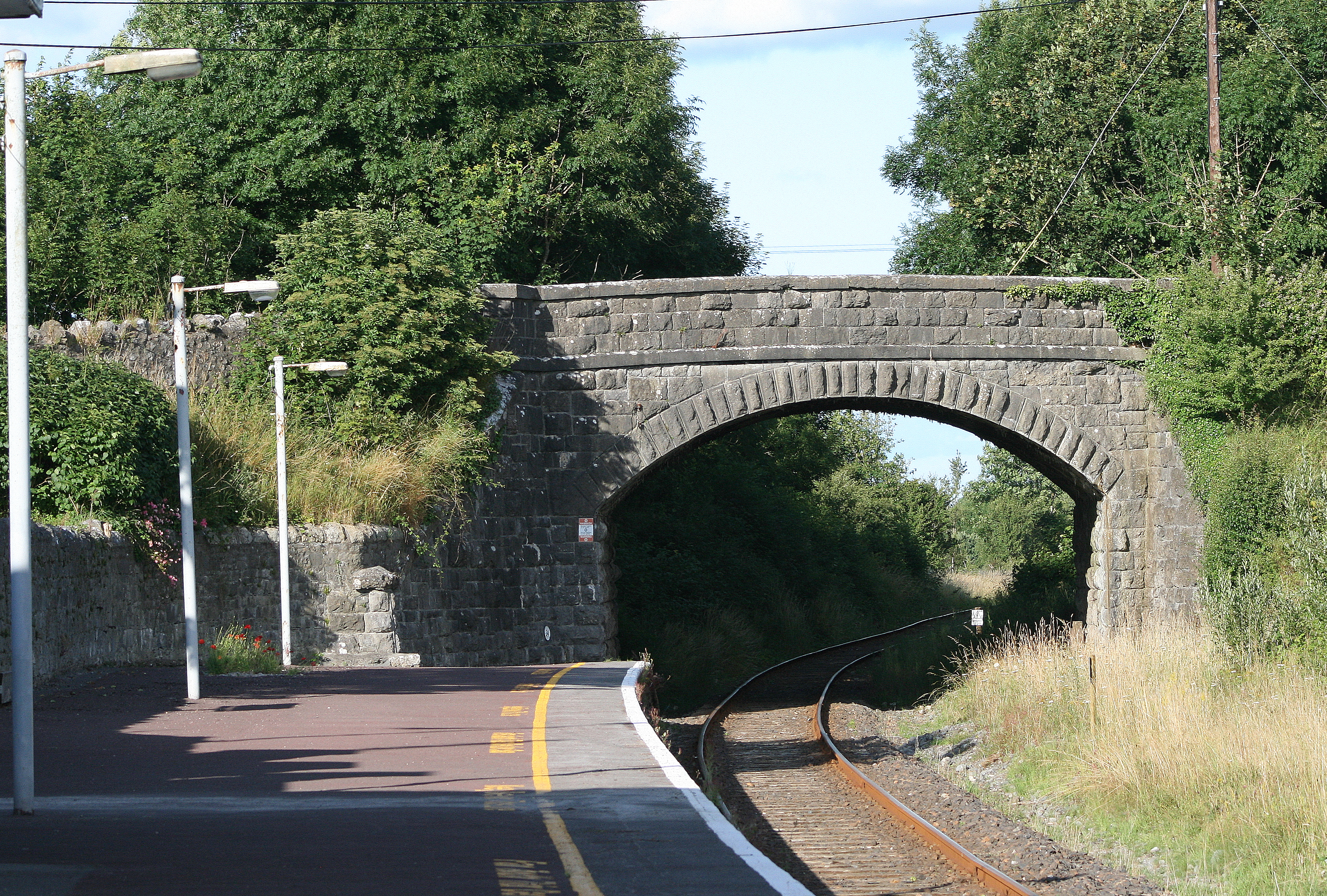
- Limerick–Ballybrophy line passing under the R490 road at Cloughjordan station

General information
- Location: Cloughjordan; Ireland
- Coordinates: 52°56′10″N 8°1′27″W
- Owner: Iarnród Éireann
- Operator: Iarnród Éireann
- Platforms: 1

Construction
- Structure type: At-grade
Location

Cloughjordan railway station serves the town and surrounding area of Cloughjordan, County Tipperary in the Midwest of Ireland. The station is located 1 km southwest of the town centre on the Templemore Road.

Cloughjordan railway station opened to the public on 5 October 1863 and is on the Limerick-Ballybrophy railway line, located between Nenagh railway station and Roscrea railway station. Passengers can connect at Ballybrophy to trains heading northeast to Dublin or southwest to Cork or Tralee.

The station is unstaffed and has a car park. A partnership between the local Tidy Towns group and Irish Rail has seen several improvements to the station and its surroundings.

== Buildings ==
The station façade, signal cabin, platform, entrance piers and gates are listed as protected structures by Tipperary County Council (RPS Ref S457). The National Inventory of Architectural Heritage lists the station building and station masters house as being of architectural and social interest, while the five bay goods shed and road bridge which carries the R490 over the railway being listed as of architectural and technical interest. Up until 1977, when the signal cabin closed, there was passing loop, where trains could cross at the station.

== Services ==
As of 2021, services were as follows:

Mon - Sat

- 2 trains to Limerick Colbert (2 trains Mon - Fri)
- 2 trains to Ballybrophy

Sundays

- 1 train to Limerick Colbert
- 1 train to Ballybrophy

== Proposed developments ==
In November 2016 it was announced the line was very likely to close in 2018 due to low demand, and CIE/IE wished to close it to save money. This was subsequently ruled out by Irish Rail (Iarnród Éireann).

The North Tipperary Community Rail Partnership have long campaigned to improve the Limerick–Ballybrophy railway line service.

There is a phased continuous welded rail (CWR) track relay project being carried out on the line over the last few years. The majority of the remaining jointed track, yet to be relayed, is between Cloughjordan and Roscrea stations.

On 1 November 2021 the line closed for 5 weeks to allow up to 3.5 miles of old jointed track to be relaid with modern CWR.

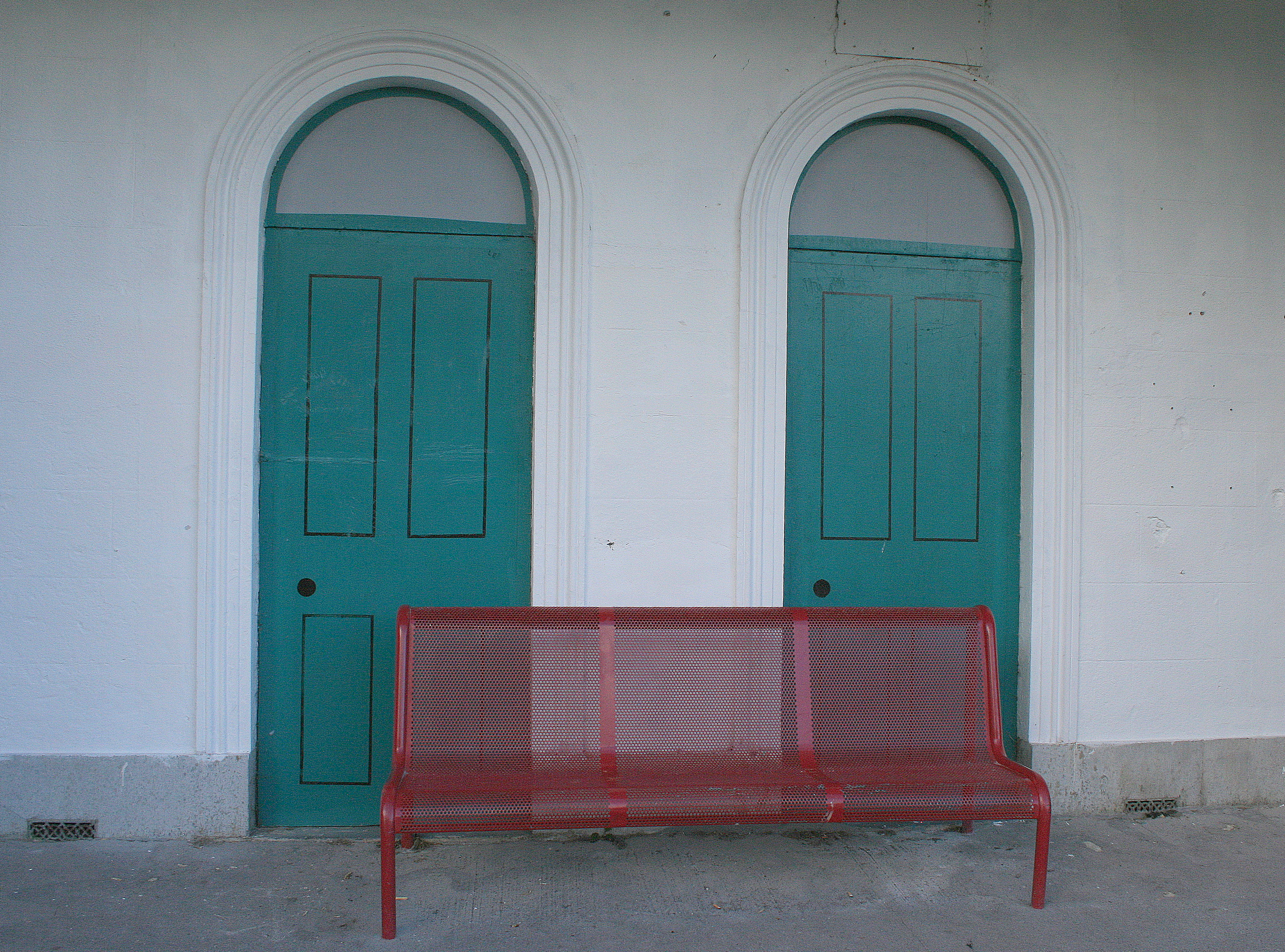
Bench at the station

== See also ==
- List of railway stations in Ireland

Preceding station	Iarnród Éireann	Following station
Nenagh	Commuter; Limerick-Ballybrophy	Roscrea
