= Book of Dimma =

8th century Irish manuscript

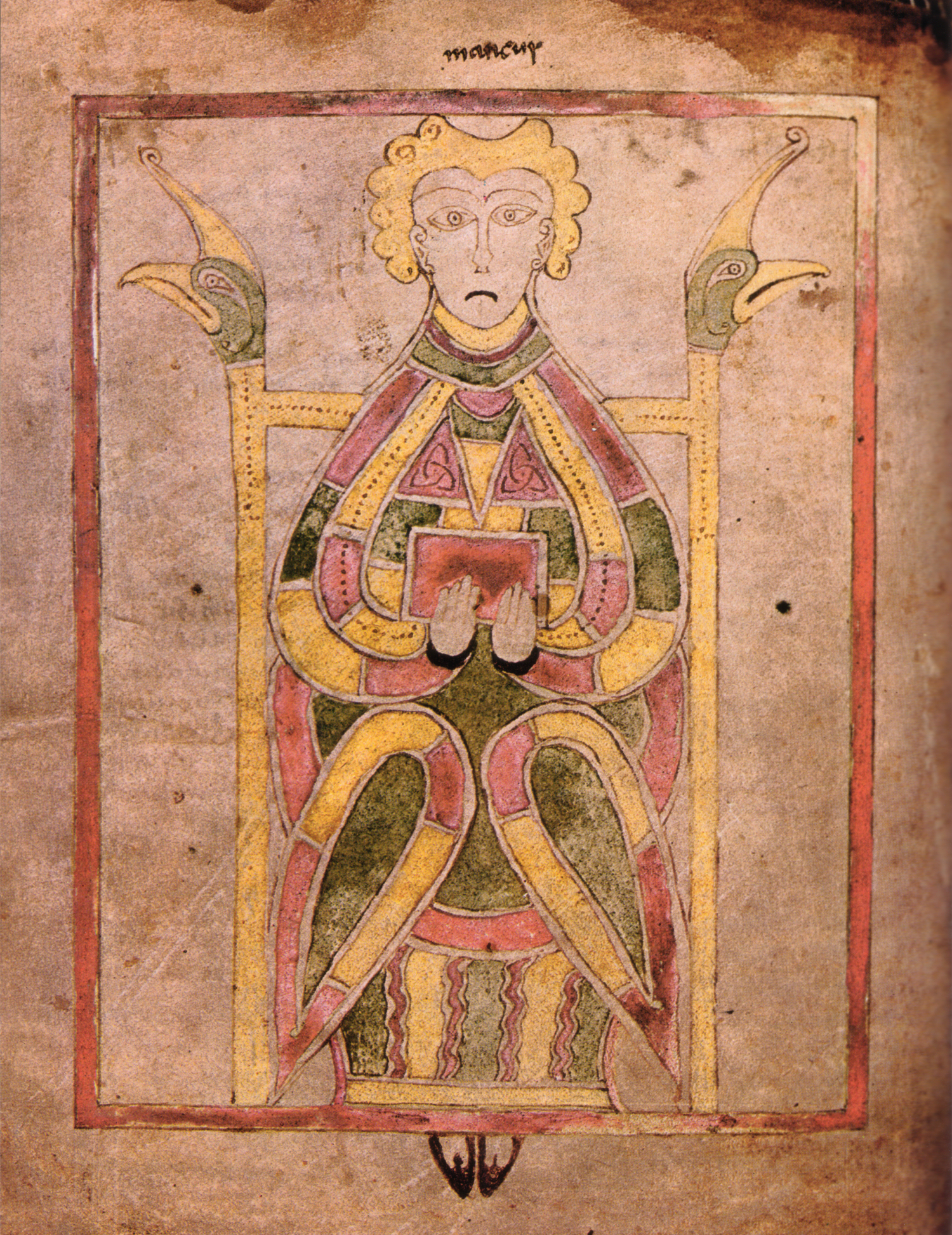
Evangelist portrait

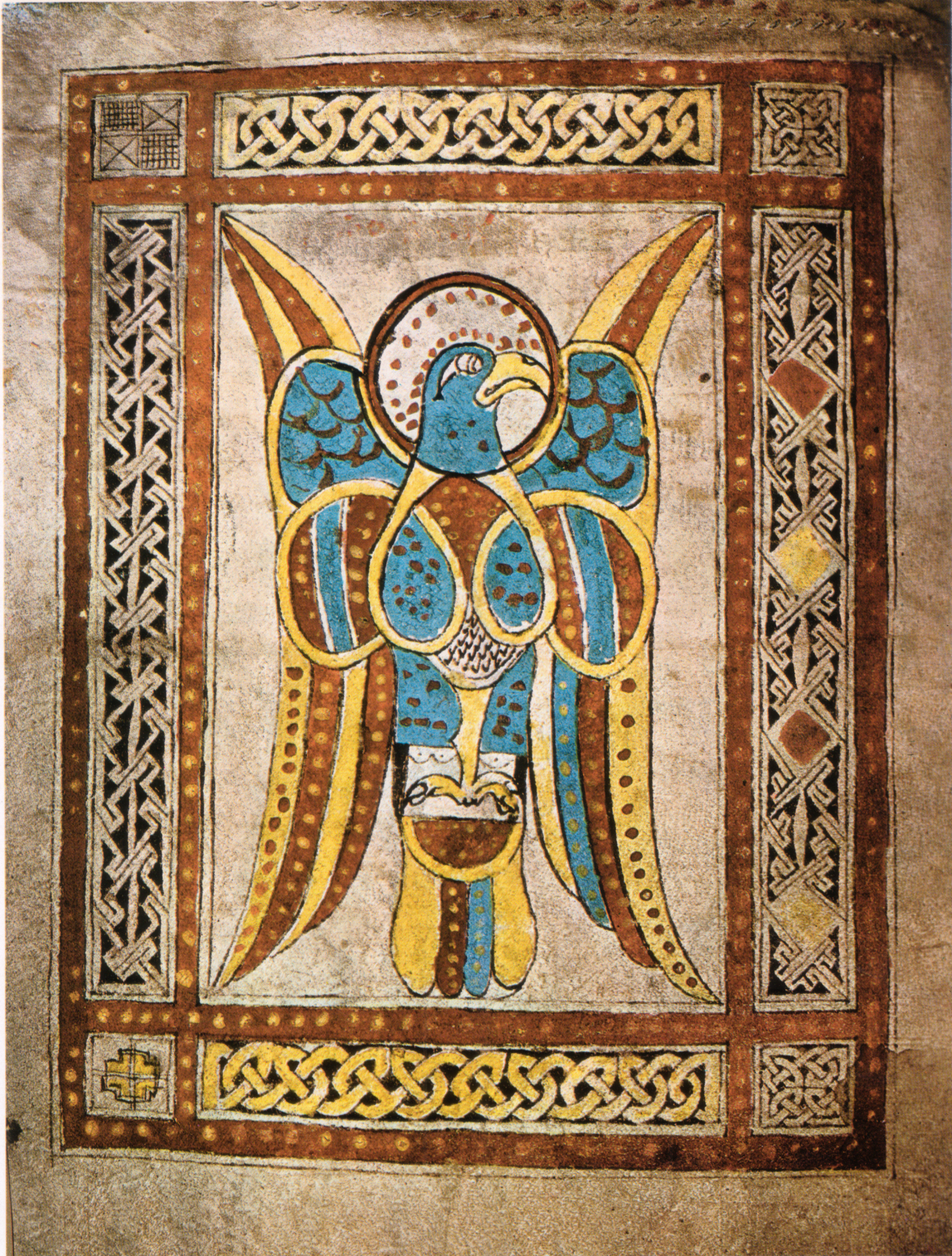
St. John

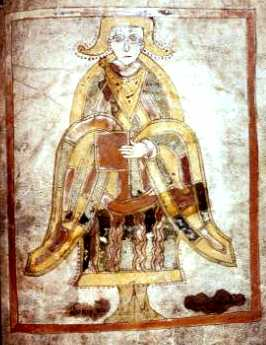
St. Matthew

The Book of Dimma (Dublin, Trinity College, MS.A.IV.23) is an 8th-century Irish pocket Gospel Book originally from the Abbey of Roscrea, founded by St. Crónán in County Tipperary, Ireland. In addition to the Gospels of Luke and John, it has an order for the Unction and Communion of the Sick. The surviving illumination of the manuscript contains a number of illuminated initials, three Evangelist portrait pages, and one page with an Evangelist's symbol (the eagle of St. John). The pocket gospel book is a distinctively Insular format, of which the Stowe Missal and Book of Mulling are other leading examples.

The gospels other than John are "written for the most part in a rapid cursive script", while John is "by a different scribe, in neat minuscule bookhand". It was signed by its scribe, Dimma MacNathi, at the end of each of the Gospels. This Dimma has been traditionally identified with a bishop who was later Bishop of Connor, mentioned by Pope John IV in a letter on Pelagianism in 640. This identification, however, cannot be sustained.

== History ==
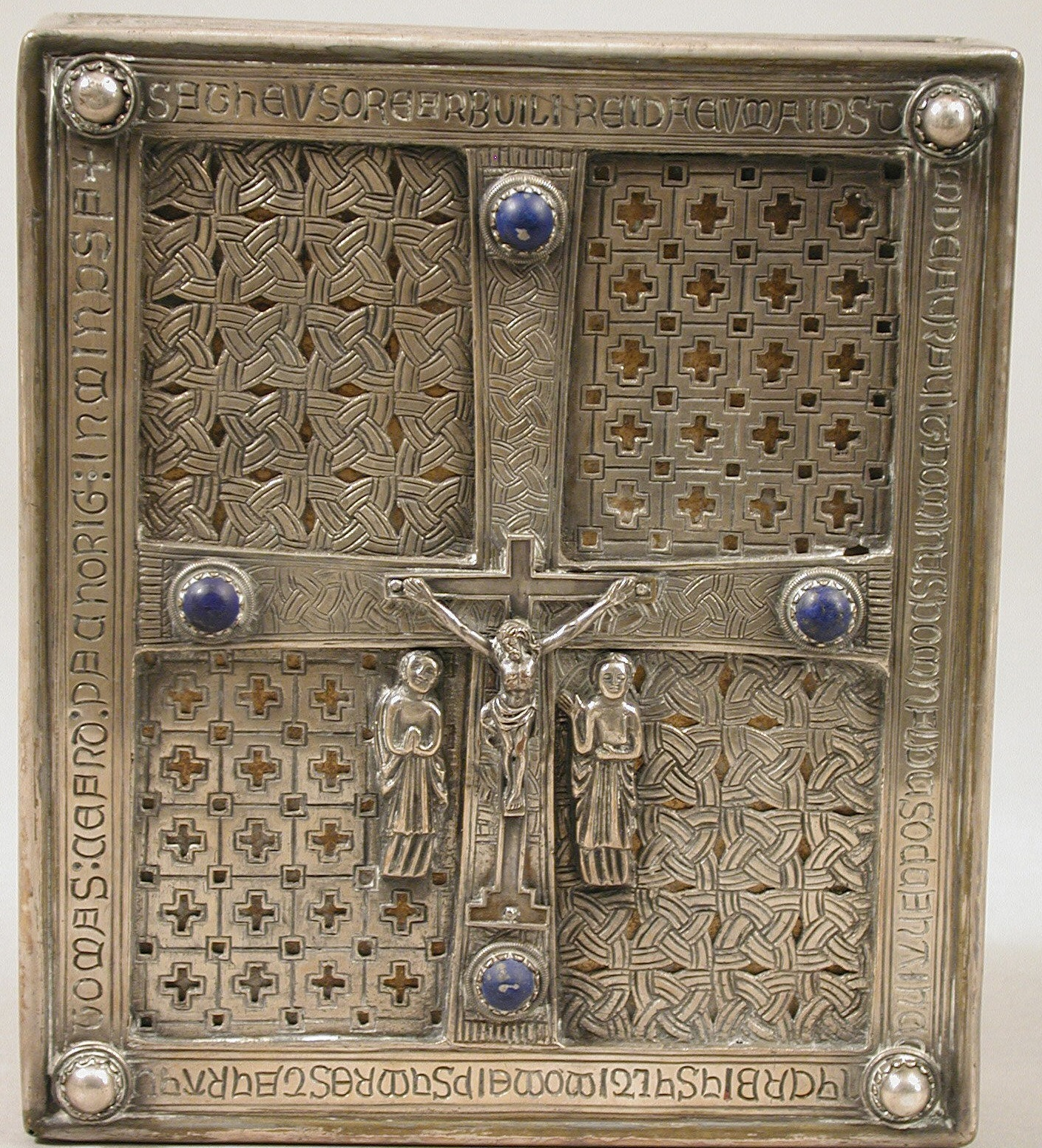
Cumdach of the Book of Dimma, 20th-century reproduction of front

A well-known legend relates that Crónán asked a monk named Dimma to copy the book, but that it had to be done in one day. Dimma set to work on this impossible task and copied continuously without a break for any meals. All the while he worked the sun never set. When Dimma finished, he thought that it had only taken him one day, when in reality it had taken forty. This miracle was attributed to Crónán.

== Cumdach (book-shrine) ==
In the 12th century, the manuscript was encased in a richly worked cumdach or reliquary case, which remains with it at Trinity. On one face it has panels of openwork decoration in Viking Ringerike style over the wood case. There is a good reproduction from 1908 in the Metropolitan Museum of Art in New York, which, although not on display there, has good illustrations available online, unlike the original piece.

== Provenance ==
Among the later owners, it belonged to William Meagher, a Catholic priest in Roscrea, then to his descendant Philip Meagher, a priest in Nenagh. Meagher lent it to Dr Thomas Harrison, who sold it without permission to Henry Monck Mason, a librarian at the King's Inns society in Dublin, sometime before 1816. He was presented to the Royal Irish Academy on 24 May 1819. It was purchased by Sir William Betham before 1826 and he himself attempted to auction it on 4 July 1830. He finally ceded the manuscript to Trinity College on 29 March 1836.

== Sources ==
- Moss, Rachel. Medieval c. 400—c. 1600: Art and Architecture of Ireland. New Haven, CT: Yale University Press, 2014. ISBN 978-03-001-7919-4
- Moss, Rachel. The Book of Durrow. Dublin Trinity College Library; Thames and Hudson, 2018. ISBN 978-0-5002-9460-4
- O'Neill, Timothy. The Irish Hand: Scribes and Their Manuscripts From the Earliest Times. Cork: Cork University Press, 2014. ISBN 978-1-7820-5092-6
