= St. Cronan's Church, Roscrea (Roman Catholic) =

Irish Roman Catholic church

St. Cronan's Church is a 19th-century Roman Catholic church in Roscrea, County Tipperary, Ireland.
