= Ballybrophy railway station =

Station in County Laois, Ireland

Ballybrophy Baile Uí Bhróithe
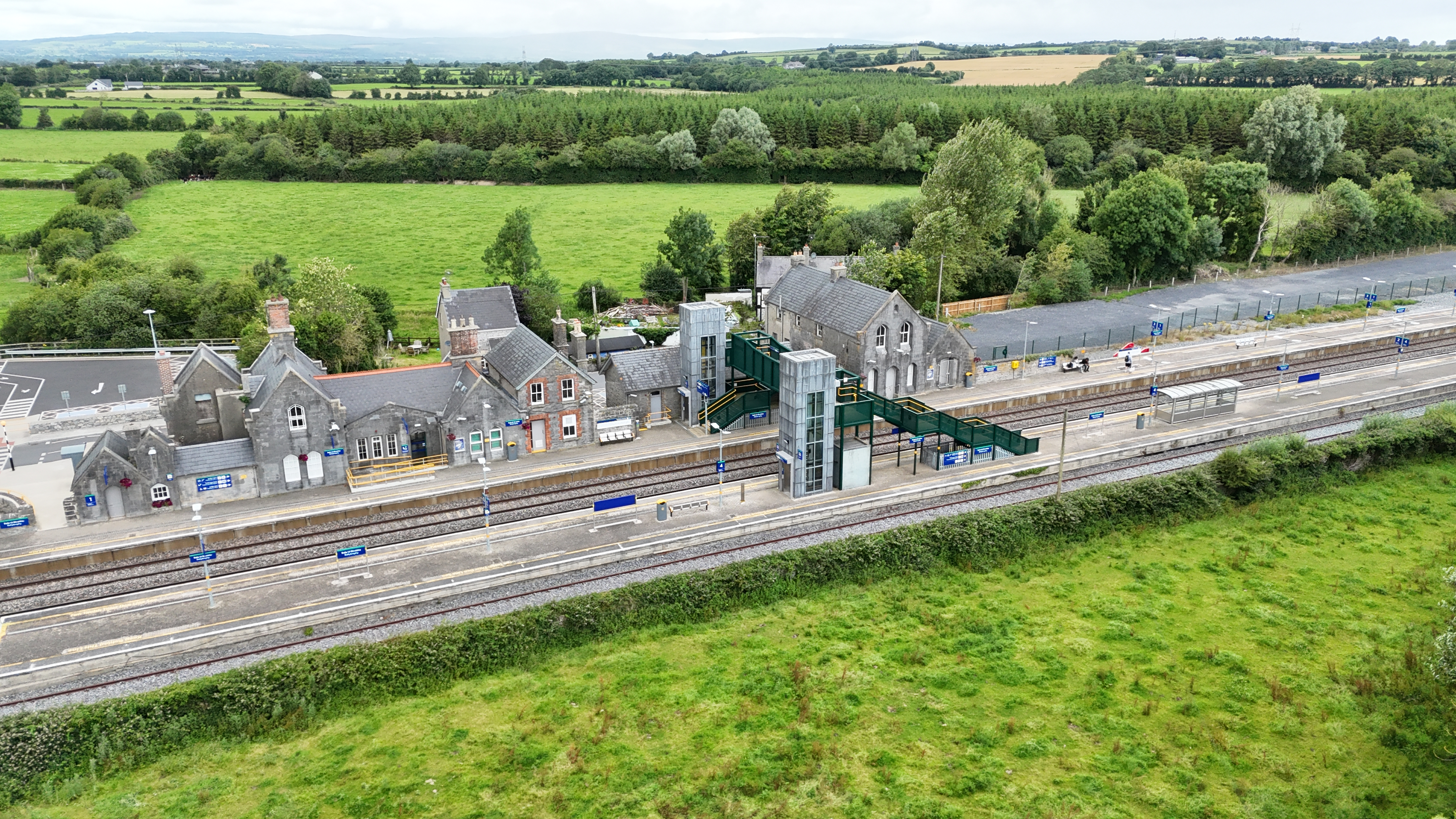
- Ballybrophy Station

General information
- Other names: Heavens Entrance
- Location: Station Road, Ballybrophy; County Laois, R32 DW66; Ireland
- Coordinates: 52°53′58″N 7°36′9″W
- Owner: Iarnród Éireann
- Operator: Iarnród Éireann
- Platforms: 4
- Bus operators: TFI Local Link
- Connections: 854

Construction
- Structure type: At-grade

History
- Opened: 1847

Services
Preceding station	Iarnród Éireann	Following station
Portlaoise	InterCity; Dublin-Cork Main Line	Thurles
Portlaoise	InterCity; Dublin-Limerick	Templemore
Roscrea	Commuter; Limerick-Ballybrophy	Terminus
Location

Ballybrophy is a railway station in the village of Ballybrophy, County Laois, Ireland, halfway between Borris-in-Ossory and Rathdowney in the Barony of Clandonagh.

The station is an exchange point for passengers on Dublin to Cork services to connect to Limerick via Nenagh services.

== Station name ==
The station opened on 1 September 1847 as Roscrea & Borris. It was later renamed Roscrea & Parsonstown Junction in 1858, and renamed again in 1871 as Ballybrophy.

== Facilities ==
Lifts were fitted to the footbridge in late 2007. Therefore, disabled passengers who cannot use steps and are boarding or alighting from trains to Cork and Limerick via Limerick Junction are no longer required to cross the tracks at ground level, as was previously the case. This was only possible when trains were clear of the tracks.

== Proposed developments ==
Ballybrophy's railway station is a connection point between the main Dublin-Cork main line and the Limerick–Ballybrophy railway line. The branch line is lightly travelled, as the principal route between Dublin and Limerick is via Limerick Junction. Since the introduction of a two-hourly Dublin-Limerick service in 2008, this journey does not usually require a change of train.

Up until the mid-1980s the line to Limerick via Nenagh diverged from the mainline via a junction that faced Cork. This was replaced by a siding connection when the mainline was resignalled. For trains to enter the Nenagh branch from the Dublin bound mainline requires trains to set back into the bay platform before proceeding to Nenagh and Limerick. A train travelling from Dublin to Limerick via Nenagh would need to set back from the Down mainline onto the Up mainline before pulling forward into the bay platform. Prior to 1967, the only route from Dublin to Limerick that did not entail a reversal was via Athenry and the former Sligo to Limerick line of the Waterford, Limerick and Western Railway.

Some of those who favour retaining the line have theorised that replacing the south facing connection at Ballybrophy with a new line east to the more populated Borris-in-Ossory, and joining the line nearer Portlaoise would be better for Dublin connections. However, in addition to the substantial capital cost of this work, substantial parts of the line would still need to be re-laid nearer Limerick to eliminate severe speed restrictions. The M7 motorway from Dublin to Limerick also dissuades rail usage.

=== Proposed closure ===
In November 2016 it was announced the line was very likely to close in 2018 as the demand for the service was low and CIE/IE wished to close it to save money. This was subsequently ruled out by Irish Rail (Iarnród Éireann).

=== Petitioned upgrades ===
The North Tipperary Community Rail Partnership have campaigned to improve the Limerick–Ballybrophy railway line service, including issuing an online petition. It is hoped that, as soon as an ongoing continuous welded rail (CWR) relay project is completed between Cloughjordan and Roscrea stations, that further improvements such as the signalling system on the Limerick–Ballybrophy railway line will then be upgraded to help improve the speed limits imposed on trains travelling on the line.

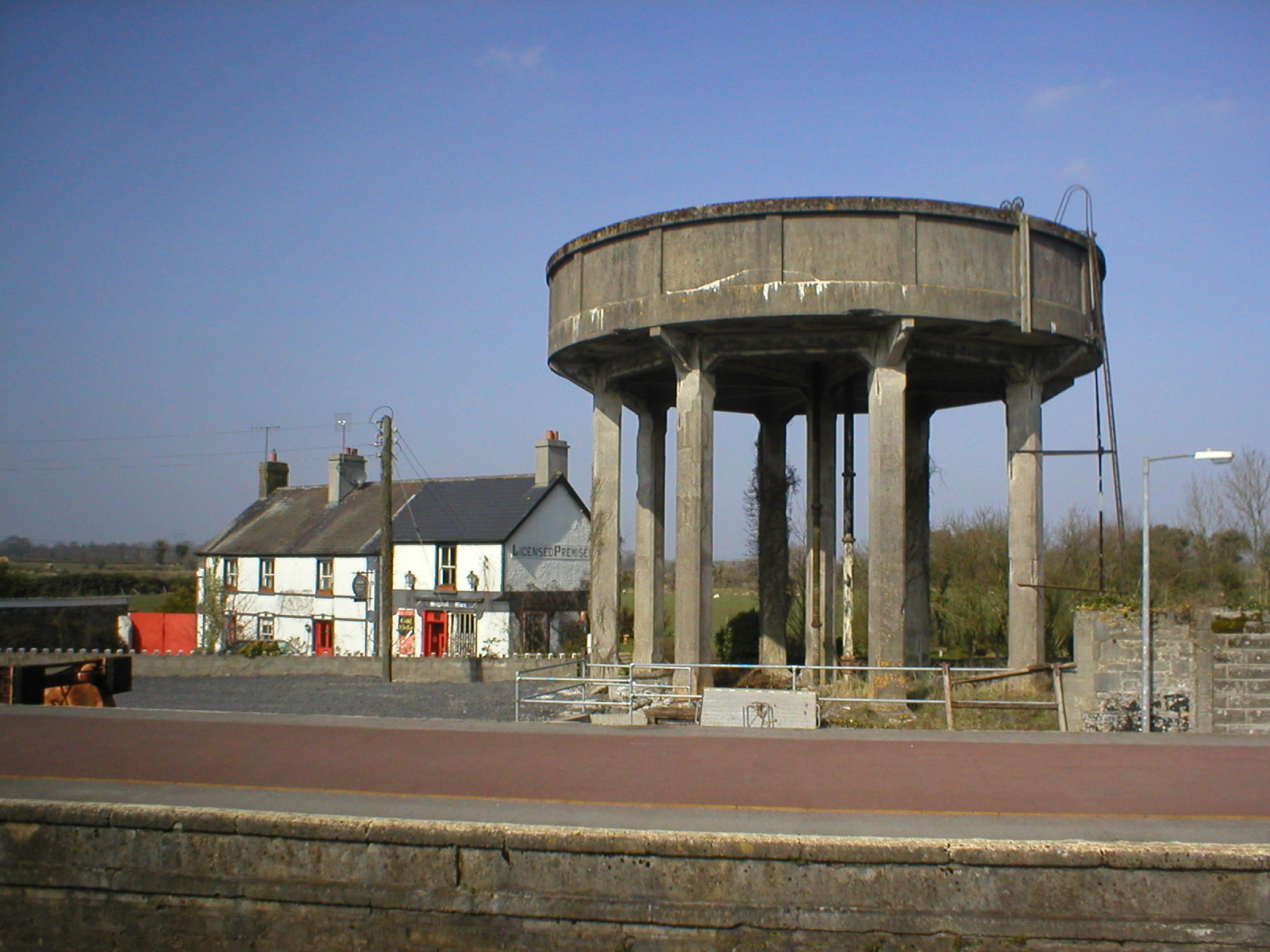
An old water tower, from the days of steam, pictured in 2002

== See also ==
- List of railway stations in Ireland
