= St. Cronan's Church, Roscrea (Church of Ireland) =

St. Cronan's Church
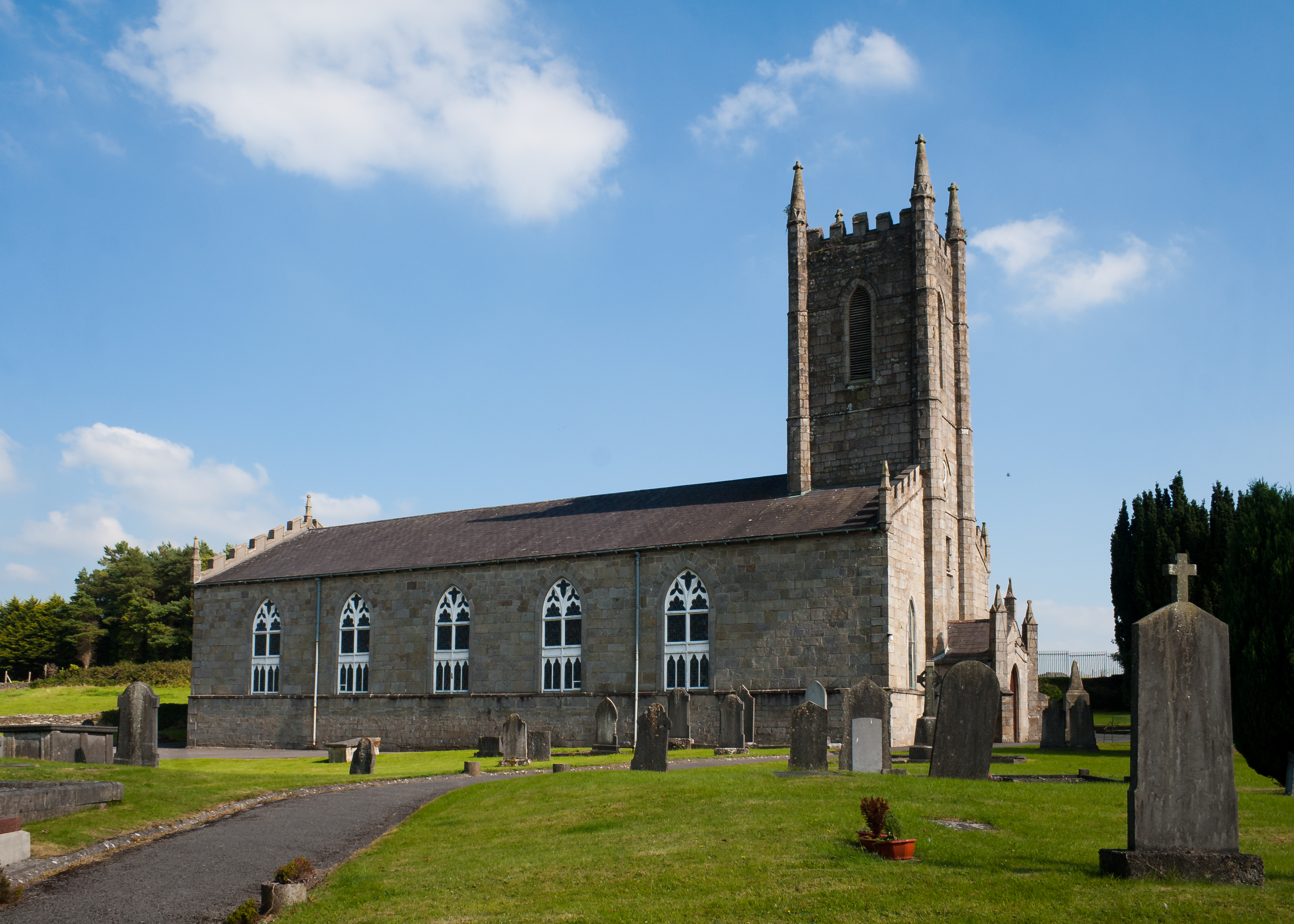
- View of the graveyard, nave, and tower of St. Cronan's Church, Roscrea
- St. Cronan's Church
- 52°57′20″N 07°47′42″W
- Country: Ireland
- Denomination: Church of Ireland
- Previous denomination: Roman Catholic (original 12th century church)

History
- Founded: 1812

Architecture
- Style: Gothic/Romanesque

Administration
- Diocese: Diocese of Limerick and Killaloe

St. Cronan's Church is a 19th-century Church of Ireland church in Roscrea, County Tipperary, Ireland. The church was constructed in 1812 on the site of the original 12th century Romanesque church. The grounds include a graveyard and a replica high cross, enclosed by a rubble stone wall, cast iron gate and railings.

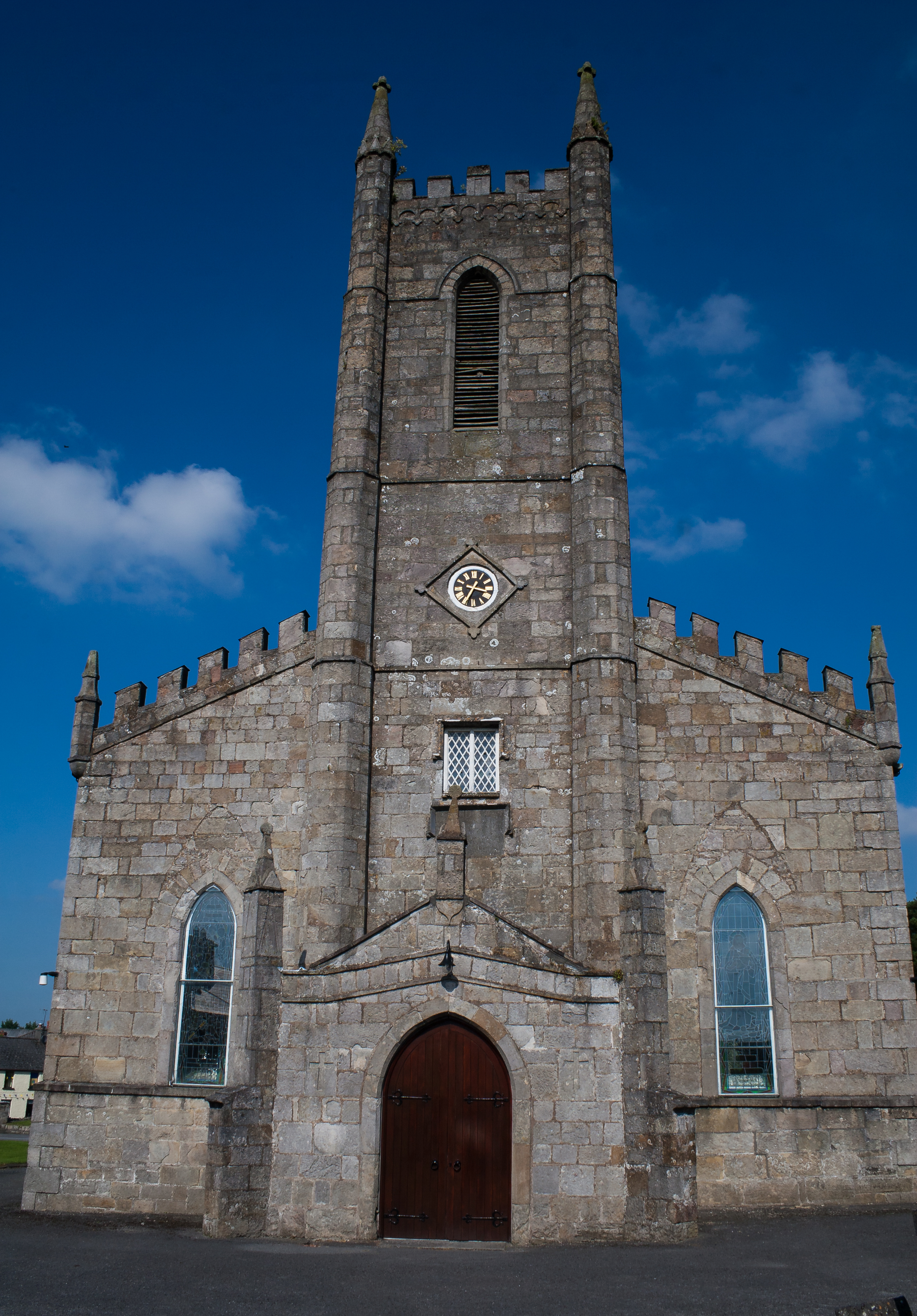
Tower and main entrance of modern church

== Original church ==
The grounds include part of a 12th-century Romanesque church which was demolished in 1812 to make way for the construction of the current church. Only the western gable of the original church remains, including a bell-cot which was added at a later date. Stones and material from the original church were used for the new building. The original church is registered as National Monument number 126.

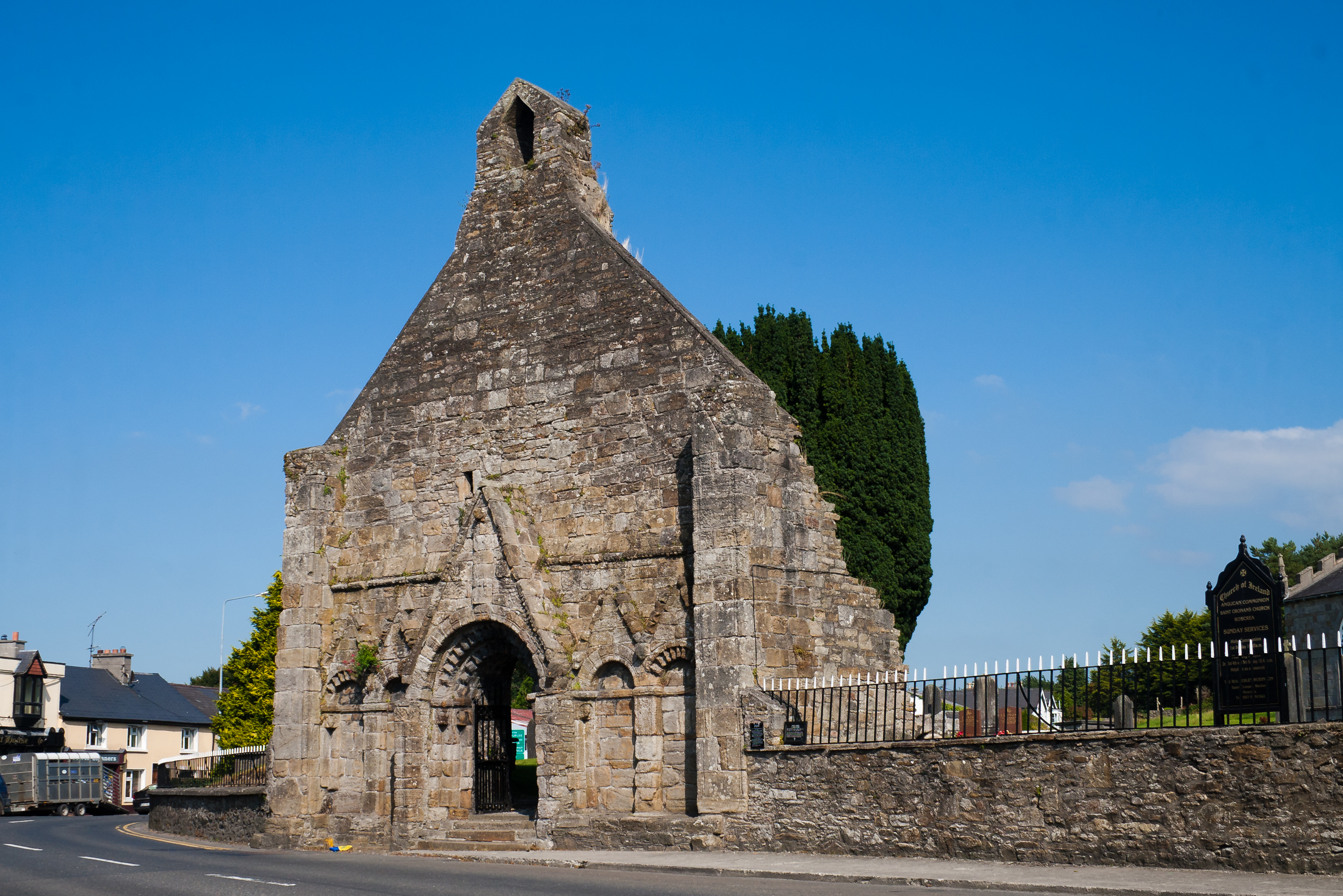
Original 12th century Romanesque St. Cronan's Church

== Current church design ==
The modern church was designed by local architect James Sheane, whose name is inscribed on a datestone in the tower and who was buried in the churchyard upon his death in 1816. A porch was later added by John Bowden. The church was restored in 1879 by Thomas Newenham Deane. The original construction was funded by the Board of First Fruits with a gift of £100 and a loan of £775.

It is a detached, single-cell, gable-fronted church. The pitched roof is covered with artificial slate. There are 5 bays on each side of the nave which features Gothic pointed-arch stained glass windows, with a vestry to the south east, and a porch and 4-stage bell tower to the south west. The string coursed sandstone walls and tower feature crenellation and pinnacles, as well as diagonal buttresses and pinnacles on the porch. The pointed-arch main doorway holds a timber battened double-leaf door.

== Preservation ==
The church has been renovated several times, including a large renovation in the 1960s when the slate roof was replaced, the interior was redecorated, and the graveyard was deforested.

Its most notable historical artefact is a 17th-century pre-Reformation silver chalice decorated with raised angelic figures. The chalice may have been used at a wedding as the letters S.C. M.P., thought to be the initials of the couple, are inscribed on the base.
