= Jack Ryan (Moneygall hurler) =

Irish hurler and Gaelic footballer

Personal information
- Born: 1946 (age 79–80) Dunkerrin, County Offaly, Ireland

Sport
- Sport: Hurling
- Position: Left wing-forward
Club
- Years: Club
- Moneygall
Club titles
- Tipperary titles: 2
Inter-county
- Years: County
- 1968-1977: Tipperary
Inter-county titles
- Munster titles: 1
- All-Irelands: 1
- NHL: 0
- All Stars: 0

Jack Ryan (born 1946) is an Irish former hurler and Gaelic footballer. His championship career as a dual player with the Tipperary senior teams spanned eleven seasons from 1967 until 1977.

Born in Dunkerrin, County Offaly, Ryan was raised in a family that had a strong association with Gaelic games. His father, Séamus Ó Riain, had played junior hurling and football with Tipperary in the 1940s before becoming a Gaelic games administrator. He served in numerous roles with the Tipperary County Board and the Munster Council before becoming President of the Gaelic Athletic Association in 1967. Ryan's brothers - Philip, Séamus and Eugene - would all later play for Tipperary at various levels.

Ryan first played competitive Gaelic football and hurling with the Moneygall club at juvenile and underage levels. After winning several divisional titles in both codes, Ryan won back-to-back county senior championship medals in 1975 and 1976.

Ryan made his debut on the inter-county scene at the age of sixteen when he was selected for the Tipperary minor hurling team in 1963. He enjoyed two championship seasons with the minor team, however, he was a Munster runner-up on both occasions. After a year with the Tipperary junior football team, Ryan spent three years as a dual player with the under-21 teams, culminating with the winning of an All-Ireland medal in 1967. That same year he was added to the Tipperary senior football panel before joining the senior hurling panel the following year. Over the course of the next decade Ryan was a regular player with the hurlers, and he won All-Ireland and Munster medals as a non-playing substitute in 1971. He retired from inter-county hurling following the conclusion of the 1977 championship.

Ryan's wife, Orla Ní Síocháin, was a three-time All-Ireland medal winner with the Dublin camogie team and a daughter of GAA General-Secretary Seán Ó Síocháin, while his son, Shane Ryan, was a six-time Leinster medal winner with the Dublin senior football team.

== Honours ==
Moneygall

- Tipperary Senior Hurling Championship (2): 1975, 1976

Tipperary

- All-Ireland Senior Hurling Championship (1): 1971
- Munster Senior Hurling Championship (1): 1971
- All-Ireland Under-21 Hurling Championship (1): 1967
- Munster Under-21 Hurling Championship (2): 1965, 1967
