= Philip Ryan =

Philip Ryan may refer to:

- Philip Ryan (dual player) (born 1944), Irish hurler and Gaelic footballer
- Philip Ryan (priest), Irish Anglican priest
- Philip Ryan (Gaelic footballer), Gaelic footballer for St Brigid's

== See also ==
- Phillip Ryan, a character from the TV series Waterloo Road
