= Pat McDonagh (businessman) =

Irish businessman

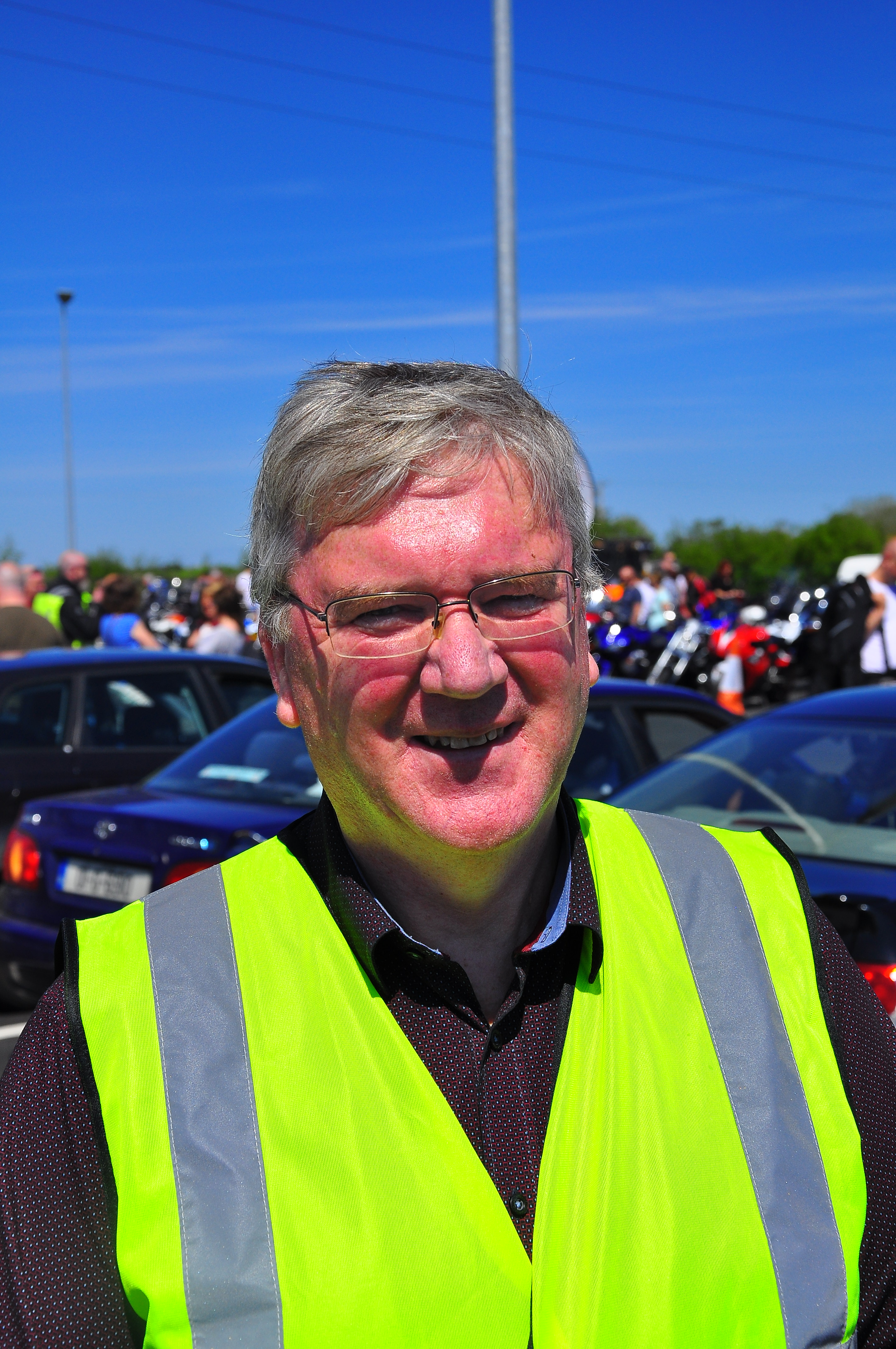
- McDonagh in 2016
- Born: 1952 or 1953; Galway, Ireland
- Education: Carmelite College; Mary Immaculate College
- Occupation: Businessman
- Years active: 1978–present
- Known for: Founder of Supermac's, Só Hotels and the Plaza Group
- Spouse: Una McDonagh

Patrick McDonagh (born 1952 or 1953) is an Irish businessman, best known as the founder and owner of Supermac's, an Irish fast food franchiser. Originally working as a school teacher, he later became a multi-millionaire.

== Personal life ==
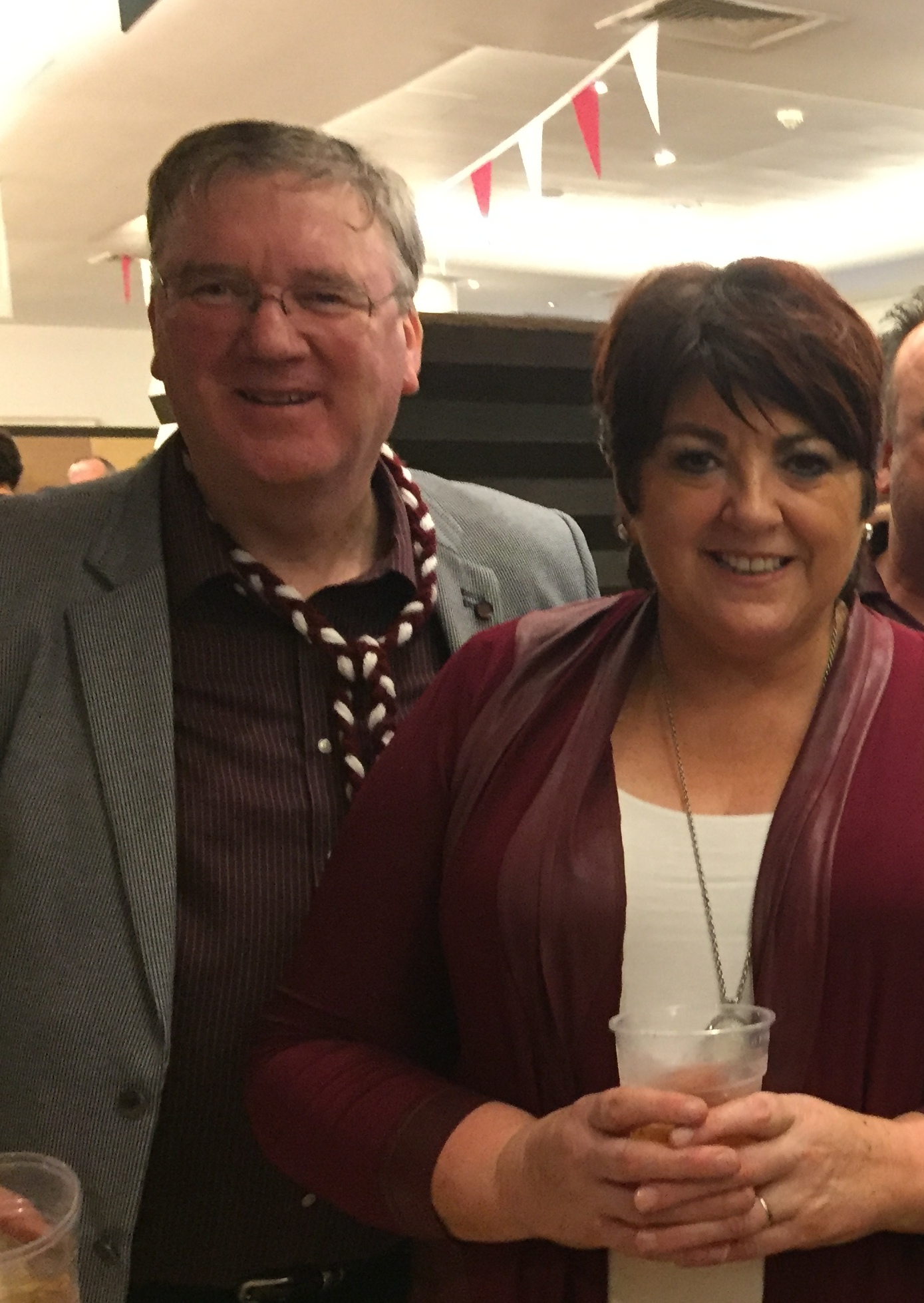
Pat and his wife Una in 2017

McDonagh is a native of County Galway, where he lives with his wife Una. He was educated at Carmelite College, Moate, County Westmeath, and Mary Immaculate College, Limerick. Trained as a teacher, he worked for a time as a teacher (and later principal) in a national school near Loughrea, County Galway.

He earned the nickname "Supermac" whilst playing Gaelic football for the Carmelite College in Moate. This then became the choice of name for his business, "Supermac's". McDonagh has an interest in sport, and his company has sponsored several sports teams, including sponsoring Galway's football and hurling teams for several decades.

== Business ventures ==
McDonagh founded Supermac's in Ballinasloe, County Galway, Ireland in 1978 after failing to get planning permission to build a pool hall. He expanded the franchise to over 100 stores across Ireland.

He also owns other business ventures in the food and hospitality industry. Among these are the Claddagh Irish Pubs, an Irish pub-themed chain in the United States, founded in 2001. In 2006 McDonagh bought the franchise rights for Papa John's Pizza in Ireland. As of 2019, there were over 63 Papa John's Pizza outlets throughout the country. In 2014, he established SuperSubs salad and sandwich bars which operate from some Supermac's outlets.

McDonagh's other ventures include travel plazas and service stations across Ireland, including the Barack Obama Plaza off the M7. He also owns the Killeshin Hotel, Portlaoise and the Charleville Park Hotel, Cork which he purchased after the development of the Loughrea Hotel & Spa, Galway and the Castletroy Park Hotel, Limerick which were bought in 2014 and 2012 respectively. In 2018 he purchased the Athlone Springs hotel.
