= M7 motorway (Ireland) =

Motorway in Ireland

M7 motorway
- Mótarbhealach M7
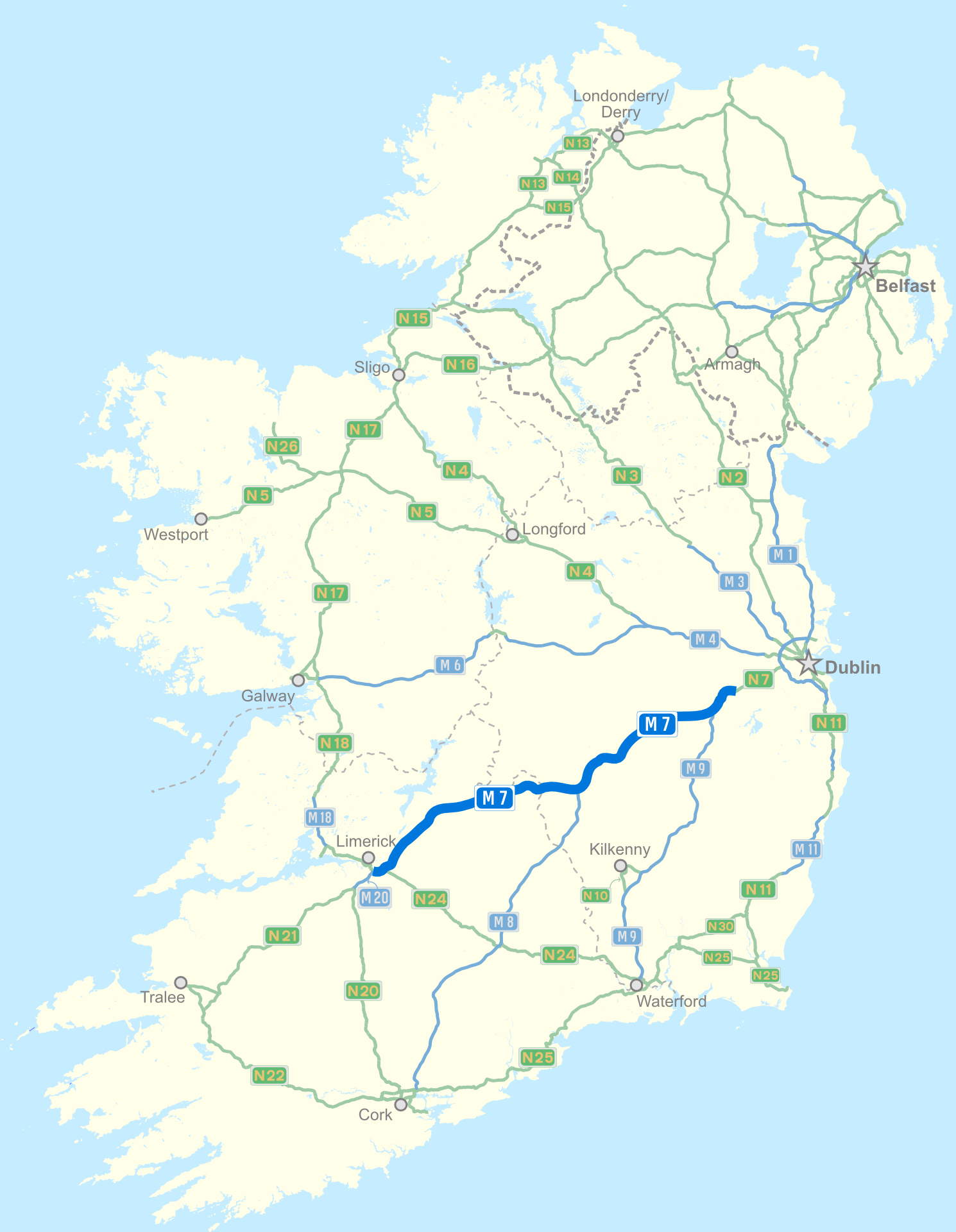
- Clickable image

Route information
- Part of E20
- Length: 166.5 km (103.5 mi)
- Existed: 1983–present
- History: Completed 1983–2010; Stages: Naas bypass, J9-J10: 1983; Newbridge Bypass, J11-J12: 1993; Portlaoise bypass: 1997; Kildare bypass: 2003; Monasterevin bypass: 2004; Limerick Southern Ring Road - Phase I: 2004; Portlaoise to Borris-in-Ossory, Nenagh to Limerick, Castletown to Nenagh: 2010; M7 Road widening scheme 2017-2020

Major junctions
- Northeast end: (N7 from Dublin) Naas
- J11 → M9 motorway J16 → N80 road J17 → N77 road J19 → M8 motorway J22 → N62 road J26 → N52 road J29 → N24 road J30 → M20 motorway, N18 road
- Southwest end: Rossbrien Interchange - Limerick

Location
- Country: Ireland
- Primary destinations: Naas, Newbridge (M9 to Waterford), Monasterevin, Portlaoise (M8 to Cork), Mountrath, Borris-in-Ossory, Roscrea, Moneygall, Toomevara, Nenagh, Limerick (N18 to Ennis & Shannon Airport, M20 to Cork/Kerry)

Highway system
- Roads in Ireland; Motorways; Primary; Secondary; Regional

The M7 motorway (Irish: Mótarbhealach M7) is a motorway in Ireland. The motorway runs continuously from the outskirts of Naas in County Kildare to Rossbrien on the outskirts of Limerick city. The M7 forms part of the Dublin to Limerick N7 national primary road. The section of the motorway bypassing Naas, an 8 km stretch, was the first section of motorway to open in Ireland, in 1983. Following substantial works to extend the M7 to Limerick, by the end of 2010, the motorway replaced all of the old single-carriageway N7 route which is now designated as R445. At 166.5 km, the M7 is the longest motorway in Ireland.

== Route ==
=== Naas to Limerick ===
The N7 leads directly into the M7 motorway at the Maudlin's Interchange near Naas (junction 9 on the N7-M7 corridor), and proceeds southwestwards, bypassing Naas, Newbridge, Kildare, Monasterevin, Ballybrittas, Portlaoise, Mountrath, Borris-in-Ossory, Roscrea, Moneygall, Toomevara, Nenagh and Annacotty. As of December 2010, the M7 is approximately 186 km in length and ends at the Rosbrien interchange (junction 30) outside Limerick. Here, the road connects to the Limerick Southern Ring Road - Phase 2 and continues as the N18. At junction 30 there is also a slip-road to the M20 Limerick - Cork/Kerry road. Along this section of the M7 there is a fly-over for the N24 Limerick to Waterford road at junction 29. Southwest of Portlaoise it forms an interchange with the M8 Dublin-Cork motorway at junction 19 and at junction 11 there is an interchange with the M9 Dublin - Waterford motorway. (From this junction the M7/N7 is 3 lanes in each direction until it intersects with the M50 (Dublin's ring-motorway))

== History ==
The M7 was constructed in stages between 1983 and 2010 to replace the old national route which ran (in order from east to west) through the villages and towns of Naas (1983), Newbridge (1993), Kildare (December 2003), Monasterevin (November 2004), Portlaoise (29 May 1997), Mountrath and Borris-in-Ossory (both 28 May 2010), Roscrea, Moneygall and Toomevara (all 22 December 2010), Nenagh (single carriageway, original bypass, July 2000) and Birdhill (28 September 2010) and the city of Limerick (May 2004). Today, junctions provide access to all of these places. The old route has been re-classified as a regional road, the R445. A restricted-access fork junction (junction 11) connects the M7 to the M9 motorway to Waterford and Kilkenny also allowing access from the M9 to eastbound carriageway of the M7. The M8 for Cork and parts of Tipperary South such as Cahir, Cashel and Thurles branches at yet another fork junction.

The Kildare bypass, which was completed in 2003, overcame noteworthy environmental and engineering challenges. To allow the bypass to cut through 3.5 km of a major aquifer, an impermeable layer made up of a Bituminous geomembrane and compacted clay was installed underneath the road. This layer created a tanked system in which the road level is below the groundwater level, thereby minimizing the impact to the environmentally sensitive Pollardstown Fen.

Until summer 2006, junction numbers started at seven, although only the first five junctions were numbered. This junction numbering scheme was devised when it was believed that a motorway would be built from Naas to the yet-to-be-constructed junction 8 on the M50. While a motorway reservation still exists, it is now unlikely to be built, having been superseded by the widening of the N7 between Newlands Cross and Naas to three lanes and the grade separation of this section. The junction numbers were renumbered to fit into this scheme in July–August 2006.

The construction of the Nenagh to Limerick section was slow and difficult. Work on this section began on 7 December 2006 and was initially due to be completed in May 2009. The total length of the scheme is 38 km (24 mi), of which 10 km (6.2 mi) was the upgrading of the single carriageway Nenagh bypass. The road opened in three stages. The Nenagh bypass re-opened to motorway standard on 17 December 2009 and the Nenagh to Birdhill section opened on 1 April 2010. Problems were encountered while constructing the road over two sections of deep bog at Annaholty and Drominboy near Birdhill and this delayed the opening of the Birdhill to Limerick section by over a year. Parts of the road collapsed over the two bogs and the sections were rebuilt and opened on 28 September 2010. This scheme was originally to be built as a high-quality dual carriageway (HQDC), but it was re-designated motorway by Statutory Instrument on 17 July 2008.

In June 2007, construction commenced on a 28 km (17 mi) section of the M7 motorway between Portlaoise and Castletown, which opened on 28 May 2010 and is subject to a toll north of the M7-M8 interchange. This M7 scheme runs between junctions 18 and 21 on the N7-M7 corridor and bypasses Borris-in-Ossory and Mountrath. This section includes a tie-in to the new 143 km M8.

In March 2008, construction commenced on a 36 km section (22 miles) of the M7 route between Castletown, County Laois and Nenagh, tying into the Portlaoise-Castletown scheme mentioned above at the Borris-in-Ossory junction. It runs between junctions 21 and 24 on the N7-M7 corridor. This scheme was originally planned to proceed as a High Quality Dual Carriageway (HQDC), which would have seen it built to many of the same engineering standard as a motorway, with a design speed of 120 km/h, however a Statutory Instrument was passed on 17 July 2008, re-designating this and many other new HQDC schemes as motorway. Consequently, when this scheme was complete, it opened with full motorway regulations on 22 December 2010.

In May 2004 work was completed on phase 1 of the Limerick Southern Ring Road which consists of approximately 10 km (6.2 mi) of dual carriageway, and joins the M20 road to Cork and the N21 road to Kerry. Two grade separated junctions allow access to Limerick city at Annacotty via the R445 and at Ballysimon via the N24. The N20 Carew park link road was closed permanently to inbound traffic from both the M7 and M20 in June 2010 to facilitate phase 2 of the Limerick southern ring road project. The dual carriageway was redesignated as M7 in 2009. Phase 2 of the Limerick Southern Ring Road opened as part of the N18 and was completed in July 2010.

In 2017 work started on the widening of 13.5 km of the former two-lane dual carriageway to D3M standard between the Maudlin's interchange (J9) and the M7/M9 junction (J11). The widening project included the relocation of the on/off ramps at Junction 10 to a new junction at the main Naas to Newbridge dual carriageway (R445). A new interchange at Osberstown between junctions 9 and 10 was also built and designated Junction 9a. The project was fully completed in March 2021.

In April 2022, an average speed camera system went into operation on a 9km stretch between junction 26 and 27.

== Junctions ==
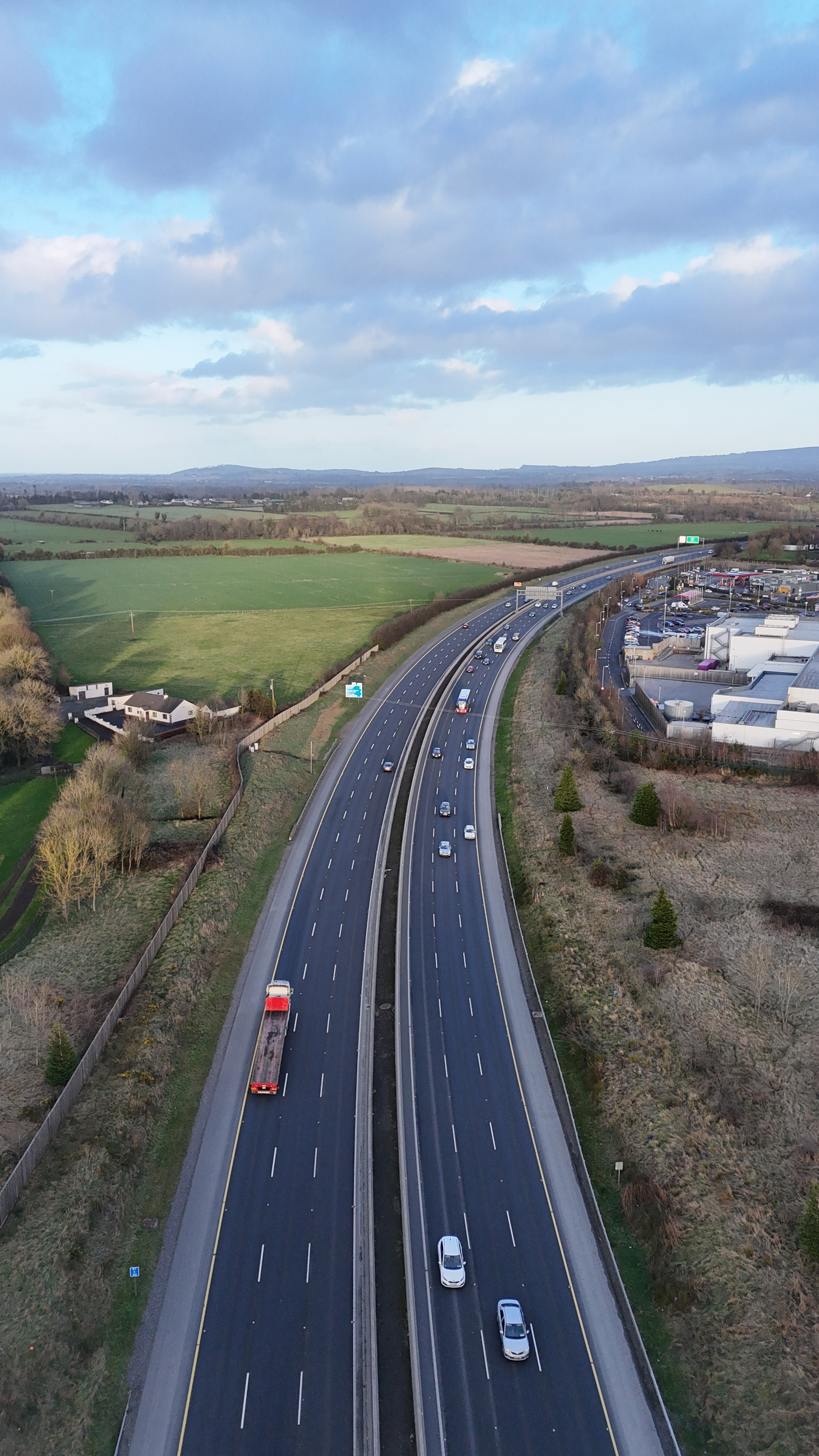
M7 Naas Bypass

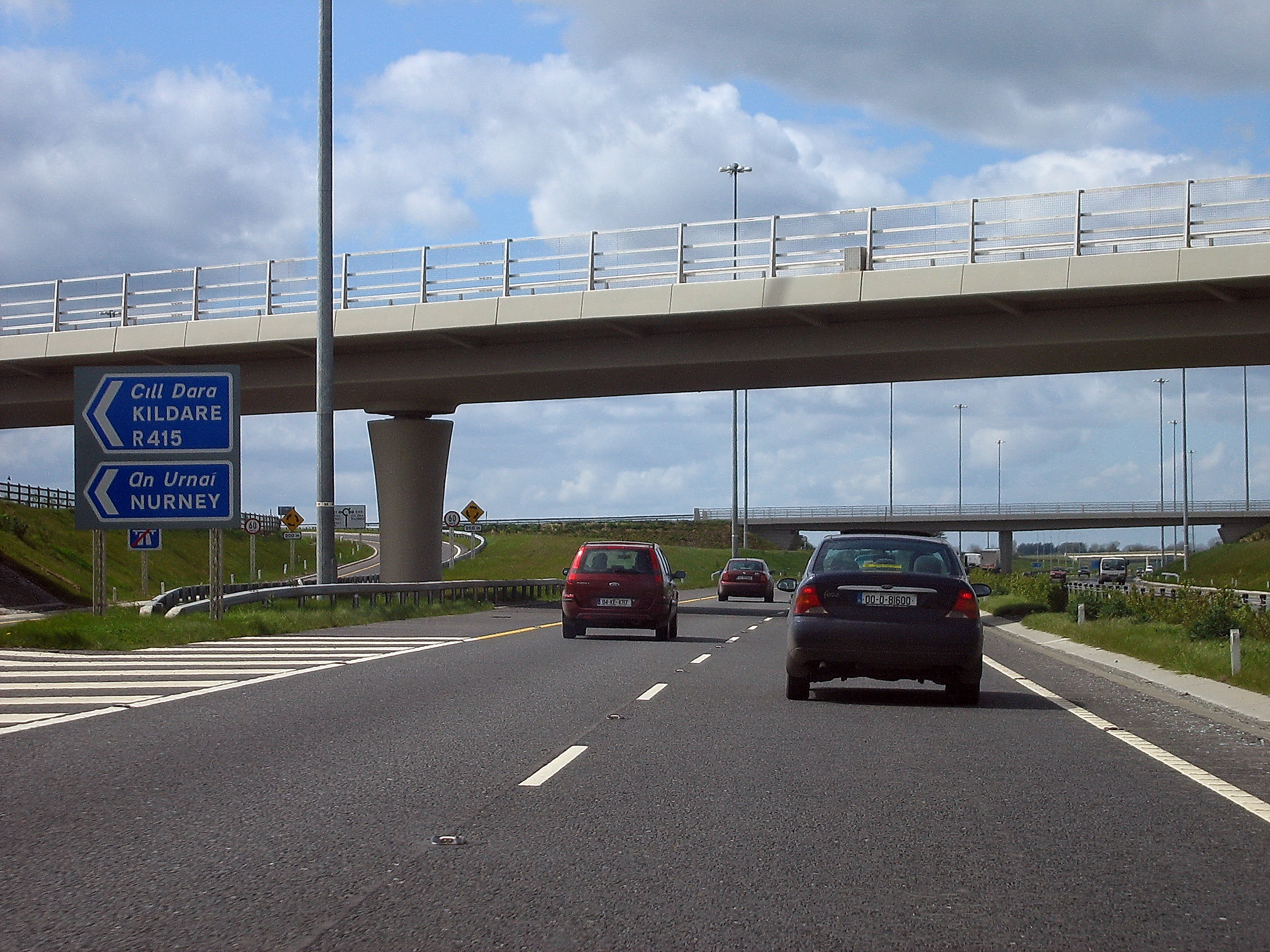
Junction 13 westbound on the M7 near Kildare

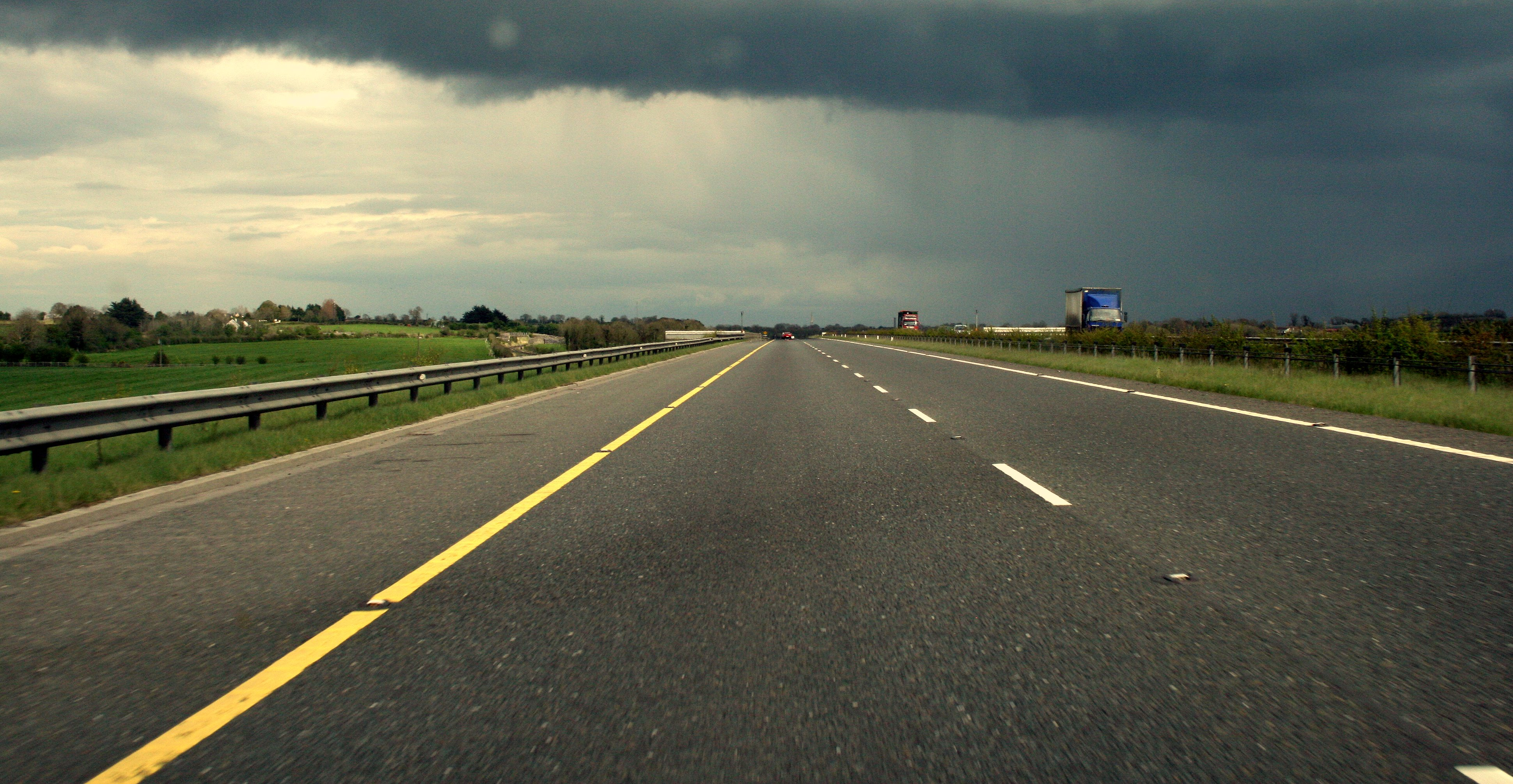
Raised section of the Kildare bypass

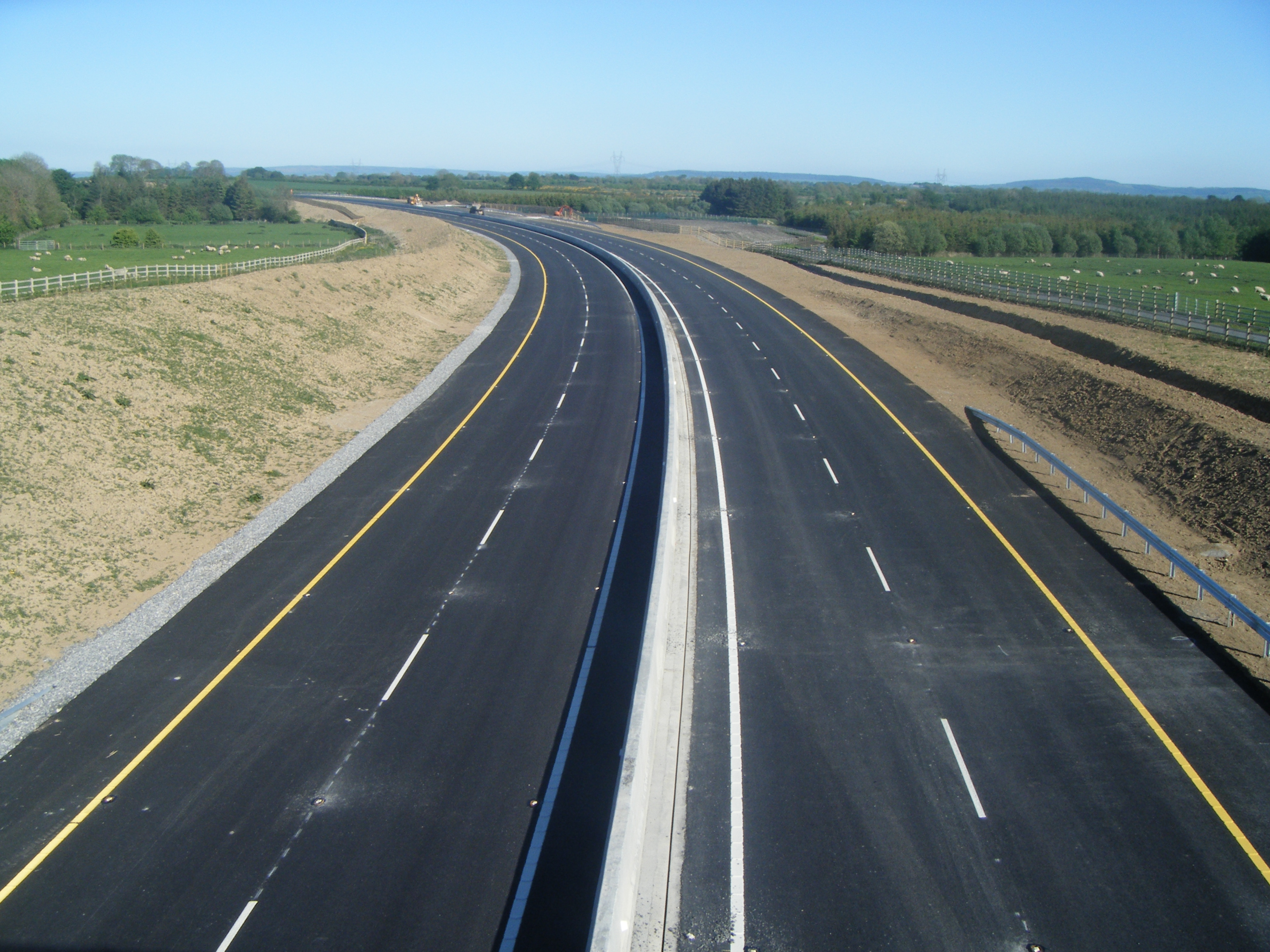
The M7 leg of the M7/M8 PPP scheme under construction east of Borris-in-Ossory, 22 May 2010

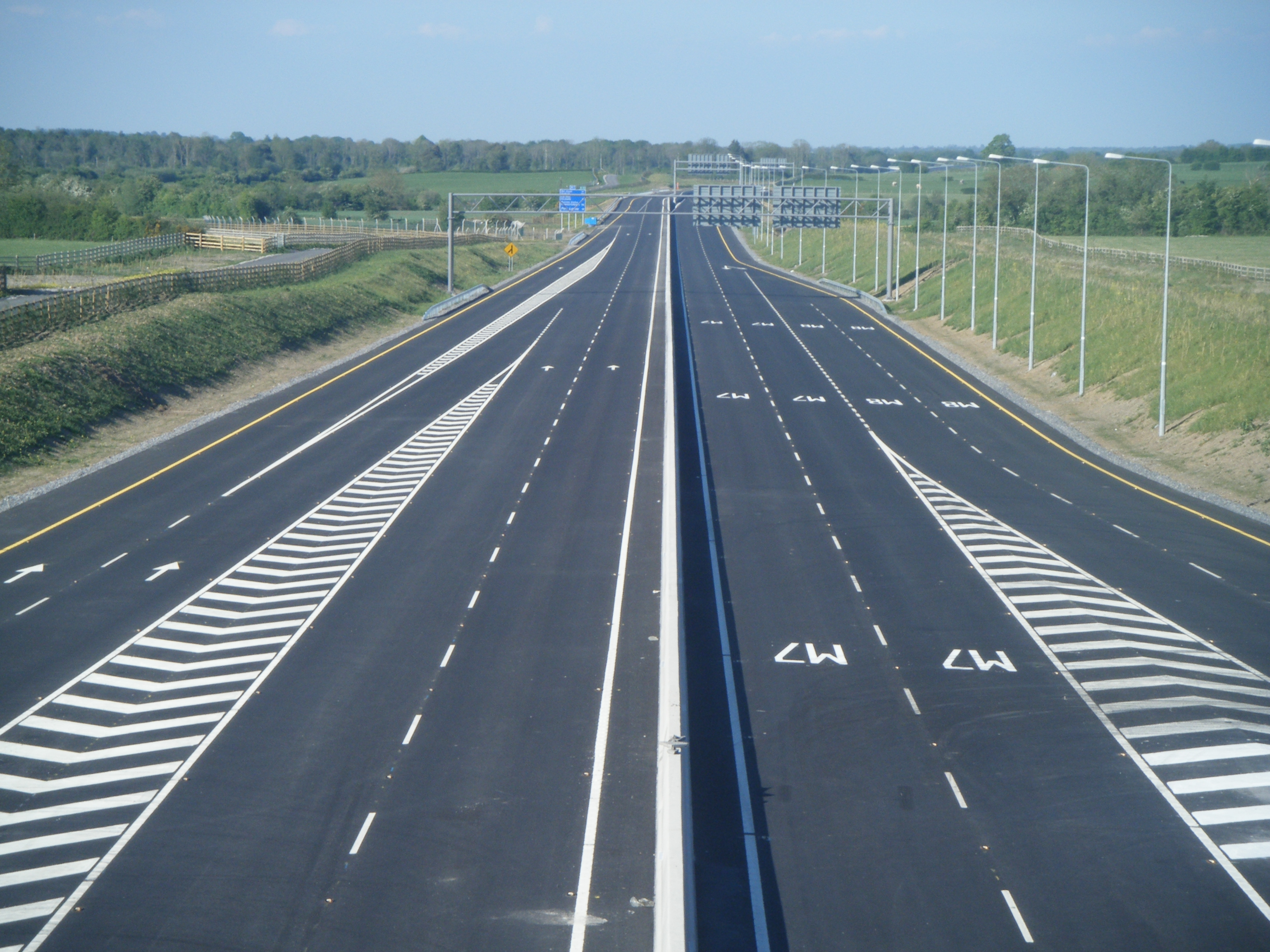
The M7/M8 interchange at M7 junction 19 days before the scheme opened to traffic on 28 May 2010

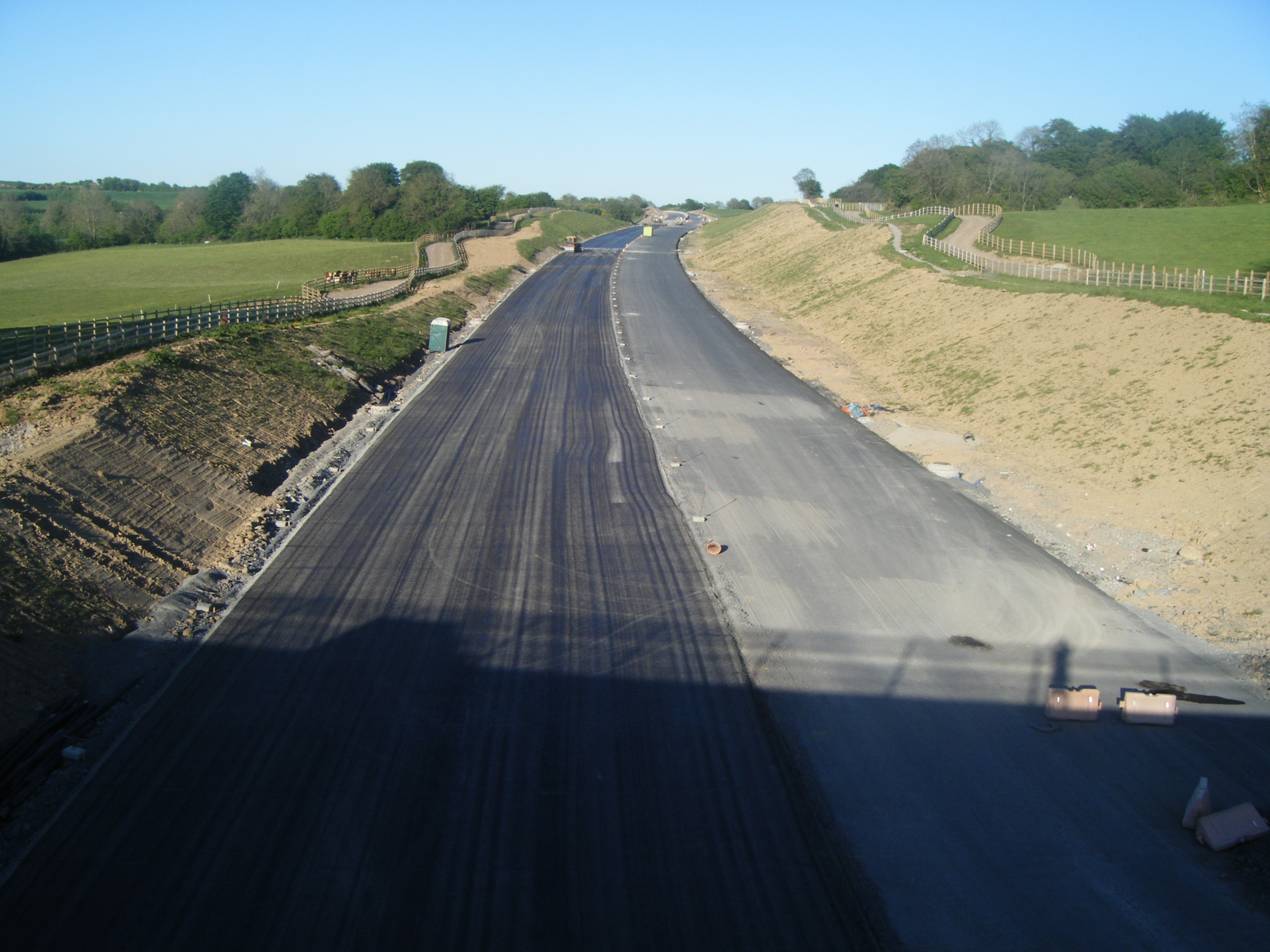
The M7 Castletown-Nenagh Scheme under construction east of Dunkerrin, 22 May 2010.

Junctions 1–8 form part of the N7 dual carriageway.

County	km	mi	Junction	Destinations	Notes
County Kildare	21	13	9	R445 Johnstown, Naas (North)	Incorrectly signposted as R450 heading eastbound. End of motorway, continues as N7 dual carriageway.
County Kildare	24.5	15.2	9a	R407 – Clane, Sallins	Millennium Park
County Kildare	28	17.4	10	R445 ‒ Naas (South), Newbridge,	Rathangan
County Kildare	32.5	20.2	11	M9 ‒ Waterford, Kilkenny, Kilcullen	Carlow; Eastbound entrance and westbound exit only.
County Kildare	38	20.2	12	R445 ‒ Newbridge R413 ‒ Kilcullen, The Curragh	Curragh Racecourse
County Kildare	44.5	27.6	13	R415 ‒ Kildare, Nurney, Kildangan (westbound); Kildare, Nurney (eastbound)	
County Kildare	51	31.7	14	R445 ‒ Monasterevin, Tullamore, Portarlington (westbound); Rathangan, Kildangan, Athy (eastbound)	Junction 14 Mayfield Service Area
County Laois	64.5	40.1	15	R422 – Mountmellick, R445 –Killenard, Ballybrittas (westbound) R445 – Monasterevin, Killenard, Ballybrittas (eastbound)	Emo, Vicarstown
County Laois	71	44.1	16	R445 – Port Laoise N80 ‒ Carlow	Portarlington is signposted heading eastbound.
County Laois	77.5	48.1	17	N77 ‒ Durrow, Abbeyleix R922 ‒ Port Laoise	Junction 17 Midway & Portlaoise Plaza Service Areas
County Laois	80.5	50	18	R445 ‒ Port Laoise, Tullamore, Castletown, Mountrath	
County Laois	84.5	52.5	M7/M8 Toll		
County Laois	95.5	59.3	19	M8 ‒ Cork, Durrow	
County Laois	106.5	66.1	21	R435 ‒ Borris-in-Ossory, Rathdowney	
County Tipperary	118.5	73.6	22	N62 ‒ Birr, Roscrea, Thurles, Templemore	LILO junction.
County Tipperary	130	80.7	23	R445 ‒ Moneygall, Cloghjordan, Dunkerrin	LILO junction. Toomevara is signposted heading westbound. Barack Obama Plaza Service Area
County Tipperary	142	88.2	24	R445 ‒ Nenagh	Toomevara is signposted heading eastbound.
County Tipperary	145	90	25	R498 ‒ Nenagh, Thurles	
County Tipperary	151.5	94.1	26	N52 ‒ Tullamore, Borrisokane, Nenagh	
County Tipperary	166.5	103.4	27	R494 ‒ Killaloe, Ballina, Birdhill	
County Limerick	178.5	110.8	28	R445 ‒ Limerick (East), Castletroy (westbound); Castletroy, Newport (R503) (eastbound)	Castleconnell, Cappamore (R506)
County Limerick	183.5	114	29	N24 ‒ Waterford R527 – Limerick (Centre), Ballysimon, Limerick	Tipperary
County Limerick	186.5	115.8	30	M20 ‒ Cork, Tralee (N21)	Killarney; End of motorway, continues as N18 dual carriageway.
1.000 mi = 1.609 km; 1.000 km = 0.621 mi: Incomplete access; Tolled; Route transition

== Motorway service areas ==
While there are several on-line service areas on the N7, there are none provided along the motorway section. There are instead a number of off-line service areas.

Junction 14 Mayfield, an independently owned service area, was opened in June 2011. Accessed from either direction, traffic must use the existing junction 14 slip roads with eastbound traffic then crossing to the south side of the motorway by bridge. Facilities include a Spar store and deli, an Insomnia Coffee and a Supermac's.

There are two service areas in operation at junction 17 outside Port Laoise. The Midway Food Court is operated by Applegreen and contains a Burger King, Subway and Chopstix noodle bar, as well as a Maldron hotel. The Portlaoise Plaza was opened in July 2020, despite objection from Petrogas, and consists of a Supermac's, Papa John's Pizza, Spar and Bewley's.

Barack Obama Plaza, an independently owned service area, opened at junction 23 on the outskirts of Moneygall, County Offaly (however the service area itself is in County Tipperary) and includes a Spar store, a Supermac's, Papa John's Pizza, Mac's Place (a deli) and Bewley's coffee. It is accessed using the existing junction 23 slip roads with eastbound traffic then passing under the motorway bridge.

Petrogas opened a service area in October 2014 at junction 27, the Birdhill exit. The Applegreen branded service area contains a Costa Coffee and a Burger King franchise. Traffic uses the existing slip roads with westbound traffic then passing over the motorway bridge.

== Roadside art on M7 ==
Roadside art is funded under the Percentage For Arts Scheme where 1% of the scheme budget is allocated to roadside art with a cap of €63,000. The local authorities decide on a theme and are responsible for commissioning the work, usually by open competition. There are several examples along the M7

- Perpetual Motion, a large sphere with road markings situated where the N7 becomes the M7 at Naas. Created by Remco de Fouw in collaboration with Rachel Joynt in 1995.
- Race of The Black Pig on the Kildare bypass. Artist Dan George created (2003) this 0.4 km long installation in three segments, East, Central and West groups.
- The Hitchhiker on the Monasterevin bypass. Artist Willie Malone created this phosphor bronze installation (2005) to represent the wheel. Jointly commissioned by Kildare and Laois County Councils. In March 2011 The Hitchhiker was removed from the side of the motorway by persons unknown.
- Doon a two-part earthwork with stainless steel superstructure located on the Portlaoise bypass. Viewed from the air the implication is that the earthwork ring stretches across the motorway. Artists Robert McColgan and Irene Benner.
- The Dandelion is on the north side of the M7 at Rathnaveogue between the Roscrea and Moneygall junctions. In two pieces a three dimensional figure of a girl blowing at a dandelion carved in bas relief from a large slab of stone. The Artist was Michael Disley.
- Architects of the Land, limestone figures of a Man and a Bull, one each side of M7 Nenagh Bypass. Artist Colin Grehan created the sculpture in 2001 from two massive limestone blocks. The mans legs merge into plough shears, his pose designed to indicate an imaginary link to the bull across the carriageways.

== Future ==
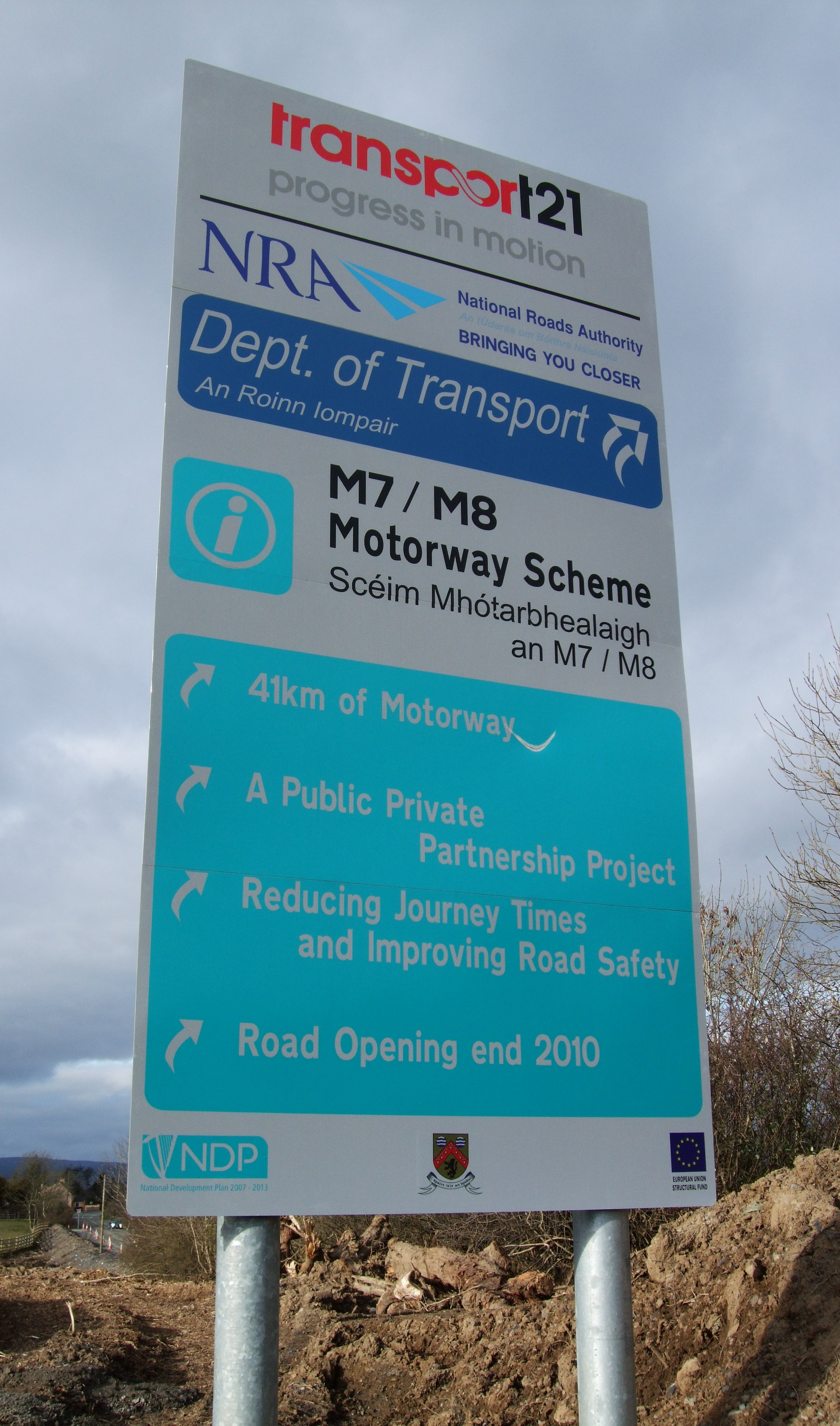
Transport 21 signage at the M7/M8 PPP scheme near Borris-in-Ossory.

=== Motorway redesignations affecting the M7 ===
On 30 September 2008, the Irish National Roads Authority released the second tranche of potential motorway redesignations. These included parts of the present N7/M7 route.

The M7 was to end at junction 28, where it would have blended into the N7 southern ring road scheme. On 10 July 2009, ministerial approval was given for 10 km of the Limerick southern-ring and the N7/N20 interchange (and all relevant slip-roads) to be redesignated to motorway status.

If various other schemes on the N7 are to be redesignated motorway (e.g., the section from Dublin to Naas), the route could reach up to 220 km in length.

== See also ==
- Roads in Ireland
- Motorways in Ireland
- National primary road
- National secondary road
- Regional road
