= Seán Ó Síocháin =

Irish hurler, Gaelic footballer and sports administrator

Personal information
- Native name: Seán Ó Síocháin (Irish)
- Born: John Sheehan; 24 March 1914 Cill na Martra, County Cork, Ireland
- Died: 2 February 1997 (aged 82) Clontarf, Dublin, Ireland
- Occupation: National school teacher

Sport
- Sport: Gaelic football
- Position: Midfield
Clubs
- Years: Club
- Macroom; Clann na Gael
Club titles
- Cork titles: 1
Inter-county
- Years: County
- 1935–1937 1938 1939–1941: Cork; Dublin; Cork
Inter-county titles
- Munster titles: 0
- All-Irelands: 0
- NFL: 0

Seán Ó Síocháin (24 March 1914 – 2 February 1997) was an Irish Gaelic footballer, hurler, ballad singer, broadcaster and Gaelic games administrator. His championship career with the Cork and Dublin senior teams spanned seven seasons from 1935 until 1941.

Born in Cill na Martra, County Cork, Ó Síocháin was the son of Daniel and Kate Sheehan (née Lynch). His father ran a small grocery business. Ó Síocháin was educated locally and, after qualifying as a national school teacher, moved to Dublin in 1935 where he taught for 11 years.

Ó Síocháin first played hurling and Gaelic football with the Macroom club and won a county senior championship medal with the club as a seventeen-year-old in 1931. He later joined the Clann na Gael club in Dublin. Ó Síocháin won two more county senior championship medals with his adopted club.

After impressing at club level, Ó Síocháin made his debut on the inter-county scene as a member of the Cork minor team in 1932. He subsequently joined the Cork senior team and made his debut during the 1935 championship. After declaring for Dublin he captained the senior team in 1938, however, Ó Síocháin returned to the Cork team the following year and continued to play for them until his retirement in 1941.

By this stage Ó Síocháin was known nationally as a ballad singer and did some broadcasts for Radió Éireann on such programmes as Ireland is Singing, Round the Fire and Balladmakers' Saturday Night. He toured the United States on four occasions with Irish singers and was also a member of the Dublin Grand Opera Society.

Ó Síocháin's career as an official with the Gaelic Athletic Association began in 1946 when he filled a vacancy for assistant secretary, resigning from his teaching post to work full-time with the association. He was elected General-Secretary in 1964, succeeding Pádraig Ó Caoimh. The title was changed to Director-General in 1972, with Ó Síocháin retaining the post until his retirement in 1979. He continued to work for the GAA and was appointed director of fund raising for the new Ceannáras building which was completed in 1982.

Ó Síocháin died on 2 February 1997. His daughter, Orla Ní Síocháin, was a three-time All-Ireland medal winner with the Dublin camogie team while his son-in-law, Jack Ryan, won an All-Ireland medal with Tipperary. Ó Síocháin's grandson, Shane Ryan, was a six-time Leinster medal winner with the Dublin senior team.
