= Barack Obama Plaza =

Motorway service area in Tipperary, Ireland, named after the US President

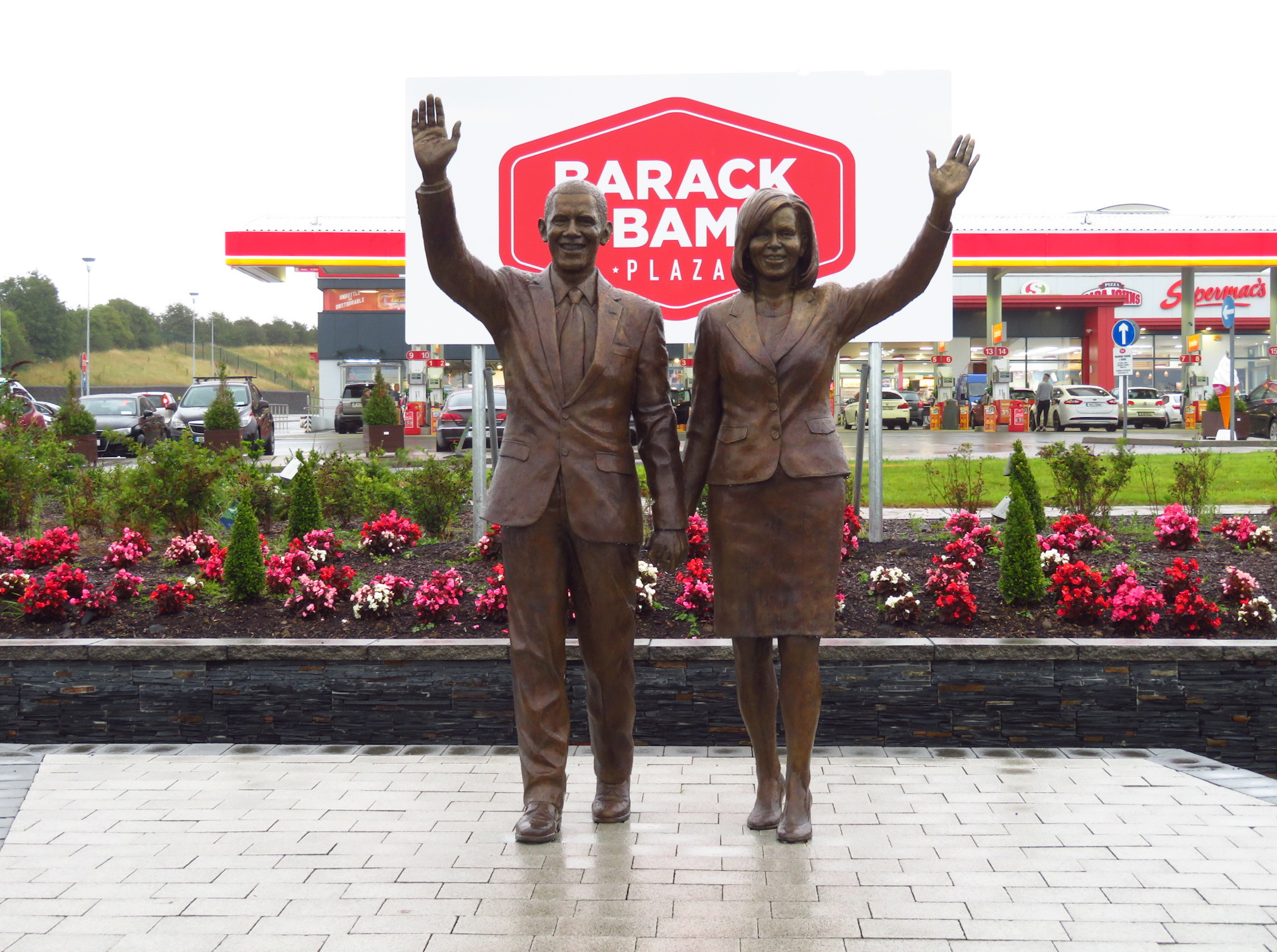
- Bronze sculpture of Barack and Michelle Obama by Mark Rhodes in the plaza

- Location within Ireland

Information
- County: Tipperary, on the County Offaly border
- Road: R445 road at Exit 23 off the M7 motorway
- Coordinates: 52.884894°N 7.945059°W
- Facilities: Petrol, EV charging, shop, fast food, sandwiches, coffee, toilets, visitor centre, meeting rooms and wifi.
- Operator: Pat and Una McDonagh
- Date opened: 30 May 2014
- Website: http://www.barackobamaplaza.ie

Barack Obama Plaza (also known as Obaza) is a motorway service area on the R445 road at Junction 23, just off the M7 motorway in County Tipperary, Ireland. It is beside the village of Moneygall, which is just across the county border in County Offaly, and is accessed using the Junction 23 slip roads. It is named after U.S. president Barack Obama, whose third great-grandfather, Falmouth Kearney, lived in Moneygall and emigrated to the US in 1850. The Plaza cost €7 million to construct and opened on 30 May 2014. An Obama museum–visitor centre opened on the following 4 July. The Plaza is owned and operated by Pat McDonagh and his wife Una McDonagh.

== Facilities ==
The service station, operating under the Circle K brand, has 26 petrol pumps across two forecourts, offering unleaded petrol, diesel, MGO (marine gas oil), diesel exhaust fluid, and LPG (liquefied petroleum gas). Charging stations include a fast-charge ESB electric car charge point.

In addition to fuel supplies, there are a variety of food outlets, including Supermac's, Papa John's Pizza, Mac's Place Bakery and Carvery, Bewleys coffee and a Spar shop. The Plaza also includes a visitor centre that provides information on Obama's family connections to Moneygall, where his great-great-great-grandfather lived until emigrating in 1850. The centre also has five meeting rooms and a large function room.

A Local Link bus service, No. 854 between Roscrea and Nenagh, calls at Barack Obama Plaza seven days a week. The service connects with the local communities of Toomevara, Cloughjordan and Shinrone.

== Art ==
A bronze bust of Barack Obama by Mark Rhodes, commissioned by Plaza owner Pat McDonagh, was unveiled inside the Plaza by the US Ambassador to Ireland, Kevin O'Malley, on 22 September 2016. On 20 August 2018, life-sized bronze sculptures of Barack and Michelle Obama, also by Mark Rhodes, were unveiled outside the Plaza by Cody Keenan, a former Obama speechwriter.
