= Pádraig Ó Caoimh =

Former soldier and GAA administrator

- Born: Patrick Joseph O'Keeffe; 9 December 1897; Bellanagare, County Roscommon, Ireland
- Died: 15 May 1964 (aged 66); Rathgar, Dublin, Ireland
- Resting place: Glasnevin Cemetery
- Education: Christian Brothers College
- Alma mater: St. Mary's University
- Occupation: Secondary school teacher
- Employer: Gaelic Athletic Association
- Known for: Secretary of the Gaelic Athletic Association (1929-1964)
- Parent(s): Michael O'Keeffe; Mary O'Malley

Patrick Joseph O'Keeffe was an Irish soldier and long-time administrator of the Gaelic Athletic Association (GAA). Páirc Uí Chaoimh, the home of the Cork GAA, is named after him.

== Early life ==
Ó Caoimh was born in Roscommon in 1897.

He moved to Cork City at an early age; the 1911 census records him living at No. 13 East View Terrace on Quaker Road. He lived with his father (an RIC Pensioner and Draper), his brother and his three sisters. One of these siblings, or some other relatives, would later live in Ballynoe, near Castlelyons, in County Cork.

He was educated by the Christian Brothers in Cork and was an active member of the Gaelic Athletic Association.

After leaving school he trained as a Secondary School teacher at Saint Mary's College in London, returning to Cork to teach at Presentation Brothers College.

In 1916, when he was 18, he joined the Irish Volunteers.

In 1919, at the age of 21, Ó Caoimh gave up school teaching to become a full-time Volunteer officer and secretary of the Cork County Board, G.A.A.

== Irish War of Independence ==
During the Irish War of Independence, Ó Caoimh served with A Company (University Company), 2nd Battalion, Cork No. 1 Brigade, IRA.

His organisational talents impressed his superiors and in 1920 he was given another appointment as manager of the Employment Bureau (established by the First Dáil).

In November 1920, Ó Caoimh and about twenty other A Company Volunteers received orders to collect their weapons from the company arms dump and report to their headquarters in UCC From there the men were sent to a Fire Brigade storage shed on O'Sullivan's Quay to await further orders. After some hours word came that the British Forces they had been mobilised to ambush had moved and at 18:45 they were ordered to set off home. Volunteer Michael O'Donoghue, "Now we made our way home to our 'digs' in twos and threes carrying our guns, keeping them with us until we were instructed to return them to the dump. I went south up Sullivan's Quay alone, crossed over Parliament Bridge and back via Prince's St. and Oliver Plunkett St. to my 'den' in 31 Grand Parade. Paddy O'Keeffe came a few yards behind me with Captain O'Sullivan ["a pal of O'Keeffe's"], O'Keefe dallied a minute to drop into Peg Duggan's new flower and fruit shop just at the Bridge. (Peg was senior officer of Cork Cumann na mBan, and had been working two years earlier in my old 'digs' (Fitzgerald's at 104 Old Georges St.)). It was a few minutes to seven. Curfew zero hour. O'Keeffe merged, Four or five tall men in civvies with levelled revolvers order him to put up his hands. O'Keeffe resourceful, yet not quite realising the position, delays a little asking'"What's up, lads?", half-thinking them to be fellow I.R.A. men. A gun rammed into his back with a curse bring home to him the awful truth that they are Auxiliaries and that he is in deadly peril. On searching him, they find a hand grenade. Almost at the same time, he Sees O'Sullivan some yards from him at the bridge, being disarmed. Now O'Keeffe realised that the 'Auxies' would likely shoot him on the spot. A flash of desperate Inspiration: "Here", he says to the 'Auxies', the District Inspector down at Union Quay knows all about this, Take me there and District Inspector so and so will explain my job to you". The bluff worked. P. O'Keeffe was playing for time – a respite. He felt that if he was brought to Union Quay Barracks, he would be safe at least from being murdered on the spot; that he might get a judicial trial first, or court-martial, which would take him out of the murderous hands of the bloodthirsty 'Auxies'. Arrived at Union Quay R.I.C. Barracks, O'Keeffe was recognised as a wanted I.R.A. man The 'Auxies' were enraged and wanted to kill him on the spot in the day-room of the barracks, but the R.I.C. saved him to stand his trial and die on the scaffold, as they thought. He was court-martialled and charged with possession of a bomb. Sentence: 15 years penal servitude served in Parkhurst and other English prisons. He was lucky to escape the death penalty and so was his comrade, O'Sullivan, who got twenty years penal."

Ó Caoimh was transferred to Parkhurst prison on the Isle of Wight at the start of 1921. There were over seven hundred men imprisoned there at the time; the authorities had decided to divide up the Irish Republican prisoners so they would each be housed with forty regular prisoners. Volunteer James Allen Busby "We refused to agree to this and barricaded our cells. For this some of our lads were taken to what were known as the 'silent cells'. These cells were underground. Crowe [Maurice Crow of Emly, County Tipperary (I.R.A. prisoner's Commandant)] applied to see the Governor of the prison and told him that we would tear the place down, brick by brick, if our lads were not released from the underground cells. We refused to associate with any convicts but our own lads, and when walking in circles on the exercise ground we arranged to break ranks and get together, whereupon the warders set upon us and rushed us to our cells. I remember on one occasion, for three weeks running we gave what we called our "concert party". When lights were out at night, we kept up a constant din, shouting and singing Irish songs. At periods the warders tried to undress us to give us a bath; we fought them on this and refused to go for a bath unless we went in a party with our own lads. We also threatened to go on strike against the fortnightly convicts' haircutting. Everything that was possible to do, we did, to upset prison discipline and force the authorities to treat us as a group apart from the other convicted prisoners. Eventually the warders themselves threatened to go on strike because of the trouble we were causing them. Finally, the Governor agreed to 'house' us in cells all on the one landing and, after consultation with Crowe, our commandant, allowed us to remain together and not associate with the other prisoners. The Reverend Father Dominic [O'Connor, "the patriot Franciscan"] wore prison garb and was detained in the hospital wing. His hair (or beard) was not cut and he was permitted to say Mass every day. Paddy O'Keeffe of Cork, the present General Secretary of the Gaelic Athletic, used serve Fr. Dominic's Mass."

Ó Caoimh was released the year after the 1921 Anglo-Irish Treaty.

He took a position as manager of a Cork Tobacco company called M & P O’Sullivan Ltd and was also the Company Secretary and married a lady named Peig.

== General Secretary of the GAA ==
In 1929, the position of General Secretary of the G.A.A. became vacant for the first time in almost 30 years. The Governing Body of the GAA, the Central Council, decided that applicants must be members of the Association for a minimum of five years, must be under 40 years of age, and would have to undergo a qualifying examination consisting of Irish (oral and written), English, arithmetic and book-keeping. The chosen candidate would act as both the Secretary of the GAA and the Manager of Croke Park; be paid a salary of £300 (rising in annual increments of £10 to a maximum of £400), and be provided with a free house and electric light.

There were a total of 11 applications for the post, only 9 of these attended the August 1929 examinations. After the examinations two rounds of votes were taken; on the final vote 31-year-old Padraig Ó Caoimh defeated F. Burke by 11 votes to 10. He resigned his positions at the Munster tobacco company and at the Cork County Board, and was appointed Secretary of the GAA.

Within three years of his appointment his renowned organisational skills were put to the test. In 1932 Croke Park hosted both the Tailteann Games and the Eucharistic Congress. The Eucharistic Congress in particular required a great deal of organisation with Ó Caoimh responsible for up to 2,000 stewards.

By far the most controversial episode in Ó Caoimh's 35-year career was the removal of Douglas Hyde, President of Ireland, as a Patron of the Association in 1938. Hyde broke the GAA's ban on "foreign games" by attending an international soccer match in Dublin. The question raised by Éamon de Valera in 1946 was whether Ó Caoimh should have warned Hyde on the implications of attending a soccer match and thus allowing Hyde to retire quietly as a Patron.

One of Ó Caoimh's key achievements was the staging of the 1947 All-Ireland Senior Football Final in the Polo Grounds, New York. One has to remember that in 1947 Europe, and America, were still recovering from World War II, air travel was still relatively novel and communications were still primitive. In the space of five months Ó Caoimh oversaw the transfer of the All-Ireland Final to America and its radio broadcast back to Ireland.

While the Polo Grounds Final achieved its ultimate aim of rejuvenating the Association in America, Ó Caoimh, for the rest of his tenure, had to spend a disproportionately high amount of his time organising the GAA in America. The post-1947 relationship between the GAA in Ireland and the GAA in New York was, at times, fragile. A number of experiments were tried such as the St. Brendan Cup Competition, the inclusion of New York in the National League Finals and the initiation of a World Championship Series. Yet there was a constant degree of disharmony either within the American GAA itself or between Ireland and America. Ó Caoimh patiently and diplomatically sought, and tested, solutions that would placate both parties.

One lasting legacy of the Ó Caoimh era that is still evident today is the drive he initiated to have a GAA-owned pitch in every parish. In 1957 a Parks Committee (Coiste na bPáirc) was formed to advise on a unified plan for the development of grounds. From this Parks Committee came the 'Grounds Plan' which saw grounds being purchased and refurbished, with grants from the Central Council, on a phased basis i.e. Provincial Grounds in phase one of the plan, County Grounds in phase two etc. In paying tribute to O'Caoimh after his death Alf Ó Muiri, President of the Association, stated that "in 1929 there were 1,500 clubs, in 1963 there were more than 3,000…the number of grounds owned in 1929 must have been very few, there are now close on 400 grounds owned and properly vested in the Association".

Ó Caoimh continued to work through a long period of poor health (he underwent four major operations between 1944 and 1963) and the Central Council acted to reduce his workload and employed new staff, including his successor-to-be Seán Ó Síocháin.

Ó Caoimh died in May 1964 (aged 66), a few months before completing 35 years as Secretary of the GAA. An obituary in The Irish Times stated that "under his administrative genius the GAA became by far the strongest sports organisation in the country and reputedly the biggest amateur association of its kind in the world. During his term of office, its membership grew to the huge proportions of today, including powerful branches in the United States, Britain, Australia and Africa; imposing stadia, of which Croke Park was his special care. Without his ability to co-ordinate plan and inspire, only a fraction of this extraordinary progress could have been achieved."

== Páirc Uí Chaoimh ==
In 1974, a new home for Cork Gaelic games was built in Ballintemple, Cork. The stadium, a modern bowl-shaped ground with a covered stand, an open-air stand and two terraces behind each goalpost, had a capacity of 50,000 when it was opened and was the first to be custom-built from scratch by the G.A.A. The new stadium was named in Páirc Uí Chaoimh in honour of Pádraig Ó Caoimh.

In 2015, the forty-year-old stadium was demolished and a new stadium, retaining the same name, was built on the same site and opened in 2017.

Sporting positions
Preceded by Luke O'Toole	Secretary of the Gaelic Athletic Association; 1929–1964	Succeeded by Seán Ó Síocháin
