= Philip Ryan (dual player) =

Irish hurler and Gaelic footballer

Personal information
- Native name: Pilib Ó Riain (Irish)
- Born: 1944 (age 81–82) Dunkerrin, County Offaly, Ireland

Sport
- Sport: Hurling
- Position: Left wing-forward
Club
- Years: Club
- Moneygall
Club titles
- Tipperary titles: 2
Inter-county
- Years: County
- 1972–1975: Tipperary
Inter-county titles
- Munster titles: 0
- All-Irelands: 0
- NHL: 0
- All Stars: 0

Philip Ryan (born 1944) is an Irish former hurler and Gaelic footballer. His championship career as a dual player with the Tipperary senior teams spanned eleven seasons from 1965 until 1975.

Born in Dunkerrin, County Offaly, Ryan was raised in a family that had a strong association with Gaelic games. His father, Séamus Ó Riain, had played junior hurling and football with Tipperary in the 1940s before becoming a Gaelic games administrator. He served in numerous roles with the Tipperary County Board and the Munster Council before becoming President of the Gaelic Athletic Association in 1967. Ryan's brothers – Jack, Séamus and Eugene – would all later play for Tipperary at various levels.

Ryan first played competitive Gaelic football and hurling with the Moneygall club at juvenile and underage levels. After winning several divisional titles in both codes, Ryan won back-to-back county senior championship medals in 1975 and 1976.

Ryan made his debut on the inter-county scene at the age of twenty when he was selected for the Tipperary under-21 and junior football teams. He later joined the under-21 hurling team and was an All-Ireland U21HC runner-up in 1965. That year Ryan was added to the Tipperary senior football panel, before joining the senior hurling panel in 1970. He retired from inter-county hurling following the conclusion of the 1975 championship.

Ryan's sister-in-law, Orla Ní Síocháin, was a three-time All-Ireland SCC medal winner with the Dublin senior team, while his nephew, Shane Ryan, was a six-time Leinster SFC medal winner with the Dublin senior team.

== Honours ==
Moneygall

- Tipperary Senior Hurling Championship (2): 1975, 1976

Tipperary

- Munster Under-21 Hurling Championship (1): 1965
