= Luke O'Toole =

Gaelic sporting administrator first Secretary-General of the GAA

Secretary-General of the Gaelic Athletic Association
- In office 1901–1929
- Preceded by: Frank Dineen
- Succeeded by: Pádraig Ó Caoimh

Personal details
- Born: 25 October 1873 Ballycumber, County Wicklow, Ireland
- Died: 17 July 1929 (aged 56) Drumcondra, Dublin, Ireland

Luke Joseph O'Toole (21 June 1873 – 17 July 1929) was an Irish Gaelic games administrator. He served as the first full-time Secretary-General of the Gaelic Athletic Association from 1901 until 1929.

O'Toole is credited with changing the GAA and, when he died in office in 1929 is described as leaving behind "an organisation which was prosperous, efficient, owned its own grounds and offices" and organised well-run championships. He was a key figure in the negotiations leading to the development of a playing field at Jones' Road which later became Croke Park. O'Toole also organised the Tailteann Games in 1924 and 1928.
