= Moneygall =

Village in County Offaly, Ireland

Moneygall Muine Gall (Irish)
- Village
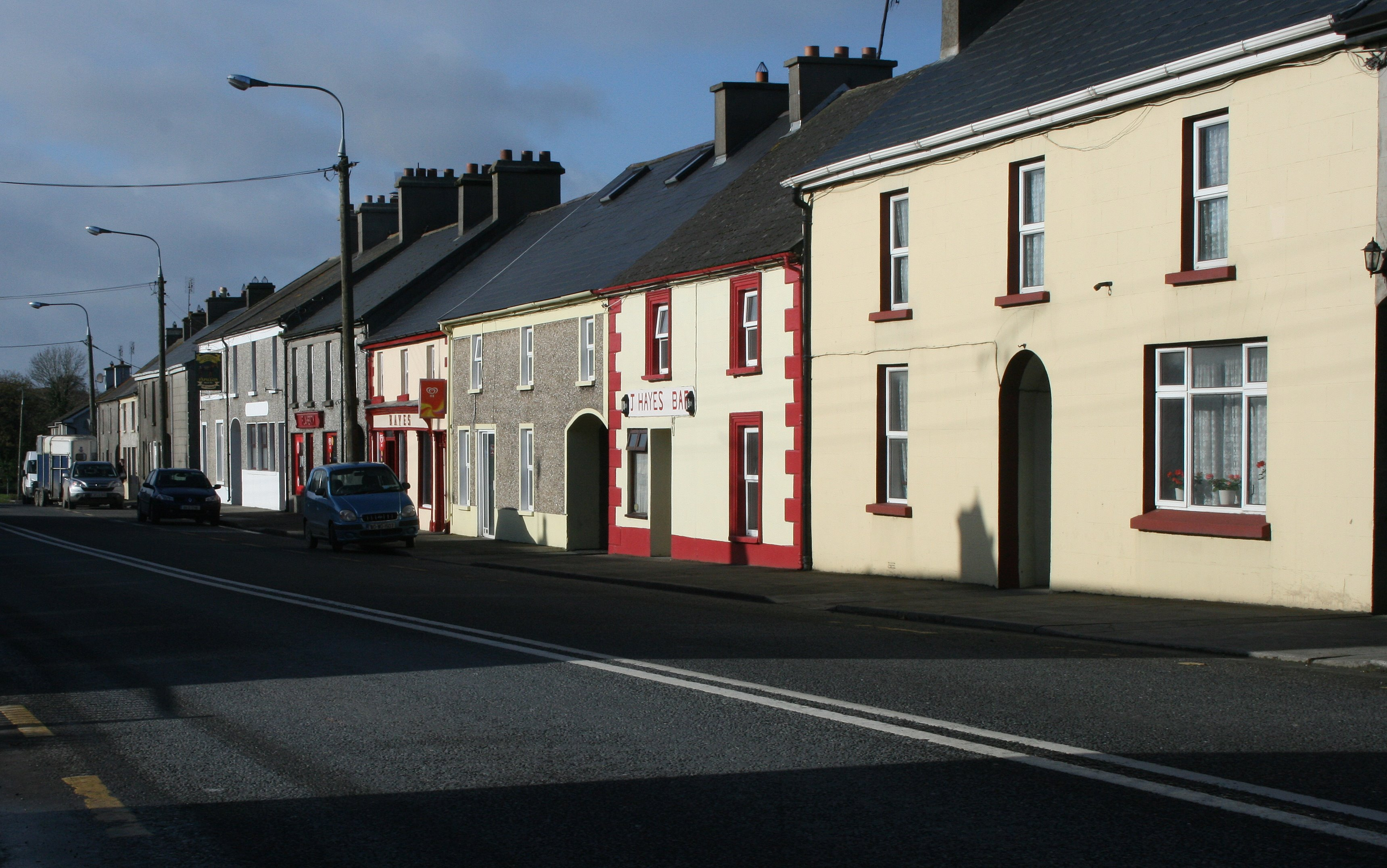
- Main Street

- Location in Ireland
- Coordinates: 52°52′48″N 7°57′23″W
- Country: Ireland
- Province: Leinster
- County: County Offaly

Government
  - Dáil constituency: Offaly
- Elevation: 120 m (390 ft)

Population (2022)
  - Total: 374
- Time zone: UTC+0 (WET)
  - Summer (DST): UTC-1 (IST (WEST))
- Irish Grid Reference: S028811

Moneygall (Irish: Muine Gall, meaning 'foreigners' thicket') is a village in County Offaly, bordering County Tipperary, in Ireland. It is 16 km east of Nenagh, on the R445 road between Dublin and Limerick. There were 374 people living in the village as of the 2022 census. Moneygall has a Catholic church, motorway service station, a car sales and repair centre, a national school, a Garda station and a pub. The nearest Church of Ireland church, Borrisnafarney, is 2 km from the village beside the former Loughton Demesne.

The village received international attention for being the ancestral home of Falmouth Kearney, a maternal great-great-great-grandfather of Barack Obama. Obama visited the village in 2011.

Moneygall is in the Dáil constituency of Offaly. It was previously in the constituency of Laois-Offaly and was one term in the Tipperary North Dáil constituency.

== Transport ==
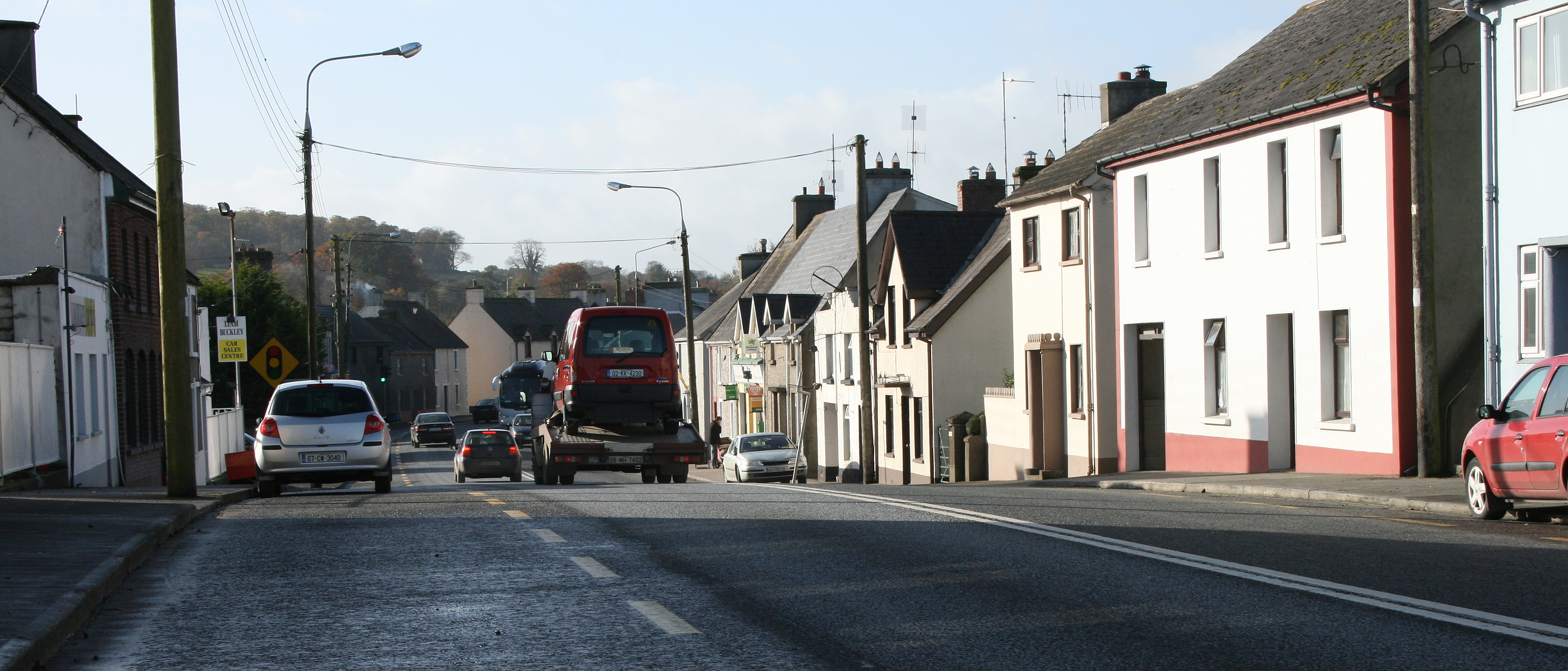
The R445 Limerick to Dublin road passes through Moneygall

Moneygall is on the R445 regional road and close to the M7 motorway, where Junction 23 provides access to the village.

Bus Éireann no longer provides a service to Moneygall. As of 2019, bus service 854, operated by Local Link Tipperary between Roscrea railway station and Nenagh, called at Main Street and Obama Plaza. The service operates seven days a week.

There is no train station in the village but the nearest stations are in Nenagh, Cloughjordan and Roscrea, all on the Limerick-Ballybrophy railway line, a feeder service to the main Cork to Dublin line, operated by Iarnród Éireann.

The closest airport with scheduled passenger services is Shannon Airport in County Clare.

== Education ==
There is one Catholic national school in the village. The former Church of Ireland school (now used as a parish hall) was built in 1888 beside the R490 Borrisokane turn-off, and closed in 1976, when its pupils were transferred to the neighbouring village of Cloughjordan. An earlier building, constructed around 1800, was previously used as a school. It was then used by the local Church of Ireland community as a chapel of ease until the late 1970s. It has now been converted to a private residence.

Children travel mainly to either Roscrea or Nenagh for secondary schooling. The nearest third-level institutions are Tipperary Institute in Thurles or the University of Limerick, Limerick Institute of Technology and Mary Immaculate College, all of which are in Limerick.

== Sport ==
While all of the village is located in County Offaly, the Gaelic Athletic Association playing field is located in County Tipperary, and Moneygall GAA play in the Tipperary GAA Championships.

Moneygall FC opened its new grounds in 2017 in the centre of the village. The club, while based in County Offaly, compete in North Tipperary.

== Demographics ==
As of the 2016 census, there were 313 people living in Moneygall. The previous 2011 census counted 310 people in the village (153 males and 157 females). This, in turn, was an increase of 12 people (4%) since the census of 2006.

== Connection with Barack Obama ==
Falmouth Kearney, a maternal great-great-great-grandfather of Barack Obama, 44th President of the United States, emigrated from Moneygall to New York City at the age of 19 in 1850 and eventually resettled in Tipton County, Indiana. Kearney's father, Joseph, had been the village shoemaker. The Kearney family emigrated to Ross County, Ohio, in the first half of the 19th century. Falmouth Kearney's youngest daughter, Mary Ann, moved from Indiana to Kansas after her father's death in 1878. Mary Ann Kearney was the paternal grandmother of Stanley Dunham, President Obama's maternal grandfather.

On 23 May 2011, Obama and First Lady Michelle Obama, visited Moneygall as part of a visit to Ireland. They were welcomed by 5,000 people and greeted upon arrival by the President's eighth cousin, Henry Healy. Following a walkabout on the main street, where they shook hands with many local residents, the Obamas entered a house that had been built on the site where Falmouth Kearney had lived. Afterwards, they visited Ollie Hayes's pub to meet more of the President's distant relatives and to study the birth records of his ancestors. President and Mrs. Obama drank Irish stout to the traditional toast, sláinte (meaning "good health"), and Mrs. Obama went behind the bar to learn how to pull a pint.

The Barack Obama Plaza service area was opened at Junction 23 of the M7 motorway on the outskirts of Moneygall in June 2014. Life-sized bronze sculptures of Barack and Michelle Obama were added outside the Plaza in August 2018.

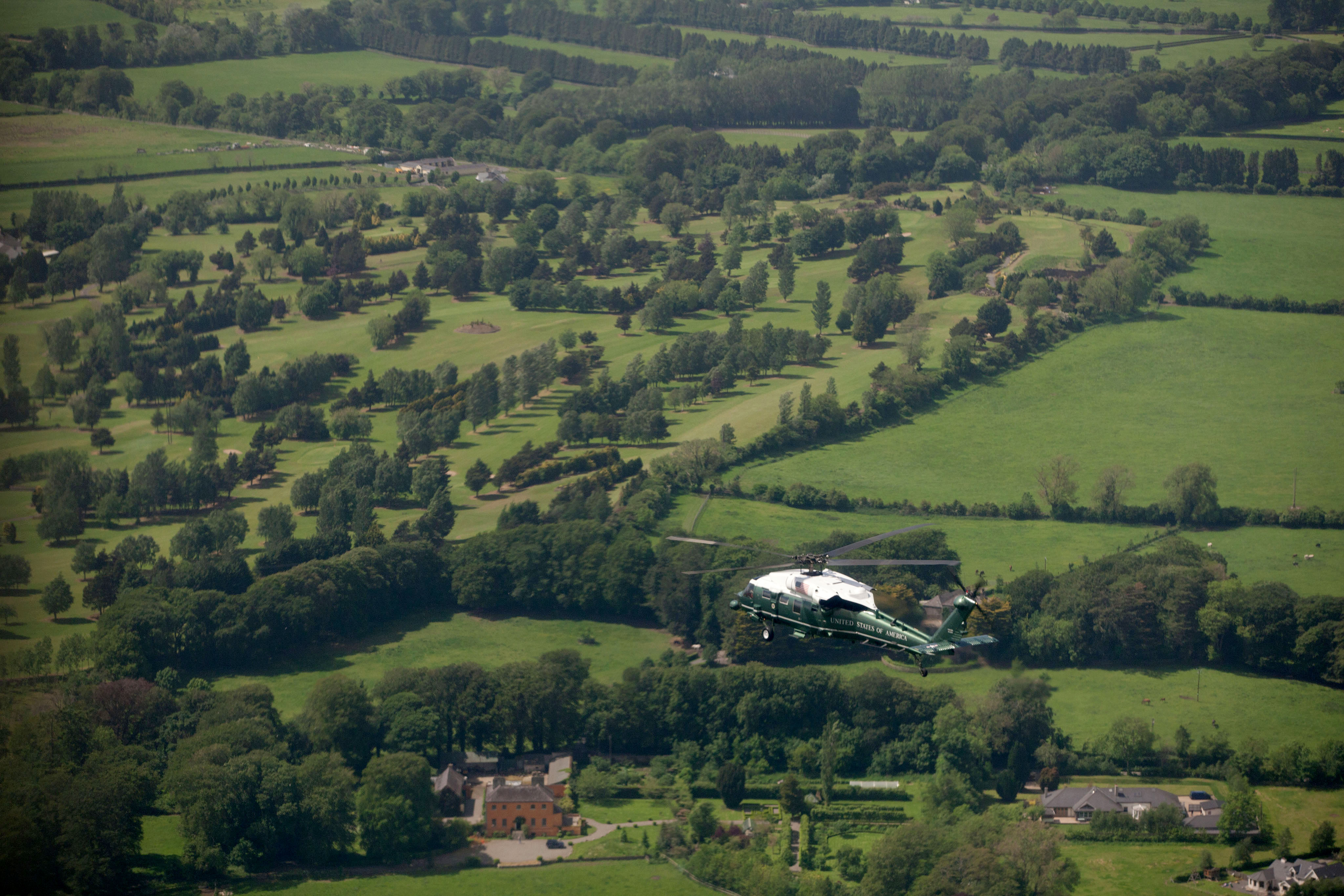
Presidential helicopter "Marine One" flies to Moneygall

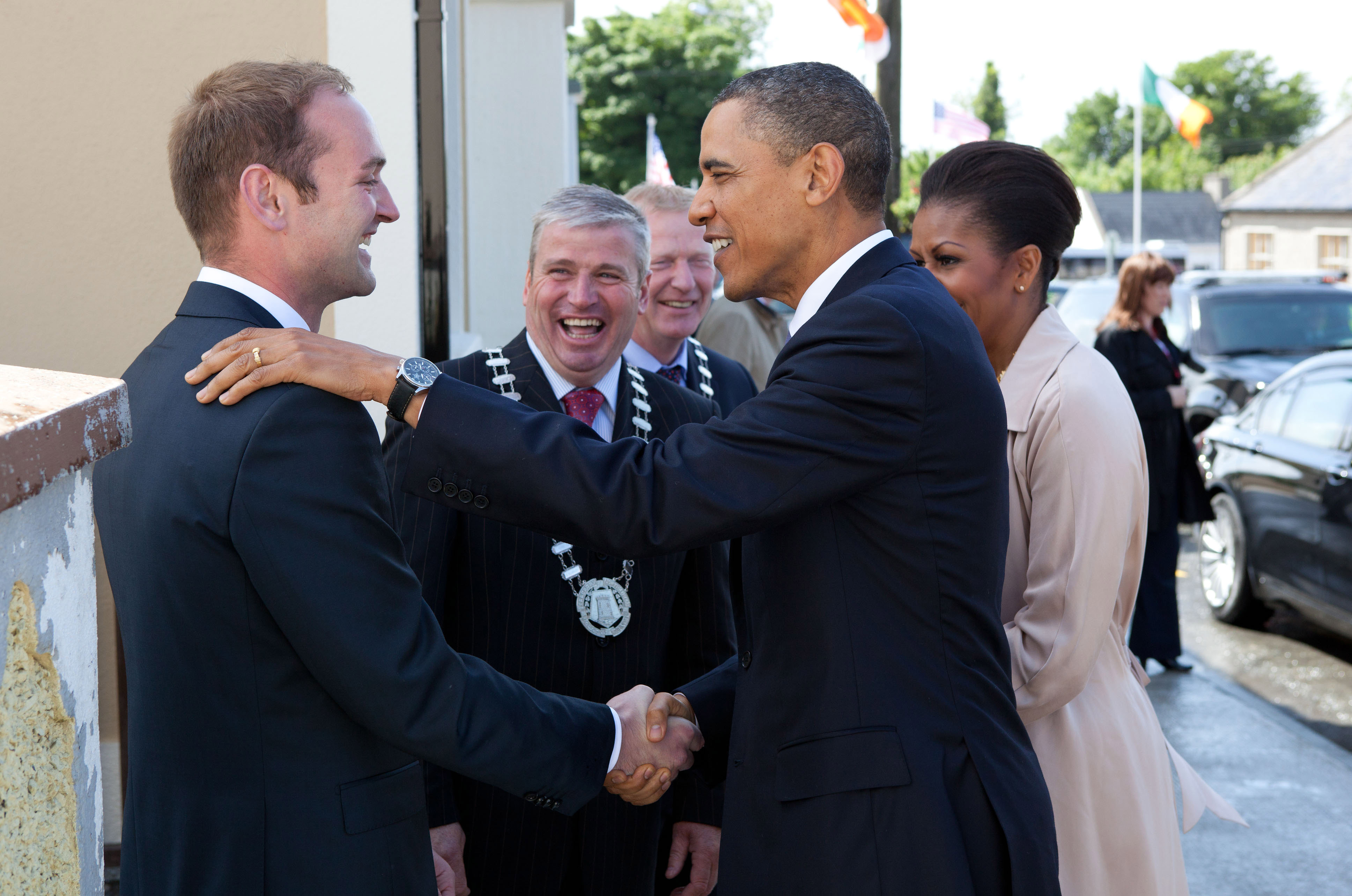
Henry Healy greets his eighth cousin, Barack Obama

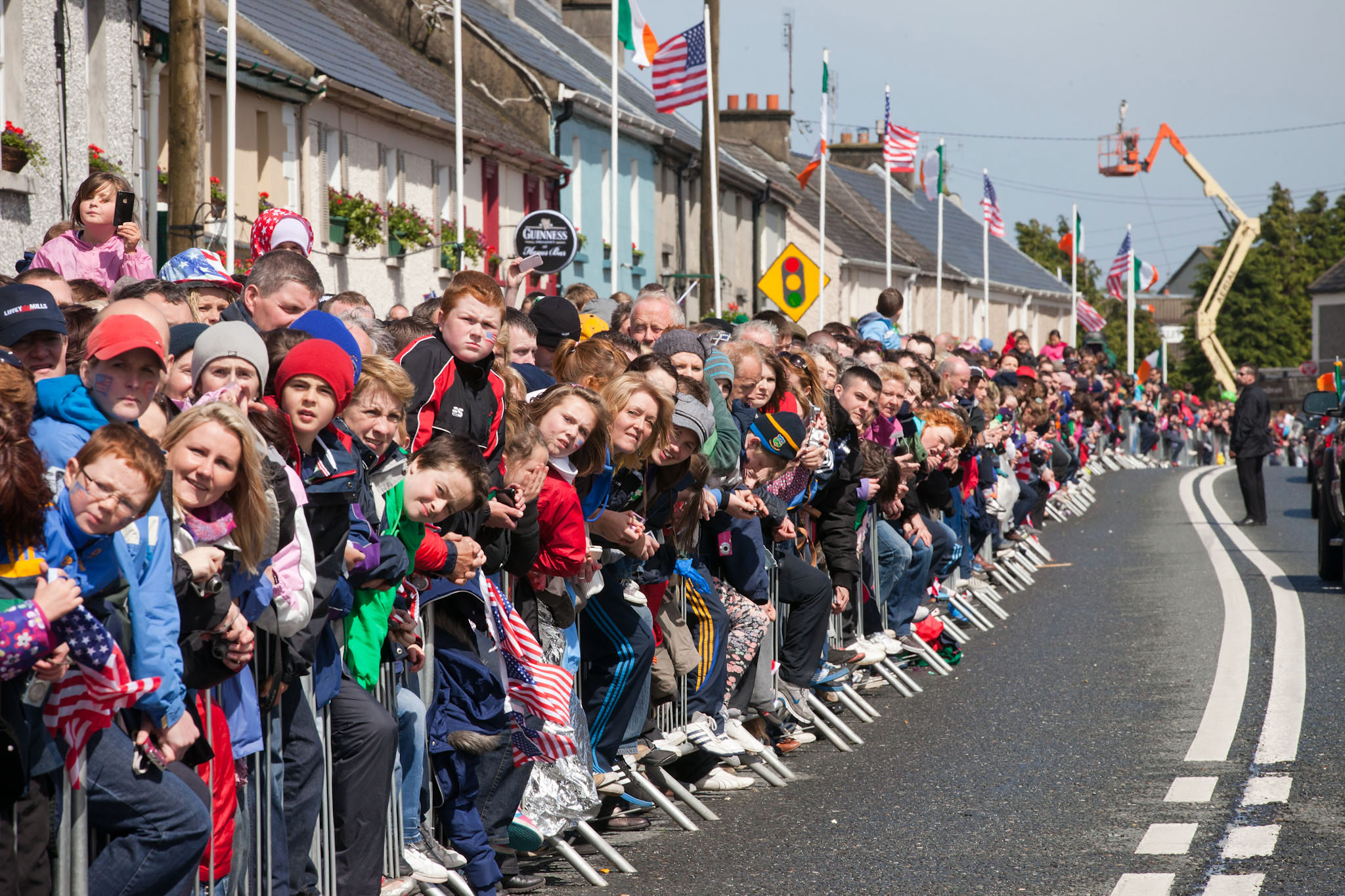
A large crowd watches President Obama's approach

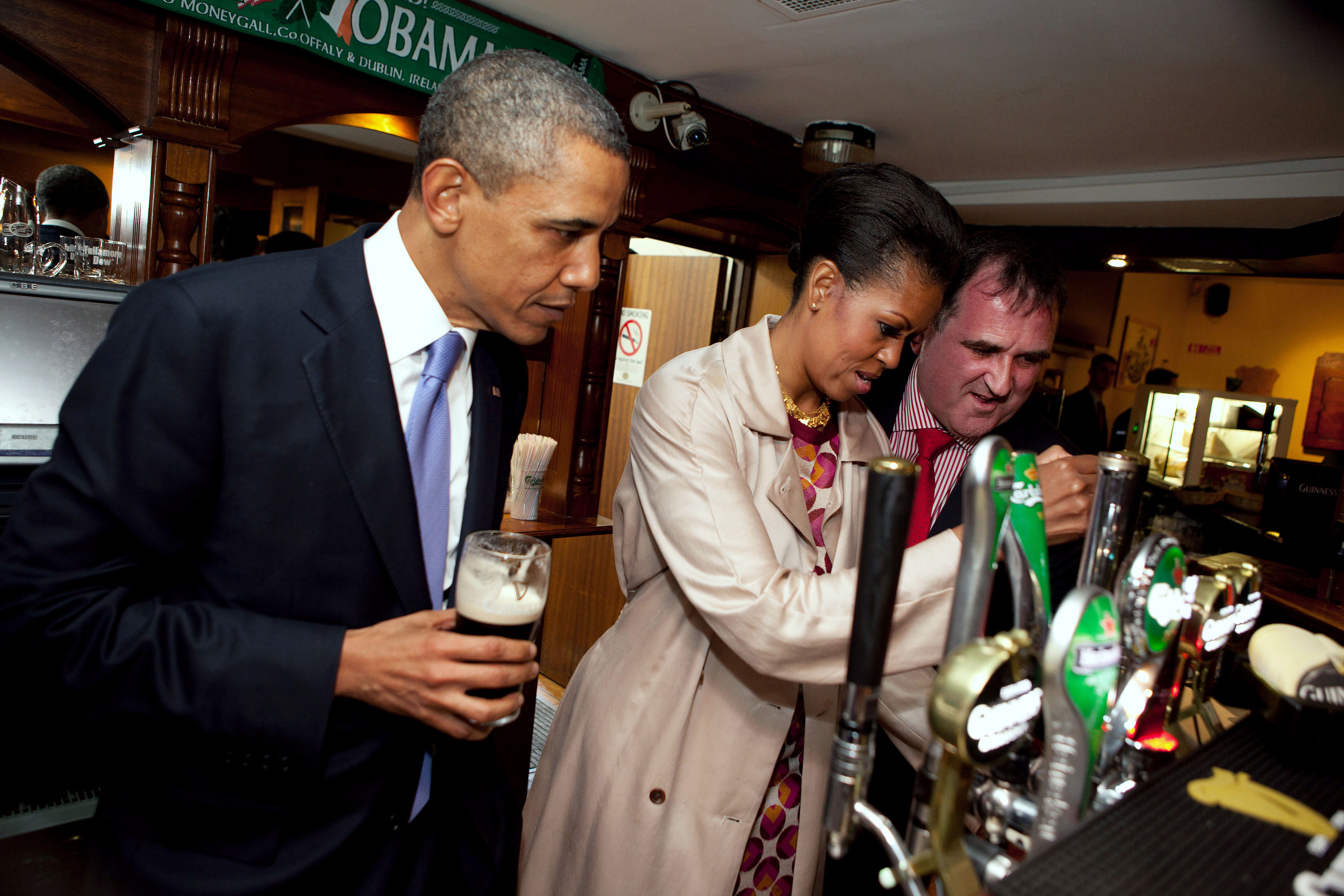
Michelle Obama pours a pint of stout

== Notable people ==
- Patrick Cronin (1913–1991), priest, Archbishop of Cagayan de Oro from 1970 to 1988
- Séamus Ó Riain (1916–2007), president of the GAA from 1967 until 1970
- Joseph Prosser (1828–1867), recipient of the Victoria Cross
- Nell Hynes (1916–2026), Ireland's oldest woman at the time of death.

== See also ==
- List of towns and villages in Ireland
- Irish immigration to the United States
