= Dunkerrin =

Dunkerrin Dún Cairin
- Village
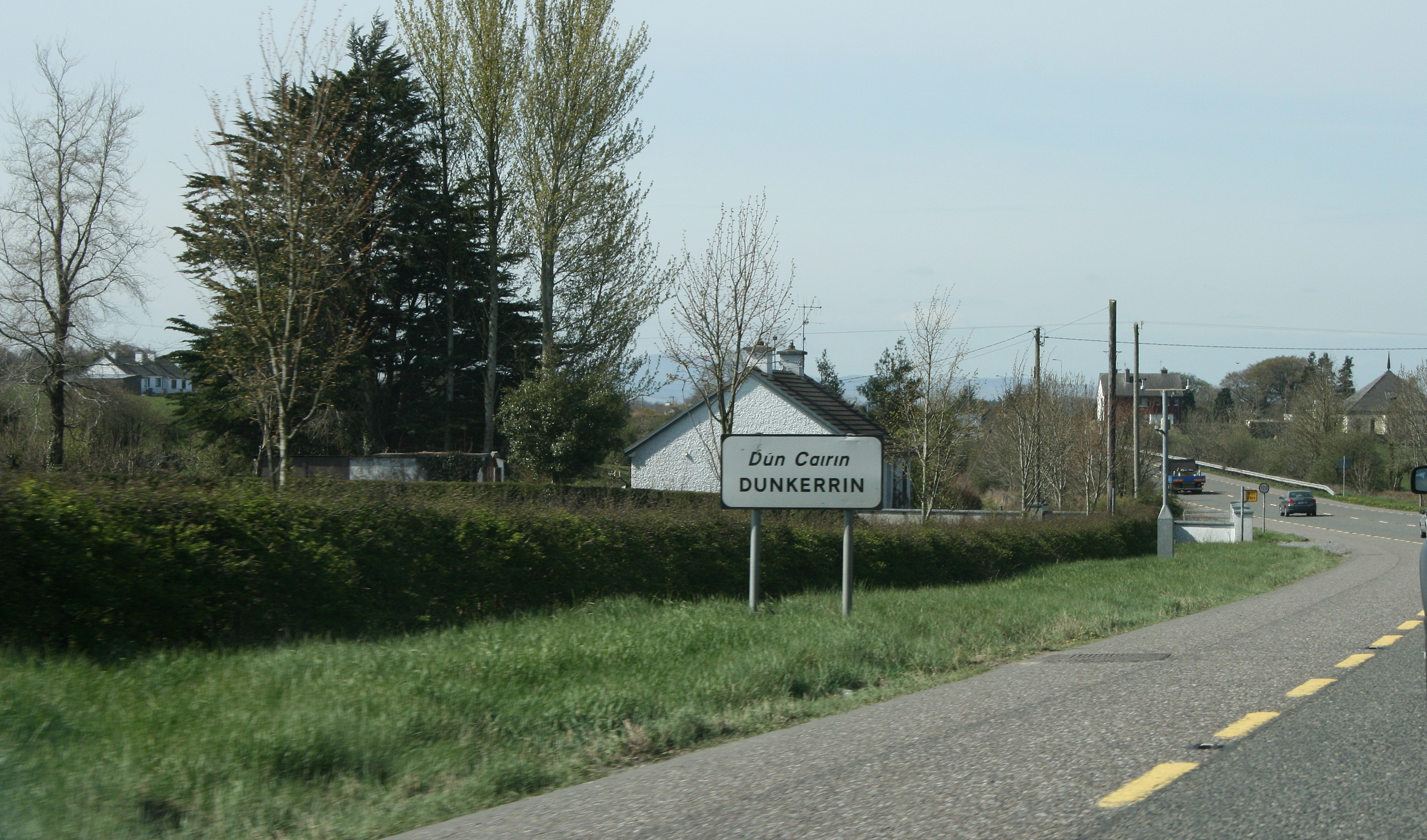
- Road signage on the R445 near Dunkerrin

- Location in Ireland
- Coordinates: 52°55′N 7°55′W
- Country: Ireland
- Province: Leinster
- County: Offaly
- Time zone: UTC+0 (WET)
  - Summer (DST): UTC-1 (IST (WEST))

Dunkerrin (Irish: Dún Cairin) is a small village in County Offaly, Ireland, just south of Roscrea and near the County Tipperary border. It is on the R445 road which was once the main road from Dublin to Limerick. Dunkerrin is now bypassed by the M7 motorway, the nearest access is junction 23 at Moneygall. The village is in a civil parish of the same name.

== Amenities ==
The local national (primary) school, Scoil Muire, first opened in 1943. The village's Roman Catholic church, dedicated to St Mary, was built in 1978 on the site of an earlier 19th-century church.

== Structures of note ==
Local sites of architectural note include the remains of Franckfort Castle, which was built about 1730. Though now demolished, the ruined remains include a Gothic style curtain wall, entrance and towers.

The construction of Dunkerrin's Church of Ireland church was funded by the 'Board of First Fruits' and completed c. 1820. It is a four-bay nave church with a three-stage tower. A stile in the stone boundary wall which encloses the church yard provides access to Frankfort Castle. A wall plaque reads, 'This wall was built by Francis Rollestown Esq. In the year 1757’.

There is a late 19th-century cast-iron water pump at the crossroads in Dunkerrin.
