= Supermac's =

Irish fast food chain

Supermac's Ireland Limited
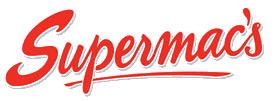

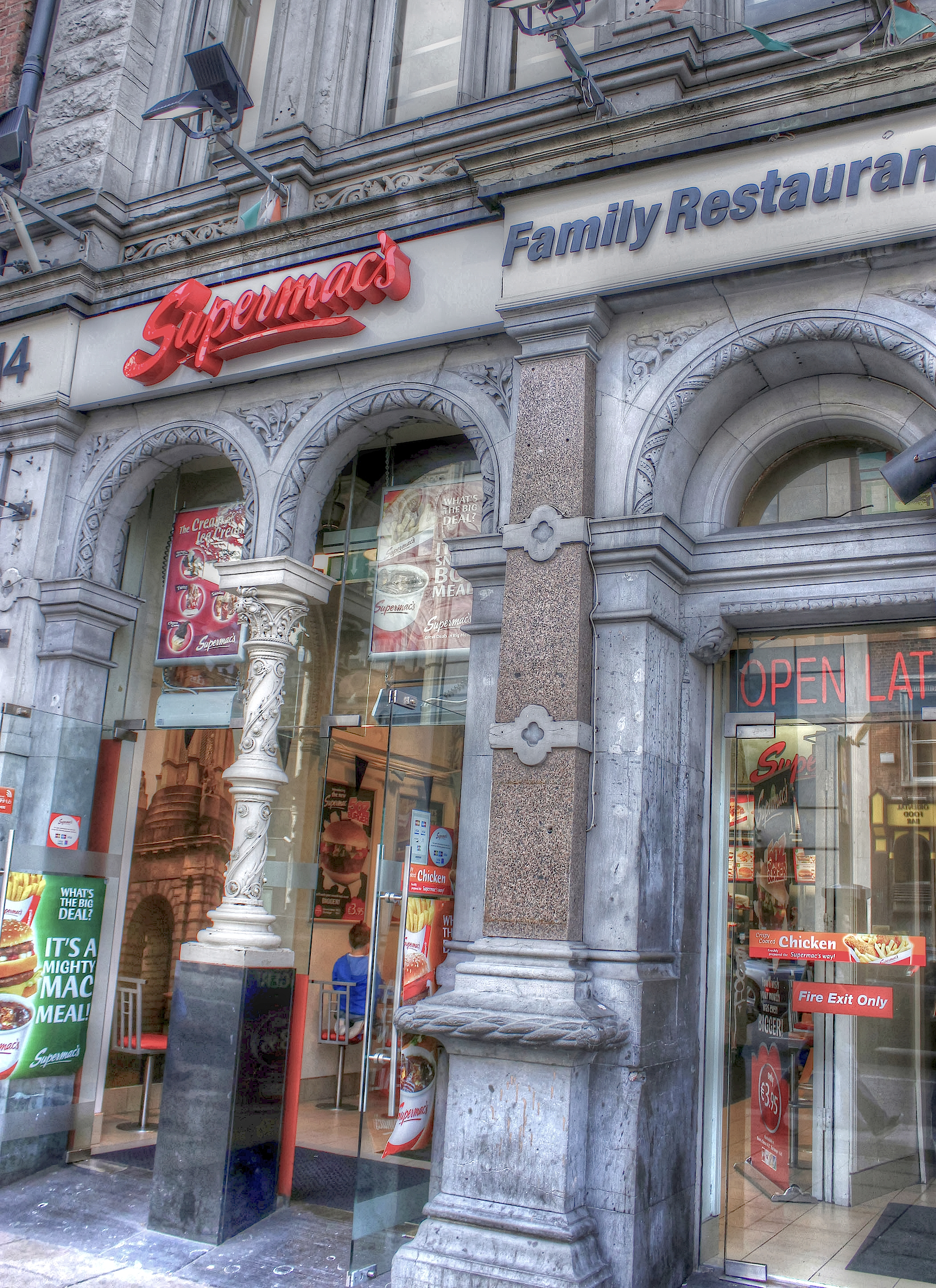
- Supermac's on Westmoreland Street, Dublin
- Type: Private
- Industry: Fast food Franchise
- Founded: 1978; 48 years ago in Ballinasloe, County Galway, Republic of Ireland
- Founder: Pat McDonagh
- Headquarters: Ballybrit Business Park, Galway, Republic of Ireland
- Number of locations: 118 (2019)
- Area served: Republic of Ireland
- Key people: Pat McDonagh (CEO)
- Products: Fast food
- Revenue: €79.9 million (2013); €72.6m (2012)
- Operating income: €7.1m (2013)
- Net income: €6.7m (2013)
- Total assets: €53.5m (2013); €46.7m (2012)
- Total equity: €53.4m (2013)
- Owner: Pat McDonagh and family
- Number of employees: 4,000+ (2020)
- Website: supermacs.ie

Supermac's Ireland Limited is an Irish fast food restaurant chain that first opened in 1978. The first restaurant was located in Ballinasloe, County Galway, Ireland. As of 2019, the chain consists of 118 restaurants spread throughout the island of Ireland. It operates a number of franchise outlets with many also privately owned. Supermac's serves an average of 320,000 customers per week and had annual revenues of €79.9 million and a profit of €7.4 million according to its 2013 closing report.

Its head office is in the Ballybrit Business Park in Ballybrit, County Galway.

== History ==
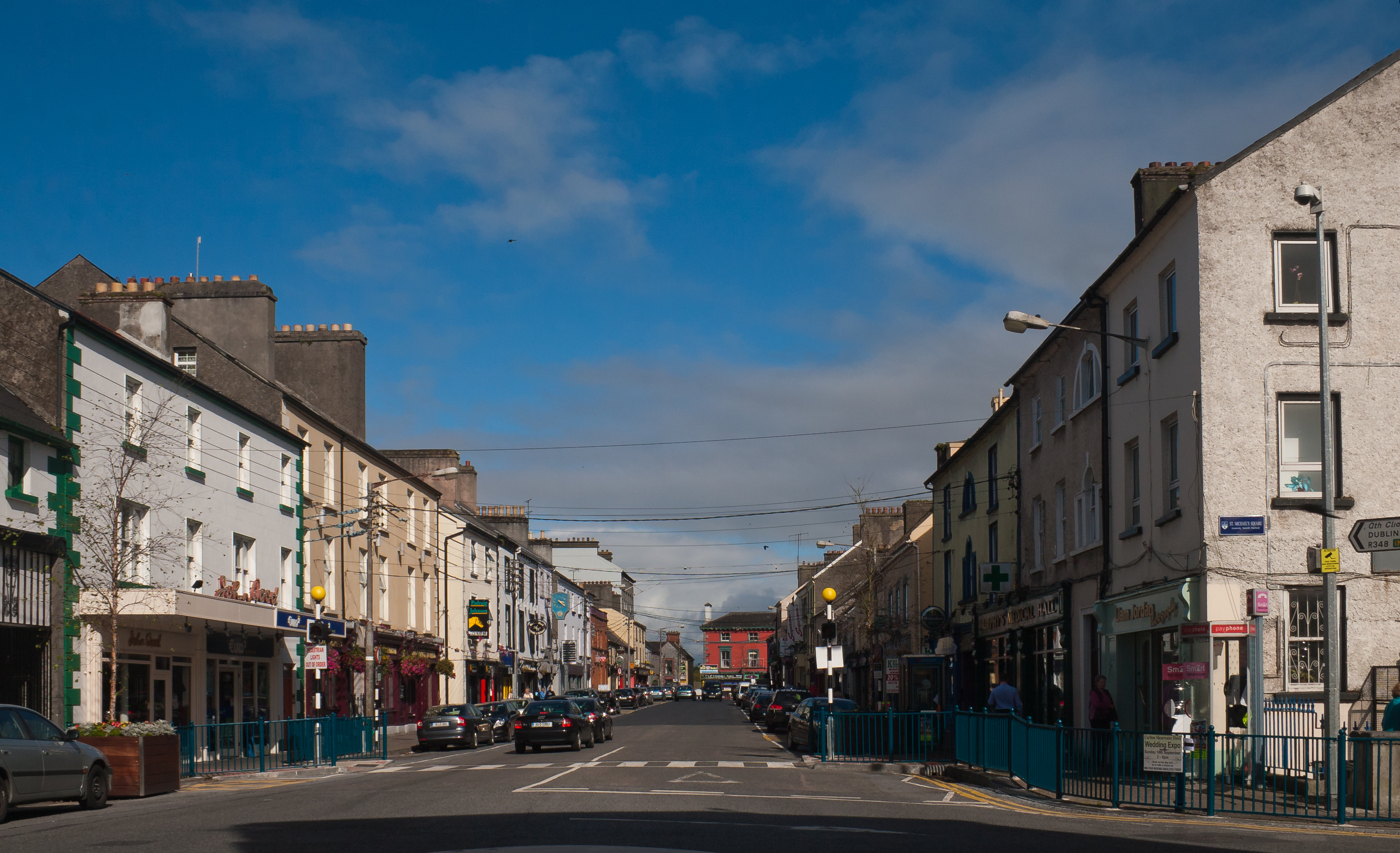
Main Street, Ballinasloe, where the first Supermac's restaurant is located

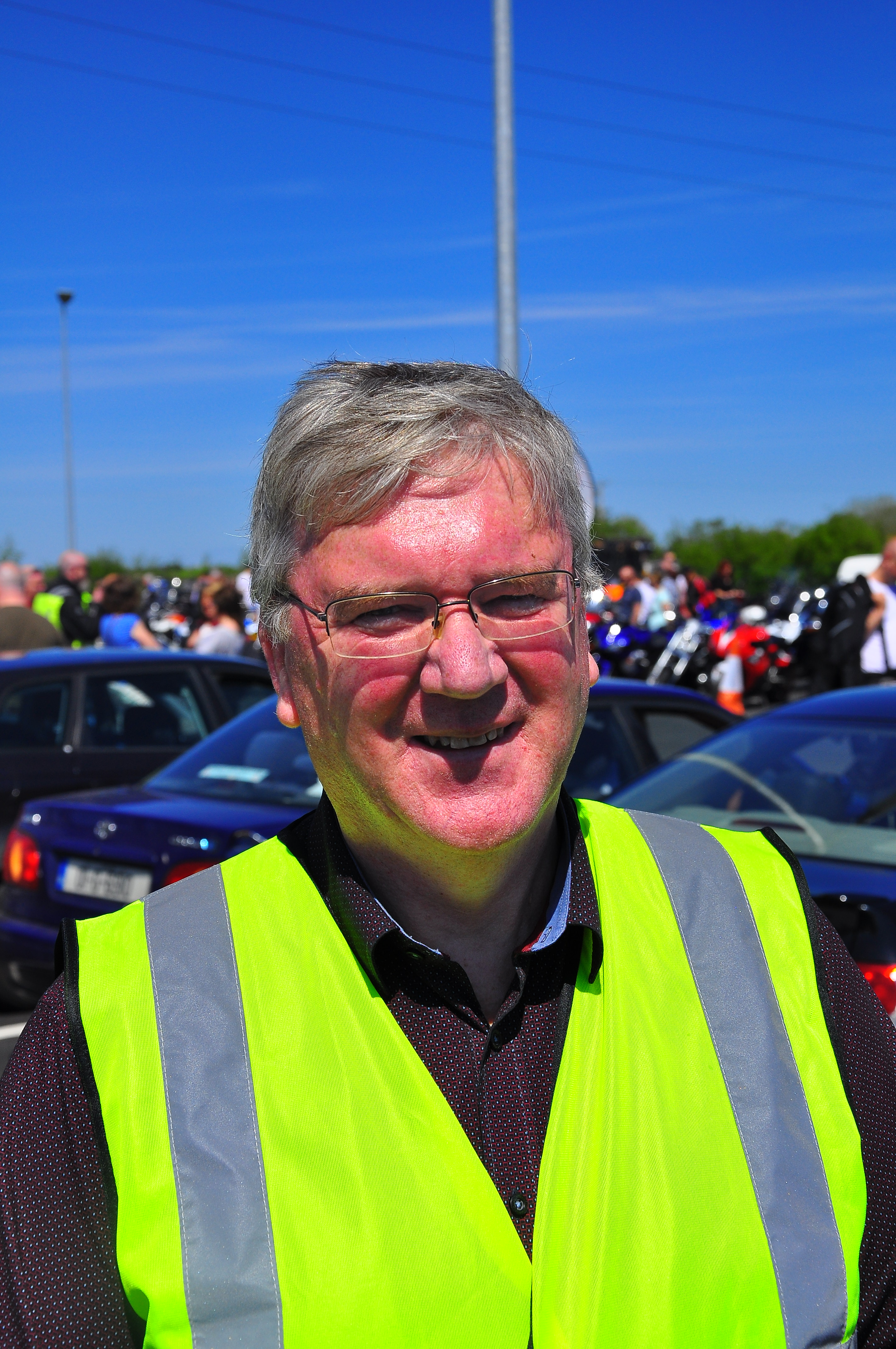
Pat McDonagh in 2016

The first restaurant was opened in Ballinasloe, County Galway, in the West of Ireland in 1978, by Pat and Una McDonagh. A second restaurant opened two years later in Gort, followed by an Eyre Square premises in Galway city which opened in 1982.

As of November 2013, Supermac's was the largest Irish-owned quick service food chain, with over 100 outlets across Ireland. In June 2014, Supermac's opened its 100th store in the Barack Obama Plaza on the M7 Motorway. Supermac's also exclusively operates the Papa Johns brand in the island of Ireland as well as SuperSubs, which replaces the Quiznos franchise that Supermac's formerly held. The company employed over 4,000 people as of 2020.

== Corporate overview ==
=== Name ===
The Restaurant was named together by locals and its owners: The founder, Pat McDonagh, earned the nickname 'Supermac' whilst playing Gaelic football for the Carmelite College in Moate. This then became the choice of name for his business, "Supermac's".

=== Operations ===
Through Supermac's Ireland Ltd, Pat and Una McDonagh also own Claddagh Irish Pubs & Restaurants, a chain of eleven Irish-themed bars and restaurants operating in eight Midwestern states in the United States.

Supermac's is Ireland's largest indigenous quick service restaurant group. Supermac's Holdings Ltd. has applied to trademark the Supermac's name in both Europe and Australia with McDonagh stating, in 2015, that he was planning on "responding to demands coming from fifteen cities internationally for the opening of Supermac's restaurants".

In 2013, the company expanded its motor services business by developing the Tipperary Town Plaza and Mallow N20 Plaza on national primary routes. The company opened another plaza in Kiltullagh, County Galway at the M6 Loughrea Junction in February 2016.

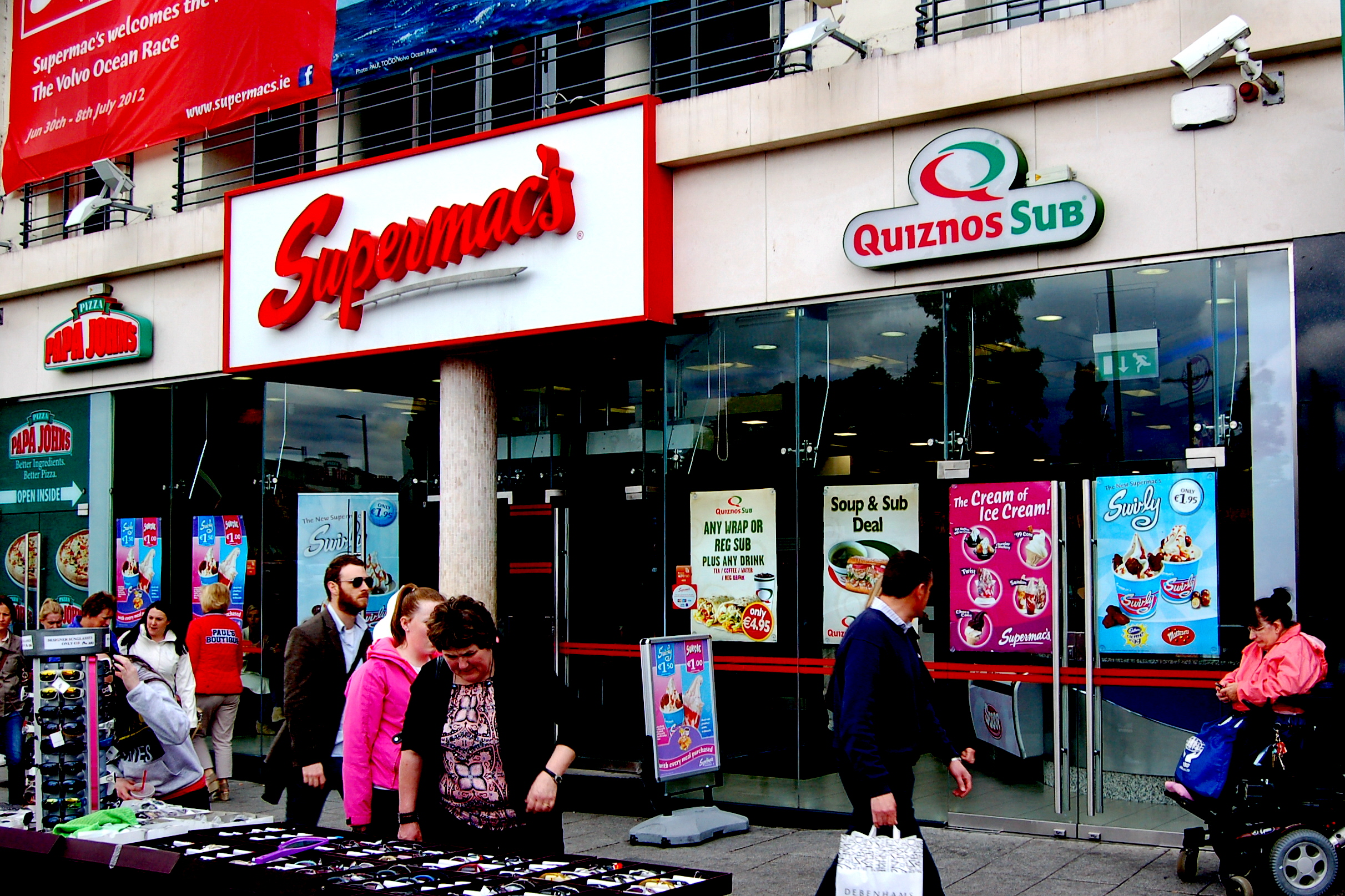
Supermac's in Galway's Eyre Square

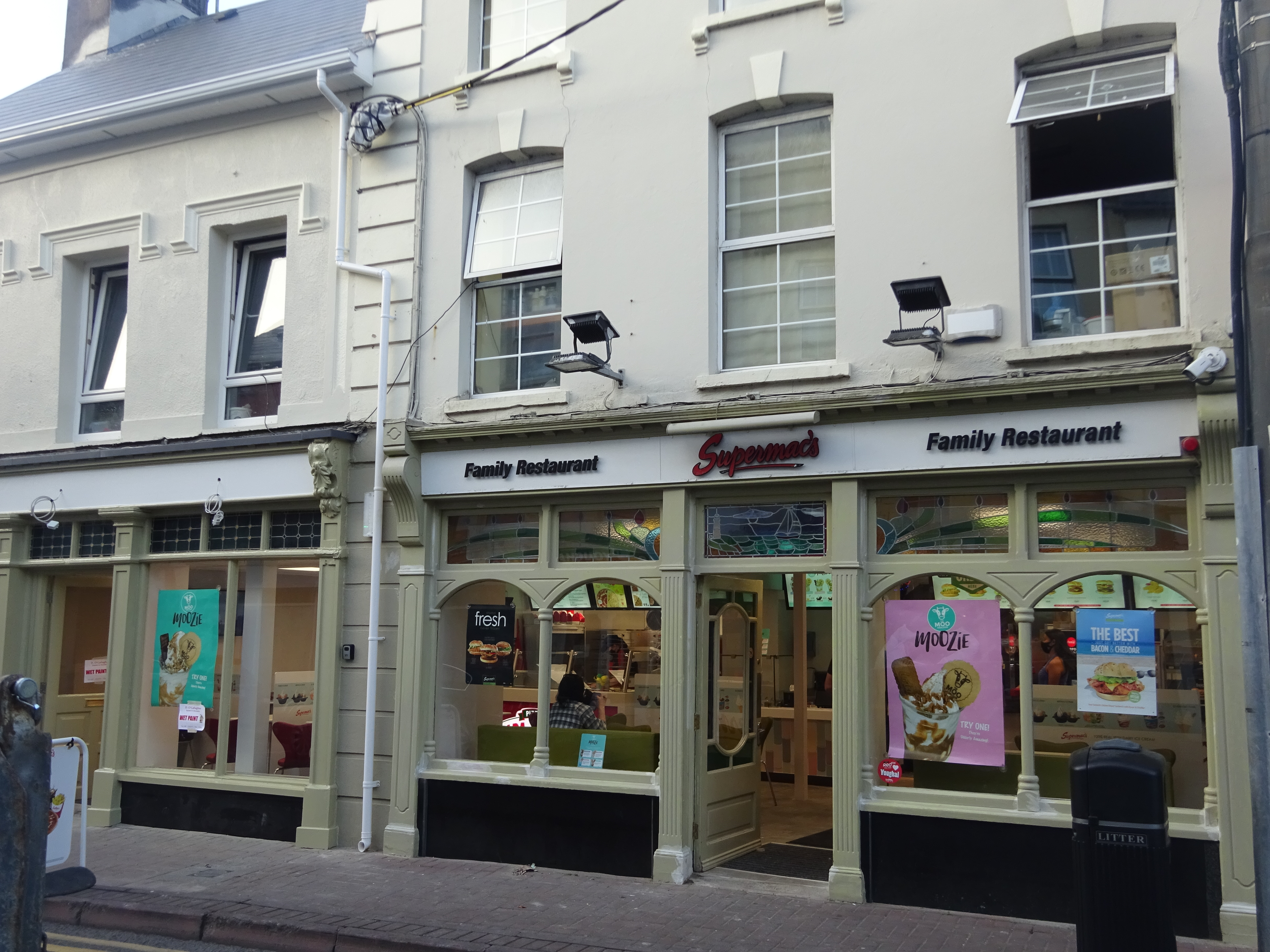
Supermac's in Youghal

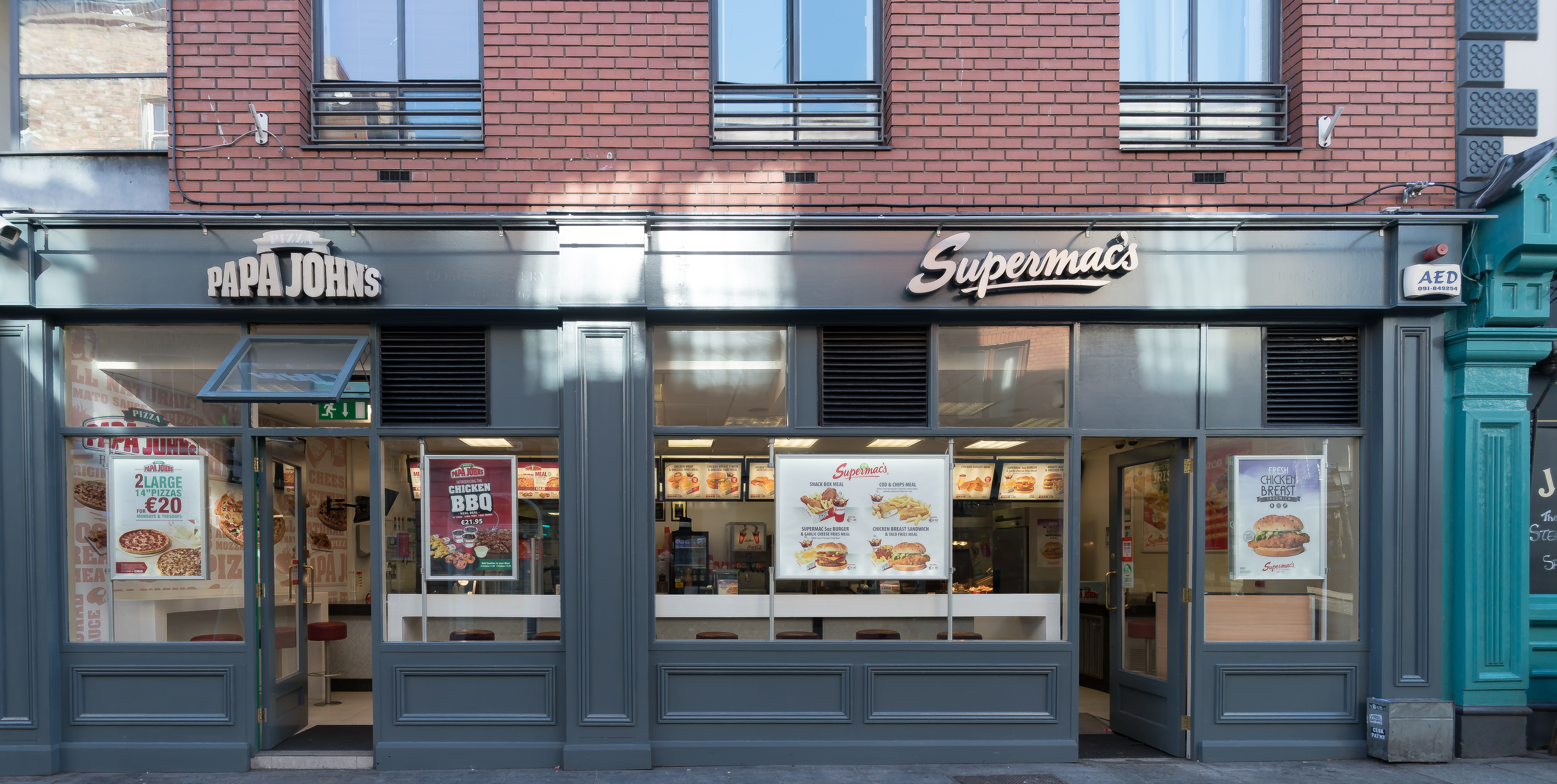
Supermac's in Temple Bar, Dublin

=== Super VIP Card ===
Galway actress Nicola Coughlan revealed in May 2025 that she had received a Supermac’s Super VIP card. The card states it was issued in October 2024 and is valid for life, noting she is also known as two characters she has played: Clare Devlin in Derry Girls and Lady Whistledown in Bridgerton. The card entitles the bearer to free meals and special perks.

In March 2026, influencer Garron Noone became the second known person to receive the Supermac's Super VIP card.

=== Hotels ===
The company has also expanded its hospitality business interests through the purchase and development of the Castletroy Park Hotel, Limerick, Loughrea Hotel & Spa, Galway, Charleville Park Hotel, Cork, The Killeshin Hotel, Portlaoise, Castle Oaks House Hotel, Limerick and Athlone Springs Hotel, Monksland

== Advertising ==
Supermac's initiated the "Bring them Home" campaign where they reunited families, whose relatives were living around the world, for Christmas. Between 2012 and 2013 Supermac's flew 43 people who had emigrated from Ireland during the economic recession to locations worldwide back to Ireland to be with their families and friends over the festive season. The campaign was promoted on 2FM's Tubridy Show and through RTÉ One's The Late Late Show, where the winners surprised their families by being reunited live on air during Christmas week. In 2014, Supermac's campaign appeared in Times Square (7th Avenue) in New York City.

In 2012, the chain was included in a list of "10 fast-food restaurants you haven't heard of" by the Daily Meal programme on Fox News, while USA Today included Supermac's in a list of "Top Foreign Chains we want to move Stateside" in 2013.

=== Sponsorship ===
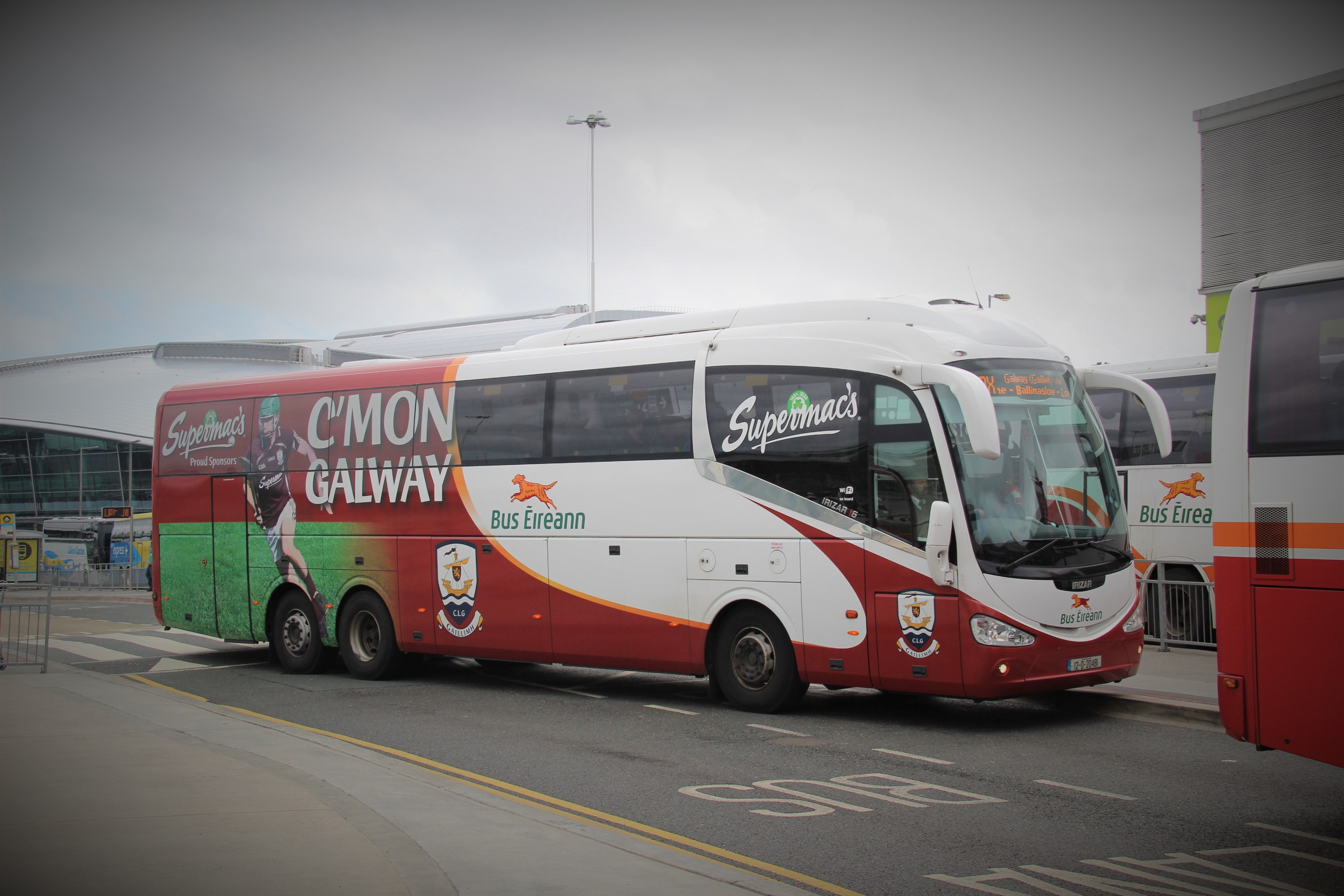
Supermac's Galway hurling sponsorship on a Bus Éireann bus in 2023

Supermac's sponsors a number of sporting organisations. As of 2018, the company's association with Galway hurling was one of the longest running inter-county GAA sponsorships in the country, then in its twenty eighth year. In 2013, a deal was signed seeing both hurling and football in Galway sponsored by one organisation for the first time. The deal included sponsorship of Galway football and hurling across all age groups from under age through to senior. As of 2013, Supermac's had provided over €2 million to Galway's GAA county board.

The company also engages with other sports sponsorships such as rugby, soccer, international rules football (2005) and horseracing (Limerick, Ballinrobe races).

Other Supermac's sponsorships include The Ray Foley Show on Today FM from 2010 to 2012, and The Will Leahy Show on RTÉ 2fm from 2012 to 2014.

The restaurant chain also sponsored the Volvo Ocean Race 2009 and 2012 during the Galway leg of the race. Supermac's was also a sponsor of Cannonball Ireland in 2012 and 2014.

== EU trademarks case ==
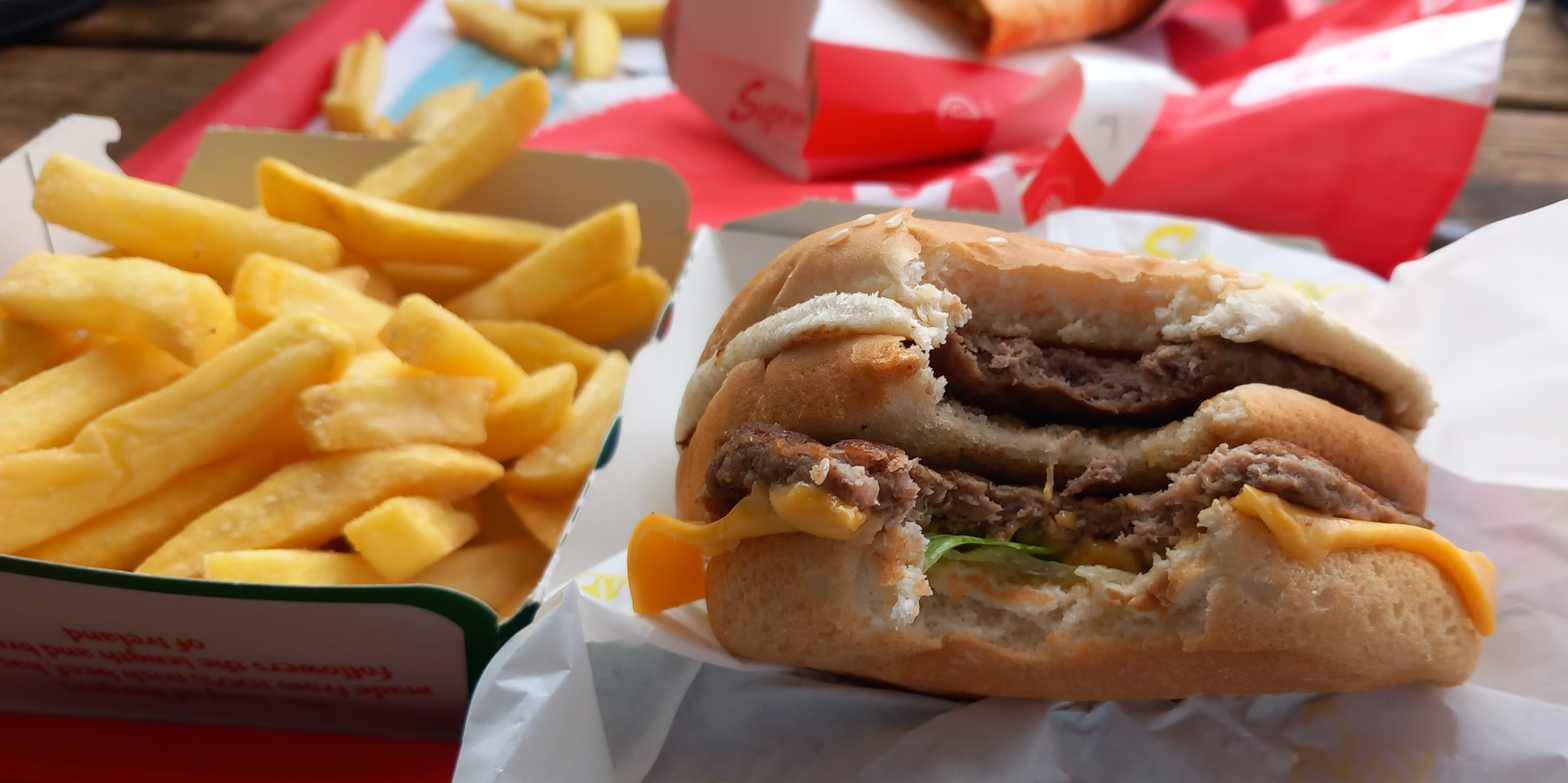
McDonald's claimed the name Supermac's and menu items, such as the Mighty Mac burger, infringed on the Big Mac trademark

In 2017, McDonald's objected to Supermac's registering its name and certain of its product names as trademarks throughout the European Union (EU) for the purpose of expanding outside of Ireland. McDonald's argued that the Supermac's name is visually similar to McDonald's, while Supermac's argued that it has traded alongside McDonald's in Ireland since 1978 without confusion. McDonald's won a partial victory, with the EU's Office for Harmonisation in the Internal Market (OHIM) ruling that Supermac's could trade under its own name in the EU, but it rejected Supermac's trademark applications for several items, including menu items. It said that consumers could "be confused as to whether Supermac's is a new version of McDonald's", given the almost identical products sold by both chains.

Supermac's, in turn, challenged McDonald's right to hold certain trademarks registered by it in the EU. In January 2019, the EUIPO ruled that certain trademarks owned by McDonald's, including Big Mac, were to be revoked. In 2023, the EUIPO Board of Appeals partially reversed the decision revoking McDonald's trademarks, permitting McDonald's to continue to use the trademark for poultry products and restaurants, but also permitting Supermac's to use the Big Mac name on its own food products.

Supermac's appealed the EUIPO's decision to the European Court of Justice. On 5 June 2024, the court held that McDonald's had failed to prove use of the Big Mac trademark in relation to chicken products or in relation to services associated with operating restaurants, meaning Supermac's and other businesses are now free to use the "Mac" in their business names and in names for poultry products in Europe. McDonald's retains the Big Mac trademark for its beef burgers only.

In June 2025, it was reported that McDonald's was attempting to block the expansion of Supermac's into the Great Britain market and intended to proceed with IPO trademark court proceedings in the United Kingdom, despite having been unsuccessful in the EU proceedings in 2024.

== Charity ==
Supermac's has donated money to charities such as Trócaire and to local charities including Alan Kerrins African Projects. It has also hosted charity events in its outlets such as Today FM's Shave or Dye.

== See also ==
- List of hamburger restaurants
- List of Irish companies
