= Slate River (Ireland) =

Coordinates: 53.1936°N 7.0891°W

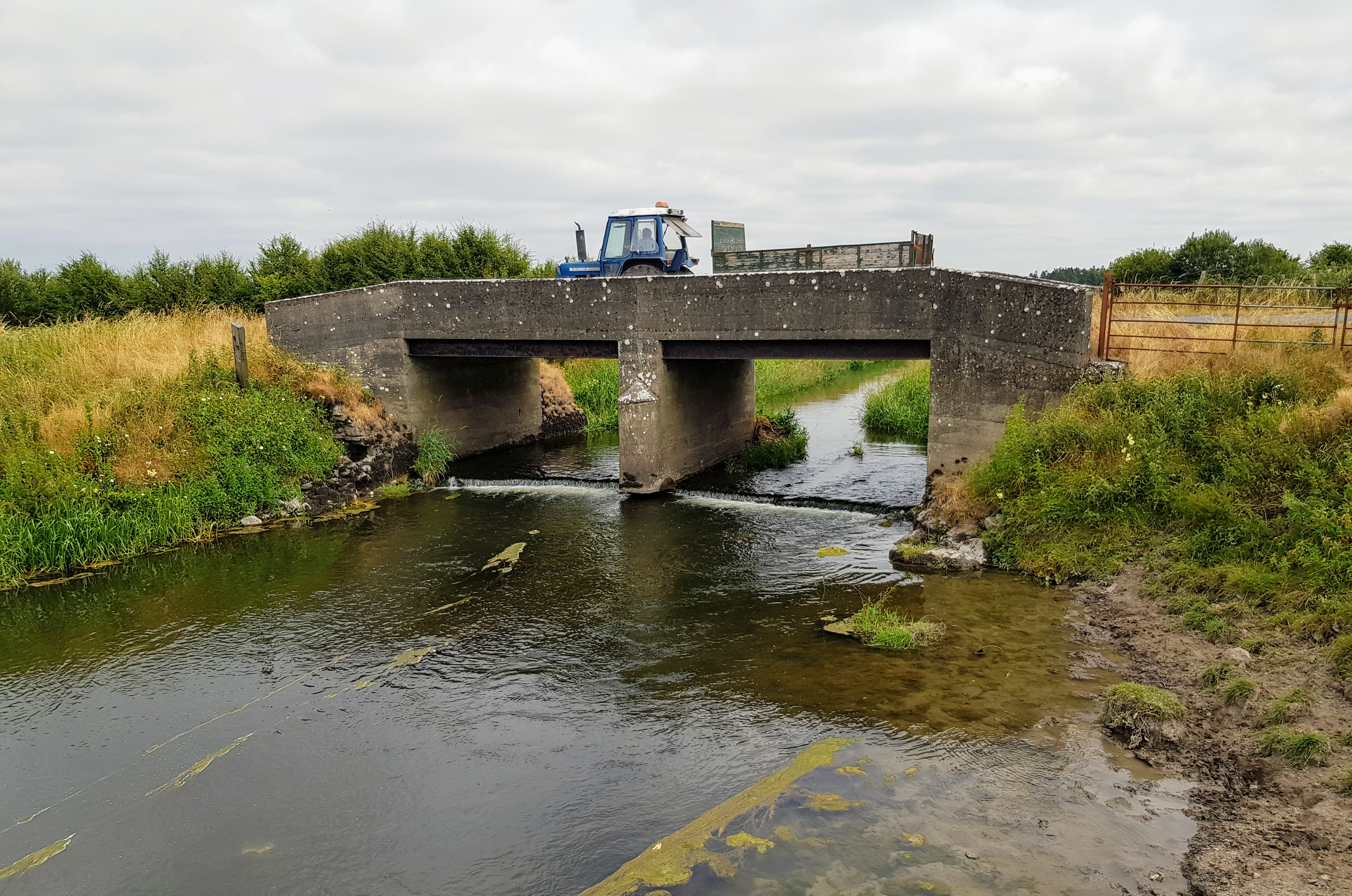
- Native name: An Tarae (Irish)

Location
- Country: Ireland

Physical characteristics
- Source
  - location: Ballynafagh Lake, County Kildare
  - elevation: 86 m (282 ft)
- Mouth: River Figile
  - location: Bracknagh, County Offaly
- Discharge
  - average: 0.037 m^{3}/s (1.3 cu ft/s)

The Slate River (Irish: An Tarae) or River Slate is a river in County Kildare and County Offaly, Ireland, a tributary of the Figile River.

== Name ==
Its name derives from the slate quarries in the region. The Irish language name derives from tarae, meaning mill race, referring to Sally Corn Mill, Rathangan.

The river was historically known as the Clashaghbane River.

== Course ==
Slate River rises near Ballynafagh Lake in Prosperous and flows southwest, passing under the R403 road at Graigues. It continues westward parallel to, and north of, the Grand Canal. The Slate passes under the Grand Canal via the Derrymullen aqueduct and is bridged by the R415 at Littletown. The Slate River continues through Ballyteague Forest and passes by the Lullymore Heritage and Discovery Park on the Bog of Allen. It passes through Rathangan, County Kildare where it passes under Rathangan Bridge, part of the R401. There is also a footbridge downstream of this bridge, and another bridge (for the R414) at Rathangan Demesne.

The Slate River continues westward, passing into County Offaly and draining into the Figile River just south of Bracknagh.

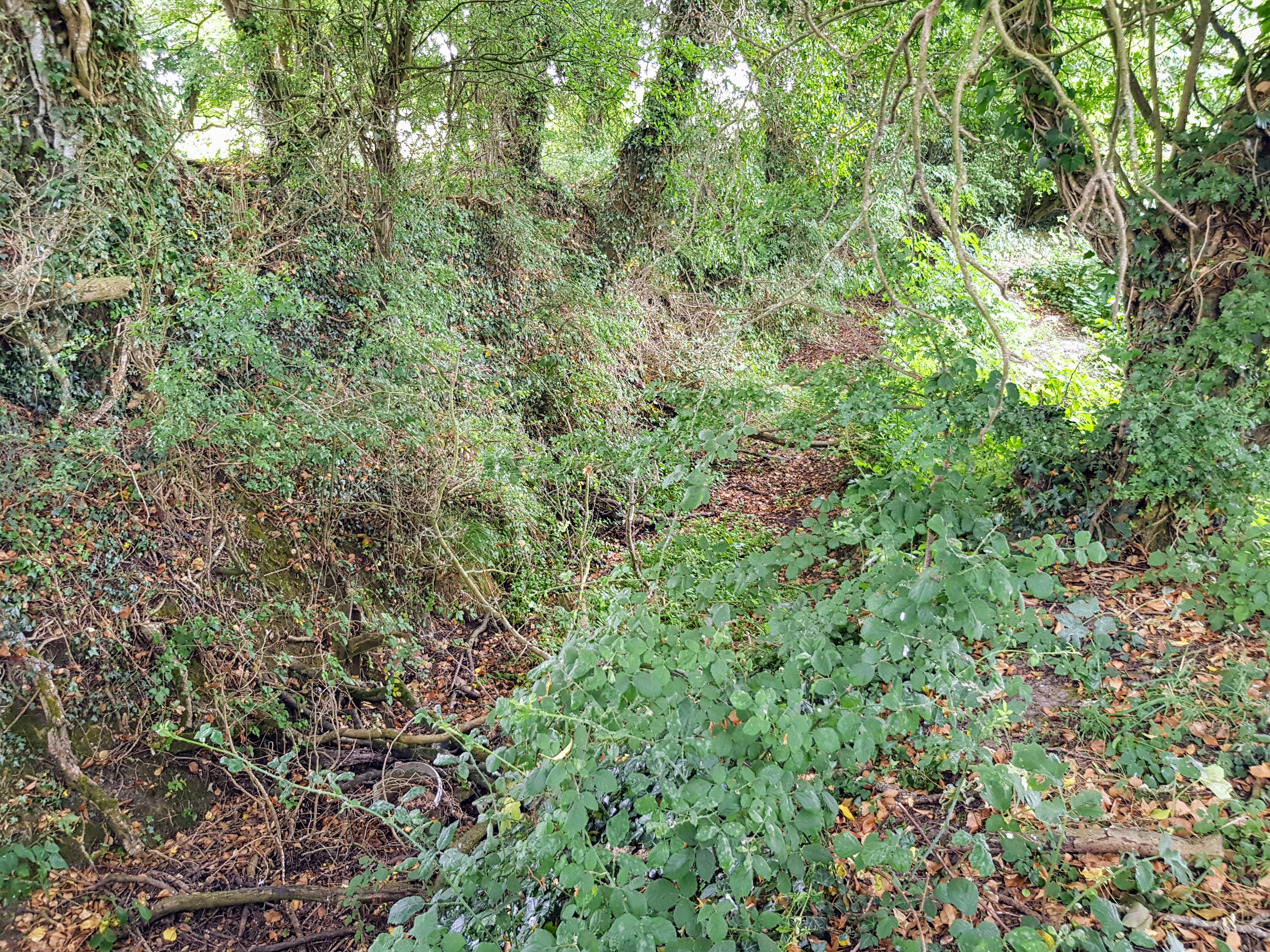
The source of the Slate River

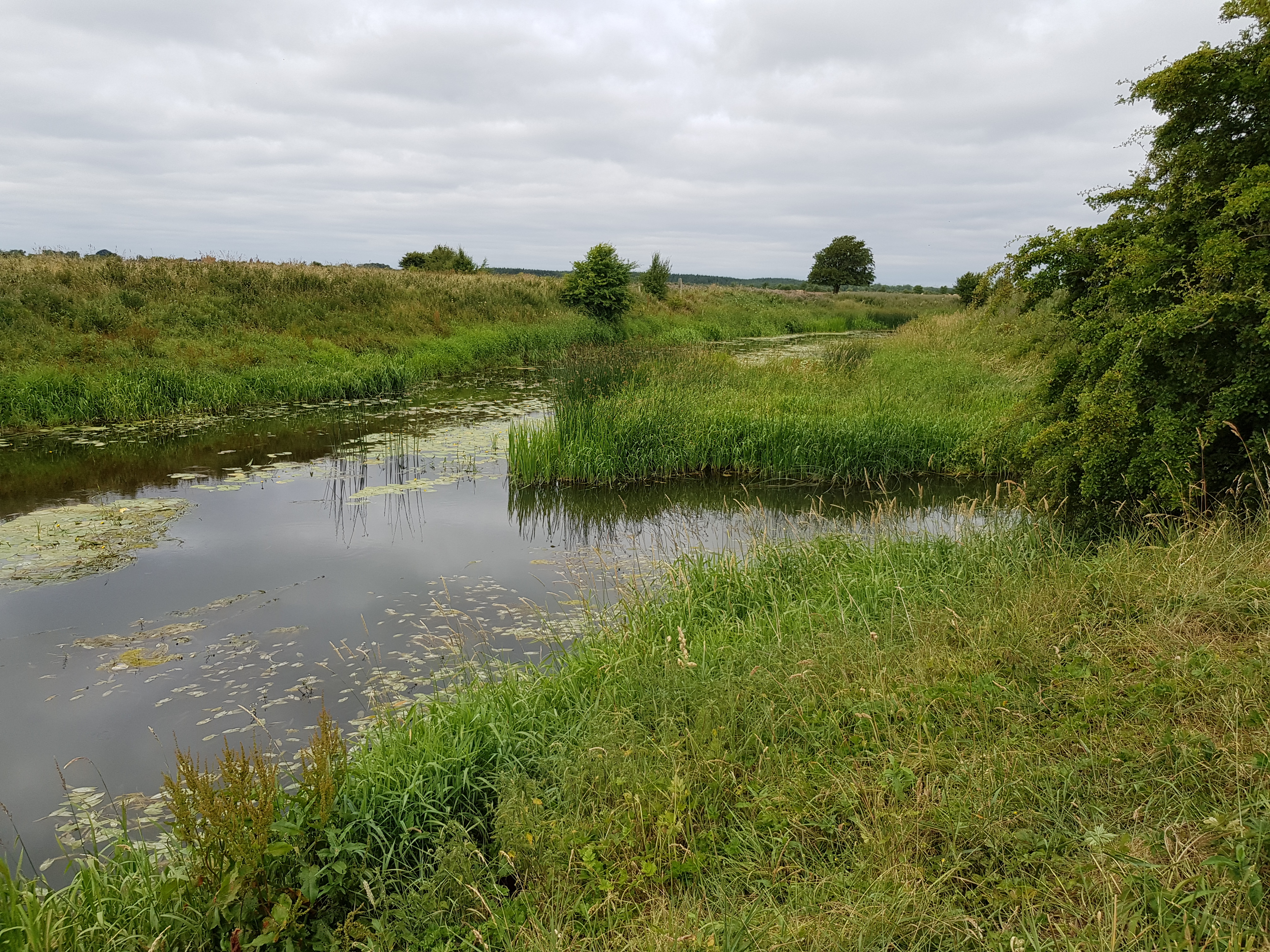
The mouth of the Slate River

== Wildlife ==
Northern pike, European perch and brown trout are common.

== See also ==
- Rivers of Ireland
