= Offaly (disambiguation) =

Offaly may refer to:

- County Offaly, Ireland, formerly called King's County
  - Offaly (Dáil constituency)
  - King's County (Parliament of Ireland constituency)
  - King's County (UK Parliament constituency)
  - Offaly GAA
- A historic region of County Kildare, divided into the baronies of Offaly West and Offaly East
- The medieval Kingdom of Uí Failghe

== See also ==
- Offley, in England
