= Civic consumption =

Model for social change

Civic consumption is a model for social change that leverages shared buying power to reward socially responsible businesses. The model operates by gathering groups of consumers to leverage the group's size in order to expand access to a particular good or service.

== History ==
The term first appeared in 2013, in a Fast Company article featuring Groundswell co-founder, Will Byrne. The model has been used in the clean energy sector by Groundswell. The model has expanded to increasingly include hybrid organizations.

In 2013, Groundswell launched the Civic Consumption Network.

== See also ==
- Collective buying power
- Group purchasing organization
