= R442 road (Ireland) =

Road in Ireland

Coordinates: 53.223798°N 7.101123°W

R442 road
- Bóthar R442
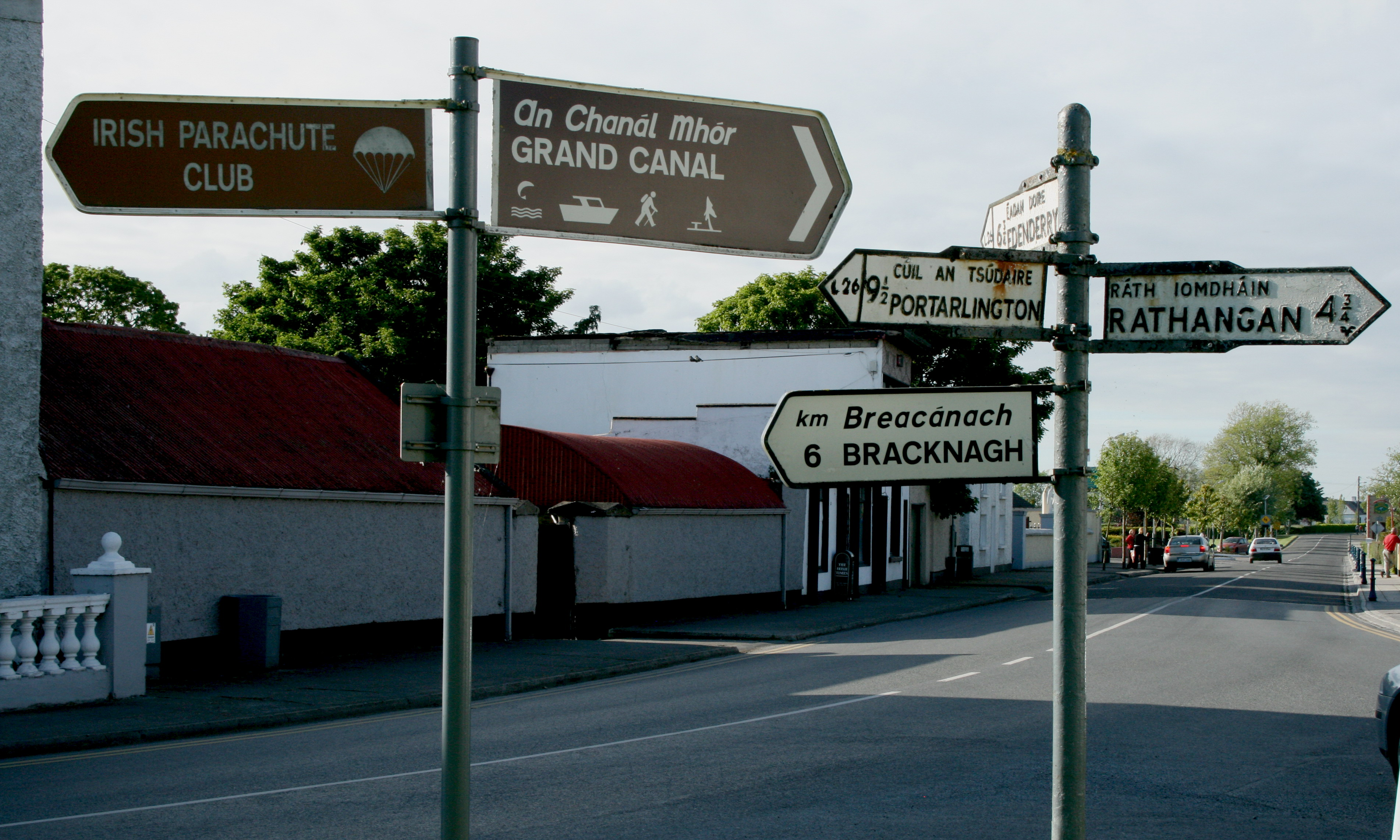
- Start of the R442 to Bracknagh at the R401 in Clonbullogue

Route information
- Length: 6.1 km (3.8 mi)

Major junctions
- From: R401 Clonbollogue
- Crosses River Figile
- To: R419 Bracknagh

Location
- Country: Ireland

Highway system
- Roads in Ireland; Motorways; Primary; Secondary; Regional

The R442 road is a regional road in Ireland, located in County Offaly.
