= William Byrne =

William, Bill or Billy Byrne may refer to:

- William Byrne (boxer), former boxer from New Zealand
- William Byrne (Catholic) (1780–1833), Irish missionary and educator
- William Byrne (engraver) (1743–1805), British artist
- William Byrne (painter) (1906–1997), American painter
- William Byrne (priest), Irish priest
- William A. Byrne (1872–1933), Irish poet and educator
- William D. Byrne Jr., United States Navy admiral
- William Draper Byrne (born 1964), Roman Catholic bishop of Springfield, Massachusetts, United States
- William Henry Byrne (1844–1917), Irish architect
- William Matthew Byrne Sr. (1896–1974), American judge
- William Matthew Byrne Jr. (1930–2006), American judge, and son of William Matthew Byrne Sr
- William Michael Byrne (1775–1798), Irish revolutionary
- William Patrick Byrne (1859–1935), member of the British Civil Service
- William Pitt Byrne (1806–1861), British newspaper editor and proprietor of The Morning Post
- William T. Byrne (1876–1952), American politician in New York
- Bill Byrne (American football) (1940–2021), American football player
- Bill Byrne (athletic director), American collegiate athletic director
- Bill Byrne (footballer, born 1896) (1896–1930), Australian footballer for Fitzroy
- Bill Byrne (footballer, born 1931) (1931–2020), Australian footballer for Melbourne
- Bill Byrne (politician) (born 1958), Member of the Queensland Parliament
- Bill Byrne (sports entrepreneur) (1936–2007), founder of the first women's professional basketball league
- Billy Byrne (footballer) (1918–2001), English footballer
- Billy Byrne (hurler) (born 1960), Irish retired hurler

== See also ==
- William O'Byrne (1908–1951), English cricketer
- William Richard O'Byrne (1823–1896), Irish biographer and politician
- Will Byrne, American activist and entrepreneur
- William Burn (disambiguation)
- William Burns (disambiguation)
