= Bill Burns =

Bill Burns may refer to:

- Bill Burns (anchor) (1913–1997), American news anchor
- Bill Burns (artist) (born 1957), Canadian artist
- Bill Burns (Australian politician) (1933–2009), member of the Australian House of Representatives
- Bill Burns (baseball) (1880–1953), American baseball pitcher involved in the Black Sox scandal
- Bill Burns (footballer) (1884–1955), Richmond and East Fremantle player

== See also ==
- Billy Burns (disambiguation)
- William Burns (disambiguation)
- Bill Byrne (athletic director), American athletic director
