= R401 road (Ireland) =

Road in Ireland

R401 road
- Bóthar R401
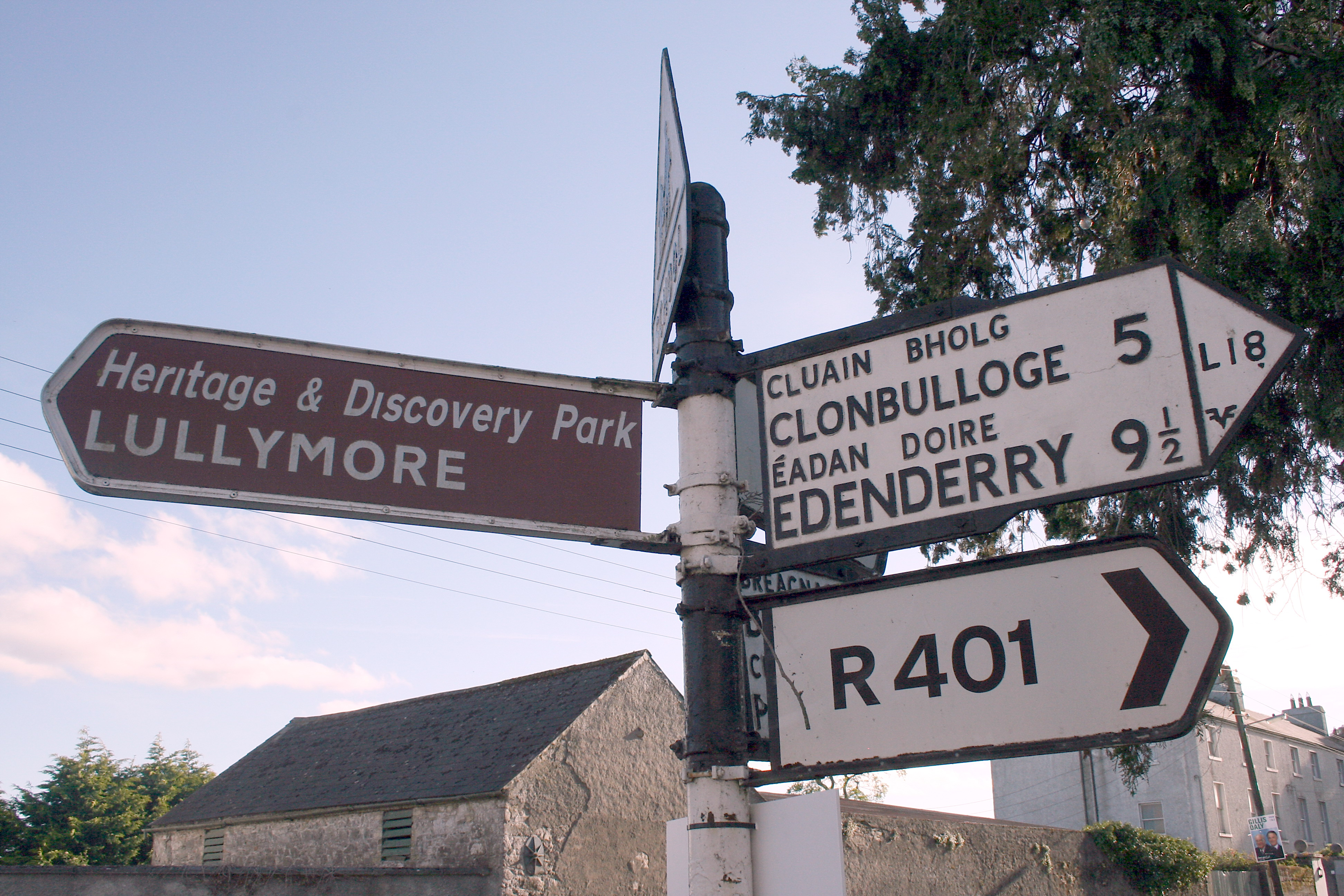
- Old signs on the R401 in Rathangan show distances in miles and the old route number, "L18"

Route information
- Length: 42.3 km (26.3 mi)

Location
- Country: Ireland
- Primary destinations: County Kildare; Kildare – leaves the R445 (former old N7) and crosses the Dublin-Cork railway line in the town; Rathangan – Joins the R414; crosses the Grand Canal (Barrow Line) and the Slate River; leaves the R414; (R419); County Offaly; Clonbulloge – (R442); Crosses the Figile River; Crosses the Grand Canal; Edenderry – (R441); joins/leaves R402; County Kildare; Crosses the River Boyne; County Meath; Kinnegad – Crosses the M4 motorway at restricted access junction; terminates at the R148

Highway system
- Roads in Ireland; Motorways; Primary; Secondary; Regional

The R401 road is a regional road in Ireland, linking Kinnegad in County Meath to Kildare town in County Kildare.

The total length of the R401 is 42.3 kilometres (26.3 mi).

== Route ==
The official description of the R401 from the Roads Act 1993 (Classification of Regional Roads) Order 2012 reads:

R401: Kinnegad, County Westmeath — Edenderry, County Offaly — Kildare

Between its junction with R148 at Rossan in the county of Meath and its junction with R402 at J.K.L. Street in the town of Edenderry in the county of Offaly via Park in the county of Meath: Ballyboggan Bridge at the boundary between the county of Meath and the county of Kildare: Glynn Cross and Ballygibbon in the county of Kildare: Carrick Road and Saint Conleths Road in the town of Edenderry in the county of Offaly (map of this 15.3 km segment) and between its junction with R402 at Saint Mary's Road in the town of Edenderry in the county of Offaly and its junction with R415 at Station Road in the town of Kildare in the county of Kildare via Drumcooly, Ballykilleen, Clonbullogue and Coolygagan in the county of Offaly: Ballysooghan North; Main Street and Bridge Street at Rathangan; Boherkill, Rahilla Glebe; Shraud and Bohereenagorr in the town of Kildare in the county of Kildare (map of this 27 km segment).

== See also ==
- Roads in Ireland
- National primary road
- National secondary road
