= Billy Burns =

Billy Burns may refer to:

- Billy Burns (footballer) (1907–?), English football player
- Billy Burns (baseball) (born 1989), American baseball player
- Billy Burns (rugby league) (born 1998), Australian rugby league footballer
- Billy Burns (rugby union) (born 1994), Irish rugby union player
- Billy Burns (runner) (born 1969), American runner
- Billy Burns (trombonist) (c. 1904–1963), American jazz trombonist
- Billy Don Burns (born 1949), American singer and songwriter
- Billy Joe Burns (born 1989), footballer from Northern Ireland

== See also ==
- Bill Burns (disambiguation)
- William Burns (disambiguation)
