= Slate River =

Slate River may refer to:

- Slate River (Ireland)
- Slate River, New Zealand, a stream in New Zealand
- Two streams in the U.S. state of Michigan:
  - Slate River (Baraga County, Michigan)
  - Slate River (Gogebic County, Michigan)
- Slate River (Colorado), a stream in the US state of Colorado
- Slate River (Virginia), a stream in the US state of Virginia
