= Figile River =

Coordinates: 53°09′N 7°05′W

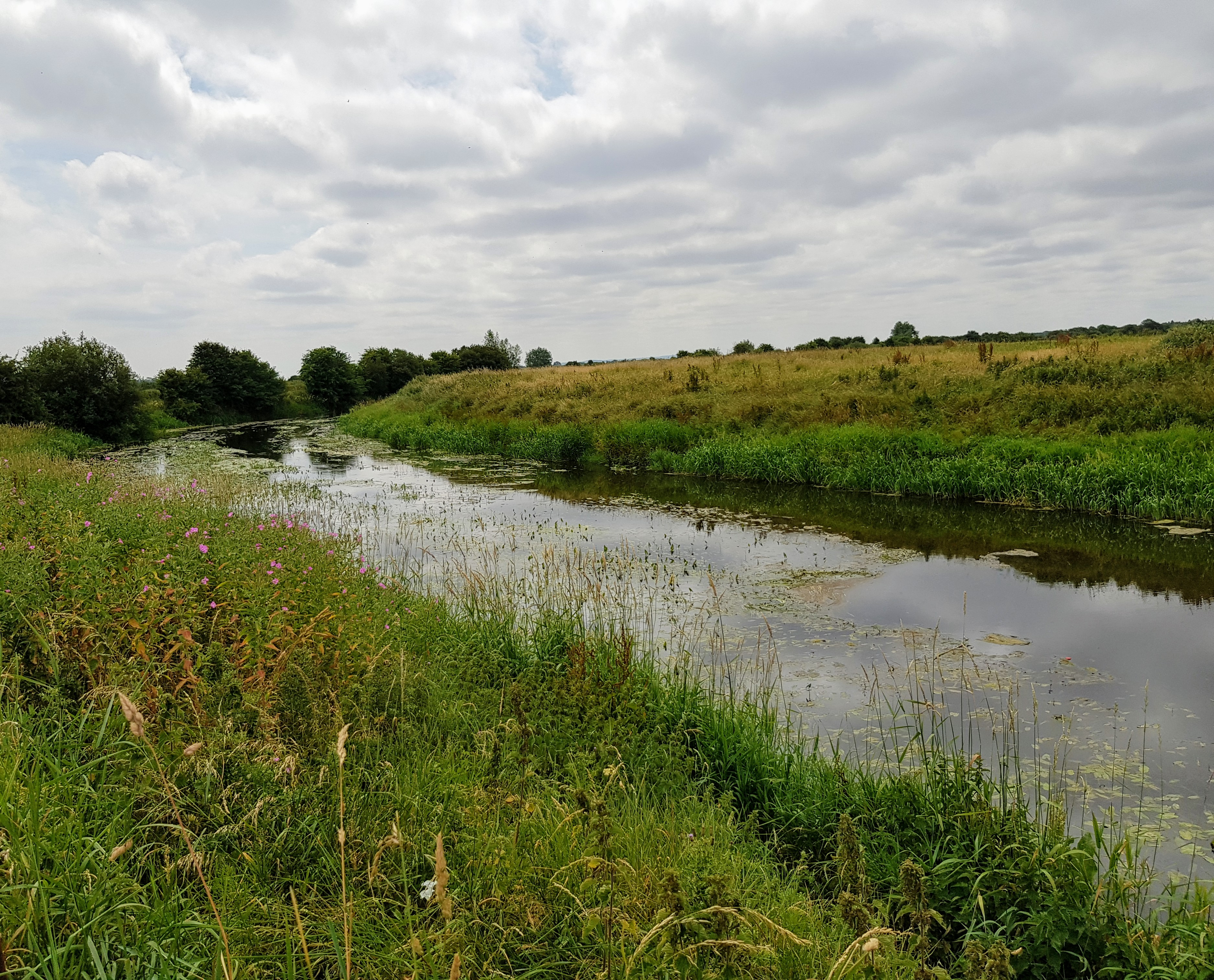
- Native name: Abhainn Fhiodh Gaibhle (Irish)

Location
- Country: Ireland

Physical characteristics
- Source
  - location: Cushaling, County Offaly
  - elevation: 70 m (230 ft)
- Mouth: River Barrow
  - location: Monasterevin, County Kildare
- Length: 33.4 km (20.8 mi)
- Basin size: 639 km^{2} (247 sq mi)
- Discharge
  - average: 0.350 m^{3}/s (12.4 cu ft/s)

Basin features
- River system: Three Sisters
- Tributaries
  - left: Black River, River Cushaling, Slate River
  - right: Crabtree River

The Figile River (/fɪˈɡiːl/; Irish: Abhainn Fhiodh Gaibhle) is a river in eastern Ireland.

== Name ==
The earliest recorded name is Fidgable/Fid nGabli, meaning "Gabul's Wood", recorded in the Book of Leinster and the Metrical Dindshenchas, both c. 1160. It is also mentioned in Buile Shuibhne ("Suibhne's Frenzy", 12th century) as Fiodh Gaibhle, a site of refuge for the maddened Suibhne where he lived for a year, eating holly berries and acorns and drinking from uisci na Gabhla ("Gabul's waters"). The Anglicisation Fegowly first appears in the 17th century, becoming Feagile on Alex Taylor's 1783 map and Figile on the 1843 Ordnance Survey map. It was here that Fionn Mac Cumhaill is said to have been concealed by his mother Muirne from his family's enemies and brought up by her sisters deep in the woods after the killing of his father.

== Course ==
The Figile River begins at the union of the Crabtree and Cushaling rivers, near the County Kildare-County Offaly border. It meets the Black River tributary and continues northwest, crossing and recrossing the bog railway. It crosses under the R401 at the Kilcumber Bridge, a triple-arch masonry bridge, built c. 1790. The Figile continues south, meeting the Philipstown River outside Clonbulloge. It is bridged by the R442 at Saint Patrick's Bridge and flows on southwards, passing under the R442 again near Millgrove House. The Figile passes under the R419 west of Bracknagh and flows on southeast where it is joined by the Slate River and the Cushina River before entering County Kildare at Pollagorteen. It continues southward through Clogheen and forms part of the County Laois-County Kildare border, draining into the River Barrow at Passlands, just north of Monasterevin.

== Wildlife ==
The Figile is known as a brown trout, common bream, common rudd, common roach and northern pike fishery.

== See also ==
- Rivers of Ireland
