= Irish Parachute Club =

Parachuting and skydiving club in Ireland

Clonbullogue Airfield Irish Parachute Club
- IATA: none; ICAO: EICL

Summary
- Airport type: Private
- Serves: Edenderry, Portarlington, Rathangan, Kildare
- Elevation AMSL: 190 ft / 58 m
- Coordinates: 53°14′58″N 7°7′24″W
- Website: http://www.skydive.ie/
- Interactive map of Clonbullogue Airfield

Runways
Direction	Length		Surface
Direction	ft	m	Surface
09/27	2,526	770	Grass
- No lighting, no fuel

The Irish Parachute Club (IPC) is an air sports club, located in Clonbullogue, County Offaly, in Ireland.

== History ==
The Irish Parachute Club was founded in 1956 by former paratrooper Freddie Bond, and began operations at Weston airfield in Leixlip. In December 1959, the IPC organised emergency supply drops to the islands of Inishturk, Inishturbot and Inishark. In February 1963, the club organised emergency supply drops over the Wicklow Mountains during the severe winter of that year. The IPC trained several teams that competed internationally in 1962, 1964 and 1966, and at a number of other international events subsequently. IPC-trained skydivers participated in several world records.

The club operated from a number of locations before establishing a drop zone in 1974 near the R402 road, southwest of Edenderry. The first club aircraft, a Cessna 172, was purchased in the same year. In 1981, the IPC moved to Esker More near Daingean and an IPC-based team Gael Force competed internationally. In 1983, a Cessna 206 was purchased and, in 1988, the club moved to its current location at Clonbullogue Airfield, south-southwest of Edenderry. A number of Irish skydiving records have been set at this location, including a 51 person formation in July 2008.

Later developments have included the construction of hangars and other buildings and the purchase of a PAC P-750 XSTOL turbine aircraft. Averaging over twelve thousand jumps annually,the IPC operates on weekends, bank holidays, and on some weekdays in summer. The club offers tandem skydiving, Accelerated Free Fall (AFF), and static line parachuting training programmes.

== Airfield ==
Clonbullogue Airfield has one grass strip runway running east-west which is 770 m long and 18 m wide.

== See also ==
- Parachute Association of Ireland (PAI)
