= Lullymore =

Civil parish and village in County Kildare, Ireland

Lullymore Loilgheach Mór
- Village
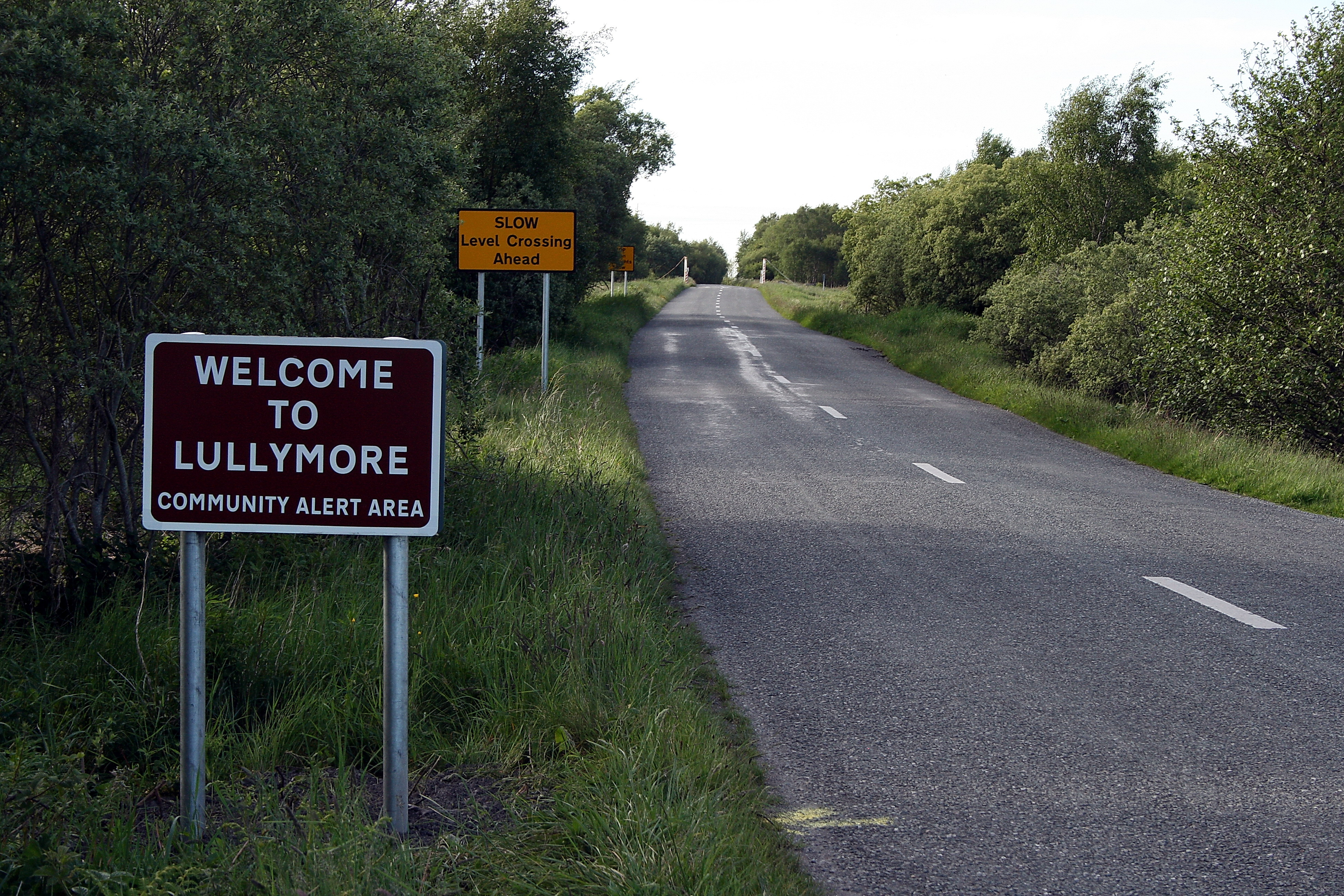
- Welcome sign on approach to Lullymore

- Location in Ireland
- Coordinates: 53°16′29″N 6°56′45″W
- Country: Ireland
- Province: Leinster
- County: County Kildare

Area
  - Total: 21.48 km^{2} (8.29 sq mi)
- Time zone: UTC+0 (WET)
  - Summer (DST): UTC-1 (IST (WEST))
- Irish Grid Reference: N700256

Lullymore (Irish: Loilgheach Mór) is a civil parish and village in County Kildare, Ireland. It is in the historical barony of Offaly East. The lowest observed 20th century air temperature in Ireland, -18.8 °C was measured at Lullymore on 2 January 1979.

== Location ==
Lullymore is situated on the R414 road between Rathangan and Allenwood. The village forms an island of arable land, surrounded on all sides by the Bog of Allen.

Lullymore is situated 6 miles from Rathangan and about 3 miles from Allenwood.

Historical population
Year	Pop.	±%
1871	129	—
1881	164	+27.1%
1911	92	−43.9%
1926	72	−21.7%
1936	64	−11.1%
1956	88	+37.5%
1961	78	−11.4%
1971	99	+26.9%
1979	112	+13.1%
1981	121	+8.0%
1986	138	+14.0%
1991	144	+4.3%
1996	131	−9.0%
2002	163	+24.4%
2006	183	+12.3%
2011	191	+4.4%
2016	187	−2.1%

== Business ==
Lullymore briquette factory, operated by Bord Na Mona opened in 1936 and closed in 1992 due to falling demand for its products.

== Sport and amenities ==
Lullymore Heritage & Discovery Park is an important visitor attraction in the west Kildare region. It is a destination for families, school tours, birthday parties and tourists.

The Bog of Allen Nature Centre, run by Irish Peatland Conservation Council, is a national 'centre of excellence' for peatland education, research and conservation. Facilities include a peatland museum, exhibitions about the Bog of Allen, a research library, habitats and gardens including the largest garden of carnivorous plants in Ireland.

== See also ==
- List of towns and villages in Ireland
