= Clonbullogue Airfield =

Airfield in County Offaly, Ireland

- IATA: none; ICAO: EICL

Summary
- Airport type: Private
- Owner: Irish Parachute Club Limited
- Location: Clonbullogue
- Elevation AMSL: 240 ft (73 m)
- Coordinates: 53°14′59″N 7°7′24″W
- Interactive map of Clonbullogue Airfield

Runways
| Direction | Length | | Surface |
| Direction | m | ft | Surface |
|---|---|---|---|
| 09/27 | 770 | 2,526 | Grass |
- Source: Irish AIS

Clonbullogue Airfield is a small Irish airfield located about 2 km (1.2 mi) west of Clonbullogue and 6 NM (11 km; 6.9 mi) south of Edenderry in County Offaly, Ireland. It is owned and operated by the Irish Parachute Club which is based at the field. The airfield has one grass runway running east–west which is 770 by 18 m (2,526 by 59 ft). Six aircraft are based at the field, most of them owned by the Irish Parachute Club. There is usually busy parachuting at weekends and public holidays so flying restrictions are enforced around this area.
