= Rathangan, County Kildare =

Town in County Kildare, Ireland

Rathangan Irish: Ráth Iomgháin
- Town
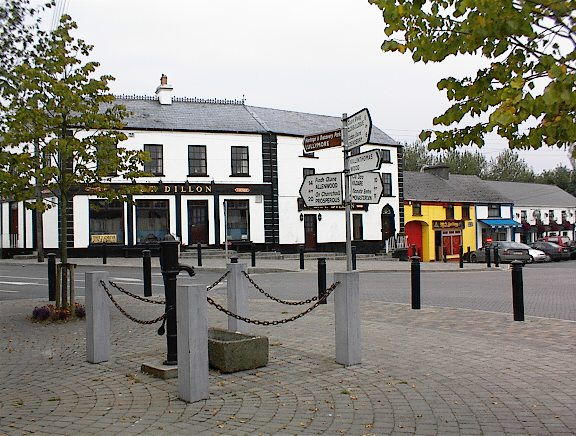
- Town centre

- Location in Ireland
- Coordinates: 53°13′18″N 6°59′50″W
- Country: Ireland
- Province: Leinster
- County: County Kildare

Population (2022)
  - Total: 3,263
- Time zone: UTC+0 (WET)
  - Summer (DST): UTC-1 (IST (WEST))
- Irish Grid Reference: N668196
- Website: www.rathangan.ie

Rathangan (/ræˈθæŋɡən/; Irish: Ráth Iomgháin, meaning 'Iomghan's Fort') is a town in the west of County Kildare, Ireland. As of 2022, the population was 3,263. It is located 65 km (40 mi) from the centre of Dublin, and 14 km (8.7 mi) from Kildare, at the intersection of the R401, R414, and R419 regional roads. The Slate River and the Grand Canal run through the town. The town is in a townland and civil parish of the same name.

Rathangan is situated beside the Bog of Allen, and is in close proximity to the lowlands of the Curragh.

== History ==
The rath or fort of Iomghain, from which the town gets its name, has been dated to between 600 and 700 AD, and is situated to the northwest of the modern town on the Clonbulloge road. Several Iomghains are documented in the history of this period and it is unclear who the fort is actually named for. Richard FitzGerald, 3rd Earl of Kildare died in Rathangan in 1329 aged twelve years. Rathangan Castle came under the control of forces loyal to Thomas FitzGerald, 10th Earl of Kildare during the Kildare Rebellion (1634–37) against the rule of Henry VIII. The rebellion was short-lived and ended when Fitzgerald was arrested and executed in London for treason. The present-day Church of Ireland stands in close proximity to the Rath. The Church of Ireland site was originally the site of the Catholic Church. A later Catholic Church, St Patrick's, was built in the early 19th Century. This building became a Community Centre in the latter part of the 20th Century and the Catholic Church moved location again to a new building in the 1950s.

Extensions of the Grand Canal to Monasterevin and Athy in the late 18th century led to the current layout of the town, due to the building of houses for the canal engineers which were complemented by grander houses for the local gentry. Society of United Irishmen forces led by Captain John Doorley captured the town briefly during the Irish Rebellion of 1798. A Yeoman and agent for the Duke of Leinster named James Spencer died during the four-day battle after he was allegedly piked to death on his staircase. Another version purports that he was shot. Despite Spencer's position of privilege and his stance against Wolfe Tone Republicanism, which was taking hold of ordinary people in County Kildare at this time, local legend suggests that he was well-liked and people were saddened by his death. Spencer's Court and Spencer's Bridge are named in his honour. The other notable casualty of the Battle of Rathangan and its aftermath was Captain Doorley of Lullymore himself. The rebel leader was executed by hanging following the recapture of the town. A monument to him and the other rebel leaders can be found in nearby Lullymore. No such monument exists in Rathangan itself. The residential estate of Doorley Park is named in his honour though.

George Pomeroy Colley, a Major General in the British Armed Forces during the First Boer War and later Governor and High commissioner of Southern Africa, was born in Rathangan in 1835. He spent his early childhood there before his schooling began in Surrey. The Pomeroy Park housing development is named after him.

Colonel Eamon Broy, also known as Ned Broy, lived in Rathangan from his birth in 1887. He served as a double agent in the Dublin Metropolitan Police and acted as an informant for the Irish Republican Army and specifically for Michael Collins during the Irish War of Independence. Later he would give his allegiance to Collins and the Irish Free State during the Irish Civil War. He became a Garda Síochána Commissioner and also held the distinguished position of President of the Olympic Federation of Ireland.

Lewis's Topographical Dictionary 1837: RATHANGAN, a market and post-town, and a parish, partly in the barony of EAST OPHALY, but chiefly in that of WEST OPHALY, county of KILDARE, and province of LEINSTER, 14 ¾ miles (W.) from Naas, and 30 (S. W. by W.) from Dublin, on the road from Kildare to Edenderry; containing 2911 inhabitants, of which number, 1165 are in the town, which is entirely in the barony of West Ophaly, and near the Grand Canal, and in 1831 contained 215 houses.

It is a chief station of the constabulary police, and has a market on Monday, and fairs in June, and on 26 August and 12 November. The parish comprises 8872 statute acres, as applotted under the tithe act: the principal seat within its limits is Tottenham Green, that of Geo. Tottenham, Esq.

The living is a rectory and vicarage, in the diocese of Kildare, being the corps of the prebend of Rathangan in the cathedral of Kildare, and in the patronage of the Duke Dumont of Leinster and the Bishop, of whom the former has the right of presentation for two turns and the latter for one: the tithes amount to £553. 16. 11. The glebe-house was erected in 1810, by aid of a loan of £625 and a gift of £100 from the late board of First Fruits; and there is a glebe comprising 29a. 2r. 26p. The church is a neat edifice with a handsome tower; the whole is in excellent order. In the R. C. divisions, the parish forms part of the union or district of Kildare. The chapel is a spacious building: there is also a meeting house for the Society of Friends. In a school under the National Board, and one supported by Lord Harberton, about 200 children are educated; and there are three private schools, in which there are about 120 children. There is a dispensary in the town, supported in the usual manner.

Bord na Móna's increased activity in the 1940s boosted the population and the number of transient workers. An influx of workers to the Ballydermot Camp had a significant impact on the sporting field. The Kilinthomas hurling team won four Kildare Championships in a row from 1946 with many of their players being transient workers from Munster counties.. The closure of the canal systems and the decline of bog-based interests of the company led to a decline in the town's fortunes. This in turn led to an increase in emigration by the town's young people.

Many Bord na Móna houses can be found in the areas surrounding Rathangan. The addition of Ard Mhuire (beside the Rath)to the town's housing stock throughout the 1960s and 1970s was followed by St Patrick's Park in the late 1970s. St Patrick's Park was expanded further in the 1980s. It was located on the site of the old Demesne.

Further housing development throughout the 1990s, 2000s and 2010s would include such places as Beechgrove, Tannery Wharf and Doorley Park amongst others. The most recent development in the late 2010s was Rathangan Manor.

The upturn of Ireland's economy in the 1990s again led to increased prosperity, and the extension of the M7 through the nearby towns of Kildare and Monasterevin has made Dublin more accessible.

The ruins of the old Tannery were demolished in the early 1990s. The site was converted to become Tannery Park. The playground was later added by Kildare County Council during the 2000s.

The old Rectory, commonly referred to as "Buddy's" by locals, fell into ruin by the middle of the 20th century and was finally demolished in the mid-1990s. The site made way for housing.

Kilinthomas Woods was developed by Coillte in the early 1990s as a place for recreation and walks. The ruins of the old Bord na Móna camp at this location remain but are now privately owned.

The Sister's of Mercy Convent building on Church Street was repurposed for industrial use by Noone Engineering in the early 1990s also.

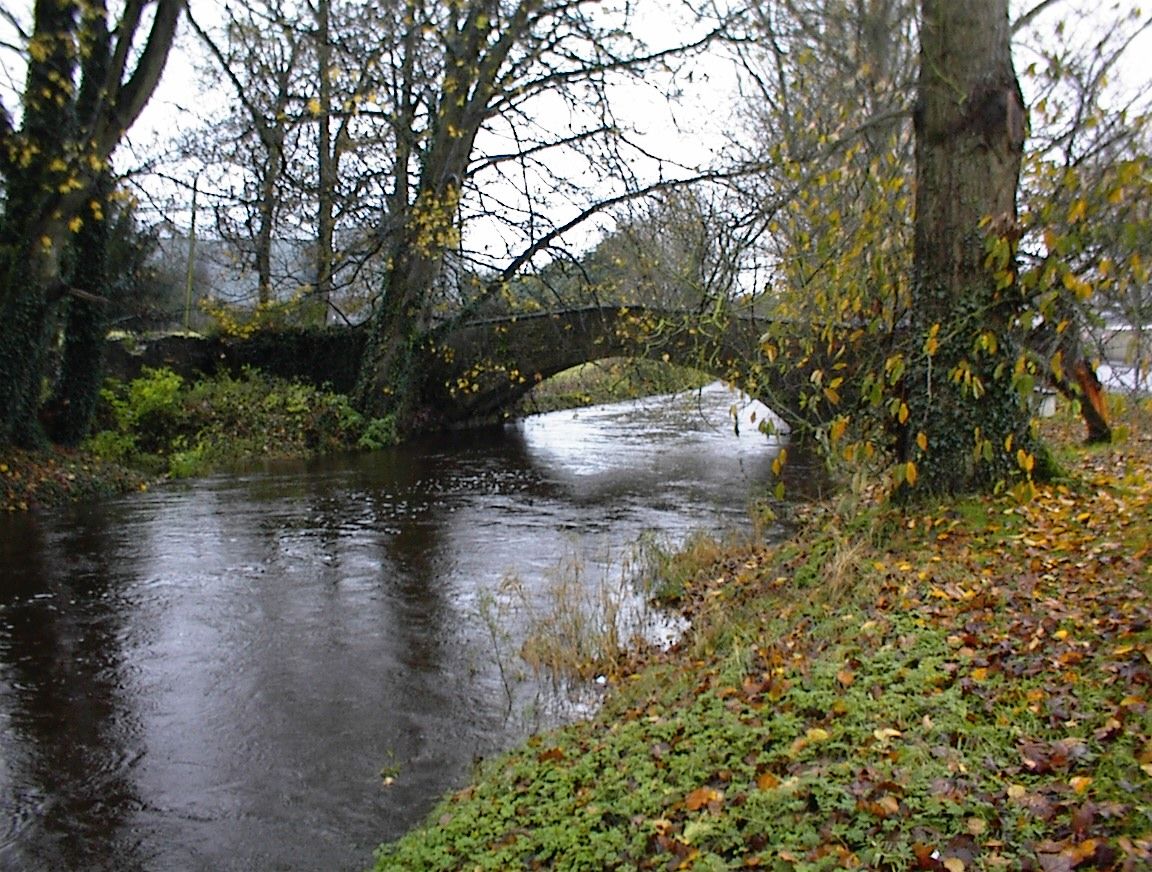
The Slate River

== Sports ==
The primary sporting activities in Rathangan are Gaelic football (Rathangan GAA), tennis, soccer, and hurling (cricket, rugby, polo, and chess are also played). Rathangan AFC is a soccer club in the town. Ardscoil Rath Iomghain became Leinster Champions on 5 March 2015. They were crowned all-Ireland Champions for the first time in the school's footballing history. The Gaelic football team usually compete in the Kildare Intermediate Football Championship and won it last in 2001. Other intermediate victories occurred in 1993 and 1981. Rathangan GAA last won the Kildare Senior Football Championship in 1925. Former Leinster Rugby player Johne Murphy grew up in Clonmoyle, just outside the village. He also played Gaelic football with Ellistown GFC.

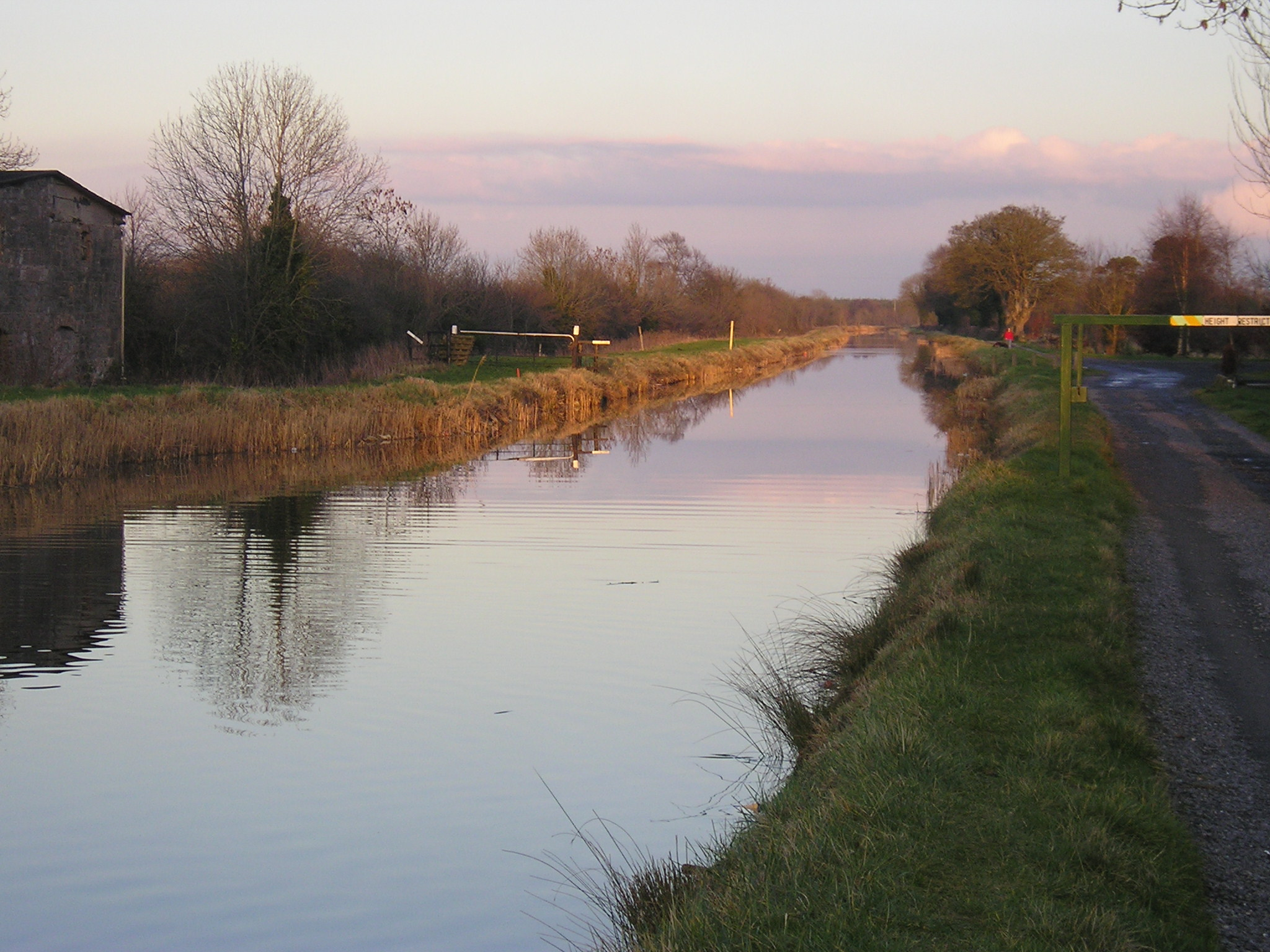
The Grand Canal

== Culture ==
For several years the Rathangan Lughnasa festival was held during the August Bank Holiday weekend, to celebrate the arts and crafts, music, literature, history, and sports of the town. Damien Dempsey, Jerry Fish and the Mudbug Club, The Blizzards, The Walls, Jack L, Lemon and John Spillane have all performed in the town as part of the Lughnasa since 2004.

In 2009, The Lughnasa Festival hosted the biggest concert ever staged in Rathangan when international band The Waterboys headlined the bill which also included Mundy.

The writer, broadcaster and journalist Maura Laverty and the poet William A. Byrne both lived in Rathangan during their earlier years. Both authors are commemorated with plaques in the town.

In 2024, Rathangan signed a historic twinning agreement with Bruce Springsteen's hometown, Freehold Borough, New Jersey, USA, in honour of his great-great grand mother who emigrated to the United States from the town.

== Notable people ==
- Edward Broy, revolutionary, republican, commissioner of Garda Síochána
- William A. Byrne (William Dara), poet, was from Rathangan and wrote about the place.
- George Pomeroy Colley, British military strategist and diplomat, Governor of South Africa.
- Sean J. Conlon, founder and owner of Conlon & Co, a real estate merchant bank in Chicago and Host of The Deed: Chicago on CNBC
- Brian Dowling; winner of Big Brother in 2001 and Ultimate Big Brother in 2010, ex-presenter of SMTV, and The Mint.
- Jedward, twin duo who gained fame on the British talent show The X Factor.
- Maura Laverty, writer, broadcaster and journalist
- Michael Noonan, professional footballer
- Fiona O'Loughlin, former TD and current Senator

== See also ==
- List of towns and villages in Ireland
