= Offaly West =

Barony (administrative area) in County Kildare, Ireland

Offaly West Uíbh Fhailí Thiar (Irish)
- Barony
- Interactive map of Offaly West
- Sovereign state: Ireland
- County: Kildare

Area
  - Total: 164.31 km^{2} (63.44 sq mi)

Offaly West (Irish: Uíbh Fhailí Thiar; sometimes spelled Ophaly) is a barony in County Kildare, Ireland.

== Etymology ==
Offaly West takes its name from the Kingdom of Uí Failghe. It is not to be confused with County Offaly.

== Location ==
Offaly West is located in west County Kildare, east of the River Barrow.

== History ==
Offaly West were part of the ancient lands of the Ua Conchobhair Failghe (O'Connor Faly). As Lord of Clanmaliere the Ó Diomasaigh (O'Dempsey) held part of this barony. The Offaly barony was divided into east and west baronies before 1807.

== List of settlements ==
Below is a list of settlements in Offaly West:

- Monasterevin
- Rathangan (part)

== See also ==
Offaly East
