= William Burn (disambiguation) =

William Burn was an architect.

William Burn may also refer to:

- William John Burn, Anglican colonial bishop
- William Wallace Allison Burn, aviator

== See also ==
- William Burns (disambiguation)
- William Byrne (disambiguation)
