= Groundswell (organization) =

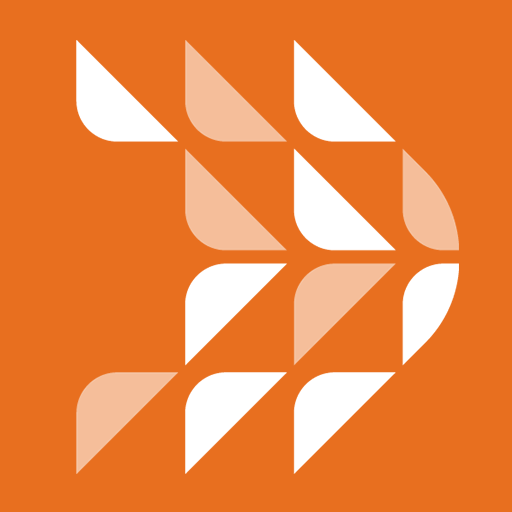
- Company type: non-profit
- Founded: 2009
- Founders: Will Byrne, Max Harper, Marcus Ryan, John Lauer, Kristen Psaki, Tony Ficarotta
- Headquarters: Washington, D.C., United States
- Key people: Michelle Moore (CEO)
- Website: groundswell.org

Groundswell is a 501(c)3 nonprofit dedicated to building community power, strengthening local resilience, and advancing energy affordability by making clean energy more accessible. With a mission to cut electricity bills in half for households that need savings, Groundswell develops and operates community solar and resilience hub projects that benefit under-served households.

== History ==
Groundswell was founded in 2009 by a group of field organizers who had previously worked together on the 2008 Barack Obama Presidential Campaign. Groundswell co-founder Will Byrne was the organization's CEO through 2014. The organization operated under two previous names, The DC Project and Weatherize DC, before becoming Groundswell. Groundswell chose Washington, D.C. as its hub because it is one of a small but growing number of places where residents are able to choose their energy suppliers.

Since then, Groundswell has grown to serve the Mid Atlantic region including Georgia, Maryland, North Carolina, New York and Illinois. It is led by CEO Michelle Moore, an experienced energy executive and former White House official with roots in rural Georgia.

== Clean energy ==
Groundswell develops community solar projects and programs that connect solar power with economic empowerment, enabling people and community-based businesses to work together to switch to solar energy.

Groundswell works with other non-profit organizations to reach out to economically diverse local communities.

Groundswell’s SharePower subscription model was designed to help neighbors share power with neighbors.

Groundswell launched the Rural Renaissance Roadshow in 2023 with its inaugural event in Bentonville, Arkansas, as part of its mission to promote sustainable energy solutions and economic resilience in rural communities across the United States. Building on the success of the initial gathering, Groundswell established the Roadshow as an annual conference, bringing together local leaders, policymakers, and innovators to share best practices and strategies for rural development. The 2024 conference was hosted in Macon, Georgia, and the 2025 event took place in Opelika, Alabama, further expanding the Roadshow’s reach and impact throughout the rural South.

== See also ==
- Civic consumption
- Social enterprise
