= William Burns =

William, Will, or Willie Burns may refer to:

== Politics and law ==
- William Burns (Scottish historian) (1809–1876), Scottish lawyer and historian
- William D. Burns (born 1973), Illinois state representative
- W. Haydon Burns (1912–1987), governor of Florida
- William Herbert Burns (1878–1964), Canadian politician, merchant, and Olympic curling champion
- William J. Burns (1861–1932), American director of the Bureau of Investigation (predecessor to the FBI) 1921–1924
- William J. Burns (diplomat) (born 1956), CIA director and former United States Deputy Secretary of State
- William L. Burns (1913–2005), member of the New York State Assembly
- Bill Burns (Australian politician) (William George Burns, 1933–2009), member of the Australian House of Representatives

== Sports ==
- William Burns (cricketer) (1883–1916), English cricketer
- William Burns (lacrosse) (1875–1953), Canadian Olympic lacrosse player
- William Burns (referee) (1952–2019), English football referee
- Tosher Burns (William Burns, 1902–1984), Irish international footballer of the 1920s
- Will Burns (racing driver) (born 1990), British racing driver
- Willie Burns (baseball) (1916–1966), American Negro league baseball player
- Willie Burns (swimmer) (1910–1967), Scottish swimmer
- Willie Burns (footballer), Scottish footballer
- Bill Burns (baseball) (William Thomas Burns, 1880–1953), American baseball pitcher involved in the Black Sox scandal
- Billy Burns (baseball) (William John Burns, born 1989), American baseball player
- Bill Burns (footballer) (William Philip Burns, 1884–1955), Australian rules footballer
- Billy Burns (footballer) (William Burns, 1907–?), English football player
- Billy Burns (rugby league) (William Burns, born 1998), Australian rugby league player
- Billy Joe Burns (William Joseph Burns, born 1989), footballer from Northern Ireland

== Others ==
- William Burns (saddler) (1769–1790), brother of Robert Burns the poet
- William Nicol Burns (1791–1872), sixth child, third born and second surviving son of Robert Burns the poet
- William Chalmers Burns (1815–1868), Scottish evangelist and missionary
- William F. Burns (1932–2021). U.S. Army major general
- William Wallace Burns (1825–1892), American soldier
- William Burns (died 1907), victim of lynching in Cumberland, Maryland, see lynching of William Burns
- Bill Burns (anchor) (William M. Burns, 1913–1997), American news anchor

== See also ==
- Bill Burns (disambiguation)
- Billy Burns (disambiguation)
- William Burn (disambiguation)
- William Byrne (disambiguation)
- William Burnes (1721–1784), father of poet Robert Burns
- Burns (surname)
