= Sean J. Conlon =

Irish-American businessman

Sean J. Conlon (born about 1970) is an Irish-American businessman, real estate entrepreneur, investor, television personality and philanthropist. He grew up in Rathangan, County Kildare, Ireland before moving to Chicago.

He is chairman and founder of Conlon & Co, CONLON/Christie's International Real Estate, CONLON Commercial and Conlon Capital. He is a co-host of The Deed, an unscripted television series focused on real estate investing on CNBC.

== Early life ==
Conlon was born in Birmingham, England to Irish parents John and Margo Conlon. His late father sold aluminium gutters, and his mother runs a kindergarten from her home. Conlon was raised in Rathangan, County Kildare, Ireland, in a modest home; his parents struggled financially, with the bank at one point trying to repossess their house. Before emigrating to America in 1990, Conlon attended the College of Marketing and Design, Dublin and worked in London as a credit analyst, a job he disliked, and living in a "hovel that sat near the railroad tracks", with ten other men.

== Career ==
Conlon worked for a couple of years as a janitor, "cleaning during the day, painting apartments at night". He eventually saved money to buy an apartment, and in 1993 he joined Koenig & Strey. He was recognized as a leader among real estate agents with annual transactions sales exceeding $150 million.

In January 2000, Conlon formed Sussex & Reilly ("Sussex"), an Illinois-based real estate brokerage firm. He sold his interest in Sussex in 2006.

Since 2002, Conlon has been a partner of Van & Conlon. In 2004, in partnership with others, he acquired Near North National Title, which was established in 1988 and processes billions of dollars in US real estate transactions each year. He sold Near North in February 2010. In 2005, Sean founded Connaught Real Estate Finance, a $100 million mezzanine fund that lends money to developers.

In 2009, he returned to residential real estate brokerage. In June 2013, Conlon became affiliated with one of the world's real estate networks, Christie's International Real Estate. Conlon is the Christie's exclusive affiliate in Chicago.

In 2017, he launched Conlon Capital, which focuses on commercial real estate lending.

=== Television personality ===
In November 2016, CNBC announced that Sean would be the co-host of its newest show The Deed, which premiered in March 2017. The show followed Conlon and Sidney Torres, another real estate developer, as they assisted other real estate developers.

In August 2017, CNBC announced that The Deed: Chicago was being renewed for a second season.

== Personal life ==
A "short marriage" was amicably dissolved early in Conlon's business career due to his "100-hour work weeks" and lack of time for a relationship.

The engagement of Conlon and Imogen Hervey-Bathurst- great-granddaughter of Sir Frederick Hervey-Bathurst, 5th Baronet and maternal granddaughter of the businessman Martin Peake, 2nd Viscount Ingleby was announced in The Times and the Daily Telegraph on 16 March 2022.
