= Bracknagh =

Bracknagh Breacánach
- Village
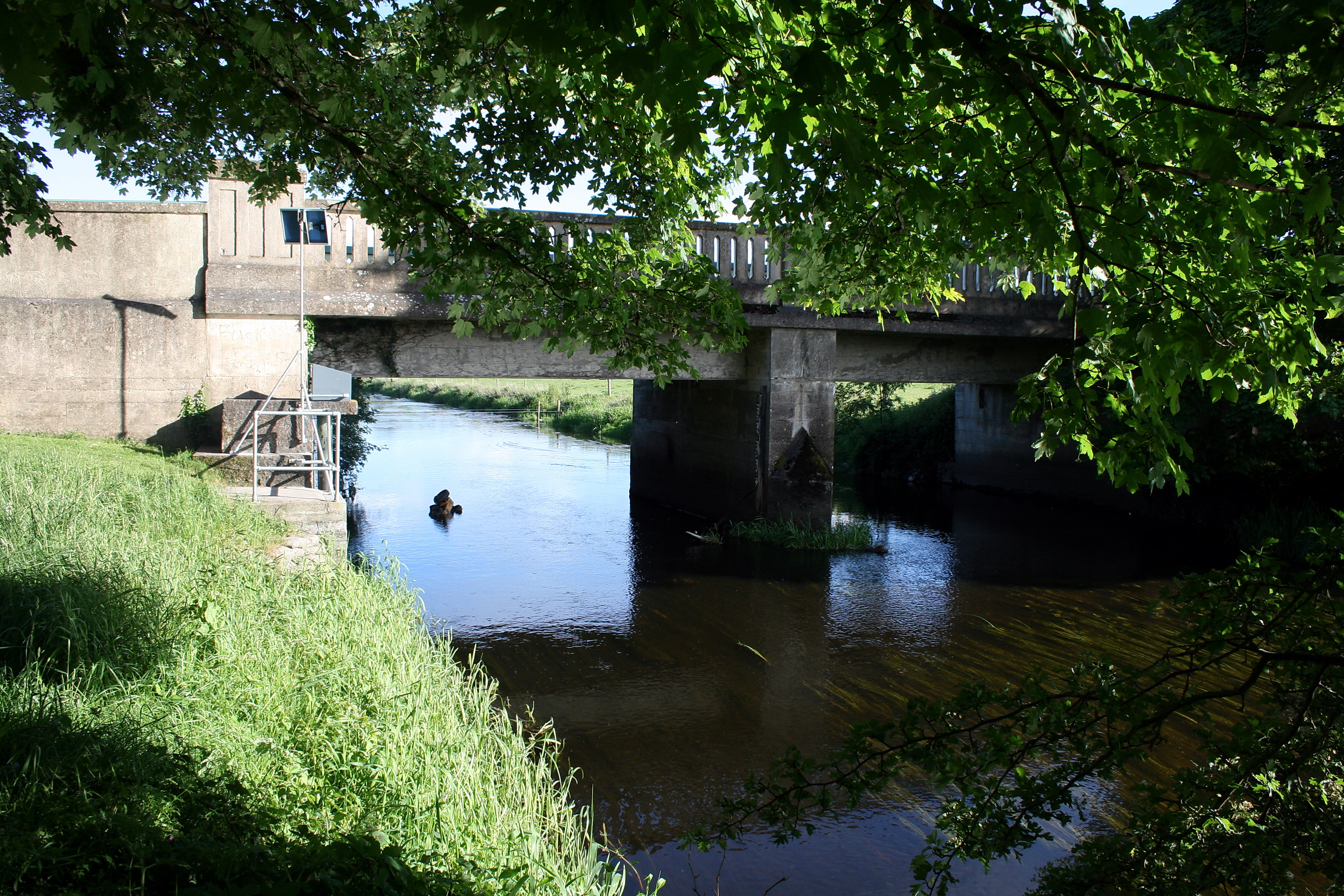
- R419 crossing the Figile River in Bracknagh

- Location in Ireland
- Coordinates: 53°12′35″N 7°05′49″W
- Country: Ireland
- Province: Leinster
- County: Offaly

Population (2022)
  - Total: 274
- Time zone: UTC+0 (WET)
  - Summer (DST): UTC-1 (IST (WEST))

Bracknagh or Bracnagh (Irish: Breacánach) is a small village in County Offaly, Ireland. It is at the junction of the R442 and R419 regional roads, close to the border with County Kildare, halfway between Portarlington and Rathangan (8 km from both).

It is thought that the settlement began with a small cluster of homes built around the road junction. Expansion along connected roads included the addition of two housing developments by Offaly County Council and Bord na Mona.

Bracknagh is home to the Ballynowlart church, where local tradition holds that the congregation were burned alive in the 1600s.

The local national school, St.Broghan's NS. There is a holy well, also associated with St. Broghan, nearby.

Bracknagh GAA is the local Gaelic Athletic Association (GAA) club and was founded in 1973. The club has won several Offaly Intermediate Football and Offaly Senior 'B' Football Championship titles.

Local community organisations include the Bracknagh Community association, Bracknagh Tidy Town committee and Bracknagh Heritage Society.

== Notable people ==
- John Joly (1857–1933), Irish physicist known for work in the field of radioactivity

== See also ==
- List of towns and villages in Ireland
