= Bill Burns (artist) =

Canadian artist

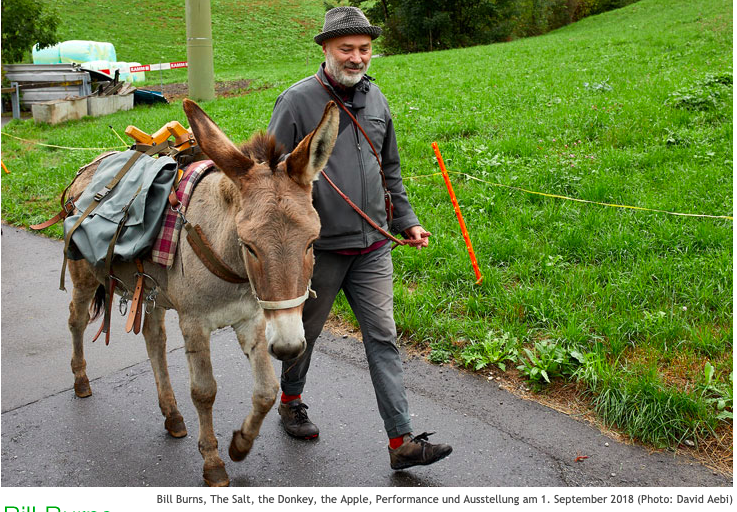
- Born: 1956 (age 69–70); Regina, Saskatchewan, Canada
- Education: Goldsmiths College, London
- Awards: Danish International Visiting Artist Award, Copenhagen; Pollock-Krasner Foundation, New York

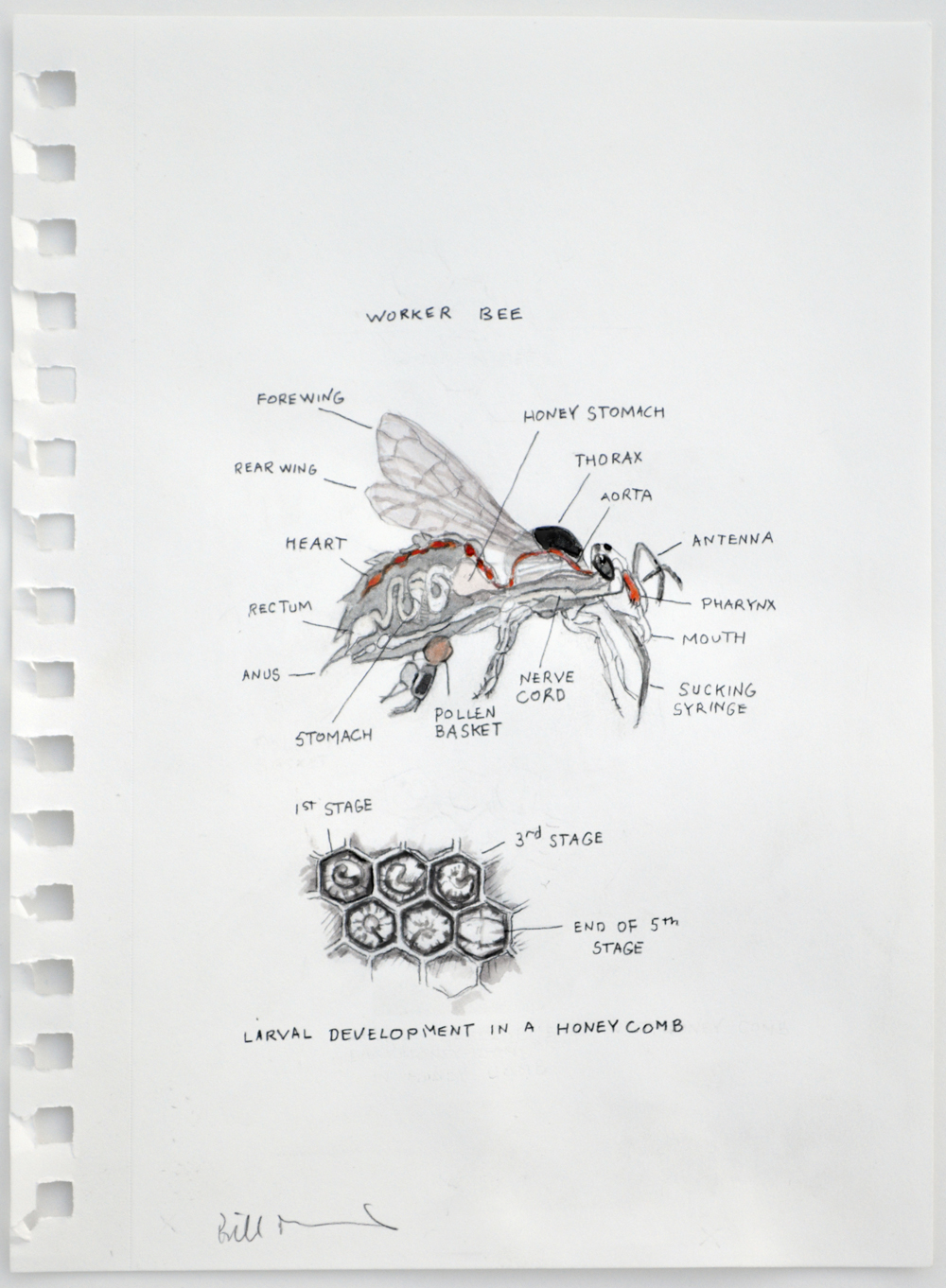
The Worker Bee, no 1, 2018

Bill Burns (born 1956) is a Canadian artist.

== Life and work ==
Burns is known for his artists' books, performance, sculpture, drawing and multiples. He completed his post-graduate work in London at Goldsmiths College under Gerard Hemsworth and John Latham where Latham was a visiting artist. His most recognized works are The Great Donkey Walk 2018 Amden Switzerland https://www.atelier-amden.ch/3_bill_burns_2018.html and Safety Gear for Small Animals 303 Gallery 1994 and MoMA New York 2005/06 and later at the Museum of Modern Art, New York in 2005/2006 and at the Institute of Contemporary Arts in London in 2008. His 2002 project "Everything I Could Buy on eBay About Malaria" which was shown at the Wellcome Trust in London, England is considered a seminal work in the area of electronic collecting. Other major solo projects include his Bird Radio work at the KW in Berlin (2007), Love and Affection at Mendes Wood Gallery in São Paulo (2011), and The Great Chorus at the Royal Ontario Museum (2016).

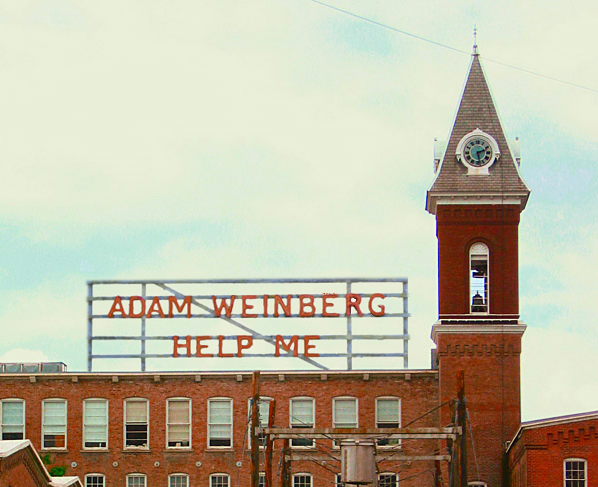
Study for Adam Weinberg Help Me, MASS MoCA 2012

Burns has published numerous books including Hans Ulrich Obrist Hear Us, London UK: Black Dog Publishing (2016). When Pain Strikes (Burns, Busby, Sawchuk), a critical anthology about pain and pain relief, Minneapolis: University of Minnesota Press (1999). Other book titles include Analgesia Montreal: Rochefort (1993); Urban Fauna Information Station. Toronto: Mercer Union (2002); Safety Gear for Small Animals Toronto: MOCCA, Toronto (2005); Bird Radio Berlin: KW and Cologne: Verlag der Buchhandlung Walther Koenig (2007); The Flora and Fauna Information Service - 0.800.0.0FAUNA0FLORA. London: ICA (2008).; and Dogs and Boats and Airplanes Told in the Form of Ivan the Terrible . Copenhagen: Space Poetry (2011). Burns has published dozens of guides, posters, and editions that are included in major museum collections throughout the world.

Burns's most notable biennial and museum exhibitions include the ICA in London, the KW in Berlin, the MoMA in New York City as well as Forum Arte y Vida at the Havana Biennial in Havana, Cuba, 2003, the Bienal del Fin del Mundo in Ushuaia, Argentina, 2007 and the Quebec City Biennial – Manif d'art 5, 2010, Biennial of the Moving Image, Buenos Aires, 2013, Bienale de Asuncion, Paraguay 2015 and Bienale de Curitiba, Brazil 2017.

== Galleries ==
Bill Burns has had solo shows at many galleries and museums including 303 Gallery, New York, Mendes-Wood Gallery, São Paulo and the ICA, London. He is represented by MKG127 in Toronto.
