= Will Byrne =

US-based activist and entrepreneur

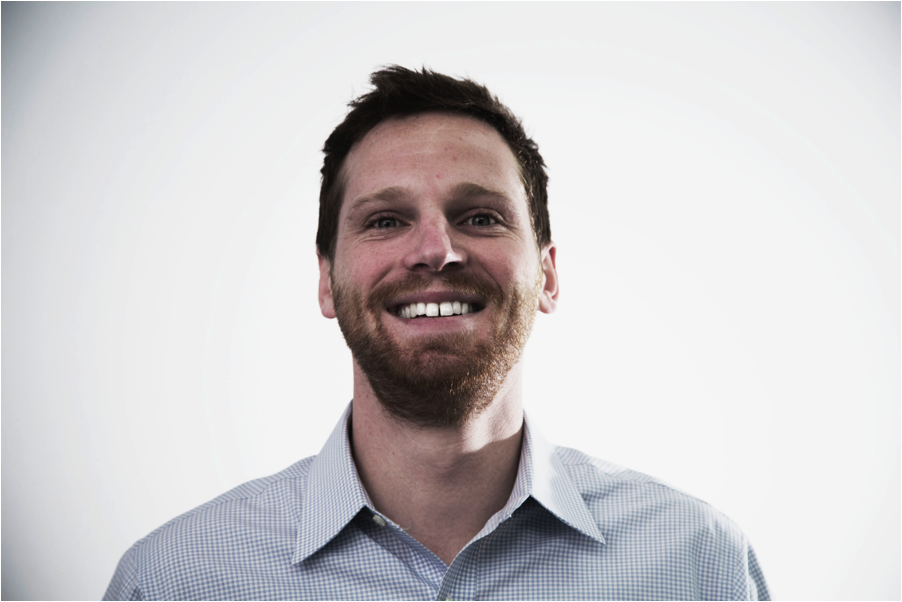
- Byrne in 2014
- Education: B.A. Vassar College
- Occupations: Activist, entrepreneur, CEO
- Known for: Groundswell (organization)

Will Byrne is an activist and entrepreneur. Will was named one of Forbes’s 30 Under 30.

== Early career ==
Byrne worked in journalism at Der Spiegel as well as the American Academy in Berlin, Germany, before joining Barack Obama’s 2008 presidential campaign.

During his work on President Obama's 2008 campaign, Byrne utilized online and offline community organizing tactics. Byrne and his co-founders saw the impact of community organizing in the political sphere. Rather than joining the administration after Obama was elected, Byrne went on to develop these tactics as a social entrepreneur.

== Groundswell ==
In 2009, Byrne, Max Harper, Marcus Ryan, John Lauer, Kristen Psaki, and Tony Ficarotta co-founded Groundswell after working on President Obama’s 2008 campaign. Groundswell is a non-profit organization based in Washington, D.C. that uses collective buying power to drive positive social change, especially in the clean energy sector. Byrne called this model "civic consumption." Byrne was CEO until 2014.

== Hasso Plattner Institute of Design at Stanford (school) ==
In 2015, Byrne joined the school as a Civic Innovation Fellow.

== Later work ==
Following Stanford, Byrne was Senior Director of the Innovation Lab at Human Rights First, and presented about issues of bias, inclusion, and human rights in computer vision and artificial intelligence technology. As of 2023, he was listed as an affiliated fellow at the Citris Policy Lab, which describes itself as supporting interdisciplinary research and education regarding the role of regulation in promoting innovation.

== Honors and awards ==
- Forbes 30 Under 30 Selection; Social Entrepreneurs, Forbes Magazine (December 2012)
- Champions of Change, White House Executive Office of the President, 2011

== See also ==
- Social entrepreneurship
- List of social entrepreneurs
