= R414 road (Ireland) =

Road in Ireland

R414 road
- Bóthar R414
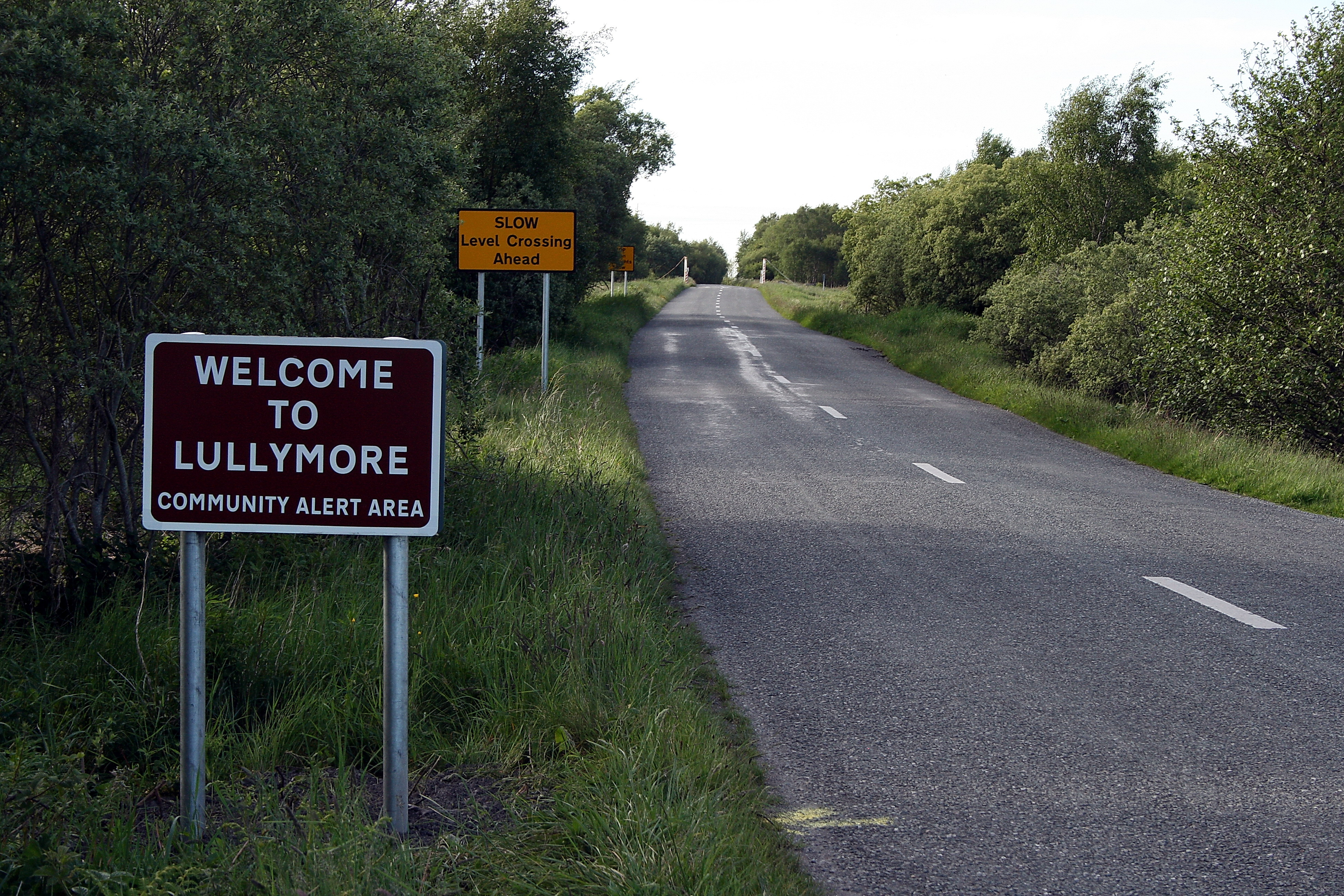
- The R414 approaching an industrial railway crossing in the Bog of Allen near Lullymore

Route information
- Length: 25 km (16 mi)

Location
- Country: Ireland
- Primary destinations: County Kildare; Monasterevin leaves the R445; Crosses the Dublin-Cork railway line; Rathangan – crosses the Grand Canal (Barrow branch) and the Slate River; Enters the Bog of Allen; Lullymore; Crosses the Grand Canal; Terminates at the R403 west of Allenwood

Highway system
- Roads in Ireland; Motorways; Primary; Secondary; Regional

The R414 road is a regional road in Ireland, linking Monasterevin to Rathangan to Allenwood, all in County Kildare. The section from Rathangan to Allenwood takes it through the Bog of Allen and industrial peat works operated by Bord na Móna. The route is 25 km (16 mi) long.

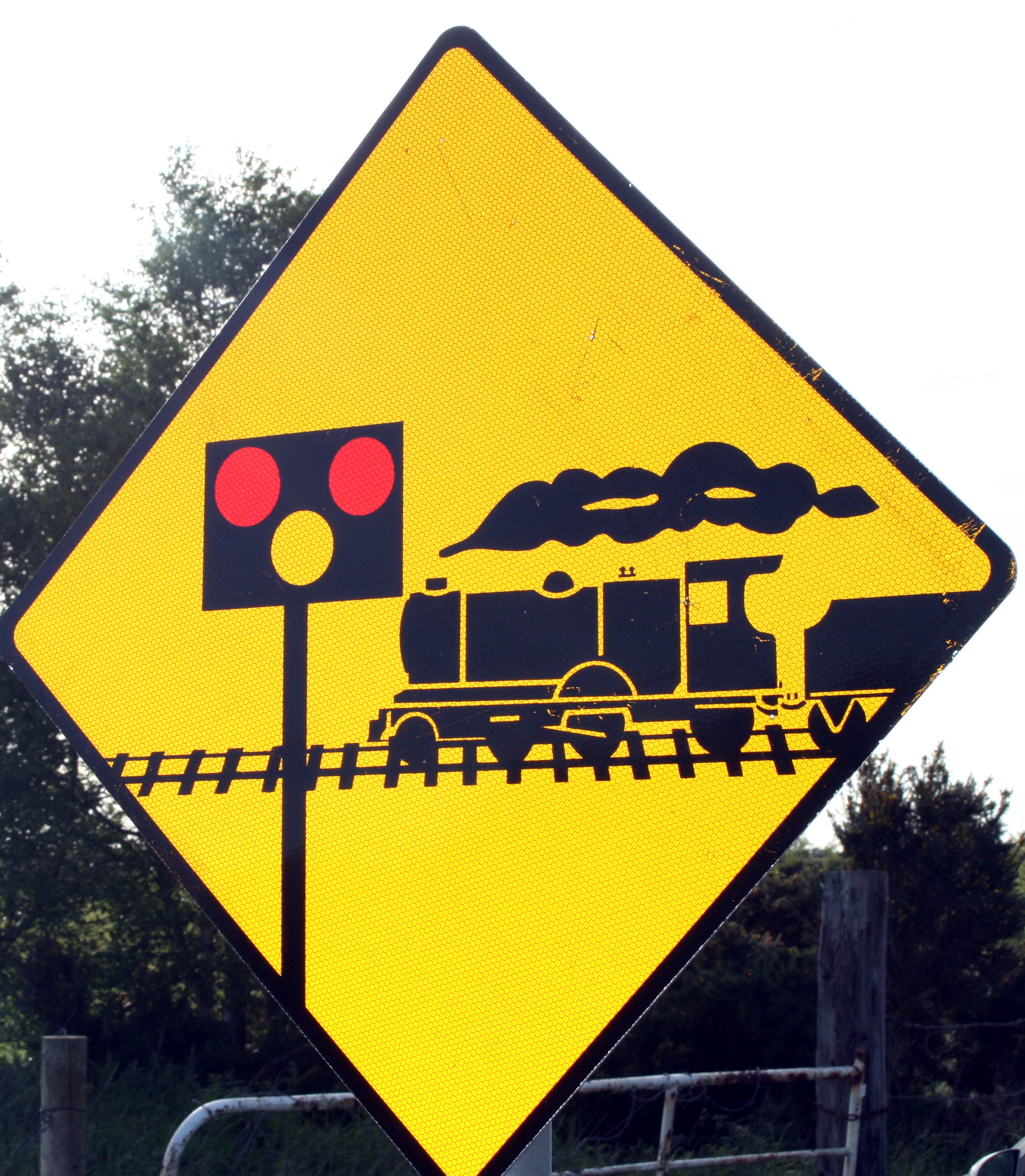
Sign on the R414

== See also ==
- Roads in Ireland
- National primary road
- National secondary road
