= Billy Don Burns =

American singer-songwriter

- Born: Billy Don Burns; July 19, 1949 (age 77); Fifty-Six, Arkansas, United States
- Genres: Country, Americana, alternative country
- Occupation: Musician
- Instruments: Guitar, vocals
- Years active: 1970–present
- Labels: Immortal, Epic, Virgin, Bloodshot, 30 Tigers/Naked Albino
- Website: www.billydonburns.net

Billy Don Burns (born July 19, 1949) is an American singer and songwriter.

== Early life ==
Burns was born in Fifty-Six, a small incorporated town in north-central Arkansas. His parents were Junior Jackson Burns and Urene Balentine Burns. Burns's father worked as a farmer and timber worker. His house did not have electricity. Burns's music career began in his local church, and as a young man, he obtained a Gibson acoustic guitar, a brand he still plays today. Burns was influenced by country artists such as Johnny Cash, Hank Williams, and Jimmy Driftwood. Hank Williams especially had a major impact on his life and career.

During the Vietnam War, Burns was trained as a paratrooper. He served stateside from January 1968 to January 1970. After leaving the service, Burns traveled to California, where he met one of his heroes, Merle Haggard. Haggard gave Burns his first chance to play music on television in Bakersfield, then a hot-spot for country music.

In 1971, Burns released his first single, "Tucker Farm," about the prison farm of the same name in Arkansas, a place that had been in the news since the late-1960s amid Arkansas' notorious prison scandals. Burns has since been critical of "Tucker Farm," though the song got the attention of the warden at Tucker, who invited him to play there. The B-side was "She Hasn't Been a Lady Very Long."

In 1972, Burns moved to Nashville, where he quickly made friends in the music industry. Lynn Owsley, steel guitarist for Ernest Tubb, helped Burns navigate the musical landscape in Music City. Burns signed with Wilderness Records, though his tenure there was not long. His next stop was working as a songwriter at Mel Tillis's Sawgrass Music, while keeping himself busy as a writer and performer. In 1973, he penned the up-tempo song "Be Alright Arkansas" for Connie Smith (a native of Indiana). At the time, Burns was also performing as Hank Williams at Opryland USA. In 1975, Mel Tillis featured a Burns song, "I Always Come Back to Loving You," on his record Mel Tillis and the Statesiders.

Until 1982, Burns had not released an album of his own songs. That changed with Ramblin' Gypsy, his first solo album, produced by Porter Wagoner. The album was not a commercial success, though existing copies are now collector's items. Burns did not record another solo record until the 1990s. Still, he remained popular, both in the music business and his home state. On March 27, 1983, then governor Bill Clinton declared it "Billy Don Burns Day." Burns spent much of the 1980s in Canada, a time he does not remember fondly. It was a period when he says he "lost" his family.

In 1990, Willie Nelson recorded Burns's song "(I Don't Have a Reason) to Go to California Anymore," an ironic title, given Burns's own love for California and frequent visits there over the years. The song was not a hit, though it added to Burns's credibility as an Outlaw-style songwriter. In 1995, he released Long Lost Highway, his first solo album since Ramblin' Gypsy. He followed it up with 1996's Desperate Men, recorded with his friend Hank Cochran. The record performed well on the Americana charts, rising higher than Johnny Cash's most recent record at the time, Unchained. Cash sent Burns letter of congratulations for Burns knocking him down the charts.

In the past few decades, Burns has released solo records with more regularity than at any point in his career. In 2015, he completed A Night in Room 8, an all acoustic album recorded in the hotel room in California where Gram Parsons died. Shooter Jennings worked as producer for the album. That same year, Burns was arrested and imprisoned in Kentucky for a drug conviction. Burns had been arrested for possession of amphetamines and given parole, provided he did not leave Kentucky. He did, and after a traffic stop in New Mexico, he was incarcerated for violating the conditions of his parole. Burns served a thirteen-month prison term.

Burns has struggled his entire adult life with drugs and alcohol, a problem that he has written about in his songs. He has attempted to kick drugs at professional rehab facilities, but with little long-term success. Burns's problems with addiction, and his love of being on the road, have affected his relationships. He has been married six times to five different women. In the 1980s, he was engaged to Nashville singer Lorrie Morgan. The couple never married, though they later collaborated on the 1984 track, "New Commitments." As of 2025, Burns is not married.

Since his release from prison, Burns has continued to record and tour, but with less frequency than he once did. He has, nevertheless, been embraced by younger country musicians such as Whey Jennings, Corb Lund, and Josh Morningstar. In 2016, he released Graveyard in Montgomery, a title that refers to his hero Hank Williams, who is buried in Montgomery, Alabama. It took seven years for Burns to release his next album, I've Seen a Lot of Highway.

== Discography ==
=== Albums ===
Year	Album	US Country	Label
1982	Ramblin' Gypsy	—	Gypsy Woman Records
1994	Long Lost Highway	-	Moreno Valley Music Group
1996	Desperate Men	—	Small Dog A-Barkin'
2001	Train Called Lonesome	-	Moreno Valley Music Group
2004	Heroes, Friends & Other Troubled Souls	-	Rust Records
2007	The Berlin Tapes	-	Rockin' H Records
2012	Nights When I'm Sober (Portrait of a Honky Tonk Singer)	-	Rusty Knuckles
2012	A Night in Room 8	-	BCR Los Angeles
2016	Graveyard in Montgomery	-	Rusty Knuckles
2020	The Country Blues	-	Country Rewind Records
2020	Brothers of the Music	-	Rusty Knuckles
2023	I've Seen a Lot of Highway	-	BCR Los Angeles
