= R419 road (Ireland) =

Road in Ireland

R419 road
- Bóthar R419
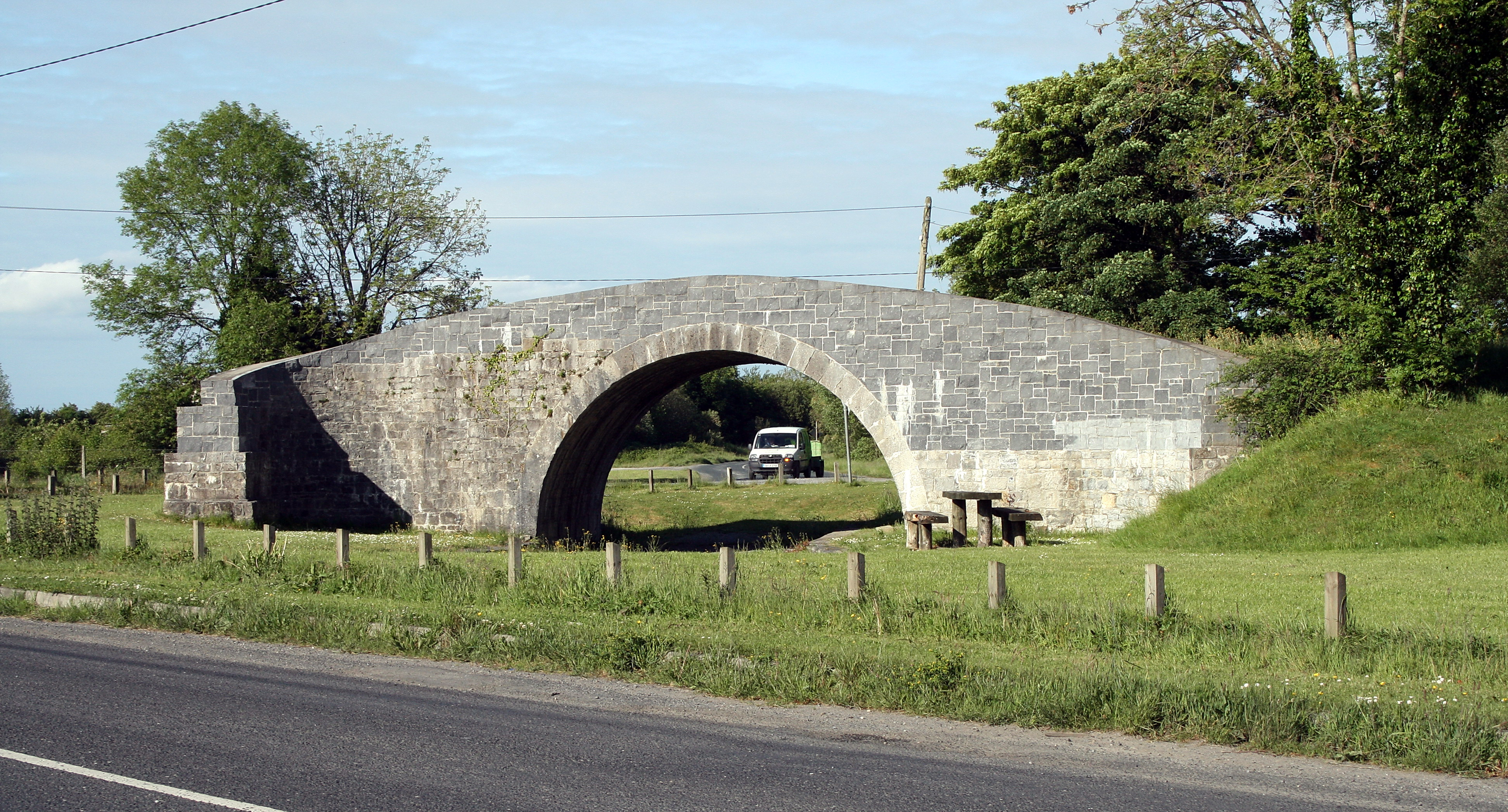
- Bridge over the filled-in Grand Canal, by-passed by R419 just south of Portarlington

Route information
- Length: 27 km (17 mi)

Location
- Country: Ireland
- Primary destinations: County Laois; Leaves the R445 5 km northeast of Portlaoise; (R422); Crosses the Dublin-Cork railway line; Crosses the Dublin – Athlone railway line; Portarlington – Crosses the River Barrow; County Offaly; Crosses the Grand Canal; Cushina – (R400), crosses the Cushina River; Bracknagh – (R442); County Kildare; Rathangan – terminates at the R401

Highway system
- Roads in Ireland; Motorways; Primary; Secondary; Regional

The R419 road is a regional road in Ireland, linking Portlaoise, County Laois to Portarlington to Rathangan, County Kildare. The route is 27 km (17 mi) long.

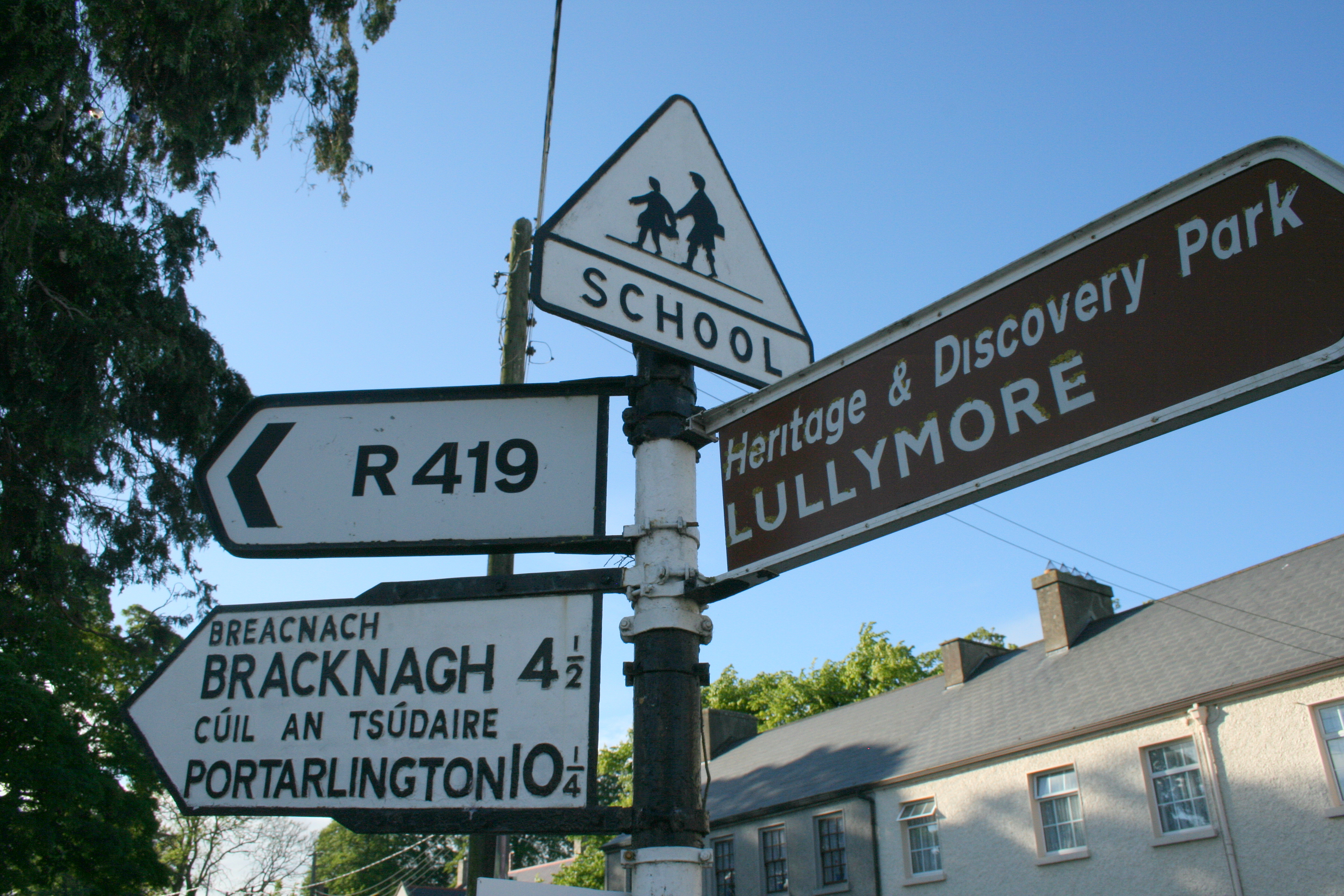
R419 in Rathangan mounted on old school hazard sign

== See also ==
- Roads in Ireland
- National primary road
- National secondary road
