= William A. Byrne =

Irish poet and educator

William A. Byrne (William Dara) 1872–1933 was an Irish poet and educator from Rathangan, Co. Kildare. He often wrote under the pen name William Dara.

He was educated at Carlow College as a lay student from 1885 to 1889, and went to Maynooth College to study for the priesthood, where he was invited to write an ode on the college's centenary; however, he left priestly formation due to ill health. After Maynooth he became a teacher in St Kieran's College, Kilkenny, and in St. Mary's Knockbeg College, Carlow, where he was Professor of English.

In 1916 became assistant professor of English at University College Dublin succeeding the executed Irish patriot Thomas MacDonagh and went on to be professor of English Literature at University College Galway. He died in Galway, on 13 May 1933, aged 59.

== Works ==
- A Light of the Broom - A collection of Poems by William A. Byrne(1901)
- The Bog Lands by William A. Byrne
- The Purple Heather by William A. Byrne
- Maynooth Centenary Ode by William A. Byrne, (1895).
- The Last Voyage by William Dara
- Song of a Turf-sod by William Dara
- Faces in the Night by William Dara
