= Collective buying power =

Collective buying power is the ability of a group of consumers or businesses to leverage the group size in exchange for discounts.

== In the marketplace ==
Many different companies have used this concept to build business plans. Warehouse clubs function in a similar way by offering products in bulk to consumers who pay membership fees. In the same sense, collective buying power is a cooperative approach to leveraging group size to benefit the consumer by offering

Internet companies have been leveraging this concept, bringing people together online. The company will arrange a coupon offering, that will only go into effect if more than a before agreed upon number are sold. Collective buying power is the ability of multiple individuals or groups to buy goods or services in bulk and at quite a discounted price. This is possible due to the sheer volume of buyers, which drives down prices and allows each group or individual to benefit from economies of scale. Collective buying power plays a good role in reducing costs, as it ensures that purchasing decisions are made with consideration for both quality and cost-saving measures.

== Dental industry example ==
One example of a business plan that uses collective buying power is found in the dental industry. Discount dental plans negotiate discounts for dental services on behalf of their members. Depending on the details, it may sometimes be considered a win-win scenario for the discount plan members (dental patients) and for dental care providers (dentists, hygienists, dental specialists, etc.). Patients benefit because they are receiving dental services at discounted rates. The benefit to dentists is that, even though they must offer their services at discounted rates under these plans, they are also likely to increase their patient volume. Depending on the size of the discount offered and the number of new patients, this may be financially beneficial for the dental providers.

However, such an arrangement could also result in downsides for both dental service providers and patients. Dentists may end up doing more work while earning the same amount of money. For example, without a discount plan, a dentist may charge $200 per treatment and provide the treatment to 50 patients, earning a total of $200/patient × 50 patients = $10,000. Under a discount plan, the dentist may charge only $125 per treatment, but can provide the treatment to 80 patients, earning a total of $125/patient × 80 patients = $10,000. Note that total earnings under the plan ($10,000) are the same as the earnings without the plan ($10,000). In other words, under the discount plan, the dentist is providing a greater number of services without any increase in earnings to go along with it.

There may also be a downside from the perspective of patients in a high-volume practice scenario like this: A dentist who needs to treat 80 patients instead of only 50, while being compensated the same total amount, will have less time and resources available to devote to each individual patient. This has the potential to become a situation of "quantity over quality", and patients might receive lower-quality care overall. In the U.S., the critical term "Medicaid mill" is sometimes used informally to describe dental or medical practices that compensate for low Medicaid reimbursement rates by seeing a high volume of patients.

== Similar terms ==
Collective buying power should not be confused with "purchasing power", "consumer purchasing power", or "collective purchasing power", which is a consumer's ability or a group of consumers' ability to buy goods and services as distinguished from the amount of money a consumer has.

It should also not be conflated with "buying power" or "consumer buying power", which has two definitions. The first, a consumer behavior definition, found in economic psychology implying the income available for discretionary spending among segments in the population. In short, it is a measure of the ability and willingness to buy goods or services. The second is an industrial definition, which refers to the relative influence an individual or a job function (engineering, purchasing, production) has in a purchasing decision. Power may be based on reward abilities (granting monetary or perceptual benefits), coercion, legitimacy, personality, or expertise.

== See also ==
- Procurement#Joint procurement
