= Monasterevin =

Town in County Kildare, Ireland

Monasterevin Mainistir Eimhín
- Town
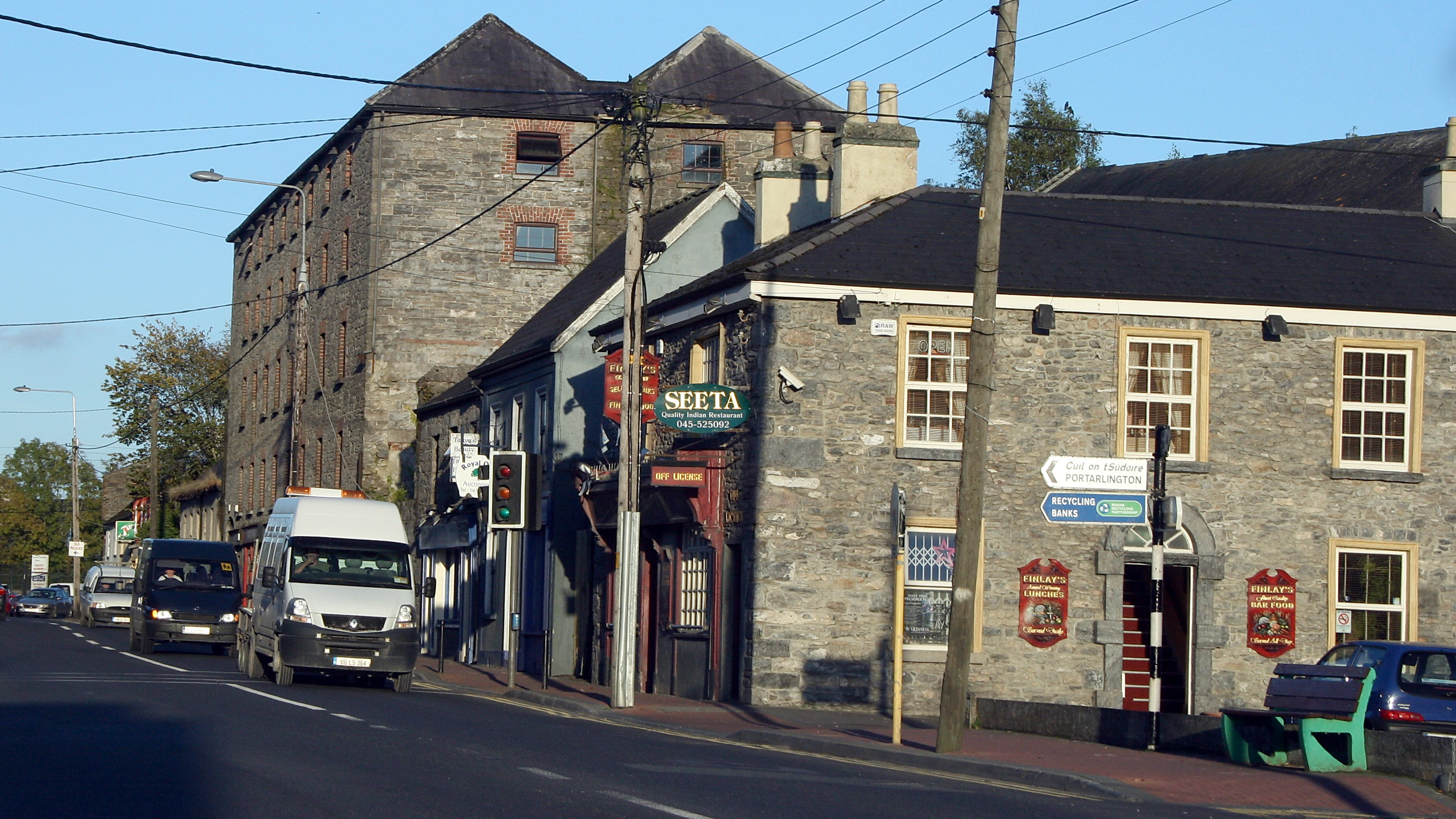

- Location in Ireland
- Coordinates: 53°08′19″N 7°03′39″W
- Country: Ireland
- Province: Leinster
- County: County Kildare

Area
  - Total: 3.4 km^{2} (1.3 sq mi)
- Elevation: 65 m (213 ft)

Population (2022)
  - Total: 5,307
  - Density: 1,600/km^{2} (4,000/sq mi)
- Irish Grid Reference: N624102

Monasterevin (/ˌmɑːnəstərˈɛvən/ MAH-nə-stər-EH-vən; Irish: Mainistir Eimhín), sometimes Monasterevan, is a town in County Kildare, Ireland. It lies on the River Barrow and the Barrowline, a canal branch of the Grand Canal. In the 20 years between the 2002 and 2022 censuses, the population more than doubled, from 2,583 to 5,307 inhabitants. The town is in a townland and civil parish of the same name.

== Location and access ==
Situated 63 km from Dublin on the R445 road, Monasterevin has been relieved of much through-traffic by the opening in 2004 of a section of the M7 motorway bypassing the town on the N7 Dublin-to-Limerick route. Monasterevin railway station is on InterCity rail lines for trains from Dublin to the southwest (Cork, Limerick and Tralee) and west (Galway and Mayo). The town is also on Ireland's canal network, linking the Grand Canal and the River Barrow.

== History ==
Historical population
| Year | Pop. | ±% |
|---|---|---|
| 1821 | 1,275 | — |
| 1831 | 1,441 | +13.0% |
| 1841 | 1,097 | −23.9% |
| 1851 | 996 | −9.2% |
| 1861 | 908 | −8.8% |
| 1871 | 1,040 | +14.5% |
| 1881 | 1,044 | +0.4% |
| 1891 | 939 | −10.1% |
| 1901 | 762 | −18.8% |
| 1911 | 732 | −3.9% |
| 1926 | 574 | −21.6% |
| 1936 | 580 | +1.0% |
| 1946 | 448 | −22.8% |
| 1951 | 415 | −7.4% |
| 1956 | 1,180 | +184.3% |
| 1961 | 1,273 | +7.9% |
| 1966 | 1,413 | +11.0% |
| 1971 | 1,619 | +14.6% |
| 1981 | 2,146 | +32.6% |
| 1986 | 2,143 | −0.1% |
| 1991 | 2,224 | +3.8% |
| 1996 | 2,302 | +3.5% |
| 2002 | 2,583 | +12.2% |
| 2006 | 3,017 | +16.8% |
| 2011 | 3,710 | +23.0% |
| 2016 | 4,246 | +14.4% |
| 2022 | 5,302 | +24.9% |

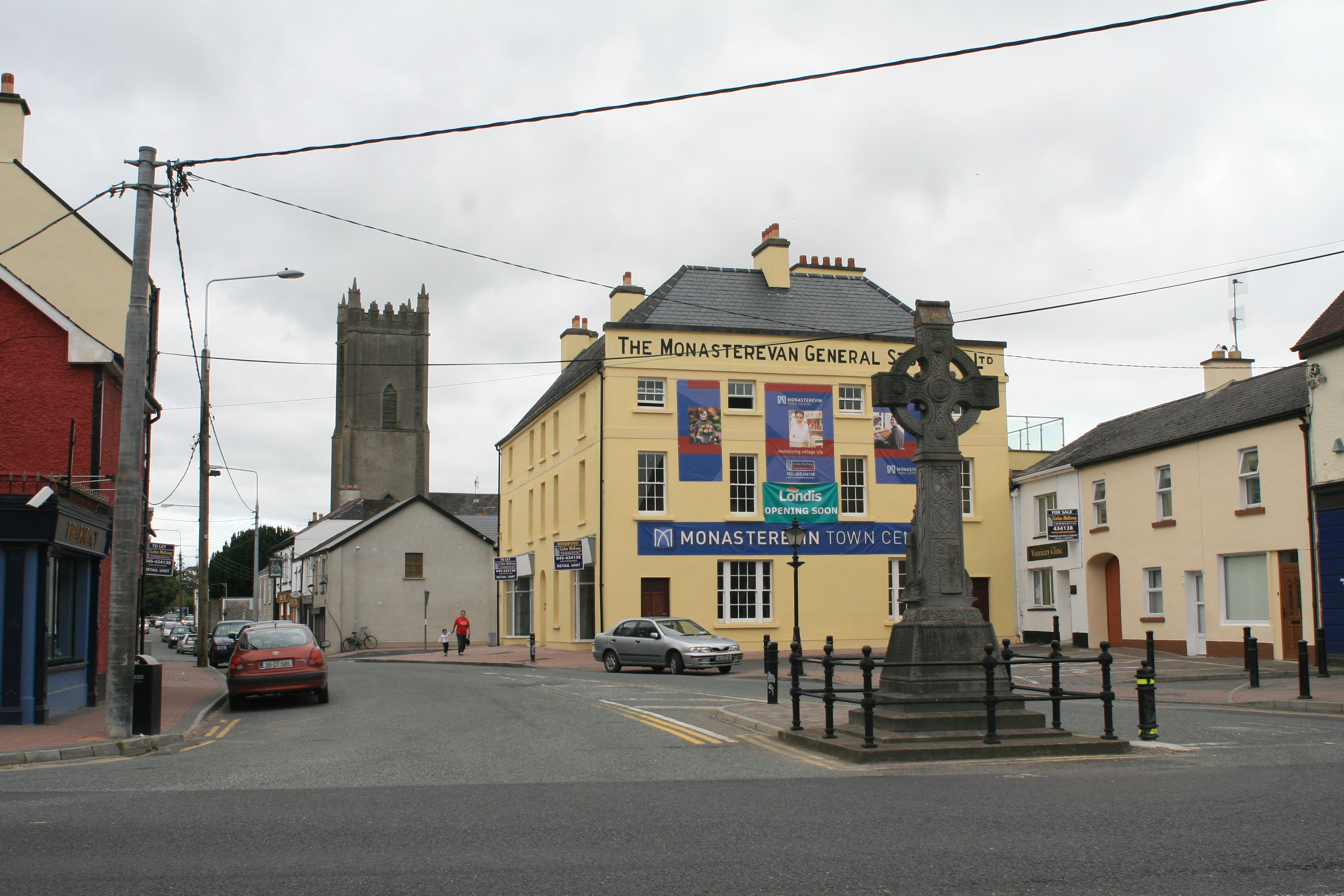
Town square with the Celtic Cross in memory of Father Prendergast

Monasterevin is situated on the border of County Kildare and County Laois. The towns and districts of Rathangan, Kildare, Portarlington and Athy surround the parish. The main geographical features of the countryside are the River Barrow, its tributaries, the extensive bogland and the limestone outcrop of Moore Abbey Hill.

=== Prehistoric times ===
In prehistoric times, glacial activity shaped the landscape. The meltwater from the retreating ice sheet formed outwash plains of gravel to the east and west. These are, of course, the Curragh and Heath. The land between is mainly limestone and proved an ideal path for the River Barrow, fed by its tributaries the Black and the Figile.

Evidence of the early Stone Age is sketchy but there are traces of Neolithic man in the area. A dolmen, now collapsed, once marked the burial of some important tribal potentate in a local townland. During the Barrow drainage, hundreds of stone axe heads were found on the river-bed at each of the three major crossing points that occur within the town. Their presence may indicate the importance of Monasterevin as a fording point on the mystical Baru. Neolithic travellers may have sacrificed the valuable axe heads to the spirit of the Barrow or Baru. Or they may have been placed in the shallow water to mark the significance of crossing the boundary between two peoples.

The Bronze Age in Monasterevin was the age of the small farmer, as evidenced by several earthwork enclosures. One such is the earthwork enclosure just above the town referred to as the Aquafort, resting as it does on the spit of land where the River Figile joins the River Barrow. At the time, it would have been in use the water level was much higher, meaning that approaching the defences was more difficult.

The pattern of fortified settlement continues into the Iron Age. We also know that by this time, the bogland around Monasterevin was fully formed. Traversing these areas would have been difficult, but the importance of the fords on the Barrow meant that some solution had to be found. The equivalent of the M7 motorway was needed, and indeed it was provided by what is known as "The Danes Road". It was built by laying large, rough-hewn planks and a foundation of brushwood on boggy ground. This base spread the weight of the gravel layer on top, allowing the roads to be used by chariots. St. Brigid is said to have ordered the construction of such a road.

=== Middle Ages ===
Saint Abban of New Ross, a contemporary of Saint Patrick, established a monastic settlement by the banks of the River Barrow at Rosglas and gave it into the charge of his protégé Evin (Éimhín; the name is a diminutive of the adjective eimh "swift, active", Latinized Eminus).

Saint Evin brought a number of monks with him from his native Munster. This gained the settlement the name Rosglos-na-Moinneach (the greenwood of the Munstermen). Saint Evin was politically astute; today, he would be called a spin doctor. He secured special status for the Monasterevin area, placing it outside the common law, making it a sanctuary. His famous bell was used for swearing oaths and was much in demand by tribes of the region for guaranteeing peace treaties. St. Evin also co-authored the "Tripartite Life of St. Patrick". Other writing by Evin survives, including the "Cain Emhin".

Although St. Evin's monastery died out about the time of the Viking raids in Ireland, its importance continued. In 903 AD, the Battle of Ballaghmoon was fought for the ownership of the church.

The next religious establishment on the site was in the 12th century when the Cistercian Abbey was founded under the patronage of Dermot O’Dempsey. This began a long connection with Mellifont in County Louth, the Cistercian motherhouse over all Ireland and Baltinglass in County Wicklow, the motherhouse of Monasterevin. At this time, the O’Dempseys were the rulers of the area, which was part of the territory of Clanmaliere. The O’Dempseys remained involved with the Abbey, providing the last abbot in Monasterevin, Hugh O’Dempsey.

Once again, the importance of Monasterevin as a crossing point on the Barrow asserted itself and the town came under the opposing influences of the O’Mores of Laois, the Hiberno-Norman Earls of Kildare and the English Pale. Abbots of Monasterevin, therefore, had to inherit St. Evin's talent for politics. Abbots of Monasterevin held a seat in the Irish Parliament while assisting outlaws and rebels against the crown of England.

By 1427, Rosglas had fallen on hard times and in 1541, the Abbey was handed over to Henry VIII of England as part of his reformation. He, in turn, leased it to his nobles. During the Elizabethan period, there were several occupants, including Sir Robert Devereux, Earl of Essex, after whom Essex Bridge is named (commonly called the Pass Bridge because he passed over it on his way to his disastrous campaign against the native Irish in Munster). It is not recorded whether he passed that way again on his way to be beheaded at the Tower of London.

=== Early Modern Era ===
King James I granted the Abbey and demesne of Rosglas at Monasterevin to Sir Adam Loftus in 1613. The Earls of Drogheda married into the Loftus family. Charles Lord Moore, Earl of Drogheda, married Jane Loftus in 1699. Their son Edward became the Fourth Earl, who sold the Mellifont estates and transferred the family seat to Monasterevin.

The coming of the Moores marks an important point in the history of Monasterevin. Its rise as the "Venice of Ireland" was encouraged by the many improvement works undertaken by the family and the influx of a mixed Protestant and Catholic merchant class. The First Earl had laid out the streets at the centre of Dublin, Drogheda Street (O'Connell Street), Moore Street, Henry Street, and Mary Street. His descendants continued this tradition of town planning by laying out the grid-pattern of the town with the parallel Main Street and Drogheda Street, which were connected by several crossing streets and lanes, some of which have disappeared.

Monasterevin has an unusual number of bridges, giving rise to its nickname of the Venice of Ireland. Arriving in 1786, the Grand Canal lends support to this name. Originally, the spur connecting the mainline to the Barrow in Athy was carried down the bank by locks into Barrow and up the other side.

The Grand Canal allowed the local distilling industry to flourish. The captains of this industry were the Cassidy Family, whose whisky and their St. Patrick Cross Pale Ale became world-famous. The wealth they acquired gave them considerable influence in the locality. In 1798, Cassidy was the local magistrate.

On 25 May 1798, insurgents from the surrounding countryside marched on the town of Monasterevin in an attempt to capture it. The Battle of Monasterevin took place in the Main Street opposite St. John's church, which had been fortified by local yeomanry and militiamen. A charge by the Monasterevin Yeomanry Cavalry routed the insurgents.

Later in the year, Fr. Edward Prendergast was arrested and condemned to death for ministering to the insurgents in their camp in Iron Hill near Nurney. He was hanged in the garden of Monasterevin House and buried there. Captain Padraig O’Bierne and a group of Derryoughter boatmen stole into the town under the cover of darkness and removed the body to his home place of Harristown.

=== Modern times ===
The 19th century was marked by further improvements to the town infrastructure, including the building of a new Town Bridge in 1832 and the arrival of the railway. The area was largely unaffected by the widespread mass evictions of the era, the Droghedas being generally regarded as good landlords. An aqueduct built in 1826 carries the Grand Canal over the River Barrow, preceded by a lift drawbridge where the R424 main road crosses the Barrowline branch of the Grand Canal, the only such main road bridge to do so on the Grand Canal. Monasterevin is noted for its unusually high number of bridges in such a small semi-rural area, earning it the name of the Venice of Ireland. The Great Famines of the 1840s also left the area relatively unscathed.

The poet Gerard Manley Hopkins visited the town on seven occasions.

In late May 2017, Monasterevin made the national news. Local people in the town on a Friday afternoon used social media to form a mob and ran a civil servant out of the town.

=== Birth of motor racing ===
On 2 July 1903, the Gordon Bennett Cup ran through Monsterevin. It was the first international motor race to be held in either Ireland or Great Britain. The Automobile Club of Great Britain and Ireland wanted the race to be hosted in Britain or Ireland, and Ireland was suggested as the venue because racing was illegal on British public roads. After some lobbying, Kildare was chosen, partly because the straightness of the roads was seen as a safety benefit. As a compliment to Ireland, the British team chose to race in Shamrock green^{[a]}, which thus became known as British racing green. The route consisted of several loops of a circuit that passed-through Kilcullen, Kildare, Monasterevin, Stradbally, Athy, Castledermot, and Carlow. The race started at the Ballyshannon crossroads near Calverstown. The 328 miles (528 km) race was won by the Belgian Camille Jenatzy, driving a Mercedes.

=== 20th century ===
The rise of Nationalism at the turn of the 20th century was well supported in the area. In 1900, a Celtic Cross style Monument in honour of Fr. Prendergast was erected by popular subscription of the Nationalists of the town and surrounding districts. During the Great War, many young men from the town and surrounding areas joined the Leinster Regiment and Connaught Rangers. Many died on the Western Front, and of those who returned, many were physically or physiological scarred.

During the War of Independence, the rail lines around Monasterevin and Kildangan were the chief targets of IRA action. The population suffered the attentions of the Black and Tans on their way down the country.

From 1925, Count John McCormack was the tenant of Moore Abbey. The world-famous tenor entertained many famous guests during his years in the house. As well as recording his albums in the Great Hall, one of the scenes from his film Song of My Heart was filmed on the grounds.

During the Emergency of 1939–45, Monasterevin prepared to defend itself against any aggressor by raising its own Local Defence Force, preparing its bridges for demolition, and building a pillbox to defend the town. The engineering works of Samuel E. Holmes produced grenades for the army.

In 1975, Monasterevin made international headlines. On the morning of 21 October, Gardaí surrounded a house in St. Evin's Park. Inside were the kidnappers of Dr. Tiede Herrema The "Siege at Monasterevin" lasted 17 days, ending on 7 November with the surrender of the kidnappers and the freedom of Dr. Herrema.

On 26 May 2017, an angry mob formed to run a Civil servant out of the town. The mob was formed using social media tools and claimed to believe that the man was a known paedophile, Anthony Luckwill (an older man with different coloured hair). Despite repeated Gardai assurances that it was mistaken identity, the civil servant was chased from a local business into a pub by 30 or so locals. The gardai then rescued him from the locals and sent him back to Dublin.

== Culture ==
From 1987 to 2015, a Gerard Manley Hopkins Literary Festival was held annually in the town, which the poet described as "one of the props and struts of my existence" whilst he was teaching in Dublin. It then moved to neighbouring Newbridge.

== Sport ==
Monasterevin G.F.C. is one of the local Gaelic Athletic Association football clubs, the others including Ballykelly GAA and Ros Glas hurling club.

Monasterevin is the birthplace of Wimbledon Tennis Champion Willoughby Hamilton.

== See also ==
- List of abbeys and priories in (County Kildare)
- List of towns and villages in Ireland
- Market Houses in Ireland

== Notes ==
a. According to Leinster Leader, Saturday, 11 April 1903, Britain had to choose a different colour to its usual national colours of red, white and blue, as these had already been taken by Italy, Germany and France respectively. It also stated red as the color for American cars in the 1903 Gordon Bennett Cup.
