= Offaly East =

Barony (administrative area) in County Kildare, Ireland

Offaly East Uíbh Fhailí Thoir (Irish)
- Barony
- Interactive map of Offaly East
- Sovereign state: Ireland
- County: Kildare

Area
  - Total: 190.32 km^{2} (73.48 sq mi)

Offaly East (Irish: Uíbh Fhailí Thoir; sometimes spelled Ophaly) is a barony in County Kildare, Ireland.

== Etymology ==
Offaly East takes its name from the Kingdom of Uí Failghe. It is not to be confused with County Offaly.

== Location ==
Offaly East is located in western County Kildare, containing much of The Curragh and the Bog of Allen.

== History ==
Offaly East was part of the ancient lands of the Ua Conchobhair Failghe (O'Connor Faly). As Lord of Clanmaliere the Ó Diomasaigh (O'Dempsey) held part of this barony. The Offaly barony was divided into west and east baronies before 1807.

== List of settlements ==
Below is a list of settlements in Offaly East:

- Kildare
- Rathangan
- Suncroft

== See also ==
Offaly West
