= Clonbullogue =

Village in County Offaly, Ireland

Clonbulloge Cluain Bolg
- Village
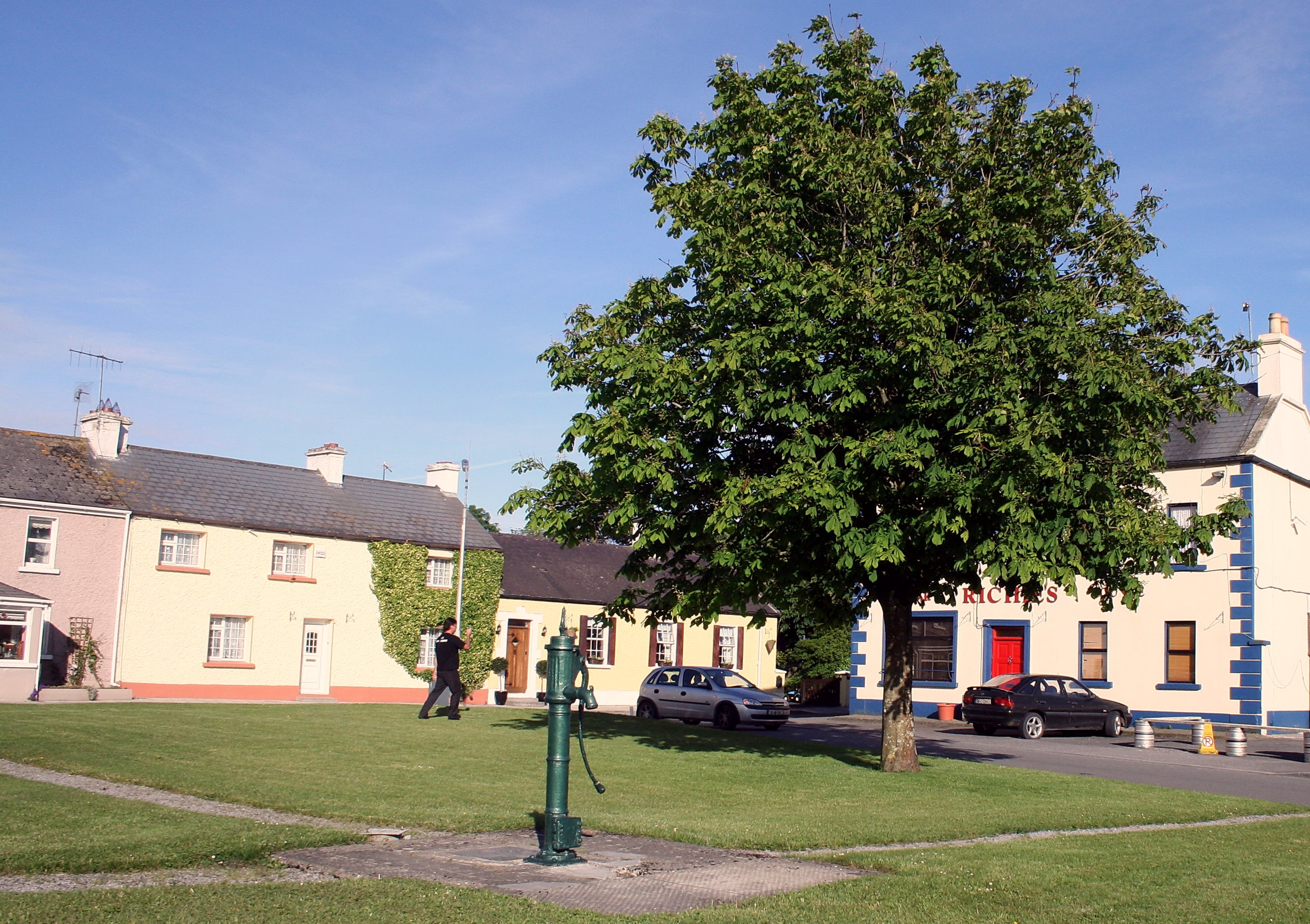
- Village pump and square in Clonbulloge

- Location in Ireland
- Coordinates: 53°15′36″N 7°05′11″W
- Country: Ireland
- Province: Leinster
- County: Offaly
- Elevation: 68 m (223 ft)

Population (2022)
  - Total: 401
- Time zone: UTC+0 (WET)
  - Summer (DST): UTC-1 (IST (WEST))
- Irish Grid Reference: N609236

Clonbullogue or Clonbolloge (Irish: Cluain Bolg, meaning 'bumpy meadow') is a village in County Offaly, Ireland. As of the 2022 census, the village had a population of 401 people.

== Geography ==
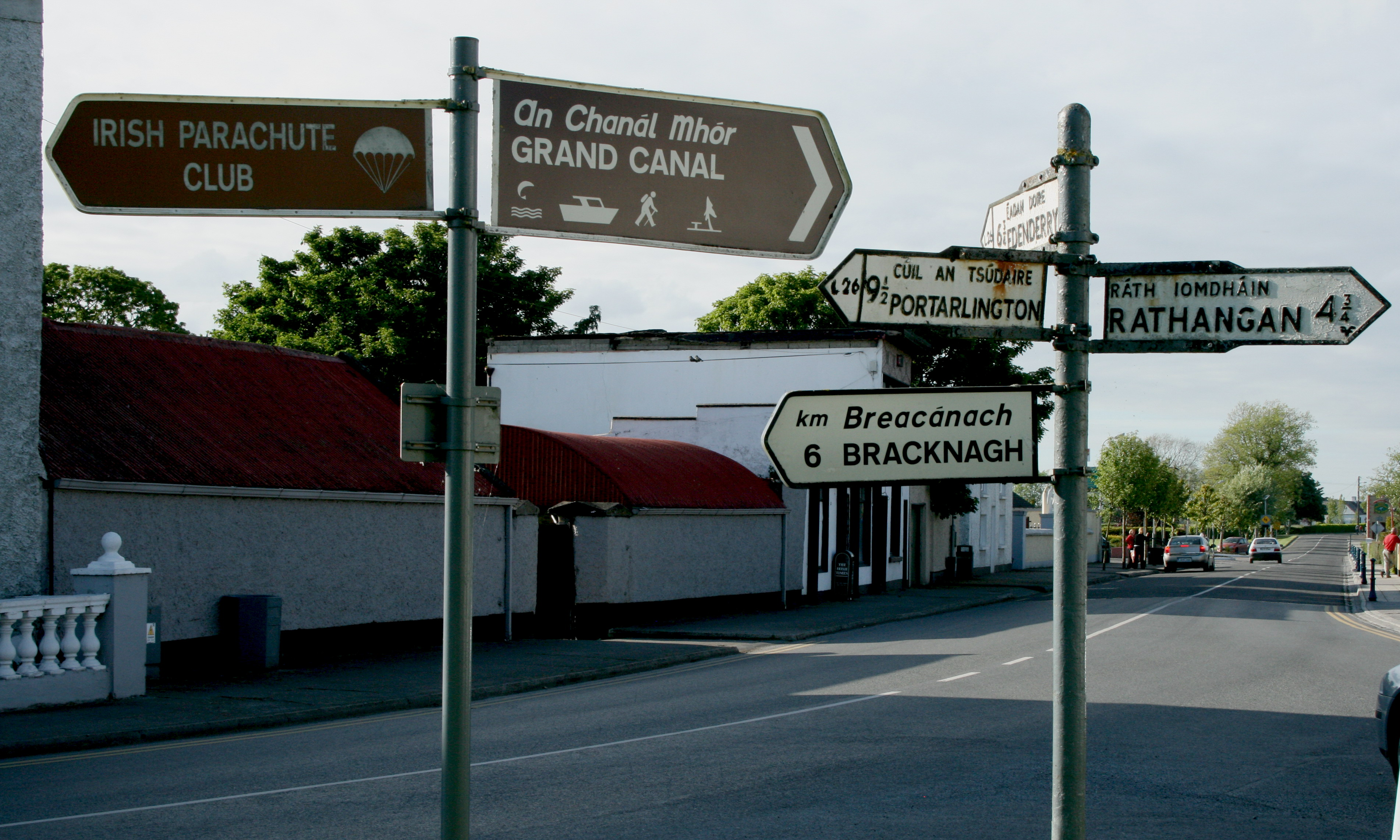
Road signs in Clonbulloge, looking north along the R401 towards the Bog of Allen

Clonbullogue is located near the point where three counties, County Offaly, County Laois and County Kildare, meet. Between the village and Edenderry, approximately 10 km (6 mi) to the north, lies the Bog of Allen. The village is on an "island" of pasture land alongside the bog. The place name Clonbulloge derives from the Irish Cluain Bolg, meaning "pasture of gaps" or "[meadow] of bumps".

Clonbullogue village is located at the junction of the R401 and R442 regional roads. The Figile River runs through the village under the R442 near its confluence with the Philipstown River.

== History ==
Evidence of ancient settlement in the area includes the Clonkeen stone. This standing stone is associated with a legend which suggests that the stone was thrown from Croghan Hill by Fionn MacCumhaill. Other nearby sites includes the remains of a togher (causeway) at Ballykilleen, the ruins of Cloncrane (Cloncreen) Church, a ring barrow at Shean and a sheela-na-gig from Ballynowlart and Clonsast.

The area is marked on the 1653 Cottonian map of Leix and Offaly as "Clanbolg". In the 1659 census, Robert Shallcross was listed as the titled person in the area. In 1679, Charles II granted this area to the Purefoy family and for a time the area was known as "Purefoy's Place". The local Church of Ireland (Anglican) church, Saint Kevin's Church in Clonsast townland, was built c. 1670.

Clonbullogue village was during the 1798 Rebellion. It was the only part of Offaly to suffer this fate during the period. Two of the Wexford leaders, Colonel Anthony Perry and Father Mogue Kearns were captured here and were later hanged at Edenderry for their part in the rebellion.

The Catholic parish church, within the village in Clonbullogue townland, was built c. 1820. Writing in 1883, Father Michael Comerford (who later become Coadjutor Bishop of Kildare and Leighlin) wrote of the village that it was "situated on the Little Barrow" and that, in the late 19th century, it "present[ed] a decayed and ruinous appearance, some of the larger houses having been burned during the rebellion of 1798".

During the 1950s, the village grew as workers were employed by Bórd na Móna to harvest peat from the area's bogs.

== Clonbullogue airfield ==
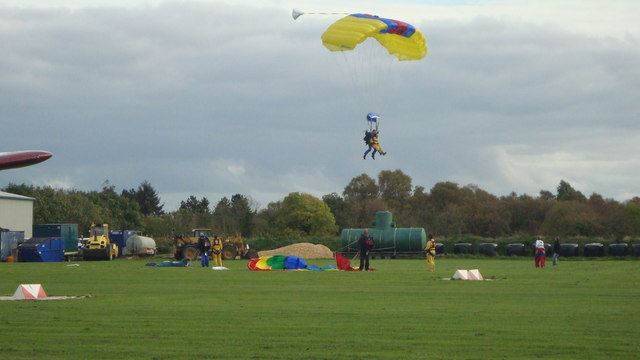
Irish Parachute Club at Clonbullogue airfield

Clonbullogue Airfield is owned and operated by the Irish Parachute Club. The airfield has one east–west grass strip runway which is 770m long and 18m wide. There are six aircraft based on the field, most of them owned by the Irish Parachute Club. The airfield is located about 2 km (1.2 mi) west of Clonbullogue village and lies under a restricted airspace designated EI-R16. On 13 May 2018, a plane from this airfield carrying 16 parachutists crashed, killing the pilot and a seven-year-old boy.

== Sport ==
The local Gaelic Athletic Association (GAA) club, Clonbullogue GAA, has won a number of Offaly Junior Football Championship titles, and won the Offaly Intermediate Football Championship in 2021. Clonbullogue's association football (soccer) club, Saint Patricks, won the Division 2 league in 2004.

== Demographics ==
With the conquest of Ireland from the Cromwellian wars onwards, Clonbullogue was extensively planted. Quaker families were common under the plantations and some present-day local family names reflect these plantations.

In the mid-19th century, the village population suffered declines from famine, poverty and emigration. In 1861, the population of the village was 110, and by 1871 had fallen to 79.

As of the 2016 census, the population of the village was 436. By 2022, the population was 401.

== Notable people ==
- Alex Dunne (b.2005), racing driver who has competed in the FIA Formula 2 Championship

== See also ==
- List of towns and villages in Ireland
