= Firceall =

Ancient Gaelic Irish territory

Firceall (Irish pronunciation: [ˈfʲɪɾʲcəl̪ˠ]) was an ancient Gaelic Irish territory which formed the most south - westerly part of the ancient Kingdom of Meath. O'Molloy was chieftain of the territory. Firceall itself comprised the ancient baronies of Ballycowan, Ballyboy and Eglish, which are located in modern day mid County Offaly extending from Durrow north of Tullamore to Eglish on the edge of Birr in an area which is some 25 miles in length by 5 miles in width. The name Firceall comes from the Irish words Fir Ceala meaning Men of the Churches.

== Details ==
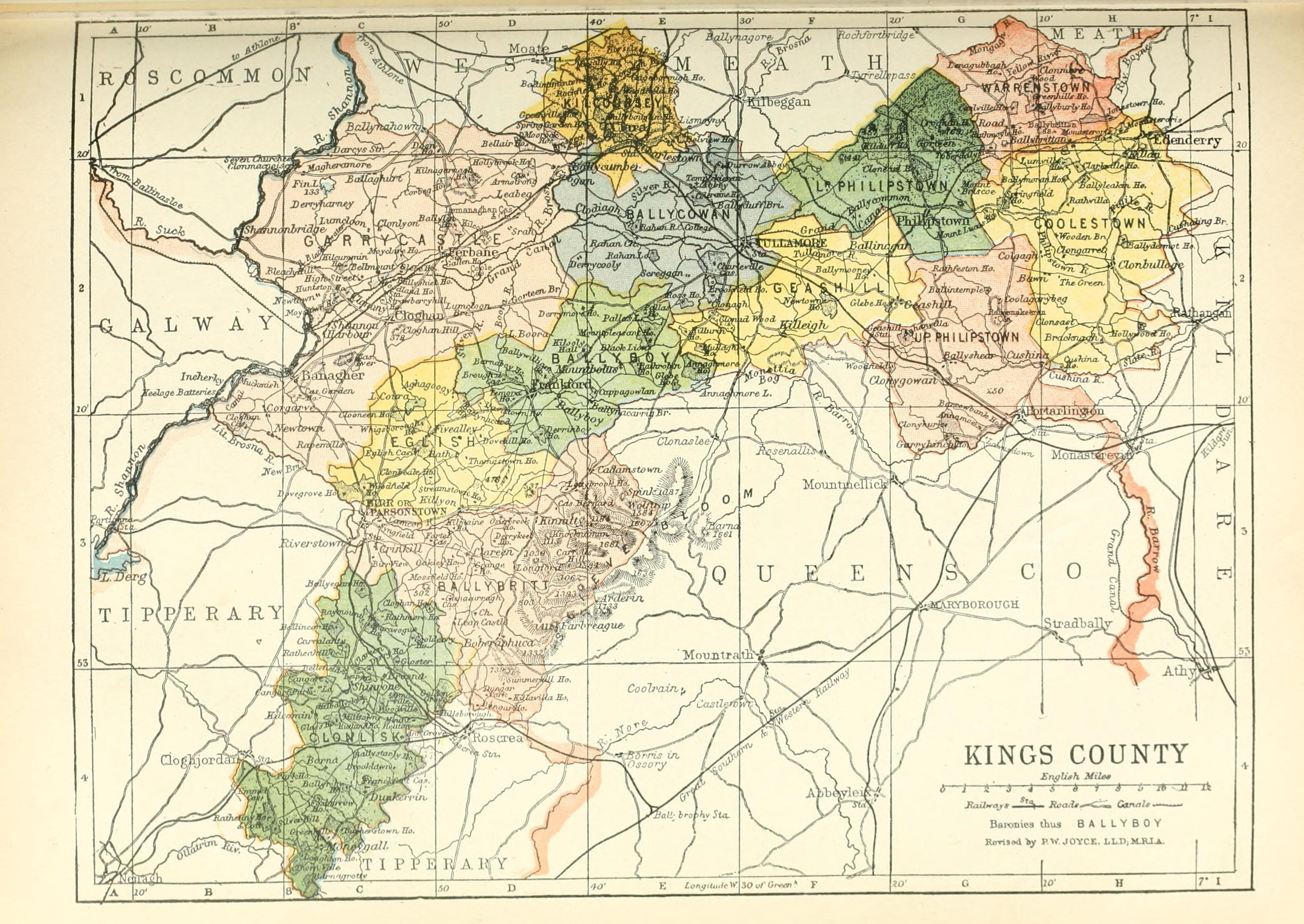
Baronies of Offaly

O'Molloy claimed descent from Niall of the Nine Hostages who ruled Tara from 380 - 405.

Firceall formed land boundaries with a number of major ancient Irish Gaelic Kingdoms. A land boundary was formed with Éile (Ely) of the Kingdom of Munster just east of Birr. Near Tullamore, another land boundary with Uí Failghe (anglicised as Offaly) of the Kingdom of Leinster was formed. Firceall also formed a land boundary with the territory of Delbhna bEthra ruled by MacCoughlan. Delbhna bEthra was also allied with Meath.

Under the Plantations of Ireland Firceall was broken up into the Baronies of Eglish, Ballyboy and Ballycowen and these were located in the then newly formed King's County which later became known as County Offaly (named after the ancient territory of Uí Failghe) following Irish independence.

During its existence, Firceall was the location of a number of ancient abbeys and castles. The church at Lynally (near Tullamore) formed the parish church until the foundation of parish churches at Rahan, Killoughey, Ballyboy, Drumcullen and Eglish. A number of known ancient abbeys were located at Drumcullen, Killyon, Kilcormac & Rahan.

== See also ==
- Kingdom of Meath
- Kilcormac
- Tullamore
- Ballyboy
- Rath, County Offaly
