= Eglish (barony) =

Eglish An Eaglais (Irish)
- Barony
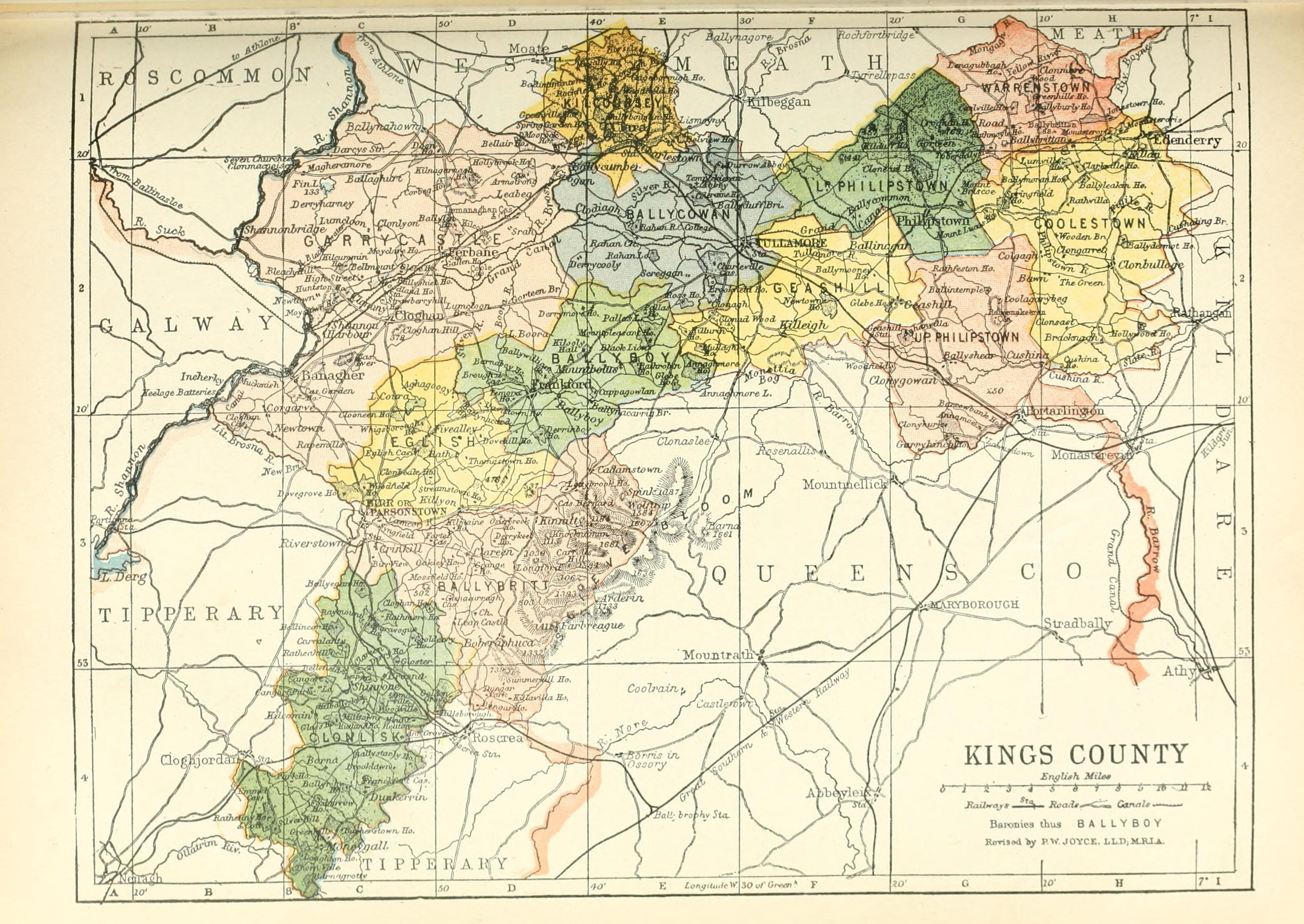
- Baronies of County Offaly. Eglish is shaded yellow.
- Sovereign state: Ireland
- County: Offaly

Area
  - Total: 116.13 km^{2} (44.84 sq mi)

Eglish (Irish: An Eaglais), also called Fercale (Fir Ceall) is a barony in County Offaly (formerly King's County), Ireland.

== Etymology ==
The names Eglish (An Eaglais, "the church") and Fercale (Fir Ceall, "men of the churches") both refer to churches.

== Location ==
Eglish is located in west County Offaly. It contains Lough Coura.

== History ==
Eglish was territory of the Ó Maolmhuaidh (O'Molloy) of the Southern Uí Néill, prince of Firceall (Fir Cell, "men of the churches"). During its existence Firceall was the location of a number of ancient abbeys and castles. The church at Lynally (near Tullamore) formed the parish church until the foundation of parish churches at Rahan, Killoughey, Ballyboy, Drumcullen and Eglish. A number of known ancient abbeys were located at Drumcullen, Killyon, Kilcormac and Rahan.

== List of settlements ==
Below is a list of settlements in Eglish:

- Rath
