= Rath, County Offaly =

Rath An Ráth
- Hamlet
- Location in Ireland
- Coordinates: 53°08′18″N 7°48′28″W
- Country: Ireland
- Province: Leinster
- County: Offaly
- Elevation: 68 m (223 ft)
- Time zone: UTC+0 (WET)
  - Summer (DST): UTC-1 (IST (WEST))
- Irish Grid Reference: N 128 097

Rath (Irish: An Ráth, meaning 'the ringfort') is a hamlet in the south west area of County Offaly, Ireland. The hamlet is located midway between the towns of Birr and Kilcormac on a northeast–southwest country road. It is located in the parish of Eglish and Drumcullen which is in the Roman Catholic Diocese of Meath. The hamlet has a number of local amenities for the local population including a church (dedicated to St. John the Baptist), a national school, a local community centre and a local shop. Drumcullen GAA is the local GAA club and is located about half a kilometre to the south of the hamlet.

As the place-name suggests, Rath takes its name from the Irish word 'An Ráth' which means ringfort. Ringforts are circular fortified settlements with some dating as far back as the Iron Age (800 BCE–400 CE). There is no evidence of a ringfort at the present day hamlet, however there are remains of one at nearby Mullinafawnia, a few kilometres south west of the hamlet. Nearby, about 300 metres from the hamlet, is a hill called Rathmount where the local rath may have been.

In Gaelic Ireland, Rath was located in the territory of Firceall, of the Kingdom of Meath. The O'Molloy clan were chieftains of the territory and had a castle in nearby Eglish (the remains of which are still visible today). Following the plantations of Offaly in the 16th century, Firceall was broken up into the Baronies of Ballycowan, Ballyboy and Eglish.

The present day hamlet developed around the old Bennett Estate located in Thomastown, just south of the hamlet which gave regular local employment from the mid-1700s. The present day Catholic church in Rath was built by the family. The Bennett family is an unusual case in being a Catholic landlord family during the times of the Protestant Ascendancy of Ireland.

Employment in the area is mainly agricultural however there are a number of industries also. Grennans is a family owned agri-trading business in the hamlet providing much employment. The business mainly deals with the manufacturing and distribution, of animal feeds, farm fertilisers and agricultural seeds and also sell agrochemicals, farm hardware and farm plastics. Bord na Mona also have a large briquette factory nearby in Derrinlough.

Nearby villages include Fivealley about 3 km. to the north which is on the N52 motorway and Killyon about 3 km. to the south on R-440, both of which are located within the same parish. Eglish Castle and the Church of Saint James, Eglish, are located about 3 km. to the west.

The site of the once celebrated monastery of Drumcullen is located southeast of the hamlet. The remains of the old church and high cross date back to the early Christian Ireland. Killyon was also the site of an ancient convent founded by Saint Liadhain. It is believed to be linked to the ancient monastery of Seir Kieran.

== People ==
- William Bulfin, Derrinlough (author)
- Eamon Bulfin, Derrinlough (Republican activist during 1916 Rising, raised the Irish Tricolour over the GPO and is buried in Eglish cemetery).
