= R437 road (Ireland) =

Road in Ireland

R437 road
- Bóthar R437
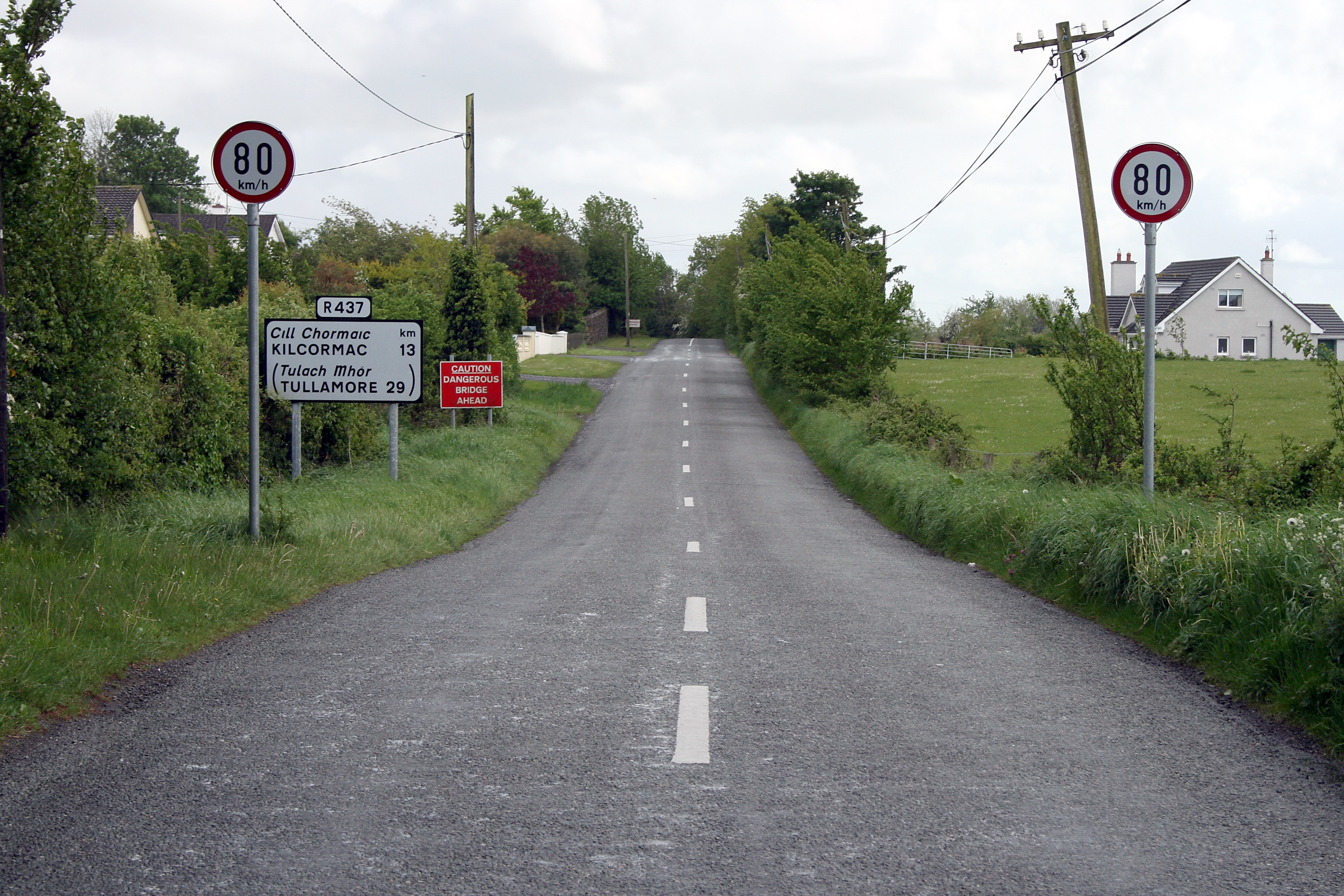
- R437 leaving the N62 near Ferbane

Route information
- Length: 13 km (8.1 mi)

Location
- Country: Ireland
- Primary destinations: County Offaly; N62 south of Ferbane; Cross the Grand Canal; (R357); Cross the Silver River; Through Boora Bog; Kilcormac, terminates at the N52

Highway system
- Roads in Ireland; Motorways; Primary; Secondary; Regional

The R437 road is a regional road in Ireland which runs northwest-southeast from the N62 near Ferbane, County Offaly to the N52 in Kilcormac, County Offaly. The route is 13 km (8.1 mi) long.

== See also ==
- Roads in Ireland
- National primary road
- National secondary road
