= Ballyboy (disambiguation) =

Ballyboy may refer to several places in Ireland:

- Ballyboy, a village in County Offaly
- Ballyboy (barony), a barony in County Offaly
- Ballyboy, County Westmeath, a townland in Portloman civil parish, barony of Corkaree, County Westmeath
- Ballyboy also refers to several other townlands in the Republic of Ireland

== See also ==
- Ballyboylands Lower, a townland in County Antrim, Northern Ireland
- Ballyboylands Upper, a townland in County Antrim, Northern Ireland
