= Ballycowan (barony) =

Ballycowan Baile Mhic Comhainn (Irish)
- Barony
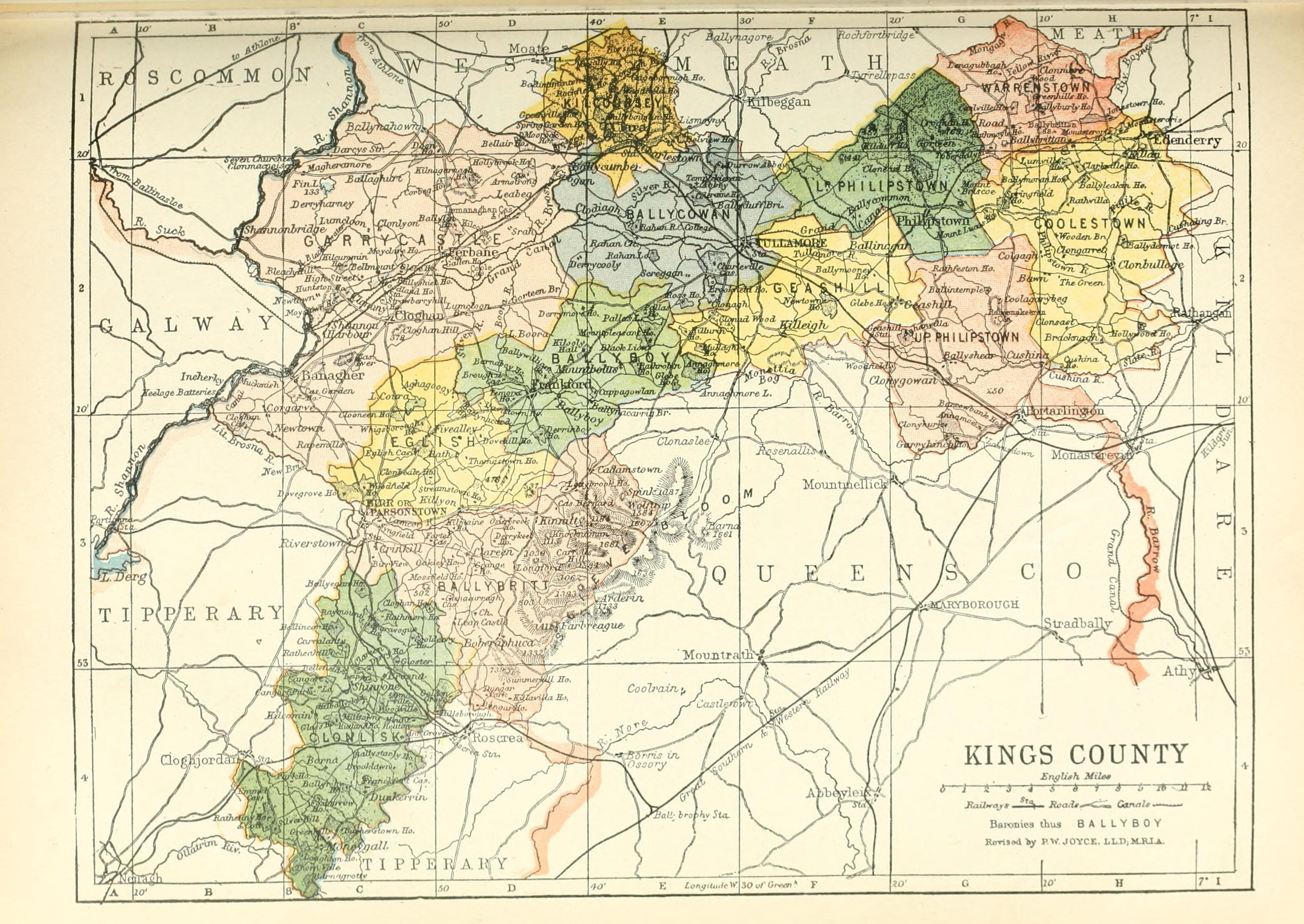
- Baronies of County Offaly. Ballycowan is shaded blue.
- Sovereign state: Ireland
- County: Offaly

Area
  - Total: 156.25 km^{2} (60.33 sq mi)

Ballycowan or Ballycowen (Irish: Baile Mhic Comhainn) is a barony in County Offaly (formerly King's County), Ireland.

== Etymology ==
Ballycowan derives its name from Ballycowan Castle (near Tullamore) and the townland of Ballycowan (Irish Baile Mhic Comhainn, "settlement of Mac Comhainn").

== Location ==
Ballycowan is located in north County Offaly, around the valleys of the Clodiagh River and Silver River.

== History ==
Ballycowan was part of the territory of the Ó Maolmhuaidh (O'Molloy) sept of the Southern Uí Néill. The Uí Shuanaig (Fox?) sept is cited here near Rathan.

== List of settlements ==
Below is a list of settlements in Ballycowan:

- Durrow
- Rahan
- Screggan
- Tullamore
