= Fiodhairle Ua Suanaigh =

Irish abbot and saint (8th century)

Saint Fiodhairle Ua Suanaigh
- Residence: Rahan, County Offaly
- Died: 762
- Feast: 1 October

Saint Fiodhairle Ua Suanaigh (or Fidharleus, Fidarle, Fidairle, died 762) was an Irish abbot who was considered to be a saint. His feast day is 1 October.

== Life ==
Fiodhairle Ua Suanaigh was an 8th-century abbot of the monastery in Rahan, County Offaly. He is said to have belonged to the Hy Fiachrach family, as did Saint Colman of Kilmacduach, and to have been a brother to Fiodhmuine Ua Suanaigh. The Bollandists refer to Colgan and give his feast day as 1 October. The Martyrology of Tallaght also says his feast day was 1 October. The Martyrology of Marianus O'Gorman says he was a "white-fair prince" and notes his Suanach descent and Rathen abbey. The 17th-century Martyrology of Donegal says he died in 762.

Older spellings of the Rahan abbey name are Rathen, Raithen and Raithean, meaning "ferney place". The O'Swany (Ua Suanaigh) family were the hereditary successors to Saint Carthage at the abbey from the 8th century. Fiodhairle repaired the abbey after a Viking raid.

== Monks of Ramsgate account ==
The monks of St Augustine's Abbey, Ramsgate, wrote in their Book of Saints (1921),

FIDHARLEUS (St.) Abbot (October 1)
(8th century) An Irish Saint, the second founder of Rathin Abbey. He died A.D. 762.

== Butler's account ==
The hagiographer Alban Butler wrote in his Lives of the fathers, martyrs, and other principal saints,

Saint Fidharleus of Ireland, Abbot. The Irish calendars commemorate on this day Saint Fidharleus, abbot of Raithen, who departed to our Lord in 762. See Colgan, MSS.

== Sources ==
- Butler, Alban, 1711-1773; Butler, Charles, 1750-1832 (1842), The lives of the fathers, martyrs, and other principal saints : compiled from original monuments and other authentic records : illustrated with the remarks of judicious modern critics and historians, vol. 10, Derby: Richardson and Son
- Marcella, "Saint Fidarle of Rahan, October 1", Omnium Sanctorum Hiberniae
- O'Hanlon, John (1875), Lives of the Irish saints This article incorporates text from this source, which is in the public domain.
- "Saint Fidharleus", CatholicSaints.info
- St. Augustine's Abbey, Ramsgate (1921), The Book of saints : a dictionary of servants of God canonized by the Catholic Church, London: A. & C. Black, ltd. This article incorporates text from this source, which is in the public domain.
