= Ballyboy (barony) =

Ballyboy Baile Átha Buí (Irish)
- Barony
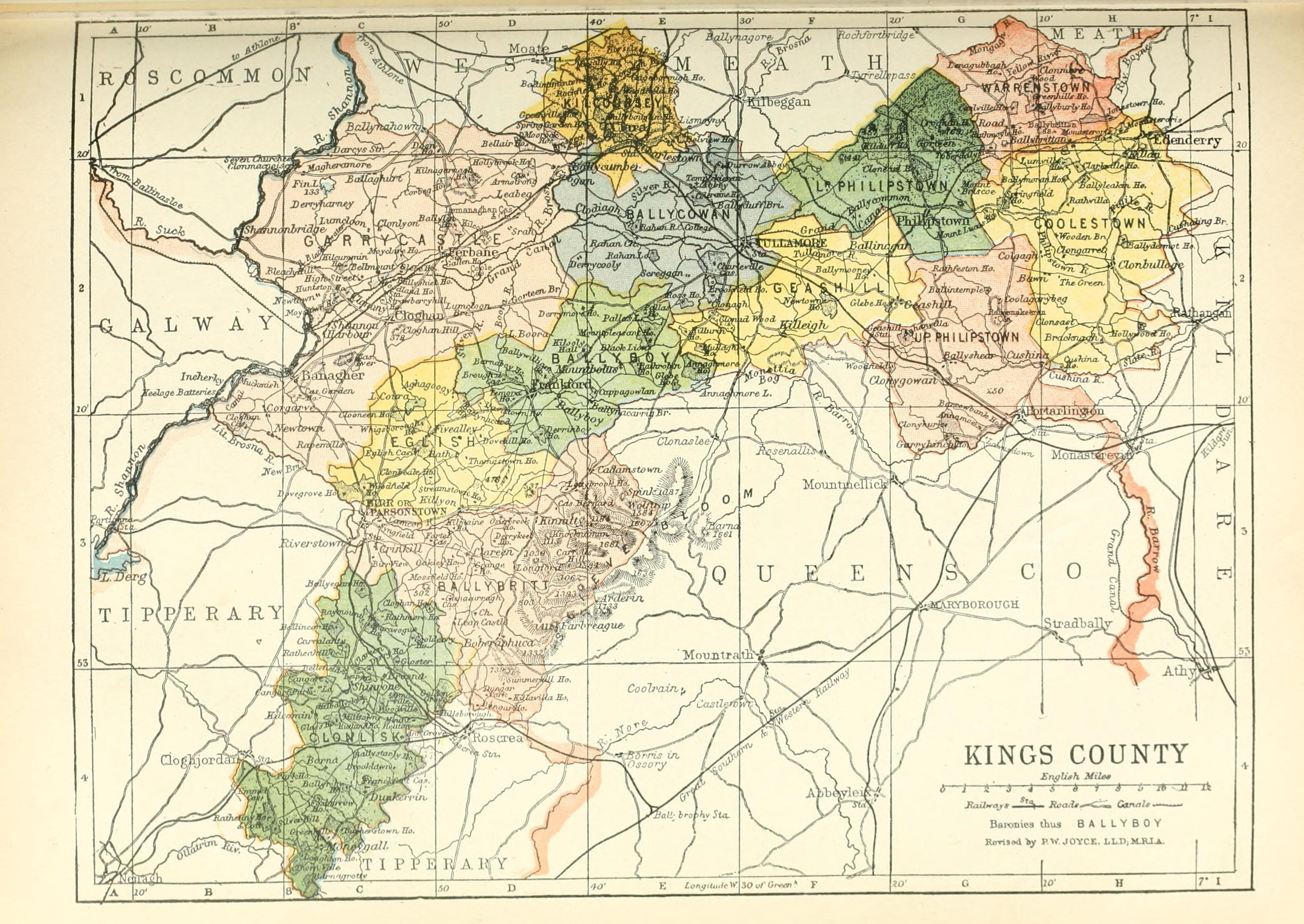
- Baronies of County Offaly. Ballyboy is shaded pale green.

- Location in Ireland
- Coordinates: 53°11′32″N 7°39′58″W
- Sovereign state: Ireland
- County: Offaly

Area
  - Total: 131.11 km^{2} (50.62 sq mi)

Ballyboy (Irish: Baile Átha Buí) is a barony in County Offaly (formerly King's County), Ireland.

== Etymology ==
Ballyboy barony derives its name from the village of Ballyboy (Irish Baile Átha Buí, "settlement of the yellow ford").

== Location ==
Ballyboy barony is located in central County Offaly. The Silver River flows through it.

== List of settlements ==
Below is a list of settlements in Ballyboy barony:

- Ballyboy
- Kilcormac
- Mountbolus
