= County Offaly =

County in Ireland

Coordinates: 53°15′N 7°30′W

County Offaly Contae Uíbh Fhailí
- County
- Coat of arms
- Nickname: The Faithful County
- Motto: Esto Fidelis (Latin) "Be Faithful"
- Interactive map of County Offaly
- Country: Ireland
- Province: Leinster
- Region: Eastern and Midland
- Established: 1556
- County town: Tullamore

Government
  - Local authority: Offaly County Council
  - Dáil constituencies: Offaly
  - EP constituency: Midlands–North-West

Area
  - Total: 2,001 km^{2} (773 sq mi)
  - Rank: 18th
- Highest elevation (Arderin): 527 m (1,729 ft)

Population (2022)
  - Total: 83,150
  - Rank: 24th
  - Density: 41.55/km^{2} (107.6/sq mi)
- Time zone: UTC±0 (WET)
  - Summer (DST): UTC+1 (IST)
- Eircode routing keys: R35, R42, R45 (primarily)
- Telephone area codes: 046, 057 (primarily)
- ISO 3166 code: IE-OY
- Vehicle index mark code: OY
- Website: Official website

County Offaly (/ˈɒfəli/; Irish: Contae Uíbh Fhailí) is a county in Ireland. It is part of the Eastern and Midland Region and the province of Leinster. It is named after the ancient Kingdom of Uí Failghe. It was formerly known as King's County, in honour of Philip II of Spain, who was at the time King of Ireland by jure uxoris. Offaly County Council is the local authority for the county. The county population was 82,668 at the 2022 census.

== Geography and political subdivisions ==
Offaly is the 18th largest of Ireland's 32 counties by area and the 24th largest in terms of population. It is the fifth largest of Leinster's 12 counties by size and the tenth largest by population.

=== Physical geography ===
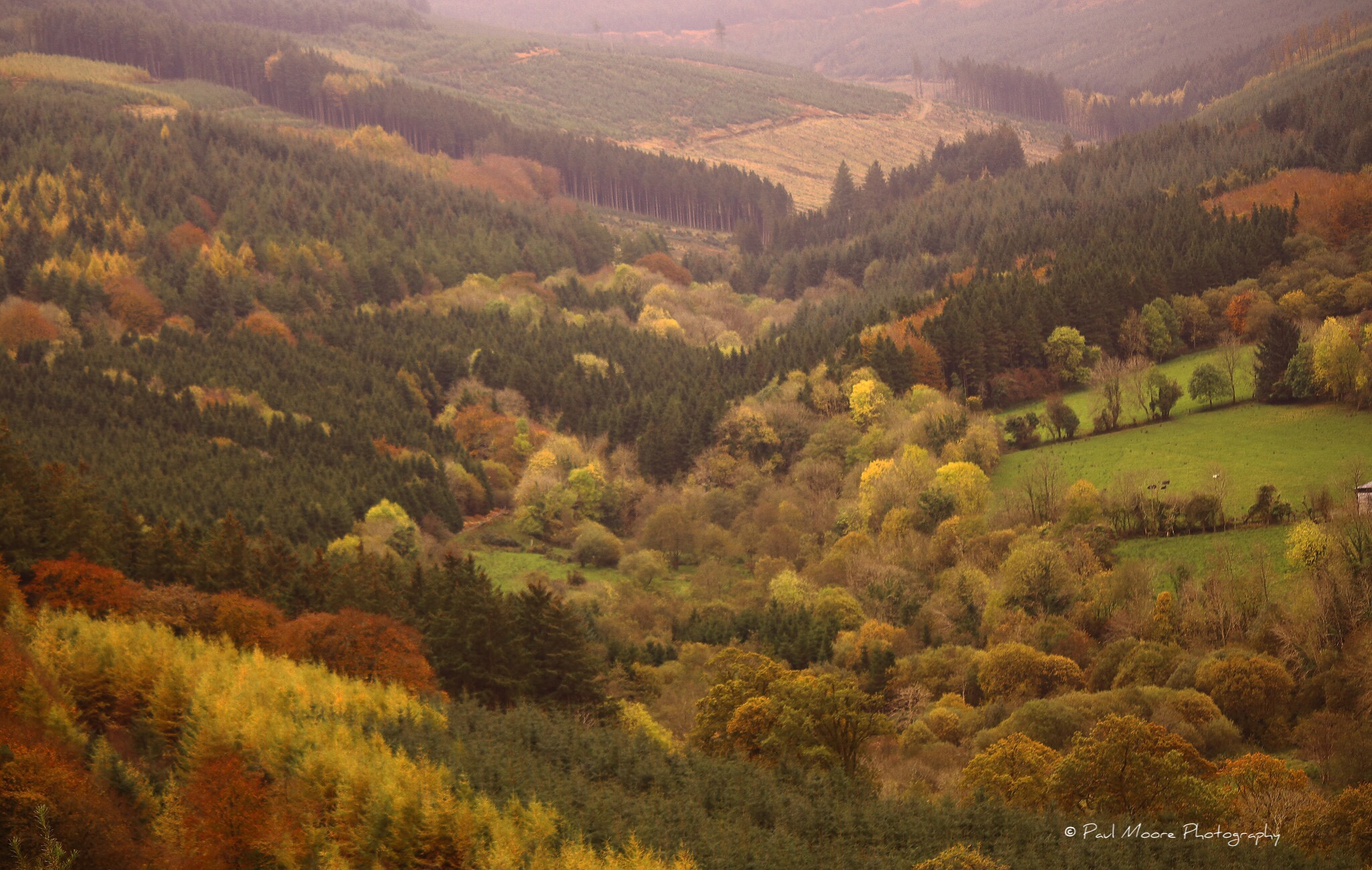
The Slieve Bloom Mountains

Tullamore is the county town and largest town in Offaly and is the 30th largest in Ireland. Offaly borders seven counties: Galway, Roscommon, Tipperary, Laois, Westmeath, Kildare, and Meath. The Slieve Bloom Mountains are in the southern part of the county on the border with County Laois. Offaly has the 24th-highest county peak in Ireland. The highest point is Arderin (Irish: Ard Éireann) in the Slieve Blooms at 527 metres (1,729 feet). The Slieve Bloom Mountains contain the county's highest points including Stillbrook Hill and Wolftrap Mountain which are, respectively, the county's second- and third-highest peaks. Croghan Hill rises from the Bog of Allen and is located in northern Offaly. Although only 234 m (768 ft) high, it is known for its view over the surrounding area and it stands out by itself.

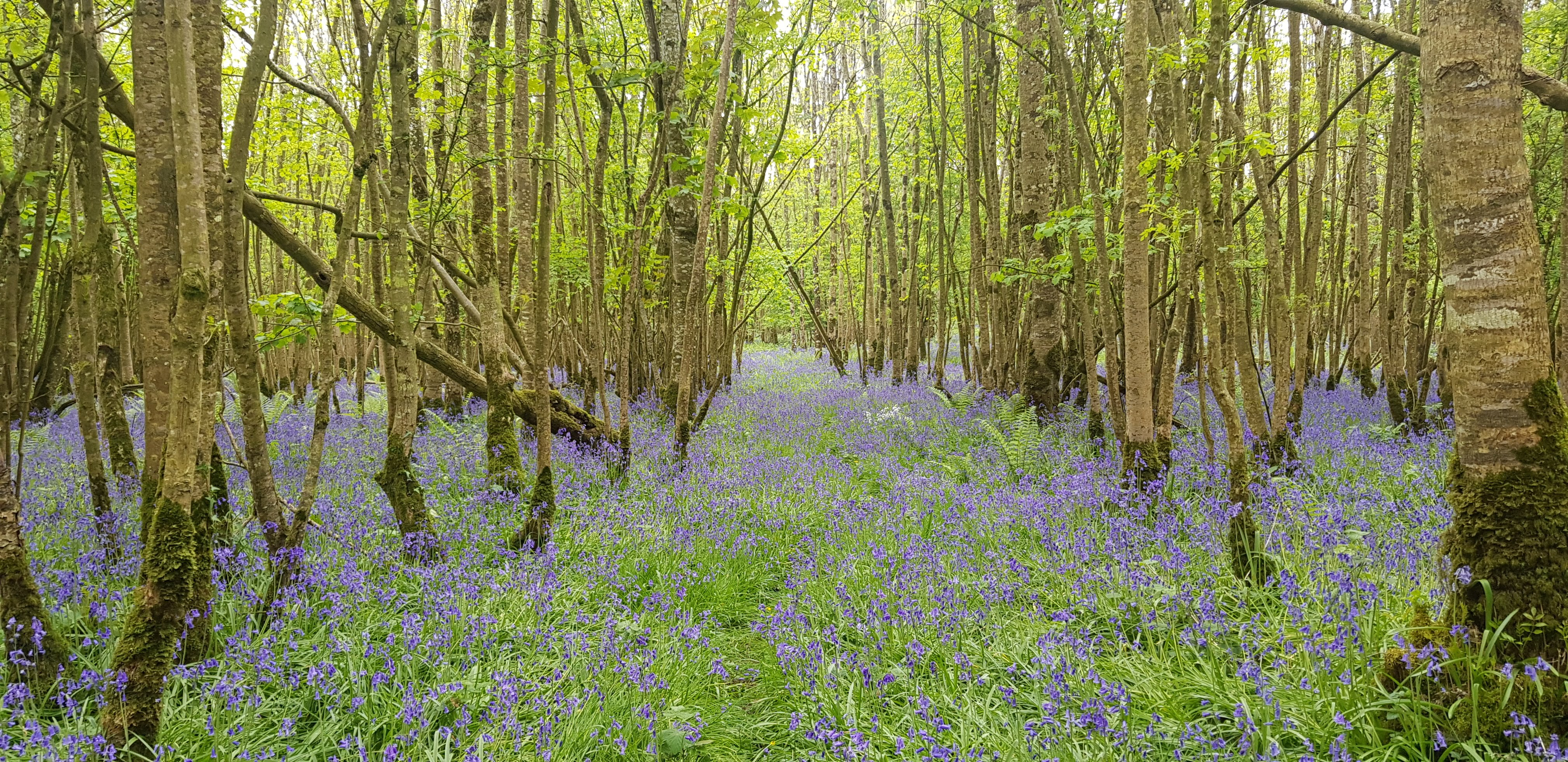
Bluebells and trees in Charleville Forest

The floodplain of the River Shannon is in the north-western part of the county. The River Camcor, a Wild Trout Conservation Area, runs through the town of Birr where it joins the Little Brosna River. The River Brosna runs across the county from Lough Owel in Westmeath to Shannon Harbour. Silver River runs through several towns in the south of the county before joining Brosna near the town of Ferbane. The Grand Canal also runs across the county from Edenderry on the north-east to Shannon Harbour before joining the Shannon. The county contains many small lakes from Lough Boora to Pallas Lake and it also contains 42 hectares (100 acres) of swamp land. There are a number of eskers in the county's landscape including Esker Riada.

Offaly largely comprises a flat landscape and is known for its extensive bog and peatlands. There are many large bogs in Offaly including the Bog of Allen, Clara Bog, Boora Bog, and Raheenmore Bog which are spread out across the county with the Bog of Allen extending into four other counties. The county consists of approximately 420 square kilometres (160 sq mi) of peatland, which is 21% of Offaly's total land area.

Offaly contains approximately 90 km^{2} (35 sq mi) of forest and woodland area, which only amounts to 4.5% of the county's land area. This includes woodlands within the Slieve Blooms and the Lough Boora Parklands. Roughly 75% of Offaly's forested area is conifer high forest.

=== Baronies ===
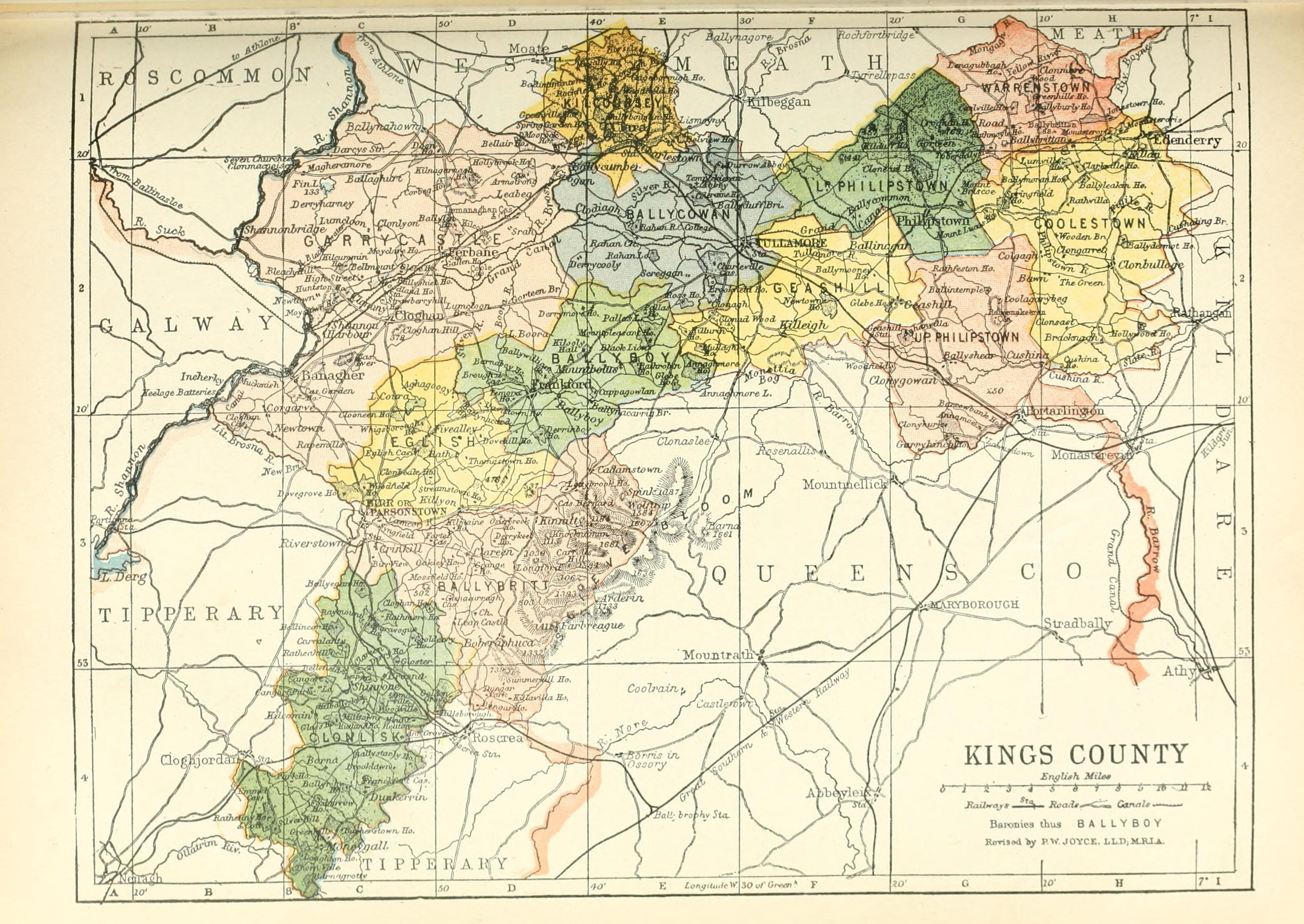
Baronies of Offaly

The following are the historical baronies of County Offaly:

- Ballyboy
- Ballybritt
- Ballycowan
- Clonlisk
- Coolestown
- Eglish
- Garrycastle
- Geashill
- Kilcoursey
- Lower Philipstown
- Upper Philipstown
- Warrenstown

=== Towns and villages ===
- Ballinagar
- Ballyboy
- Ballycumber
- Banagher
- Belmont
- Birr
- Bracknagh
- Cadamstown
- Clara
- Clareen
- Cloghan
- Clonygowan
- Clonbullogue
- Clonmacnoise
- Coolderry
- Crinkill
- Croghan
- Daingean
- Dunkerrin
- Edenderry
- Ferbane
- Geashill
- Horseleap
- Kilcormac
- Killeigh
- Killoughey
- Kinnitty
- Lusmagh
- Moneygall
- Mountbolus
- Mucklagh
- Pullough
- Portarlington
- Rahan
- Rath
- Rhode
- Shannonbridge
- Shannon Harbour
- Shinrone
- Tullamore
- Tubber
- Walsh Island

== Local government and politics ==
The island of Ireland, showing location of County Offaly.

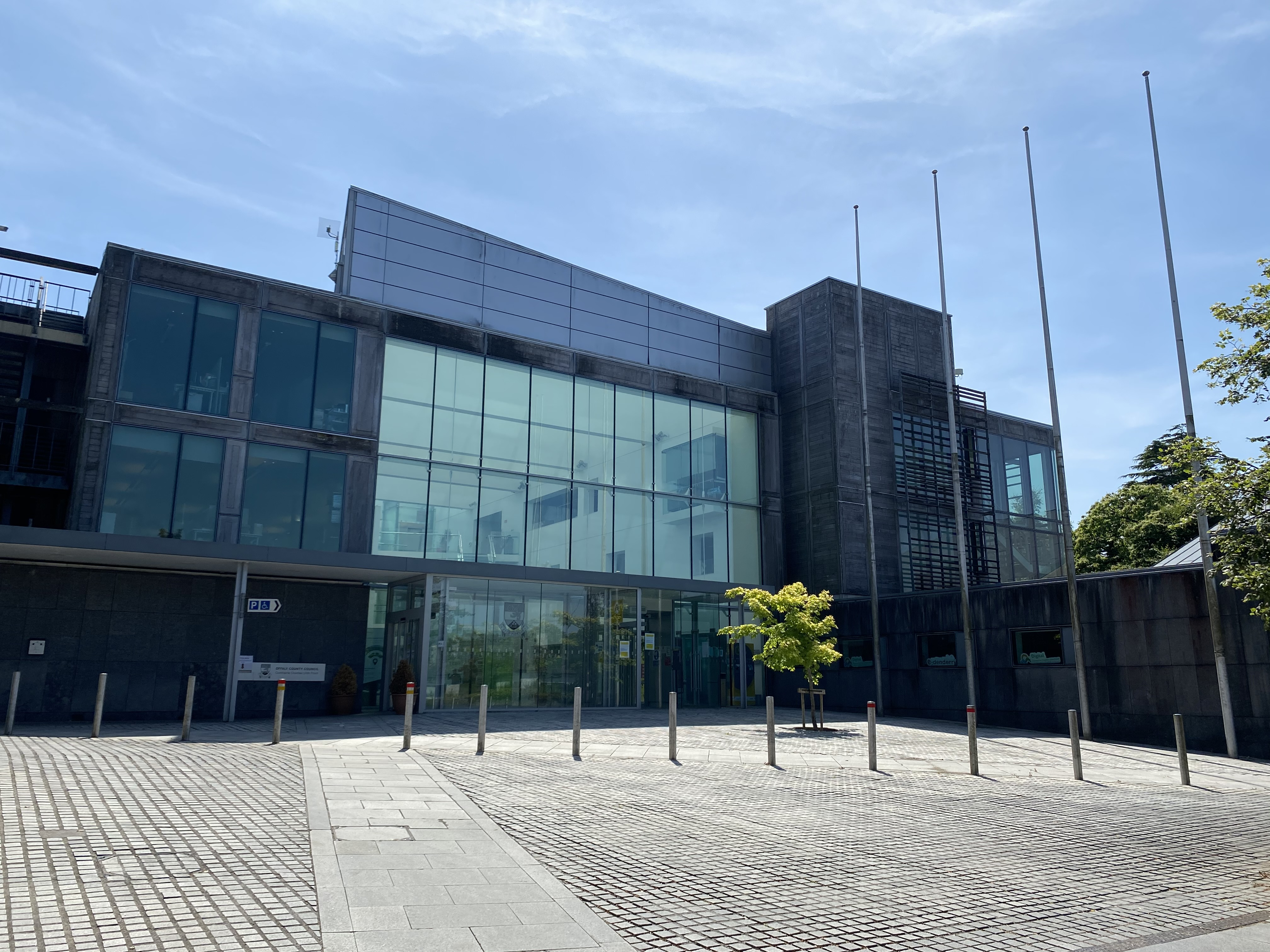
Áras an Chontae, Tullamore

Offaly County Council is the local authority for the county. The council is responsible for local services such as housing policy, social and cultural services, economic development and planning, motor taxation and infrastructural policy in the county.

Under the Local Government Reform Act 2014 the number of councillors was reduced to 19 from 21. The reforms also reduced the number of electoral areas to three: Tullamore (7 members), Birr (6 members) and Edenderry (6 members).

Until the 2011 general election Offaly was part of the Laois–Offaly constituency which elected five TDs to the Dáil. Between 1921 and 2011 this consisted of the full territory of both counties. For the 2011 general election, some electoral divisions in South Offaly were part of Tipperary North.

The Electoral (Amendment) (Dáil Constituencies) Act 2013 established a new constituency called Offaly for the 2016 general election. The constituency incorporates all of Offaly from the previous Laois–Offaly constituency, and 24 electoral divisions from Tipperary North. This constituency elected three TDs to the Dáil. It was abolished in 2020.

Laois–Offaly became a five-seat constituency again for the 2020 general election.

The Constituency Review Report 2023 proposed the establishment of a three-seat Offaly constituency comprising solely the county of Offaly. This change came into effect for the 34th Dáil.

== History ==
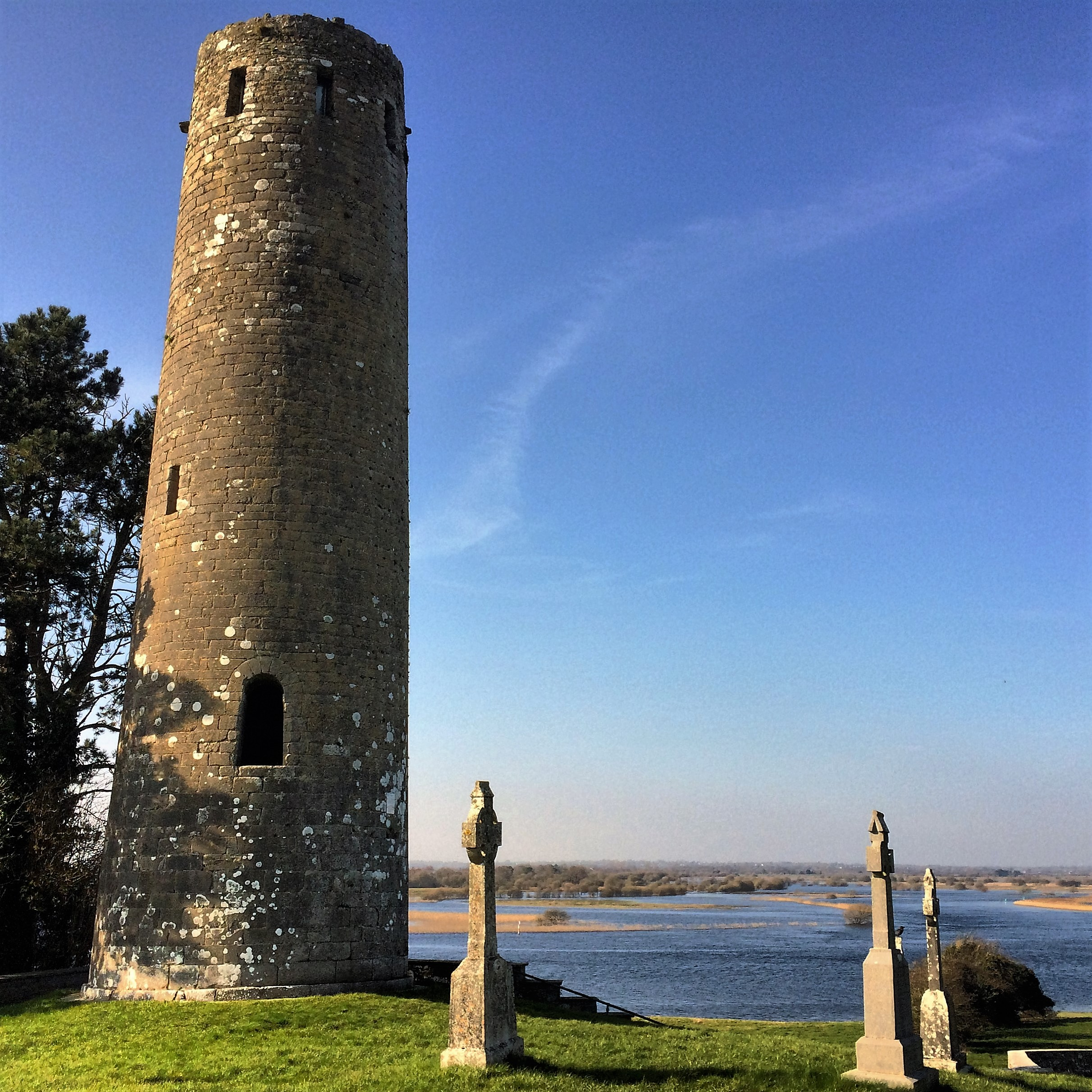
Clonmacnoise Monastery

One of the earliest known settlements in County Offaly is at Boora Bog which dates back to the Mesolithic era. Excavations here provide evidence of a temporary settlement as no structures were found at the site. Stone axes, arrowheads and blades were discovered which date to between 6,800 and 6,000 BCE.

The Dowris Hoard dating from the Late Bronze Age was found in a bog at Dowris, Whigsborough near Birr. It is the largest collection of Bronze Age objects ever found in Ireland.

After Christianisation, the monastic complex of Clonmacnoise was erected at the River Shannon near Shannonbridge. It is today a significant tourist destination.

The county itself was formed following the Tudor plantations of Laois and Offaly in an attempt by the Roman Catholic English Crown under Queen Mary I to expand its sphere of influence in Ireland which had declined following the Norman Conquest of Ireland. Both Laois (Leix) and Offaly (Uí Failghe) were petty kingdoms in Gaelic Ireland located just outside the Pale (a region around Dublin and the mid-east of Ireland that remained loyal to the English Crown following the Norman Conquest). The older kingdoms of Leix and Uí Failghe are not coterminous with the present-day counties that were formed.

The Kingdom of Uí Failghe, from which the name Offaly is derived, was ruled by the Ó Conchobhair Failghe (anglicised as O'Conor Faly) whose territory extended from the east of the county into north Kildare. The Kingdom of Firceall ruled by the O'Molloy clan constituted much of the centre of the county. The Kingdom of Firceall was part of the Kingdom of Meath while Uí Failghe was part of the Kingdom of Leinster. Much of the south of the present-day county (as well as northern County Tipperary) was ruled by Ó Cearbhaill of Éile (anglicised as O'Carroll Ely). Ely formed part of the Kingdom of Munster. These petty kingdoms were swept aside by the Tudor plantations. The Settlement of Laois and Offaly 1556, an Act of the Parliament of Ireland, created "King's County", named after Philip, king of Ireland, jure uxoris. This replaced the old kingdoms with baronies and the present-day County System.

Detail from the Parnell Monument in Dublin, unveiled in 1911, on which the names of all the counties of Ireland were included on bronze plaques (note: Queens, Wicklow and Kings)

Although the county is named Offaly in the Local Government Act 2001, no legislation was ever enacted after independence explicitly changing the name from King's County, the name formally established under the Local Government (Ireland) Act 1898, which continued to have legal effect. Legal transfers and assignments of land in the county still refer to it as "King's County".

== Places of interest ==
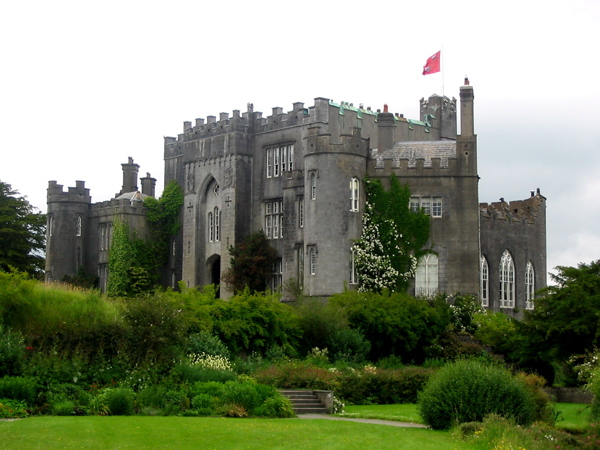
Birr Castle

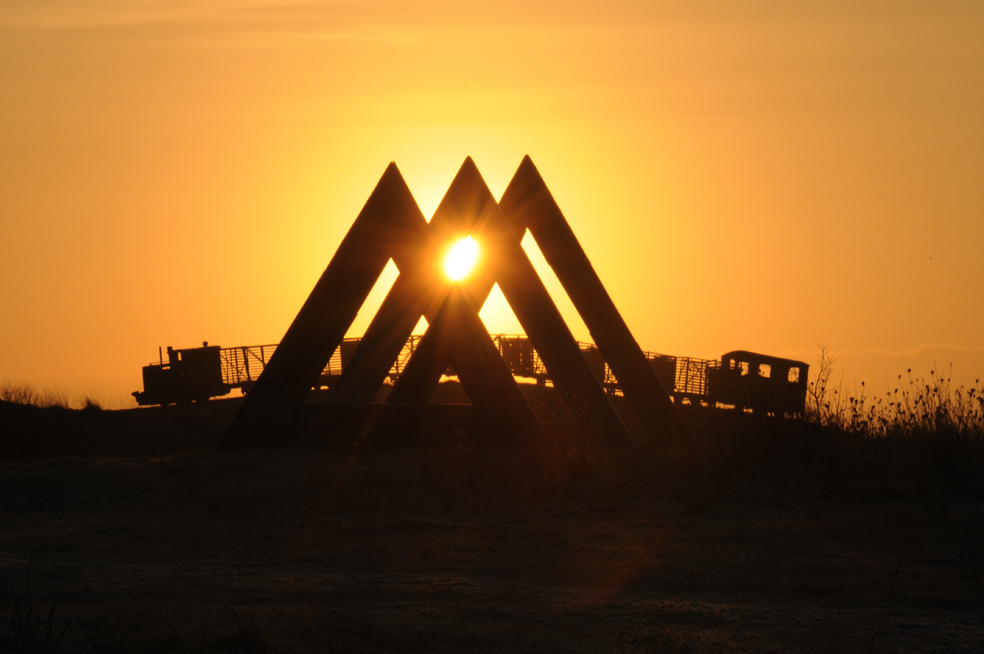
Sculpture Park at Lough Boora

- Birr in the south of the county is best known for its castle and gardens. Birr Castle is owned by the Parsons family, (the family bears the title: 'Earl of Rosse') and is best known for its 19th-century telescope, the Leviathan of Parsonstown.
- Sculpture in the Parklands around Lough Boora in Boora Bog.
- Charleville Castle located in Tullamore
- Ancient Christian monastic site at Clonmacnoise along with ancient examples of the Irish High cross such as the 'Cross of the Scriptures' and the round tower and visitors centre.
- Kinnitty Castle
- Slieve Bloom Mountains with panoramic views of Counties Offaly and Laois
- Banagher and the river Shannon for cruises along the river.
- The Boora bog reserve is a haven for wildlife and most notably contains the last Irish population of the grey partridge.
- Durrow Abbey and High Cross
- Tullamore Dew Visitor Centre
- Clara Bog Nature Reserve
- Leap Castle
- The Old Churches of Rahan and Lynally
- Croghan Hill, a 230-metre (750 ft) high hill where an ancient mummy was discovered. It is known as the Croghan Bog Man. It is now found in the National History Museum.
- Moneygall is the ancestral home of the former president of the United States, Barack Obama. Located in the village, is a visitor centre and service station known as the Obama Plaza.

== Demographics ==
Historical population
Year	Pop.	±%
1600	3,435	—
1610	6,756	+96.7%
1653	7,654	+13.3%
1659	8,310	+8.6%
1821	131,088	+1477.5%
1831	144,225	+10.0%
1841	146,857	+1.8%
1851	112,076	−23.7%
1861	90,043	−19.7%
1871	75,900	−15.7%
1881	72,852	−4.0%
1891	65,563	−10.0%
1901	60,187	−8.2%
1911	56,832	−5.6%
1926	52,592	−7.5%
1936	51,308	−2.4%
1946	53,686	+4.6%
1951	52,544	−2.1%
1956	51,970	−1.1%
1961	51,533	−0.8%
1966	51,717	+0.4%
1971	51,829	+0.2%
1979	57,342	+10.6%
1981	58,312	+1.7%
1986	59,835	+2.6%
1991	58,494	−2.2%
1996	59,117	+1.1%
2002	63,663	+7.7%
2006	70,868	+11.3%
2011	76,687	+8.2%
2016	77,961	+1.7%
2022	82,668	+6.0%

The 2006 population figure for County Offaly was the highest for the county since 1881. The Central Statistics Office estimates that the increase in population between 2002 and 2006 (7,205) comprised a natural increase of 2,026 people with the balance of 5,179 accounted for by net in-migration from within Ireland as well as abroad. The population increased by 11.3% between 2002 and 2006 which was a greater rate than the national average rate of 8.2%. This may be attributed to the county's proximity to the Greater Dublin Area, increased accessibility to Dublin (M6, M7, and improved rail services) and lower house prices than in Dublin.

The population of many towns rose during the period 1996 to 2006: Birr +21.5%, Tullamore +28.8% and Edenderry +53.9%. The population of Portarlington increased by 50.1% between 2002 and 2006.

The population as of census 2016 was 77,961 people with 34.7% (27,085 people) under the age of 25 and 13.6% (10,951 people) over the age of 65.

== Economy ==
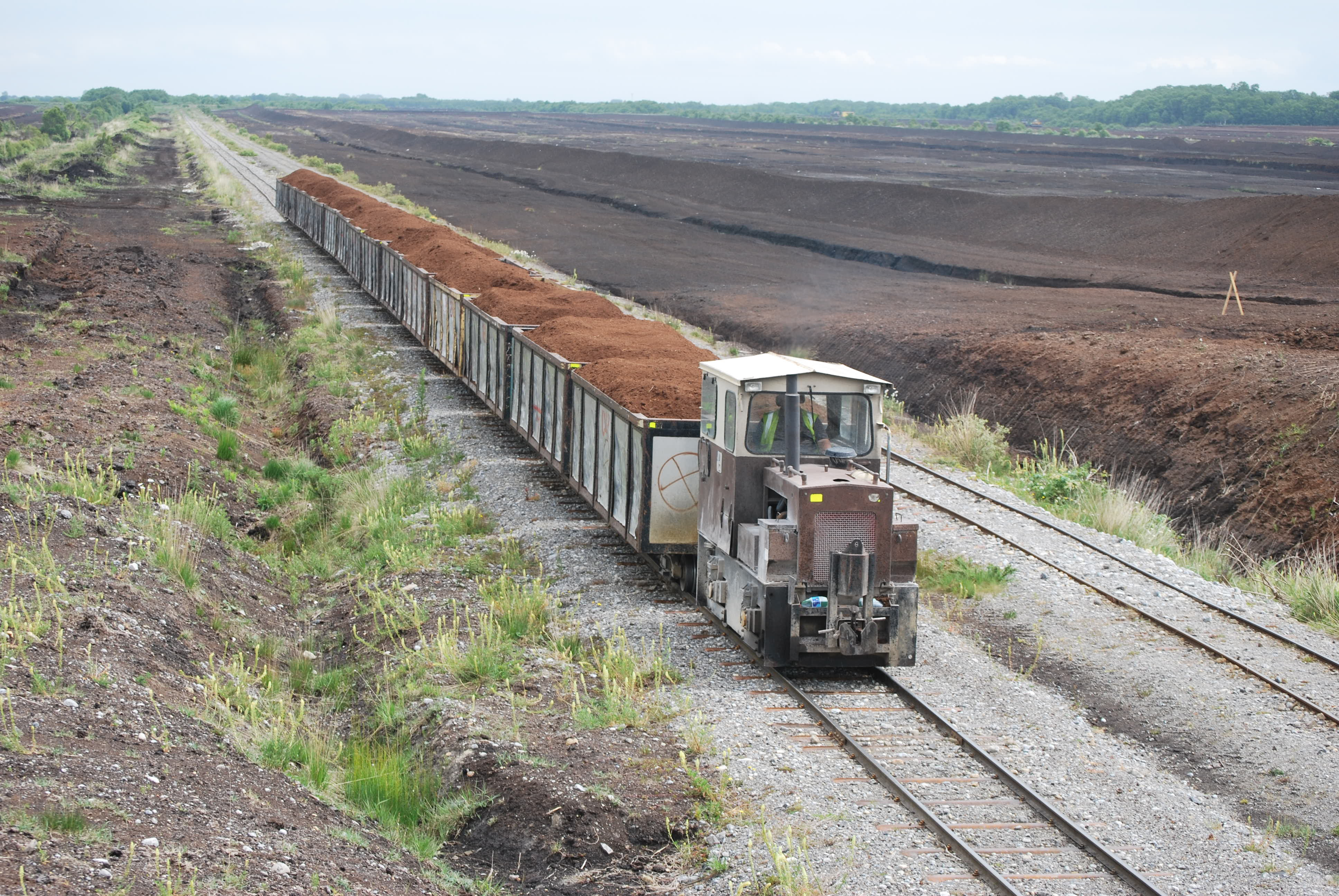
Commercial peat extraction was traditionally the largest industry in the county.

Traditionally, agriculture and industry have been the main driving force of the economy in the county. Offaly has extensive bogland, particularly in the northern parts of the county, that forms part of the Bog of Allen. Bord na Móna was founded in 1946 and provided employment to hundreds of people in Offaly by making peat briquettes (for home domestic use) and supplying peat to power stations operated by ESB. Peat briquettes were made at the Bord na Móna Derrinlough briquette factory near Birr. Power stations are operating at Shannonbridge and Edenderry. With the continuing depletion of the bogs, a number of power stations have closed down during the early 2000s. The ESB power station at Lumcloon, Ferbane was a major employer in the midlands but closed in 2001. Plans were announced to close the Rhode power station in 2003. These were major landmarks in Offaly with large cooling towers that were visible for miles around Offaly and beyond, but were demolished soon after the stations closed. Many bogs are now used as wildlife reserves or for tourism activities such as Lough Boora.

The opening of the Grand Canal in the 18th century brought prosperity to towns such as Banagher and Tullamore. Both towns were important stops on the Dublin to Limerick navigation which supported a number of industries and brought cheap and efficient water transport to the county in that era.

The Celtic Tiger also brought an increase in economic activity to Offaly with business enterprise and industrial parks opening in Birr, Edenderry and Tullamore. Many people particularly in the east of the county are within an easy commuting distance to Dublin where many find employment.

== Infrastructure ==
=== Transport ===
==== Rail ====
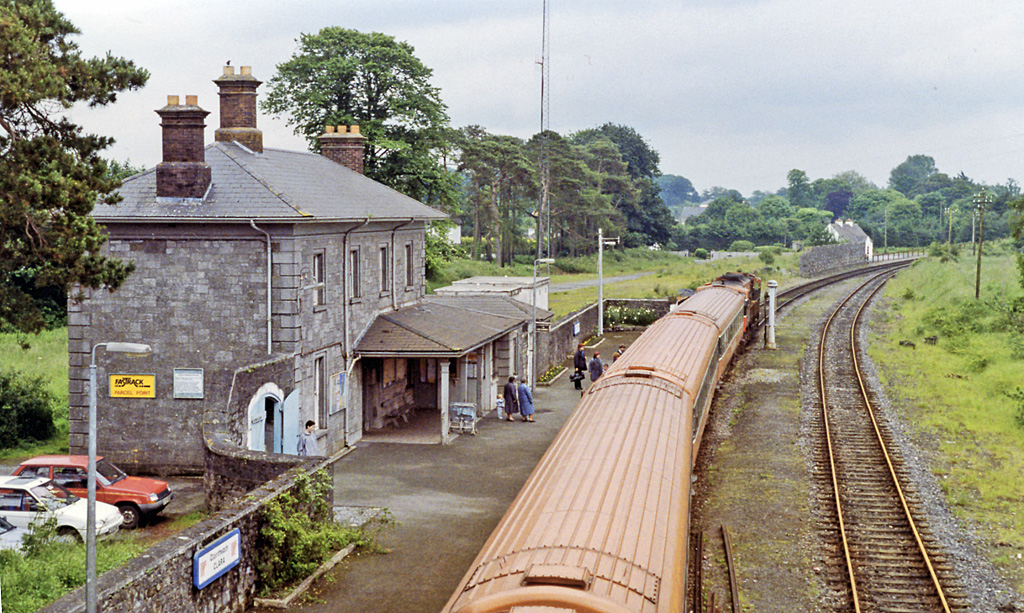
Clara railway station

North Offaly is well served by rail transport. Railway stations are located at Tullamore and Clara. With 539,240 passengers using the two Offaly-based stations in 2024, the county comprises over 1% of Ireland's total rail passenger numbers, which were 50.7m that year.

Both stations are on the main Dublin–Westport/Galway railway line with regular trains serving the area, especially for Dublin commuters. Portarlington railway station is located just over the County Laois border and is in a catchment area for the southeast of the county. Portarlington railway station is on the main Dublin–Cork railway line with regular commuter services to Heuston Station, Dublin and intercity services to Cork, Limerick, Killarney and Tralee. The southern and western baronies of Garrycastle, Ballyboy, Eglish, Ballybritt, and Clonlisk have no train stations. The majority of the baronies of Eglish and Ballybritt have a more than 25-minute drive to the nearest train station, be it Clara, Tullamore, or Ballybrophy in neighbouring Laois.

The Limerick-Ballybrophy railway line travels through the south of the county, which has no railway stations. The nearest are at Cloughjordan and Roscrea, both just outside the county boundary. A railway line from Birr connected to the line at Roscrea until it was closed in the 1960s. A controversial railway line also connected Birr to Portumna between 1868 and 1878 and became something of a folk legend.

==== Road ====
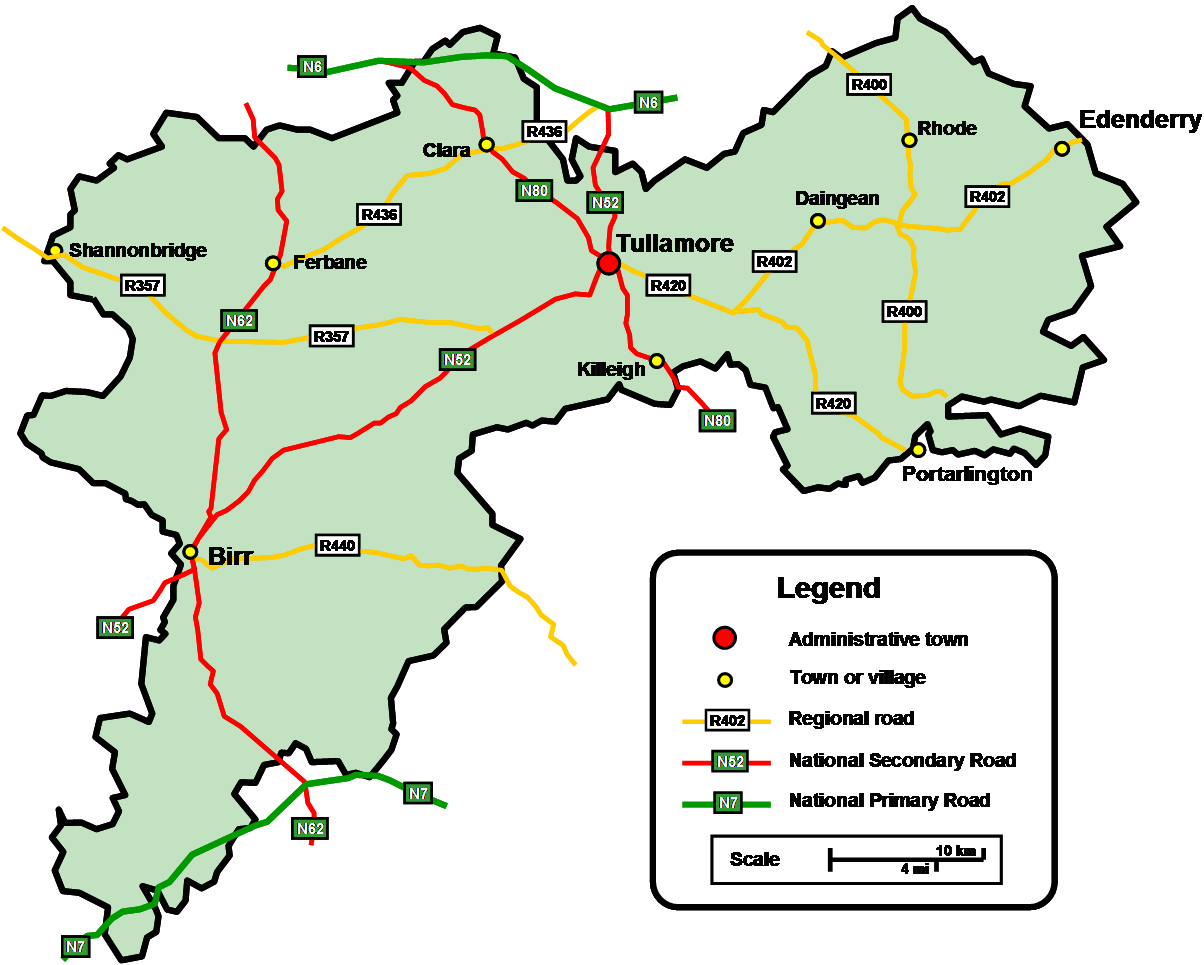
Road network of Offaly

Three main national secondary routes pass through the county. The N52 road passes from Kilbeggan to Tullamore and Birr which then continues to Nenagh where it intersects with the M7. The N62 from Athlone passes through Ferbane and Birr and continues onto Roscrea and Thurles. The N80 route starts in Tullamore and continues to the southeast passing through Portlaoise and Carlow. There are no main national primary routes in the county; the M6 skirts it to the north and the M7 to the south through Moneygall. Road infrastructure has improved with the completion of the Tullamore bypass in 2009 and improved access to regional cities following the completion of the intercity motorway network.

==== Bus ====
Bus Éireann provide public transport services throughout the county with regular bus services to Limerick and Waterford from Athlone bus station. Other private bus coach services provide direct bus services from Birr to Dublin such as Kearns bus service which run several services daily. Slieve Bloom Coaches run services from Tullamore and Portarlington to Dublin.

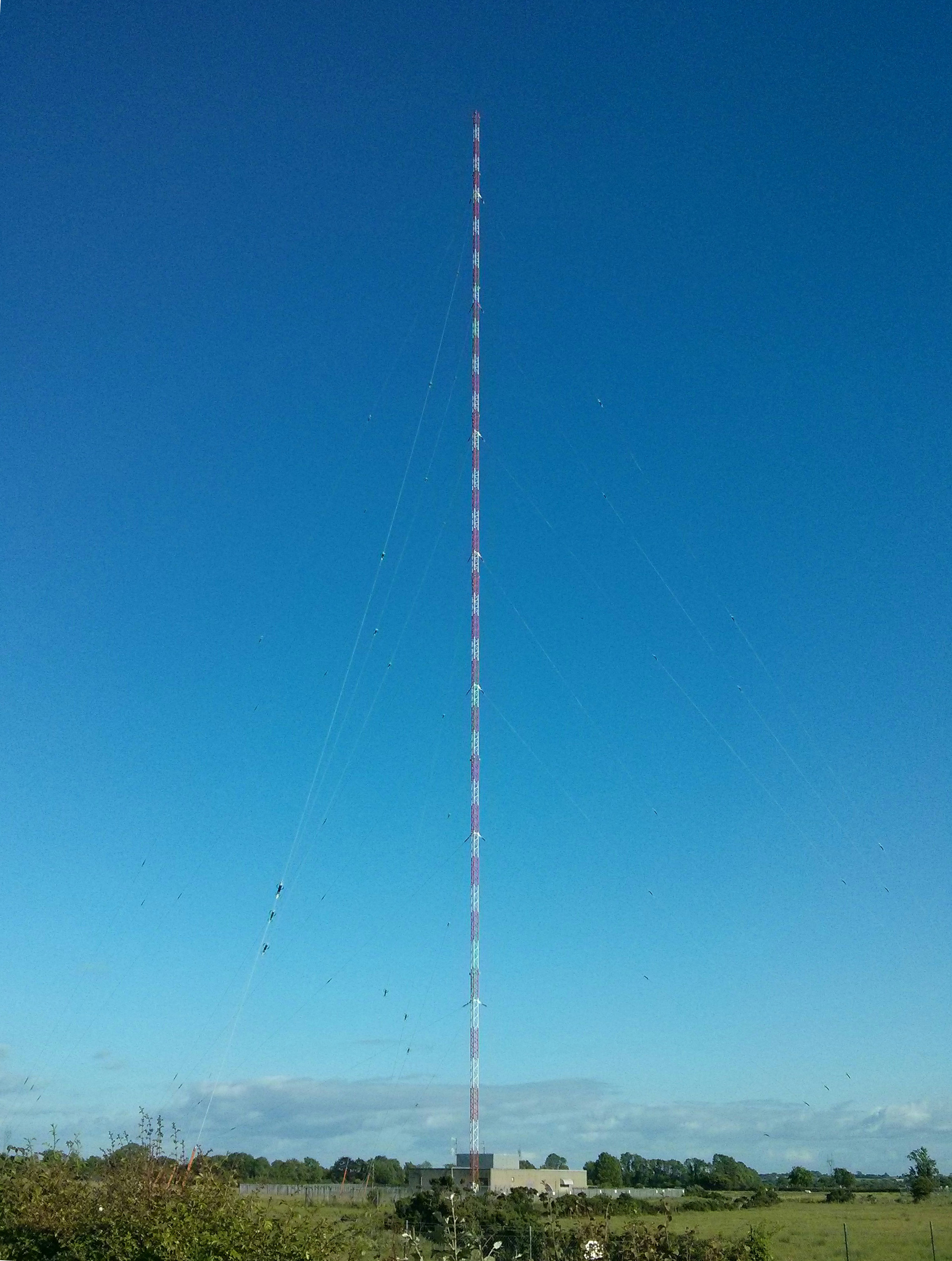
Radio transmitter in Ballycommon

==== Waterway ====
The Grand Canal connecting Dublin to the river Shannon was constructed through the towns of Edenderry and Tullamore and joins the Shannon at Shannon Harbour. Traditionally this was an important route for transport, communication and trade between Dublin, Limerick and the midlands of Ireland. The route fell into decline as road transport became more popular. Much of the route is now used for boating and leisure activities.

=== Media ===
==== Radio ====
Midlands 103 (originally Midlands Radio 3) which broadcasts to Laois, Offaly, and Westmeath is based in Tullamore and has studios across the Midlands. RTÉ's medium-wave transmitter broadcasting RTÉ Radio 1 was also located in Tullamore but transmission stopped in 2008.

==== Print ====
A number of local newspapers are published in Offaly. The Offaly Independent and Tullamore Tribune are based in Tullamore. The Midland Tribune, based in Birr, covers local news in the west and south of the county as well as parts of northern Tipperary including the towns of Birr, Roscrea and Nenagh and surrounding areas. The Offaly Express was a former newspaper based in Tullamore, which closed down in July 2012. It is now an online news platform for the county.

== Sport ==
=== GAA ===
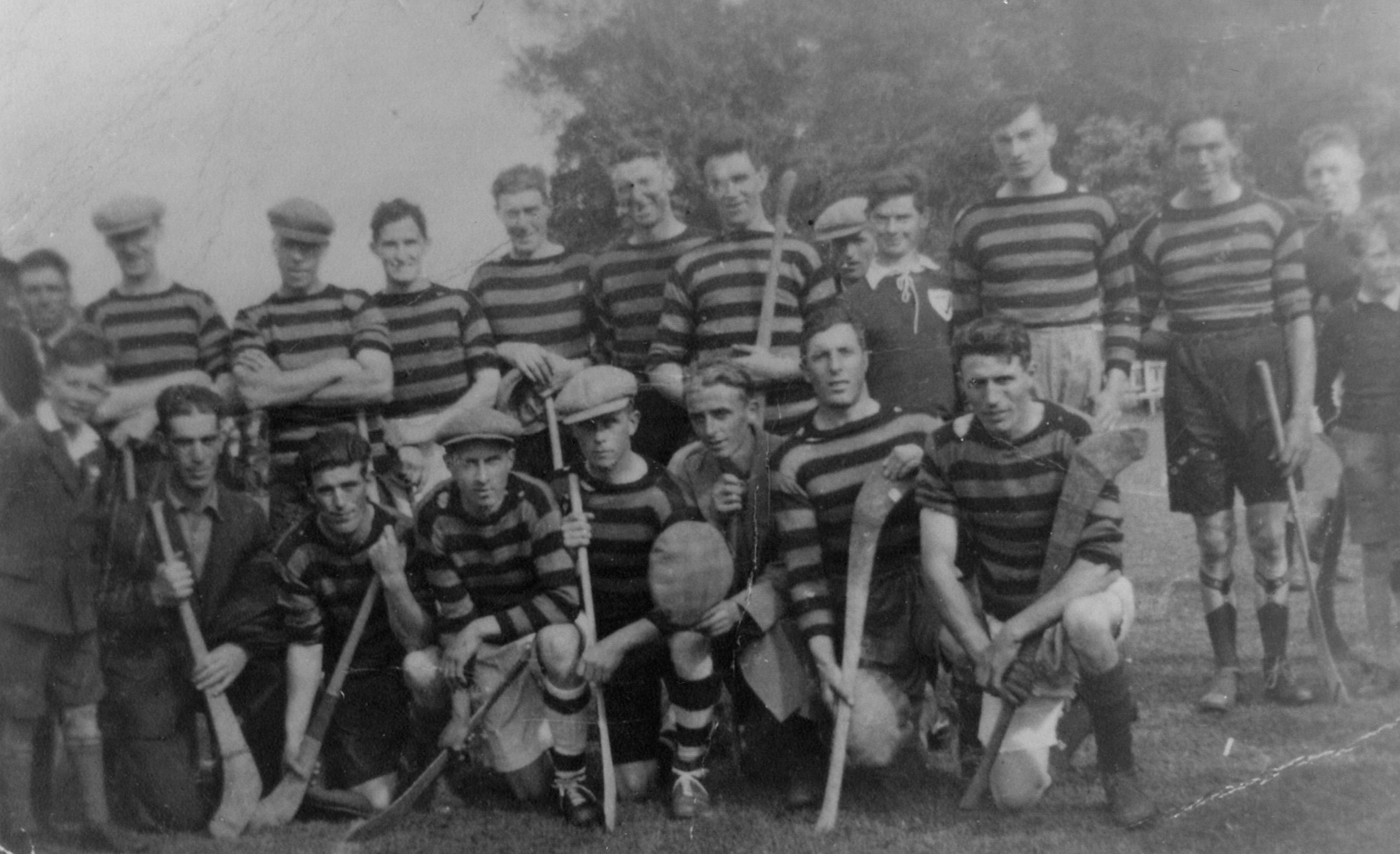
Hurlers from the Seir Kieran club, 1938

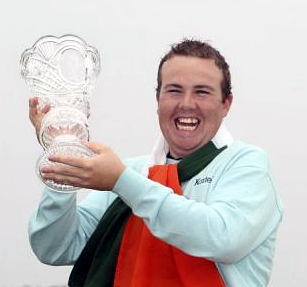
2019 Open Championship winner Shane Lowry

Gaelic games are popular. Offaly GAA has 44 clubs in various communities, contesting the traditional sports of football and hurling. The town of Birr is a hurling stronghold, with its local club having won four All-Ireland Club SHC titles. Coolderry (2011) and Kilcormac–Killoughey (2012) are other clubs in the west of the county to have had success in the Leinster Club SHC.

County teams have also achieved national recognition in both hurling and football, winning the Liam MacCarthy Cup four times and the Sam Maguire Cup three times. The football team is remembered for Séamus Darby's goal in the dying minutes of the 1982 All-Ireland SFC final, when Offaly took the title by one point and denied opponent Kerry what would have been a historic (having never before occurred, and not occurring until 2019) five consecutive titles.

=== Association football ===
Tullamore Town F.C. play at Leah Victoria Park. The club have previously competed in the A Championship and the League of Ireland B Division.

=== Other sports ===
Other popular sports in the county include rugby and golf. Birr Golf Club and Esker Hills Golf Club near Tullamore are popular. Irish golfer Shane Lowry is a member of Esker Hills. He is from the town of Clara outside Tullamore. As an amateur, he won the 2009 Irish Open. In 2019, Lowry won The Open Championship in Royal Portrush Golf Club.

== Culture ==
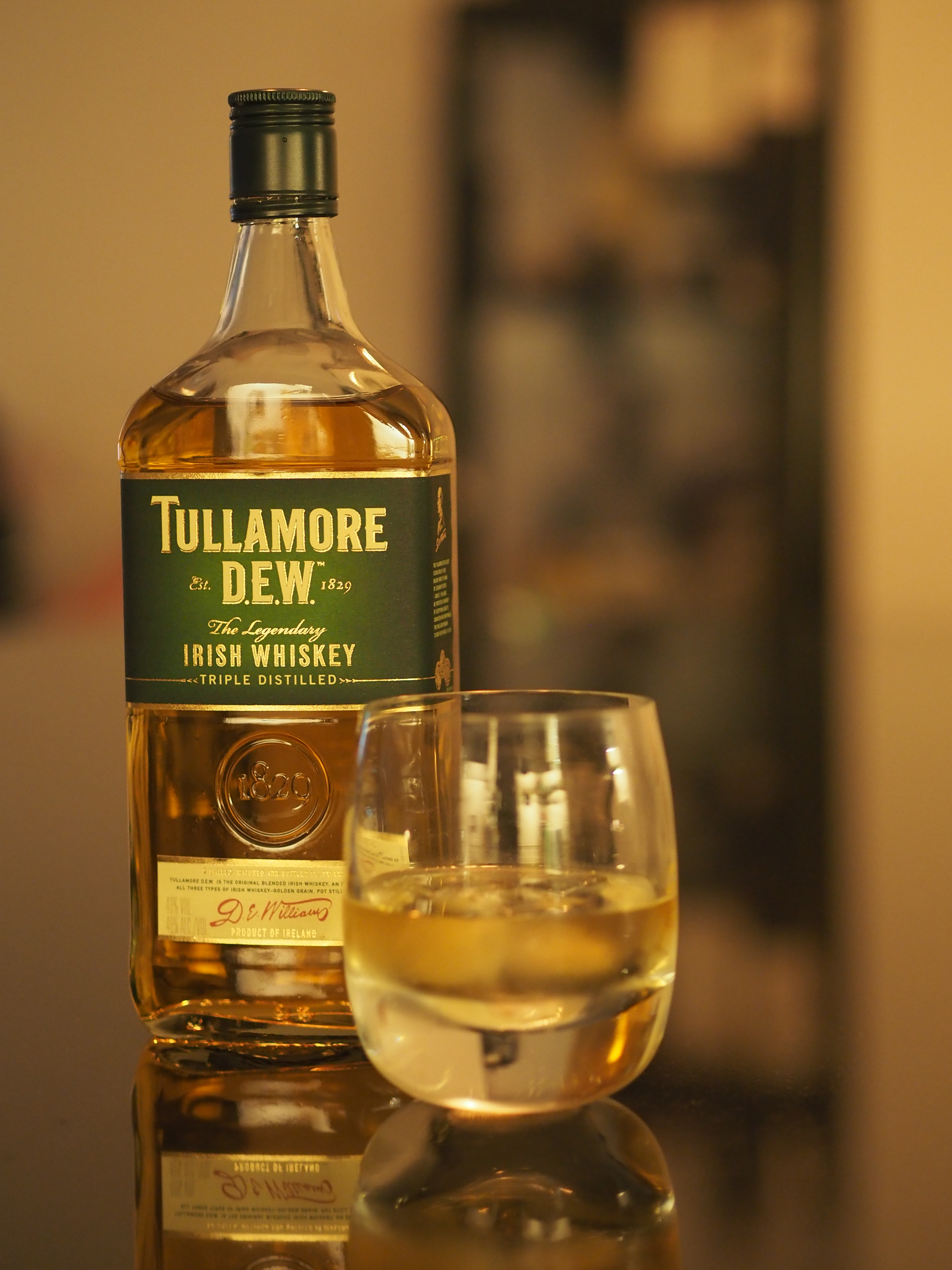
Tullamore Dew, the second-best-selling global brand of Irish whiskey

=== People ===
- George Brent, Hollywood actor
- Jon R. Cavaiani, Congressional Medal of Honor Recipient
- Ged Corcoran, Irish rugby league footballer
- Brian Cowen, former Taoiseach
- Patrick Cronin, priest, Archbishop of Cagayan de Oro (1970–1988)
- Neil Delamere, comedian
- Alex Dunne, racing driver
- Barry Glendenning, journalist
- Rex Ingram, Hollywood silent film director, born in Dublin but lived in Kinnitty
- John Joly, scientist, born at Bracknagh in 1857
- Shane Lowry, golfer
- Seán William McLoughlin (Jacksepticeye), popular YouTuber known primarily for his Let's Plays
- Mundy, musician
- William Parsons, 3rd Earl of Rosse, astronomer; also the father of Charles Algernon Parsons who invented the steam turbine.
- Bindon Blood Stoney (1828–1909), engineer and inventor. Born Oakley Park, Clareen.
- George Johnstone Stoney (1826–1911), physicist. Born Oakley Park, Clareen. He introduced the term electron in 1891.
- Abraham Wallace, 19th-century Australian pastoralist

== See also ==
- Busherstown House
- High Sheriff of King's County
- List of abbeys and priories in Ireland (County Offaly)
- Lord Lieutenant of King's County
