= Killoughey =

Townland and civil parish in County Offaly, Ireland

Coordinates: 53°10′47″N 7°34′54″W

Killoughey, officially Killoughy and historically "Killaghy" or "Killahy" (Irish: Cill Achaidh, meaning 'church of the field'), is a townland, electoral division and civil parish south-west of Tullamore in County Offaly, Ireland.

Before 1784, there were two distinct parishes of Killoughey and Ballyboy. The two parishes were united in 1784 and today form one parish of Kilcormac and Killoughy of the Diocese of Meath. The two main villages at the Killoughy end of the parish are Blue Ball and Mountbolus.

As of the 2022 census, the electoral division of Killoughy had a population of 771 people.
