= Kilcormac =

Village in County Offaly, Ireland

Kilcormac Irish: Cill Chormaic
- Village
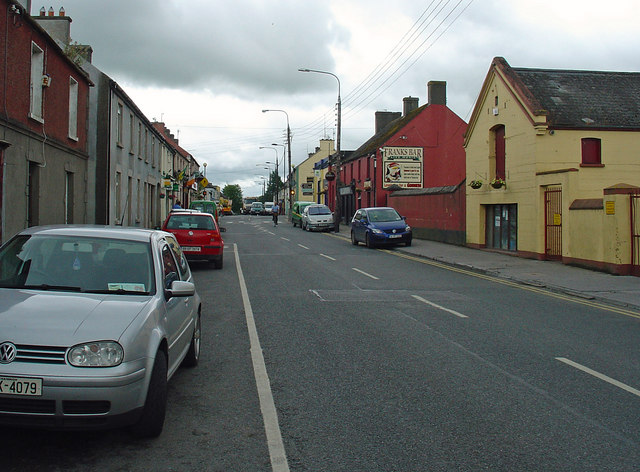
- Main Street, Kilcormac

- Location in Ireland
- Coordinates: 53°10′27″N 7°43′32″W
- Country: Ireland
- Province: Leinster
- County: Offaly
- Elevation: 75 m (246 ft)

Population (2016)
  - Total: 935
- Time zone: UTC+0 (WET)
  - Summer (DST): UTC-1 (IST (WEST))
- Irish Grid Reference: N181141

Kilcormac (Irish: Cill Chormaic, meaning 'church of Cormac') is a small town in County Offaly, Ireland, located on the N52 at its junction with the R437 regional road, between the towns of Tullamore and Birr. It is a small village of 935 people (as of the 2016 census), many of whom were previously employed by Bord na Móna to work the local peat bogs. The village is located near the Slieve Bloom Mountains. The Silver River flows through the village. The village was more commonly referred to as Frankford prior to Irish independence.

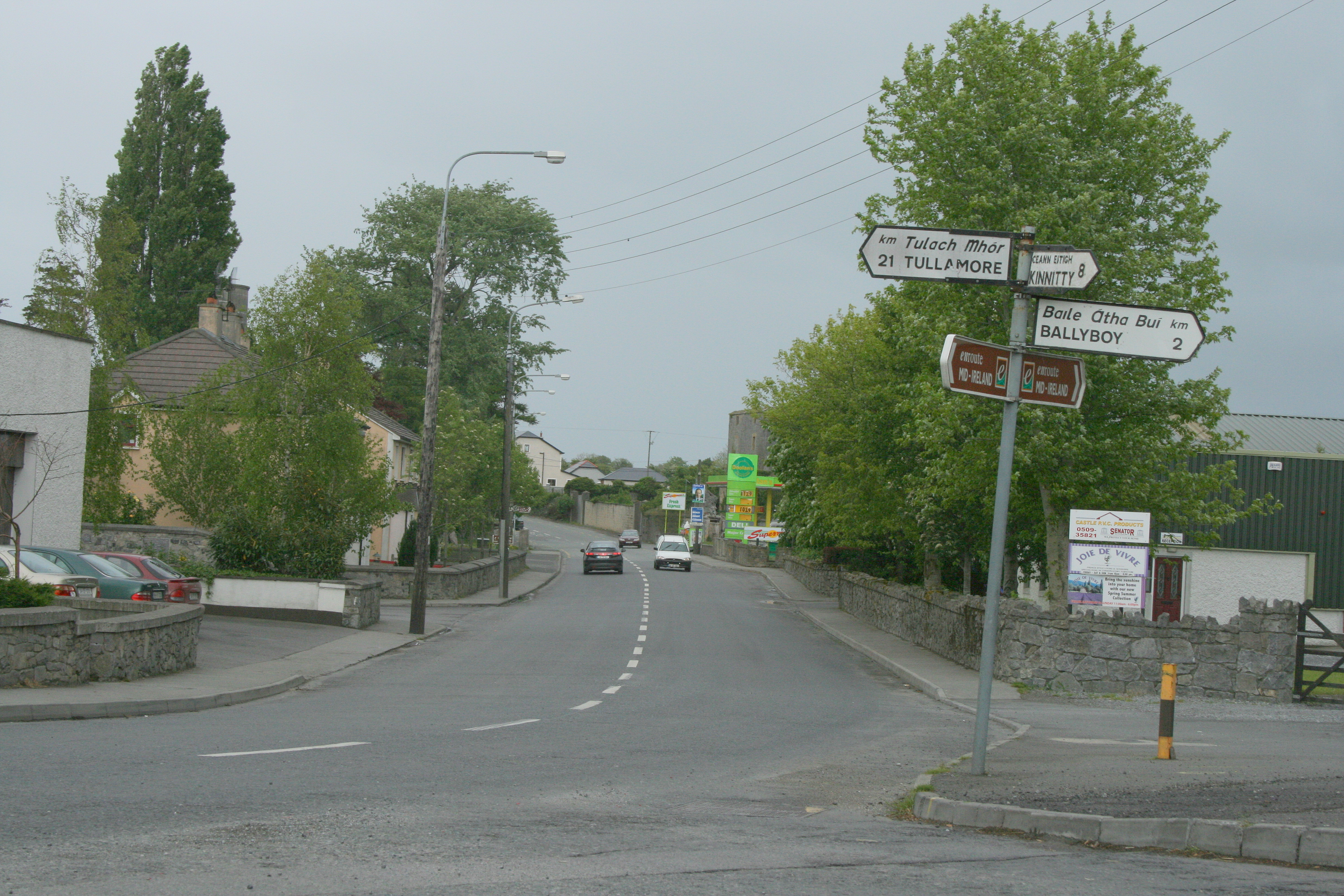
Kilcormac

== History ==
The name Kilcormac comes from the Irish Cill Chormaic meaning Cormac's Church. This name is based on the local patron saint; Cormac Ua Liatháin, a native of Cork, who paid a visit to St Colmcille at the famous monastery he had founded in Durrow in 553 A.D. Cormac was so inspired by the great saint that he joined Colmcille and spent many years at Durrow, eventually taking over as abbot after Colmcille had gone to Iona in Scotland. He eventually founded a church near the Silver River which became known as Cill Chormaic. Over time the original church fell into ruin. Tradition holds that Cormac died in nearby Eglish following an attack by a pair of wolves. A window in Eglish Church depicts the event.

Historically, Kilcormac was part of the O'Molloy territory of Firceall which was part of the Kingdom of Meath, however Ballyboy was traditionally the main trading centre of the area at the time being situated on an important route which passed through the area. Following the Plantations of Offaly the area formed part of the Barony of Ballyboy. About five hundred years later reference is made to foreign monks, possibly Augustinian, at the Hermitage. A manuscript, written in Kilcormac in 1300, is now in the museum of the Royal Irish Academy. (The same museum also houses the crozier of Durrow, which was probably Cormac's symbol of authority when he succeeded Colmcille as abbot of Durrow).

During the Middle Ages Kilcormac was the site of a Carmelite monastery. Following the Henrican Reformation all monasteries were dissolved. The current Convent of Mercy is located on the site of the old monastery. The current Catholic Church is located on the site of Cormac's old church. The Church is a fine imposing building and dates from 1867 after a number of alterations to the original church built during the time of the penal laws. It is dedicated to the Blessed Virgin Mary.

=== The Kilcormac Pieta ===
Within the church is statue of the Pieta. According to tradition it was donated to the parish by a rich lady in the 16th century. It was placed in the parish church, which at that time was in Ballyboy, about 1 mile from Kilcormac. There it remained until 1650 when Oliver Cromwell’s army was reported approaching from the direction of Cadamstown. The pieta was eventually buried in a bog for 60 years for safety. During this time both Ballyboy and Kilcormac Churches were ruined by Cromwell's forces. While the church at Kilcormac was not rebuilt, Ballyboy Church was rebuilt eventually, but as part of the Established Anglican Church of Ireland. Tradition holds that only one man remained alive who knew where the Pieta was buried, and, according to tradition, he was carried on his deathbed to point it out. The carving was carefully recovered and when it was examined it was found to be in perfect condition. It was then placed in the Church Of The Nativity that had recently been built in Kilcormac.

=== 18th Century onwards ===
Kilcormac grew in importance in the 18th and 19th Century as Ballyboy went into decline. Following the establishment of County Offaly and the growth of Tullamore, Kilcormac now found itself on the main route on from Birr to Tullamore and became an important market centre in the area. Following the relaxation of the Penal laws the Catholic Church also opted to build its church in Kilcormac and not Ballyboy which cemented its place as a market centre of the area given the Catholic majority population of the area.

== Services and amenities ==
The amenities serving the local population include a primary school, a secondary school (Coláiste Naomh Cormac), a number of local grocery shops, butchers, clothes shop, doctors practice, chemist and an agricultural/hardware store. There are also a number of pubs along the main street. Kilcormac has somewhat declined from its peak which was in the mid 20th Century. Many people traditionally found work in Bord na Móna and the bogs in what is now a declining industry. Bord na Móna remains an important part of the local economy with many employed in nearby Derrinlough at the peat briquette manufacturing plant. Agriculture and farming are also important to the local economy. The main route out of Kilcormac is the R437 regional road.

Lough Boora parklands is a local outdoor amenity for walkers and outdoor pursuits, as are the nearby Slieve Bloom Mountains.

== Sport ==
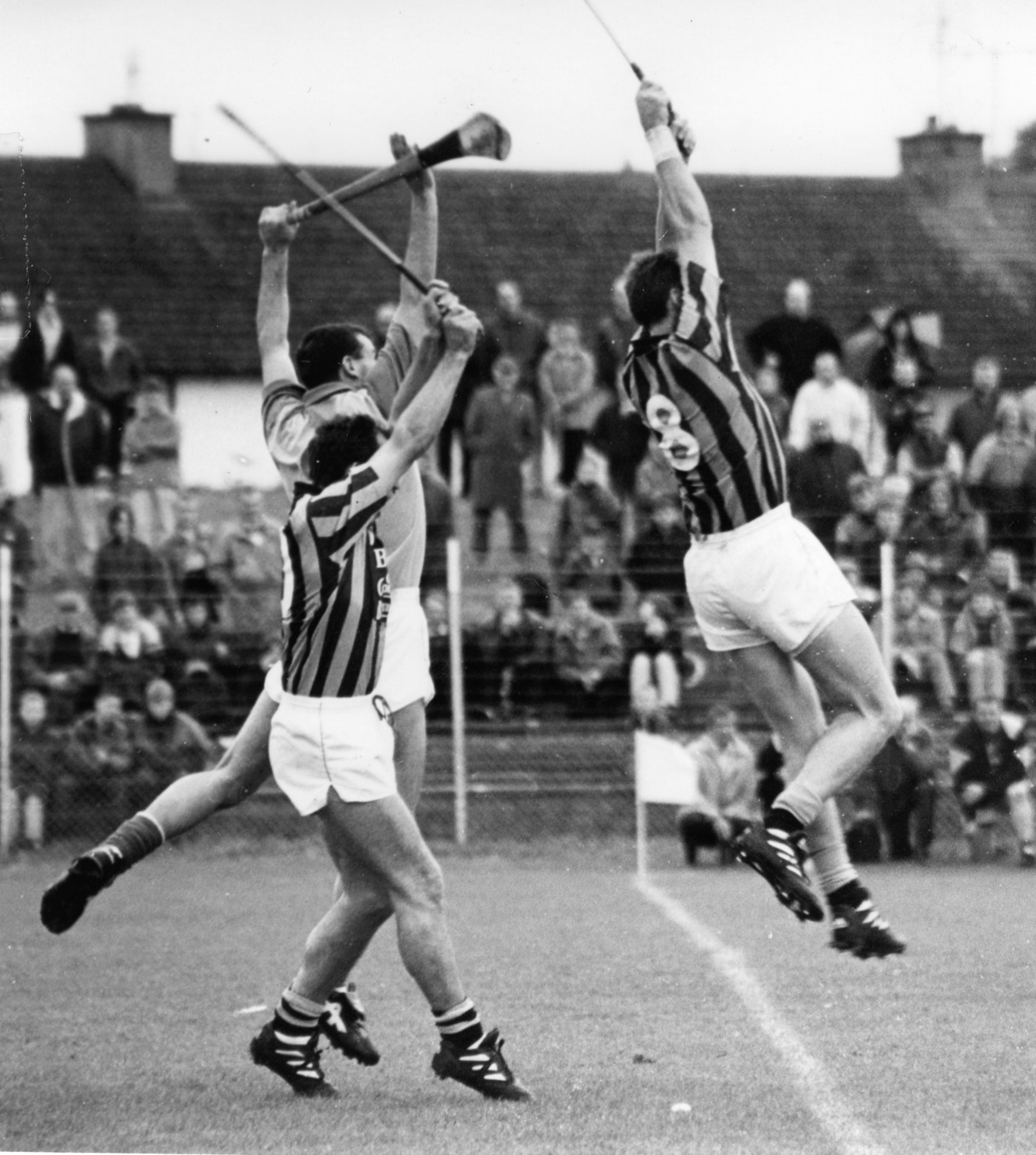
Kilcormac-Killoughey play Seir Kieran in the 1996 Offaly Senior Hurling Championship

Gaelic games are the most popular sports played in the area and are played at all levels. Hurling is the most popular code of sport played. Kilcormac–Killoughey GAA is the local GAA club. The club has had a number of successes since its foundation in 1986, including winning the Leinster Senior Club Hurling Championship in 2012.

== See also ==
- List of towns and villages in Ireland
