= Mountbolus =

Village in County Offaly, Ireland

Mountbolus Cnocán Bhólais
- Village
- Location in Ireland
- Coordinates: 53.195923°N 7.628728°W
- Country: Ireland
- Province: Leinster
- County: County Offaly
- Elevation: 91 m (299 ft)

Mountbolus (Irish: Cnocán Bhólais) is a small village in County Offaly, Ireland. It is in the parish of Killoughey situated at the foot of the Slieve Bloom Mountains, 13 km south-west of Tullamore.

It has a church, a national (primary) school, and one public house.

The area's GAA club is Kilcormac/Killoughey GAA. When Offaly won the 1998 All-Ireland Senior Hurling Championship, the goalkeeper on the team was Stephen Byrne from the club.
