= Busherstown House =

Coordinates: 52°53′36.83″N 7°56′8.51″W

General information
- Type: Country house
- Location: Ireland

Busherstown House is a country house in Busherstown, on the Offaly/Tipperary border, in Ireland. It was built by Humphrey Minchin in 1740 and rebuilt in c.1810 following a fire. It was then that the house was given its fine gothic revival frontage, including terminating towers and a parapet to the West front. The house was owned by the Minchin family up until it was sold for the first time in 1973.

The entry from Burke’s Irish Country Houses describes Busherstown as follows: "A partly-castellated 2-storey house built on the site of an old castle, originally called Bouchardstown, after the original owner, Bouchard de Marisco. Granted in the 17th Century to Charles Minchin; an early 18th Century house being built on the site of the old castle by Humphrey Minchin, MP, and improved by his son, another Humphrey. The house was partly burnt in 1764, having been set on fire by robbers; it was subsequently rebuilt, and given a slightly castellated facade, rather similar to the nearby Mount Heaton. Round tower at one end; 3 bay centre, with Georgian sash windows; bow-ended square tower with segmental pointed windows at other end of front. Battlemented and machicolated parapet. The side of the house is not castellated, but quite plain; of 3 bays, the centre bay breaking forward. Lower service wing with gable at other end of the house. Painted ceiling decoration in reception rooms. Early 19th Century round tower on the summit of a wooded hill behind the house. Sold 1973."
