= Eglish =

Village in County Tyrone, Northern Ireland

Coordinates: 54.451544°N 6.794431°W

Eglish: Irish: An Eaglais
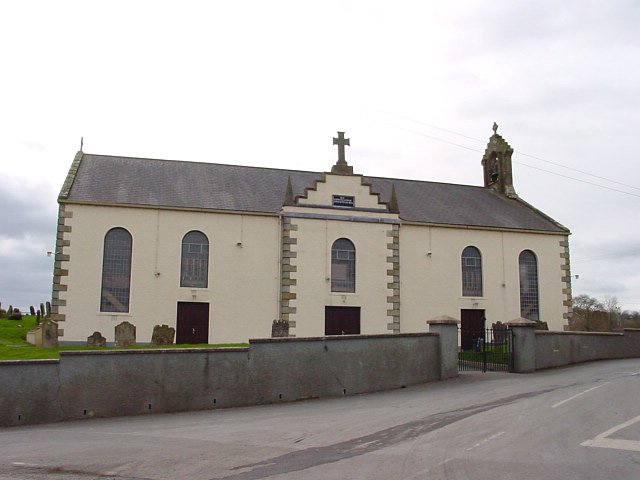
- Church of St Patrick in Eglish

- Location within Northern Ireland
- Population: 515 (2021 Census)
- Irish grid reference: H782565
  - Belfast: 36 mi (58 km)
- District: Mid Ulster District Council
- County: County Tyrone
- Country: Northern Ireland
- Sovereign state: United Kingdom
- Postcode district: BT70
- Dialling code: 028
- UK Parliament: Fermanagh & South Tyrone
- NI Assembly: Fermanagh & South Tyrone

Eglish (from Irish an Eaglais, meaning 'the church') is a small village in County Tyrone, Northern Ireland. It is about 6 km southwest of Dungannon, in the Mid Ulster District Council area. In the 2021 census it had a population of 515. The village has grown in a dispersed form and has a mix of housing, industry and services.

== Amenities and sport ==
Eglish St. Patrick's is the local Gaelic Athletic Association club. Eglish St Patrick's also has a camogie club.

Roan St Patrick's, which opened in 1912, is the local primary school.
