= Boora Bog =

Former peat bog in County Offaly, Ireland

Coordinates: 53.218°N 7.728°W

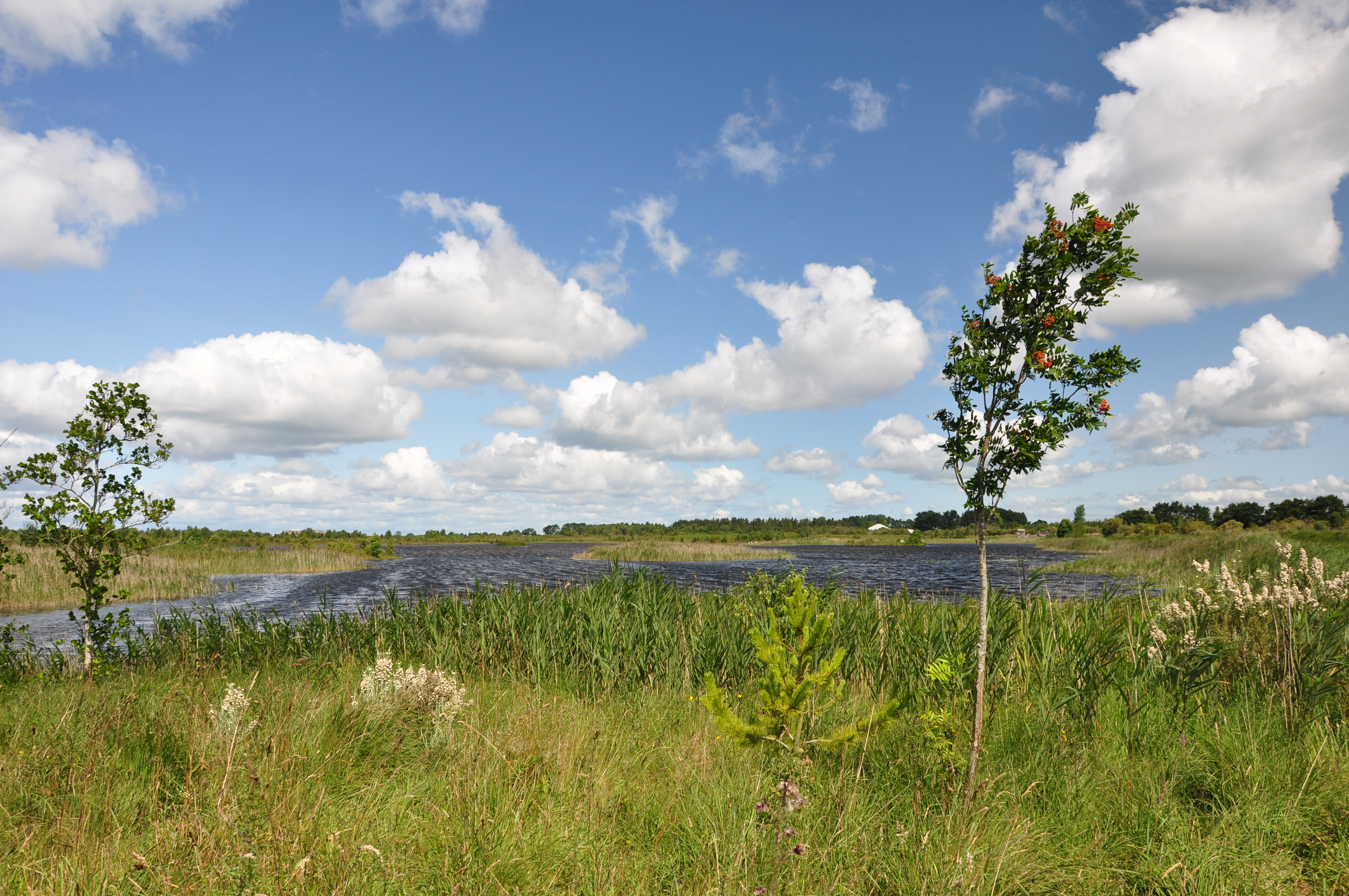
Lough Boora Parkland

Boora Bog (Irish Portach na Buaraí) is a cutaway peat bog situated in County Offaly, Ireland. Peat was harvested for fuel between the 1950s and 1970s, and the land is now being reclaimed for agricultural and eco-tourism use. There was a lake called Lough Boora (Loch na Buaraí), which was drained by Bord na Móna, but was not used for peat production: this area is now maintained as a nature reserve by the Irish Wildlife Trust. There are two angling lakes.

== Archaeology ==
In 1977, a prehistoric site was discovered at Lough Boora. Excavations revealed a temporary settlement dated to the Mesolithic era. No structures were discovered, but stone axe heads, arrow heads, and blades were discovered, surrounding a series of fire sites. The finds were dated to approximately between 6800 BCE and 6000 BCE.

== Sculpture Park ==
Sculpture in the Parklands is a 50-acre (200,000 m^{2}) land and environmental sculpture park located in Boora Bog. The first artworks were commissioned in 2002 during a symposium where seven Irish and international artists worked over a three-week residency period. Eight large, site-specific sculptures were created during the symposium, blending into the natural environment and the industrial legacy of the bog lands. The park can be visited all year round.

== Wildlife ==
Boora is the Irish stronghold of the grey partridge. A conservation project funded by the National Parks and Wildlife Service has turned the fortunes of the species around from a critically low 22 to 932 birds. Other species seen regularly include hen harrier, common buzzard, cuckoo, merlin, green sandpiper and ruff. Over 130 species of resident and migrant birds have been recorded in the discovery park, and the mammals present include deer, a herd of wild goats, badgers, hares and bats.
