= Rahan, County Offaly =

Village and parish in County Offaly, Ireland

Rahan Raithean
- Parish/Village
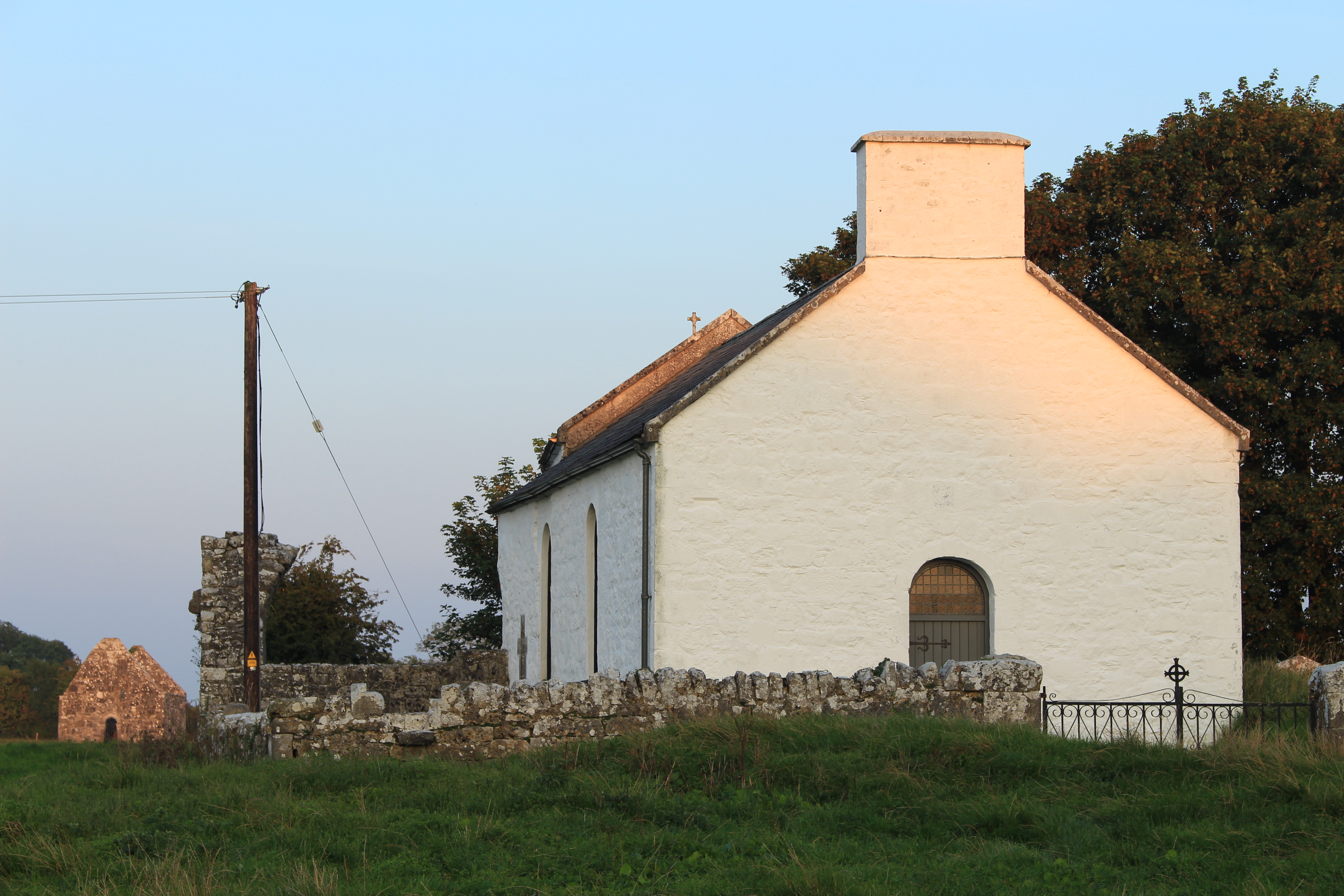
- Rahan Churches

- Location of Rahan within County Offaly in the Republic of Ireland
- Coordinates: 53.280541°N 7.615762°W
- Country: Ireland
- Province: Leinster
- County: County Offaly
- Elevation: 50 m (160 ft)
- Irish grid reference: N256256

Rahan (Irish: Raithean) is a parish and village in County Offaly, Ireland. It is associated with medieval abbot Mochuda (also known as St. Carthage). The village is located on the banks of the river Clodagh, approximately 8 km from Tullamore. The parish of Rahan extends from The Island near Ballycumber in the north, to Mucklagh in the south.

== History ==
=== First monastery ===
The first monastery in Rahan was created by Camelacus in the 5th century and later re-founded in the 6th century by St Carthage. The ancient monasteries and churches located here are known as the church of St Carthage or St Carthach, and the monastery of Mochuda. Saint Fiodhairle repaired the Rahan Abbey after a Viking raid.

A mass rock (where mass was said while the Penal Laws were in effect) can be found near the Present Catholic Church in the Killina townland, approximately 1 km southeast of the ancient churches. The rock is dedicated to Saint Anthony.

Rahan also has a long association with the Jesuit community who founded a seminary there in the early 19th century (1818) and with the Presentation Sisters who founded a convent and school in the early 19th century (1818 also), both Convent and School have survived to this day. The Presentation Mission to India went out from here in the past.

=== Ancient churches and monastic site ===
The monastic site in Rahan contains the remains of church buildings dating from the 11th and 12th centuries and both Protestant and Catholic cemeteries.

In 1732, the Church of St Carthage at Rahan was repaired by the Church of Ireland community for use as a parish church.

Mass is celebrated here once a year on Cemetery Sunday 15 August. Access can be gained through a farm gate.

== Parish of Rahan ==
The parish of Rahan comprises 44 townlands: Agall, Aghadonagh, Aghalusky, Backsteel, Ballina, Ballincloghan, Ballincur, Ballindrinan, Ballybruncullin, Ballykeenaghan, Blackwood, Bohernagrisna, Brackagh, Cappaloughan, Castletown, Church Hill, Clonshanny, Corcush, Cornalaur, Currygurry, Deerpark, Derries, Derrinvullig, Derrooly, Derrycooly, Derryesker, Derrynanagh, Glasshouse, Goldsmiths Lot, Kilgortin, Killaranny, Killina, Kilpatrick, Loughroe, Mountarmstrong, Murragh, Newtown, Oldtown, Rabbitburrow, Rahan Demesne, Roscore Demesne, Tullybeg and Tullymorerahan.

The parish contains three churches, a Presentation Convent, two primary schools and a secondary school.

=== Churches ===
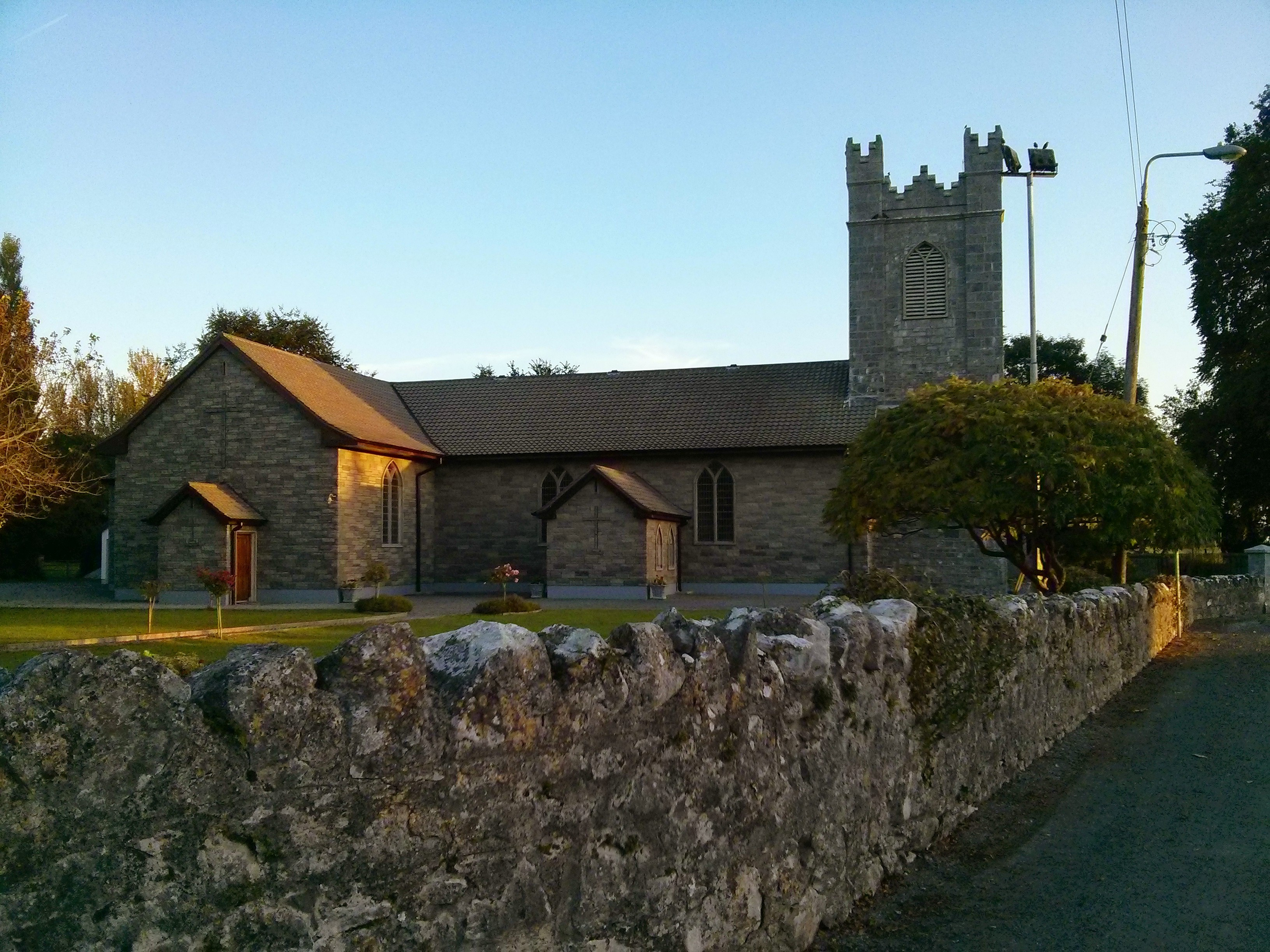
St. Carthage's Church, Killina

St. Carthage's Church Killina was built in the mid 1700s. During a reconstruction in 1966, traces of a previous church were found. Side aisles were added to the church between 1800 and 1817. The title was originally the Church of the Assumption but was later changed to that of St. Carthage.

St Patrick's Church, The Island was built by a Fr. Robbins, who was curate in Rahan from 1834 to 1847. The Island was once called the 'Island of Clonkeen'.

St. Colman’s Church Mucklagh was built in 1979. Very Rev. J. Mooney and Father Sean Heaney lead the project. The previous church was demolished.

=== Education ===
Schools in the area include St Colman's National School (Mucklagh), Scoil Charthaigh Naofa (Newtown, Rahan), and Killina Presentation Secondary School (Killina).

== Gallery ==
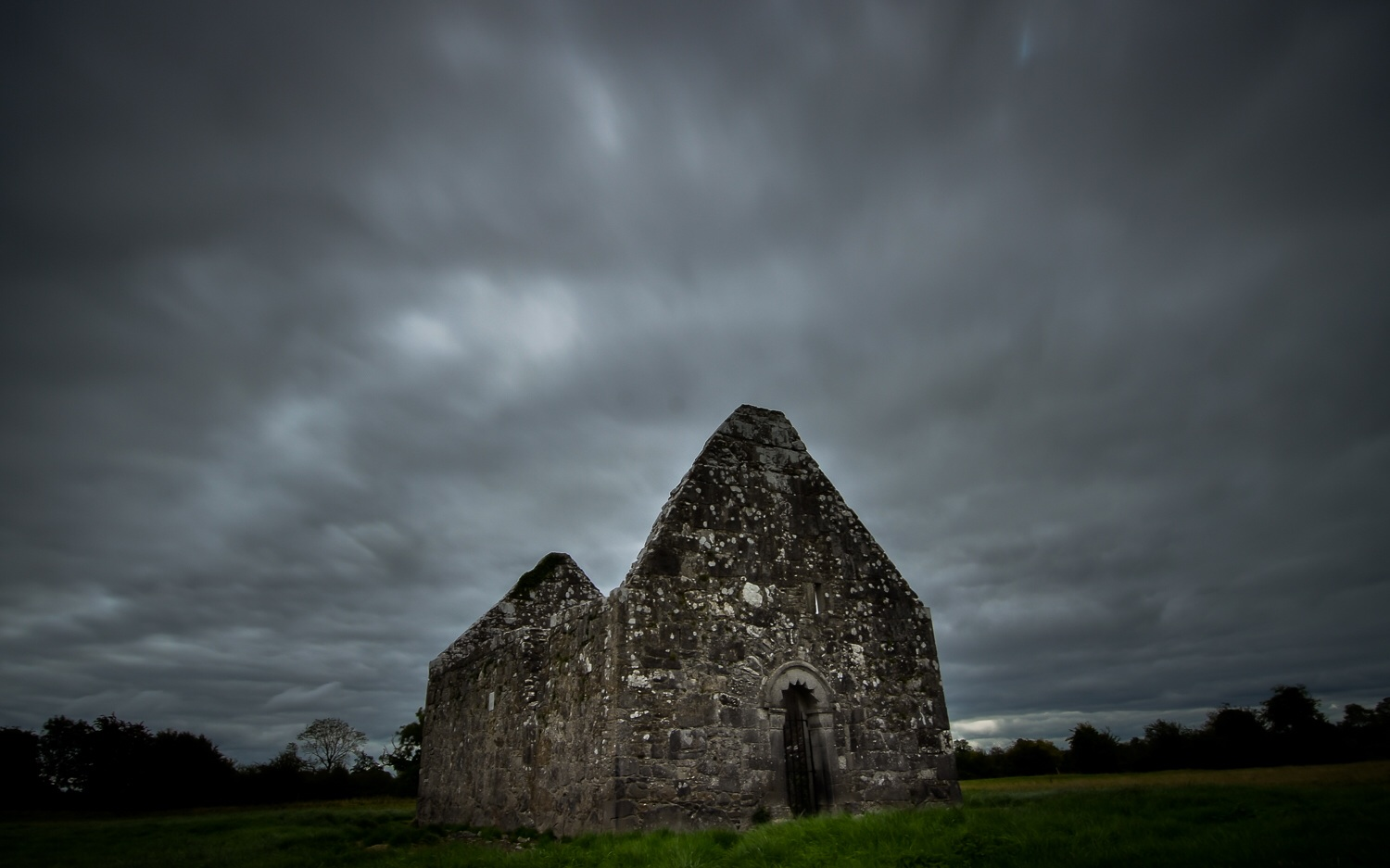
Rahan 5

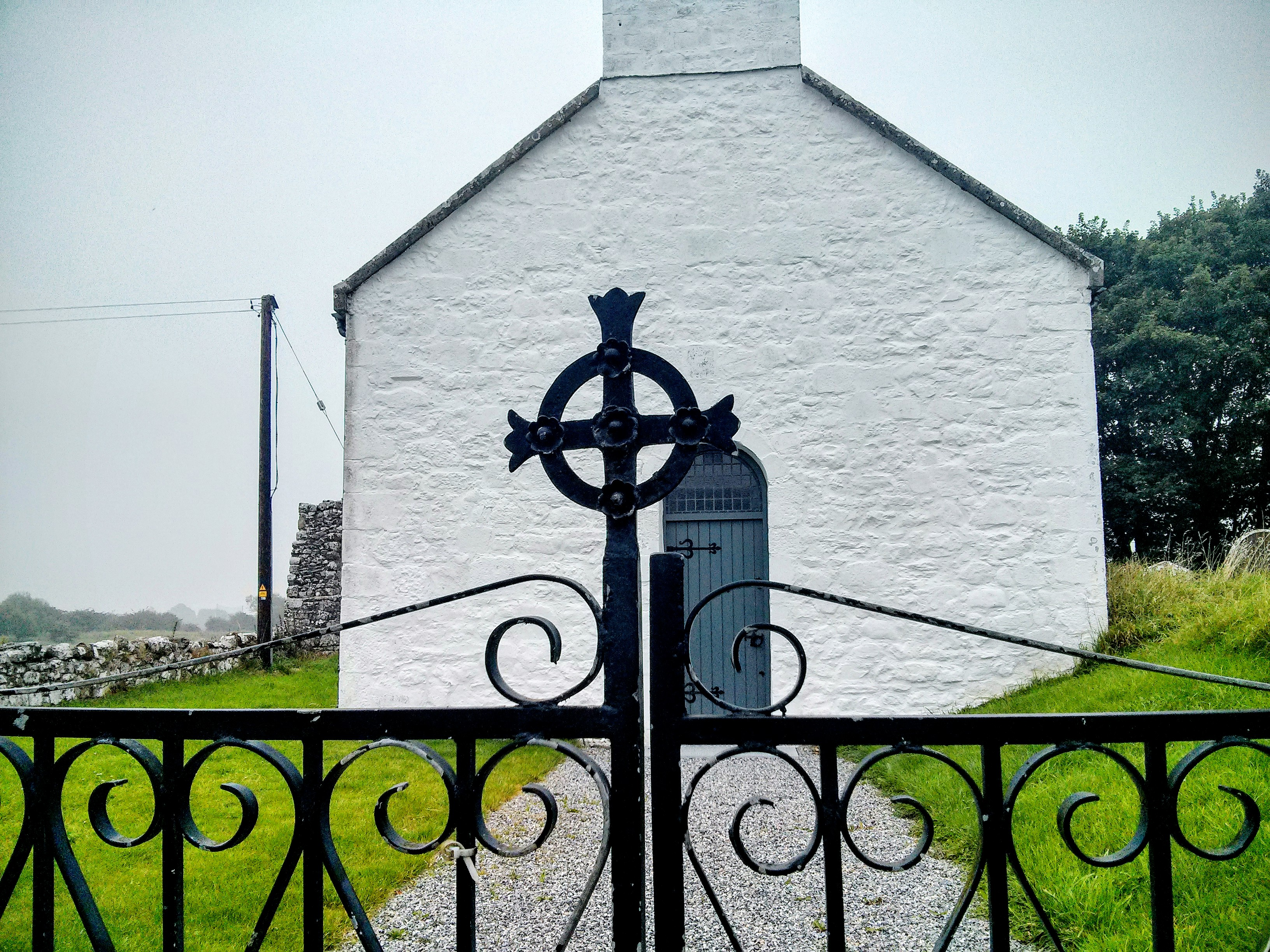
Rahan ancient church

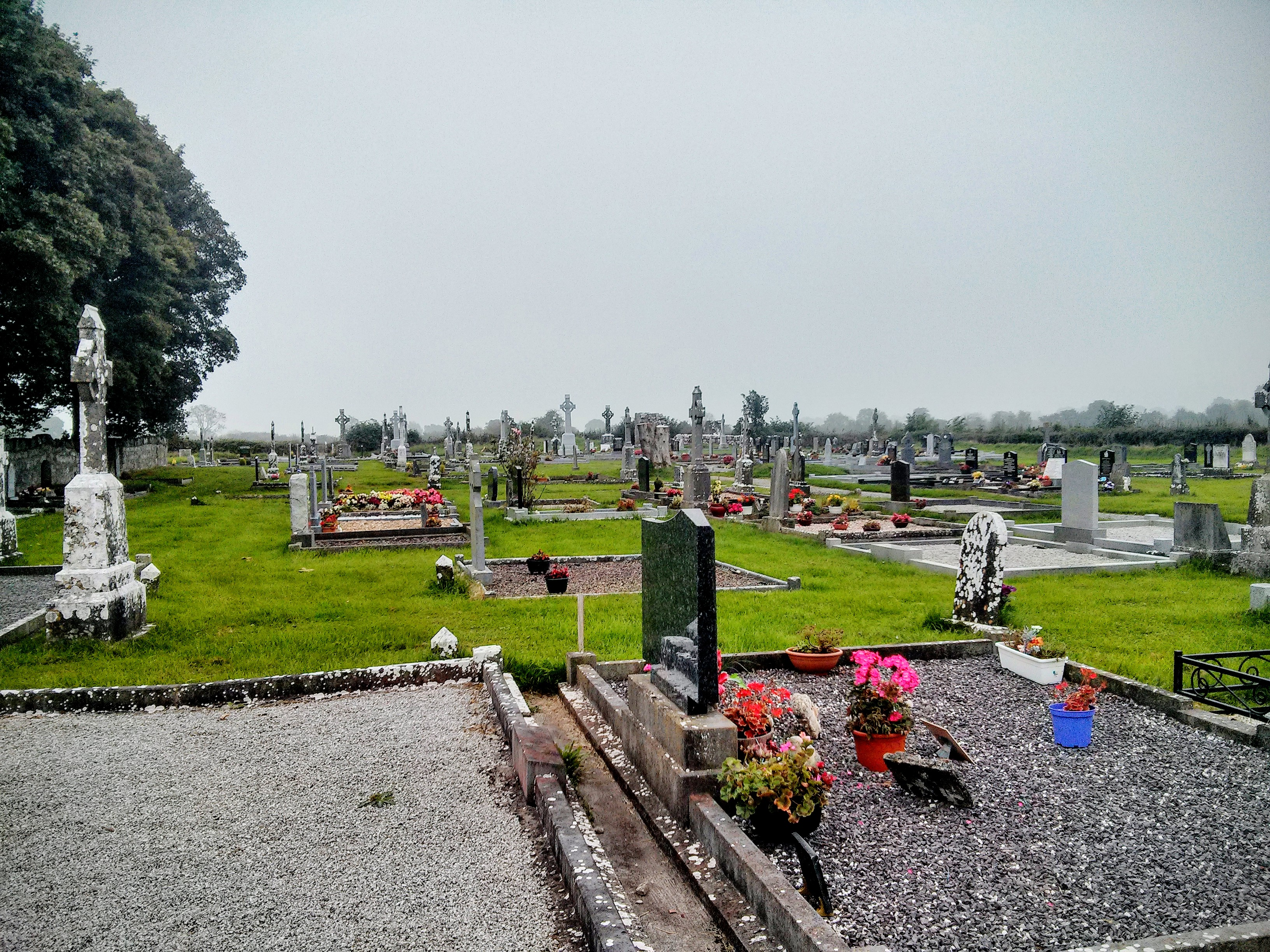
Graveyard at monastic site

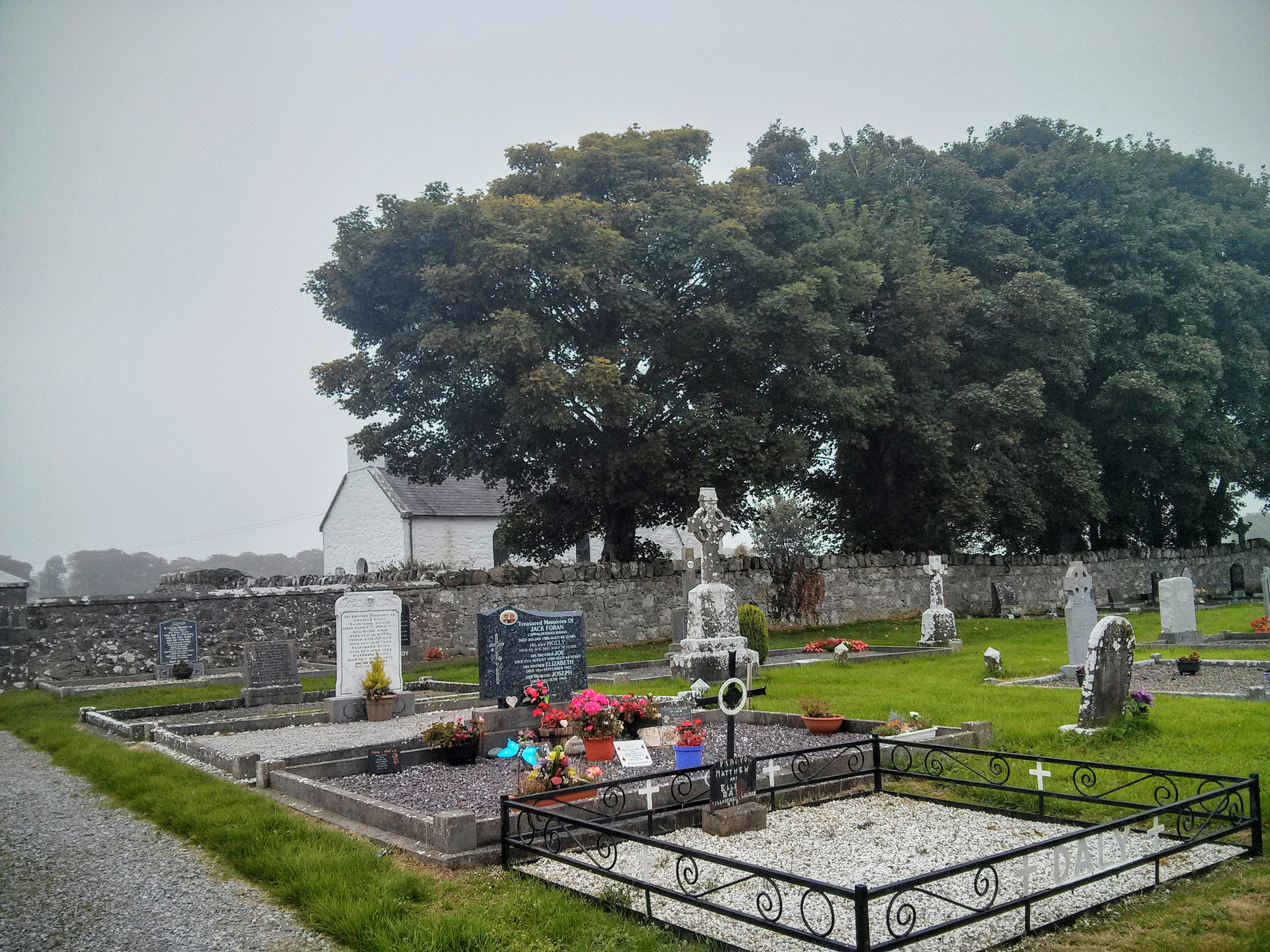
Graveyard at monastic site

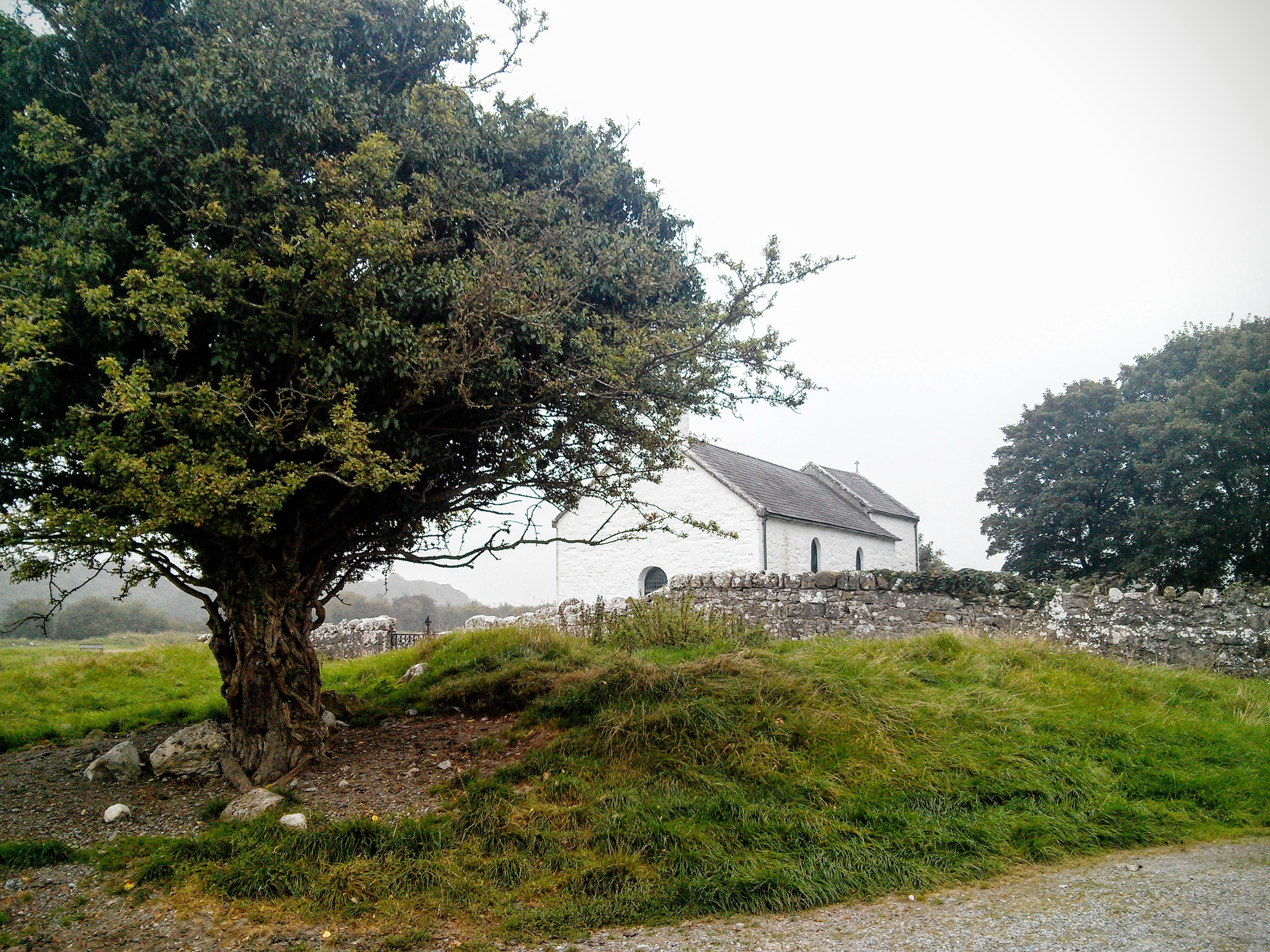
Rahan ancient church

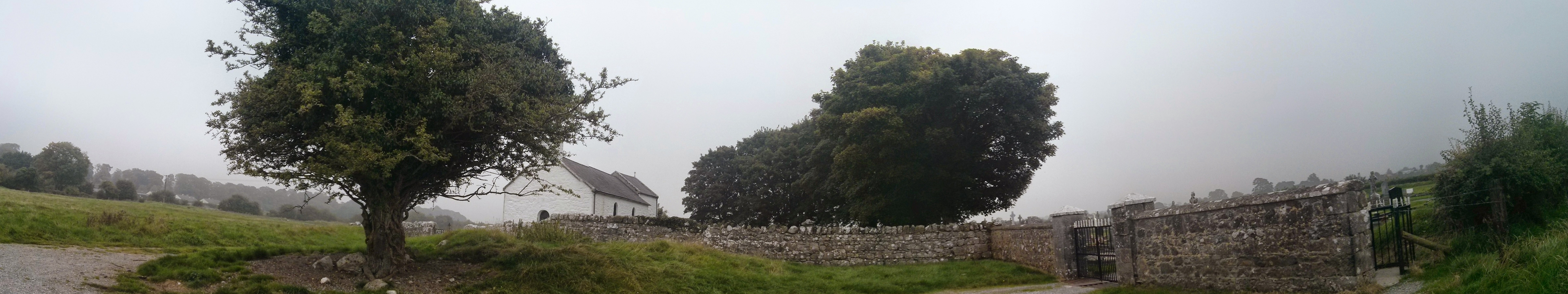
Wide view
