= Silver River (Ireland) =

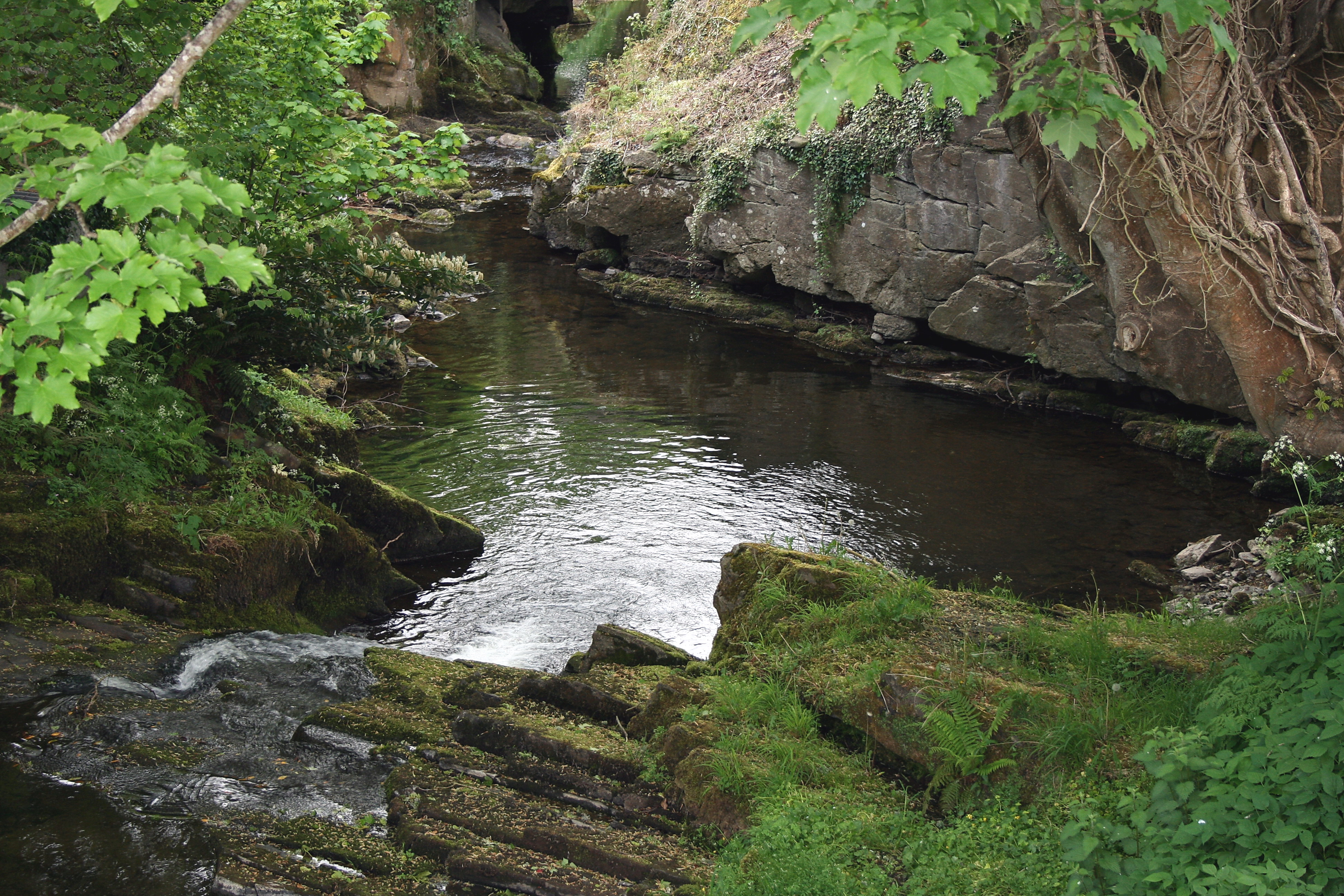
- Silver River in Cadamstown

Physical characteristics
- Source
  - location: Slieve Bloom Mountains
- Mouth
  - location: Atlantic Ocean as the River Shannon

The Silver River (Irish: Abhainn Airgid) is a river that flows through principally though the south of County Offaly in central Ireland. Its source is in the Slieve Bloom Mountains. The village of Cadamstown, on the river, is home to the Silver River Geological Reserve.

== Course ==
The Silver rises on the northwestern slopes of Baureigh Mountain (486 m) and descends to Cadamstown, the first settlement it encounters. Flowing westwards it passes Ballyboy and Kilcormac before turning north to join the River Brosna near Ferbane. The Brosna flows west from the confluence to join the River Shannon at Shannon Harbour.

The Silver River is mostly within County Offaly but flows briefly within County Westmeath.
