= Ballyboy =

Village in County Offaly, Ireland

Ballyboy Baile Átha Buí
- Village
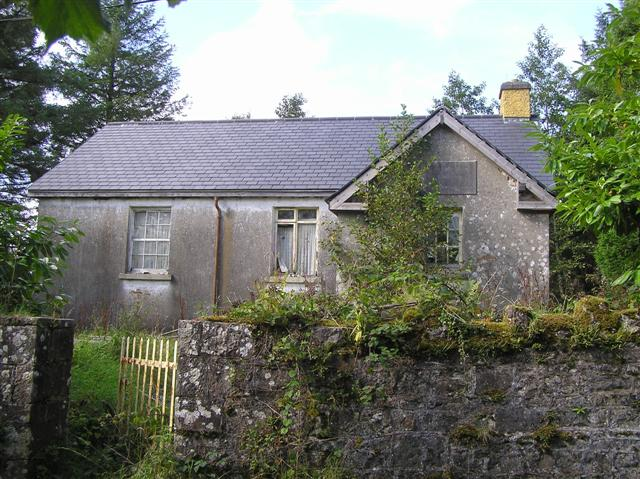
- Ballyboy National School

- Location in Ireland
- Coordinates: 53.1736°N 7.6976°W
- Country: Ireland
- Province: Leinster
- County: Offaly

Ballyboy or Ballaboy (Irish: Baile Átha Buí, meaning 'settlement of the yellow ford') is a village in County Offaly, Ireland. It is about two kilometres east of Kilcormac. The village is in a civil parish of the same name.

Prior to the Plantations of Ireland, Ballyboy was ruled by O'Molloy in a territory known as Firceall which was allied to the Kingdom of Meath. When the Gaelic chieftains were removed from power following the English Plantations, Firceall was broken up with Ballyboy forming its own barony within the then newly formed King's County (now County Offaly).

Although now a small village of several houses, a pub and a primary school, it was an important and thriving hub in the Middle Ages. During this era, the town had a hat and glove factory, and a mill which was used for making flour, grinding corn and cutting timber. The ruins of the mill are still standing today on the road from the village to Ballyoran. The mill, one of several in the area, was powered by water from the Silver River which is a tributary of the River Brosna.

There is also a ring fort in the village environs which legend has it is linked by a tunnel to the Ballyboy church about 400 metres distant. The church in Ballyboy was originally a Catholic Church but was later dedicated as a Church of Ireland church. It is now derelict and in ruins.
