= Jantjies =

Jantjies is a surname of South African origin. It is a diminutive form of the Dutch name "Jan", the equivalent of "John". The Afrikaans diminutive suffix "-tjies" indicates a patronymic origin. Associated names include Jans, Jansen, Janssen and Janse. Notable people with the surname include:

- Elton Jantjies (born 1990), South African rugby union player
- Eugene Jantjies (born 1986), Namibian rugby union player
- Herschel Jantjies (born 1996), South African rugby union player
- Reggie Jantjies, South African soccer player
- Theodore Jantjies (born 1983), South African actor
- Tony Jantjies (born 1992), South African rugby union player
