= Emmen, Netherlands =

Emmen
- Municipality and city
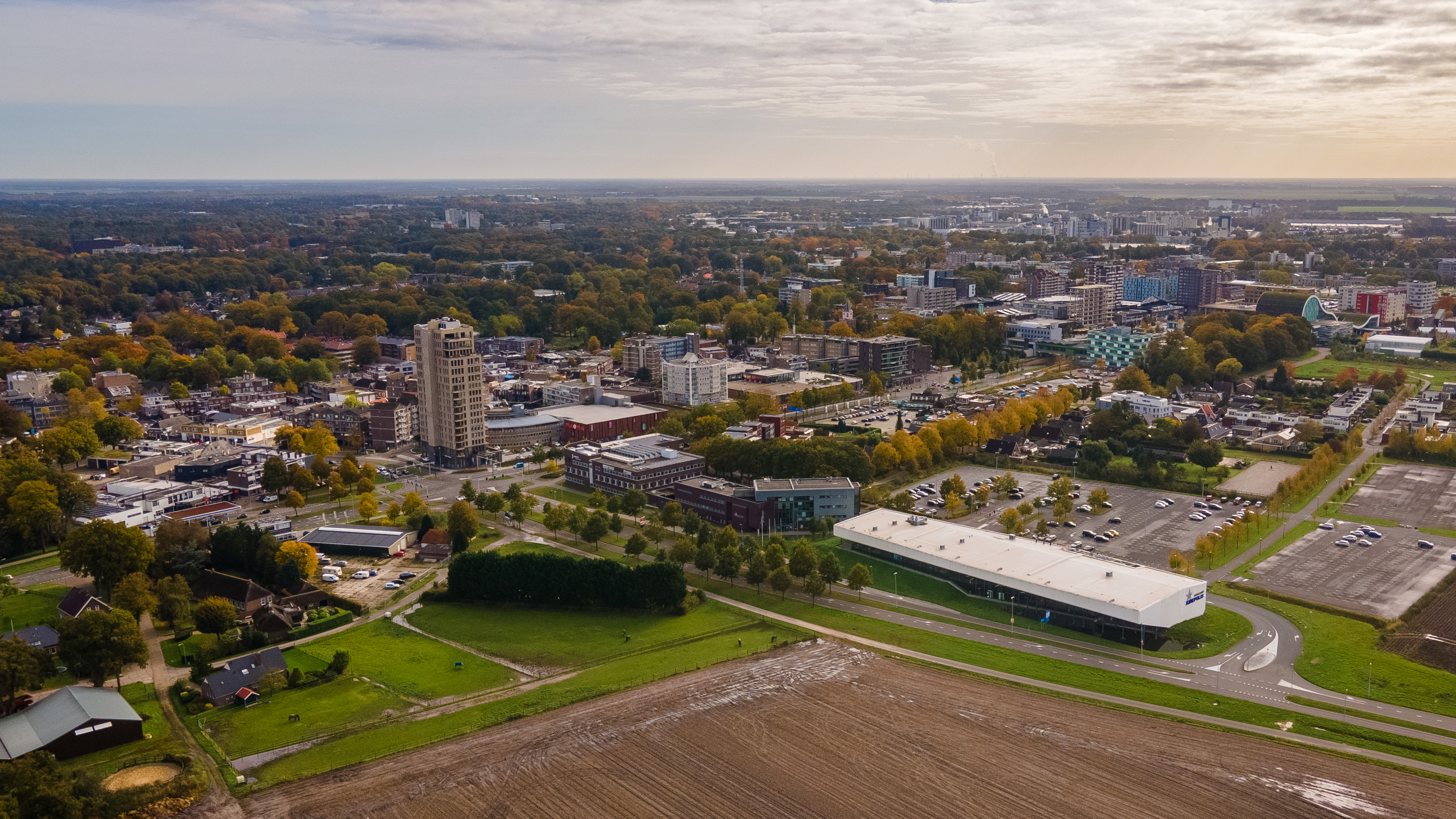
- Emmen centrum from above

- Flag Coat of arms Brandmark

- Location in Drenthe
- Coordinates: 52°47′N 6°54′E
- Country: Netherlands
- Province: Drenthe

Government
  - Body: Municipal council
  - Mayor: Eric van Oosterhout (PvdA)

Area
  - Total: 346.26 km^{2} (133.69 sq mi)
  - Land: 335.18 km^{2} (129.41 sq mi)
  - Water: 11.08 km^{2} (4.28 sq mi)
- Elevation: 23 m (75 ft)

Population (January 2021)
  - Total: 107,024
  - Density: 319/km^{2} (830/sq mi)
- Demonym: Emmenaar
- Time zone: UTC+1 (CET)
  - Summer (DST): UTC+2 (CEST)
- Postcode: Parts of 7700 and 7800 range
- Area code: 0524, 0591
- Website: gemeente.emmen.nl

Emmen (Dutch pronunciation: [ˈɛmə(n)]) is a municipality and city of the province of Drenthe in the northeastern Netherlands.

== History ==
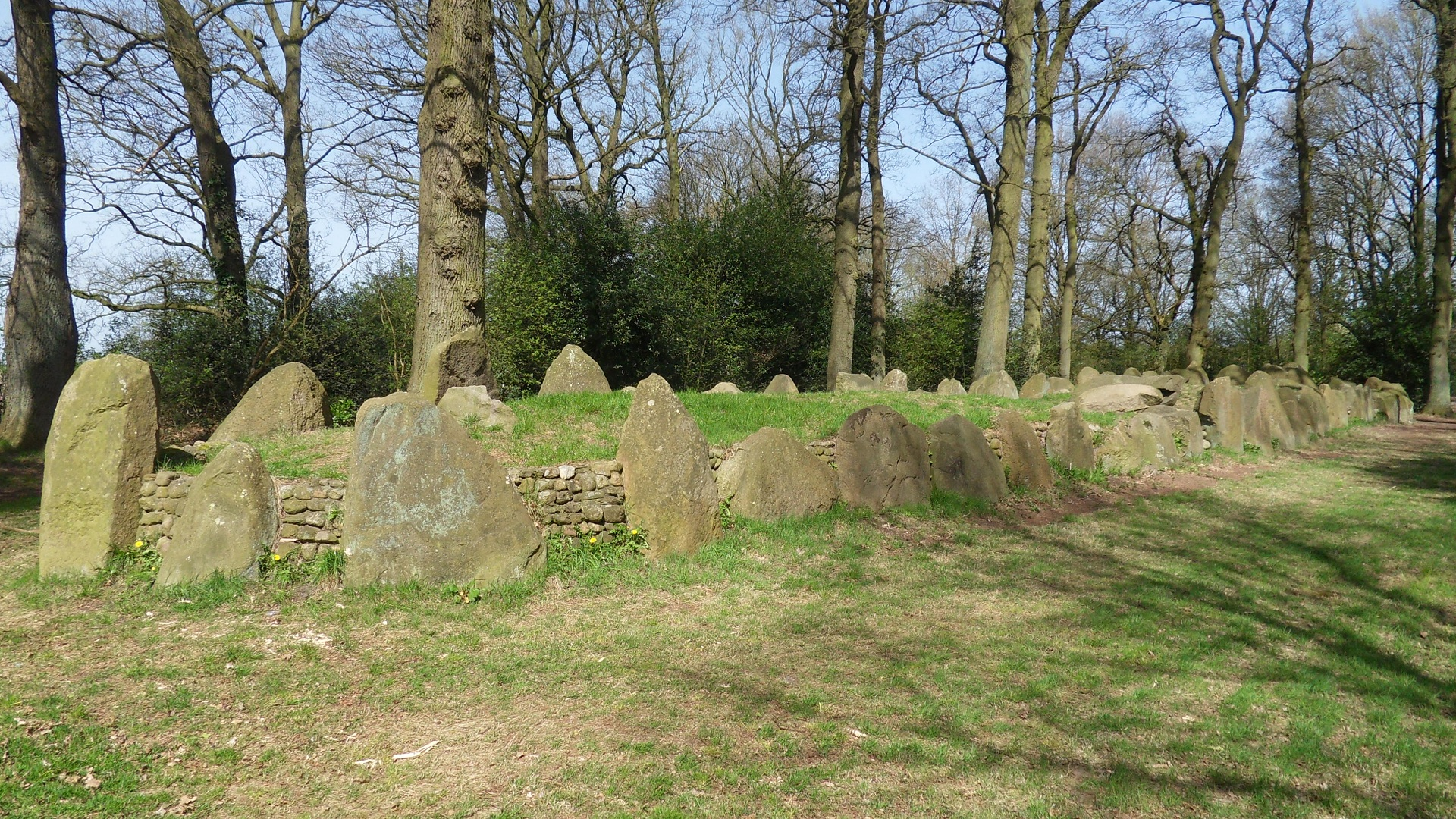
Dolmen in Emmen

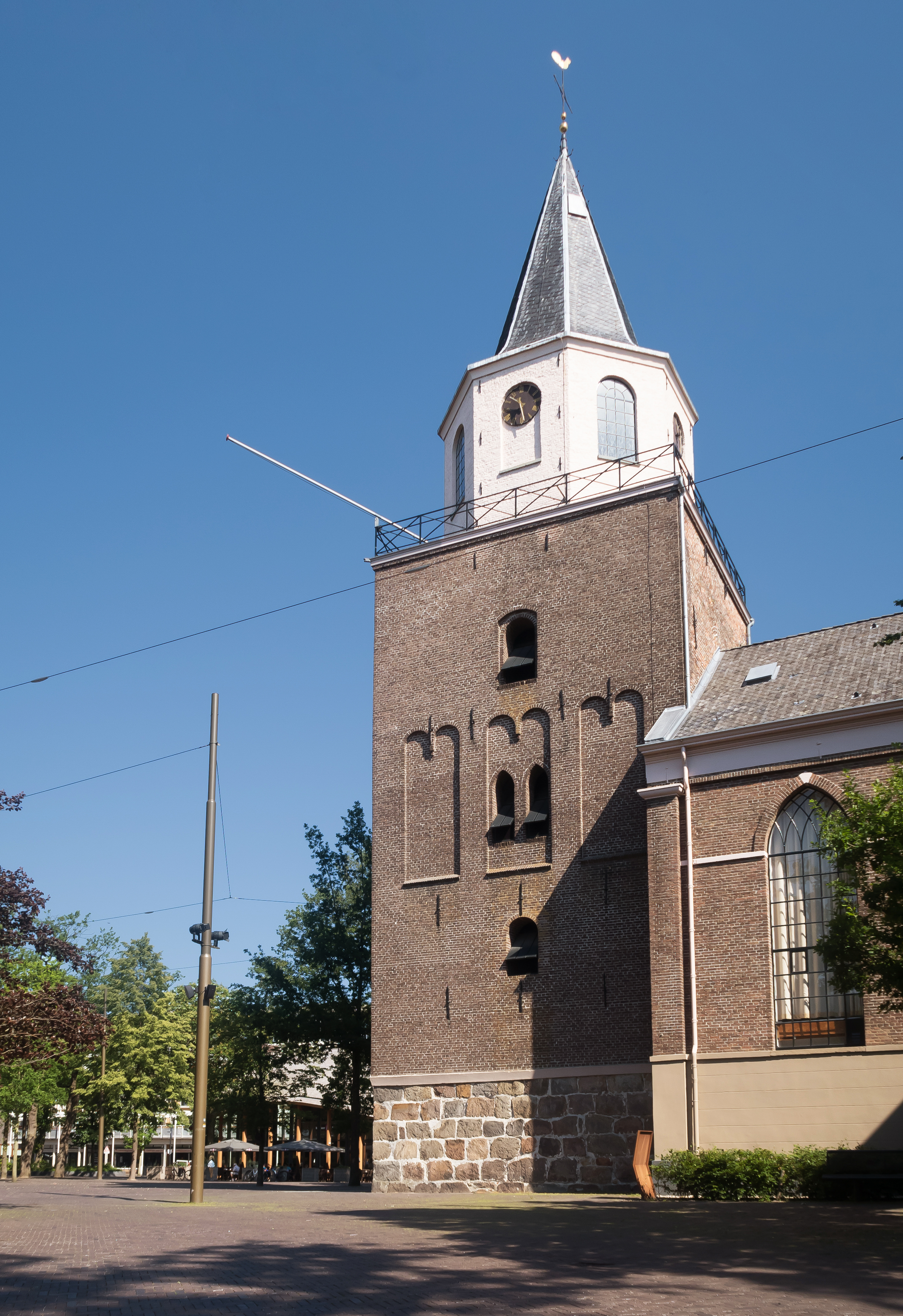
Grote of Pancratiuskerk

A planned city, Emmen arose from several small farming and peat-harvesting communities which have dotted the province of Drenthe since the Middle Ages. Traces of these communities can still be seen in the form of the villages of Westenesch, Noordbarge and Zuidbarge: they have a separate history and layout but are surrounded by the suburbs and the center of Emmen.

The expansion of the city did not happen until after the Second World War. Suburbs were built around the old center of Emmen, starting with Emmermeer directly to the north, and followed to the south-east by Angelslo (for which an old village of the same name was demolished), Emmerhout (famed at the time for being separated from the city by an existing forest) to the east, Bargeres, the Rietlanden and Parc Sandur to the south and south-west. Construction of the last suburb, called Delftlanden, is well underway with many homes already built and people living in the area.

There are few historic landmarks left within the city, but those few include the church on the market square, where a church has been standing since the Middle Ages, the court of law building, dating from the beginning of the twentieth century, and the post office from the same time. In the city's environs, an earthwork by Robert Smithson, "Broken Circle/Spiral Hill", may be found.

In 1957 it hosted the 1st Women's Chess Olympiad.

The prime economic booster since the 1980s has been the zoo, the Dierenpark Emmen. Begun in the 1930s, it was almost completely redesigned in the 1970s and is now co-owned by the municipality of Emmen. It attracts over 1.5 million visitors per year. It was replaced by Wildlands in 2016, when the old zoo closed. Important industries include Teijin Aramid, DSM Engineering Plastics, Wellman and Diolen Industrial Fibers (currently Senbis Polymer Innovations). There are extensive glasshouse complexes for horticulture, especially in the Klazienaveen-Erica area. The municipality offers some 38,000 jobs.

Emmen is the most populous urban area of Drenthe. The municipality of Emmen is one of the largest in the Netherlands, although the area outside the city borders of Emmen is rather rural. The other villages of importance are Emmer-Compascuum, Klazienaveen, Nieuw-Amsterdam, Zwartemeer, Nieuw-Amsterdam, Veenoord, Nieuw-Dordrecht, Nieuw-Schoonebeek, and Schoonebeek.

== Geography ==
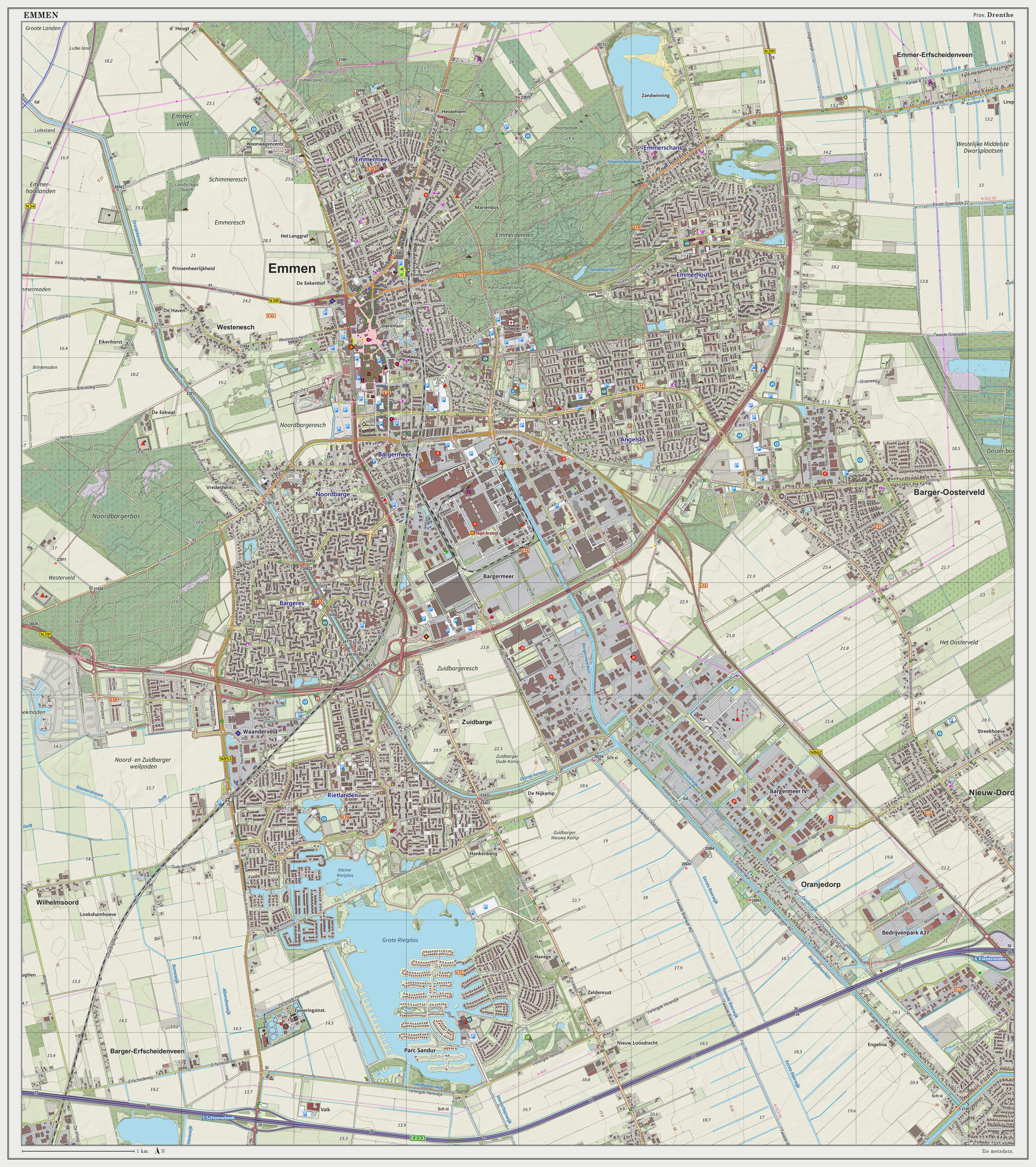
Dutch Topographic map of Emmen (city), March 2014

The population centres:

- Barger-Compascuum
- Emmen
- Emmer-Compascuum
- Erica
- Klazienaveen
- Nieuw-Amsterdam
- Nieuw-Dordrecht
- Nieuw-Schoonebeek
- Nieuw-Weerdinge
- Roswinkel
- Schoonebeek
- Veenoord
- Weiteveen
- Zwartemeer

== Demographics ==
The municipality of Emmen has some 107,000 inhabitants, with 56,000 living in the city of Emmen. Compared to some 3,000 inhabitants in the nineteenth century, this illustrates Emmen's rapid growth in the past 150 years.

== Sports ==
The city's football club FC Emmen plays their home games in De Oude Meerdijk.

Every year a big cycle racing criterium called Gouden Pijl, where all the big names in bicycle sport come to Emmen for this event. Besides the bicycle race itself, the Gouden Pijl also includes cultural events like pop-concerts, etc. In 2008, the comeback concert of The Schizo's, the infamous local punk-band from the 1980s, was organized during the Gouden Pijl.

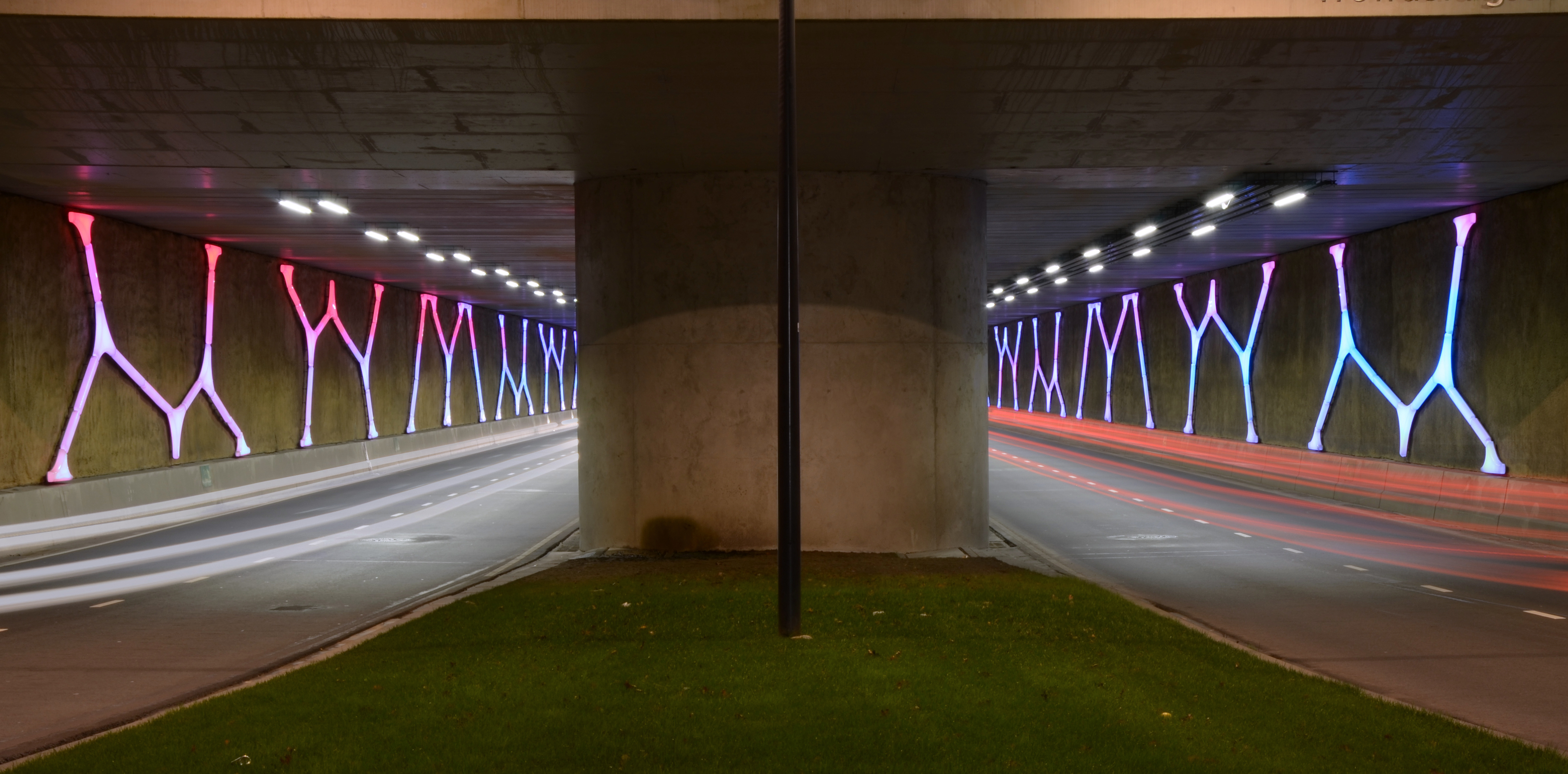
Hondsrugtunnel with light art: 'Dolmen Light' by Titia Ex

Speedway Emmen hosts regular Stock Car and Banger Racing along with the historic Oliebollen Race every December. Kartcircuit Pottendijk also holds regular kart races and rental kart sessions. Motodrome Emmen also holds regular rally bike races. The Motorsports facility is far outside Emmen and is closer to Emmer-Compascuum so it is not clear if it is situated in Emmen.

== Attractions ==
Attractions in Emmen are Wildlands Adventure Zoo Emmen, the inner city, the natural environment and the Rensenpark which was previously the zoo called the Noorder Dierenpark but after Wildlands openened in 2016 became the Rensenpark named after the zoo founders the Rensen family (with among others the Museum of Contemporary Tibetan Art). There is also Museum Collectie Brands in the adjacent village of Nieuw-Dordrecht.

== Gallery ==
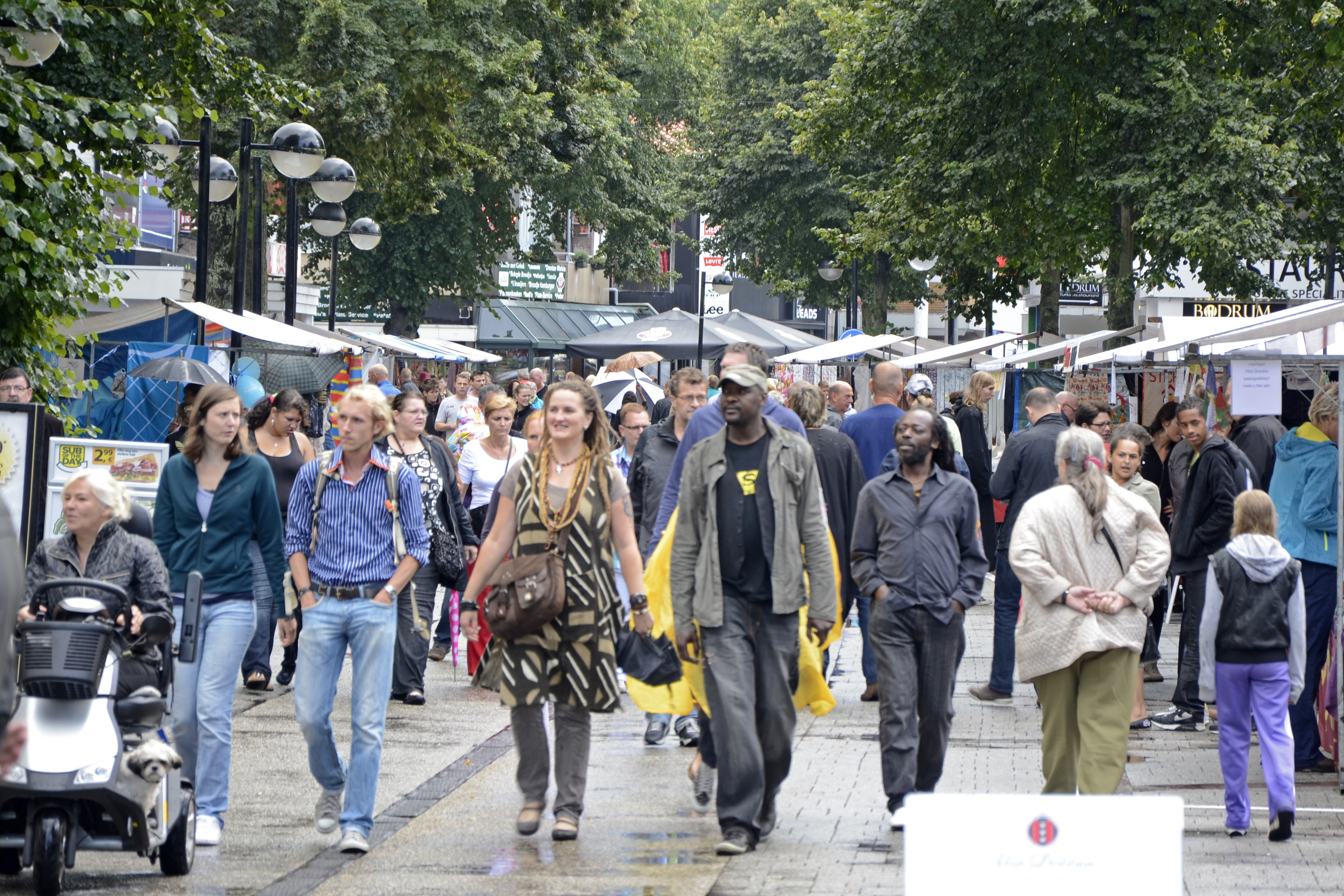
Mainstreet, center

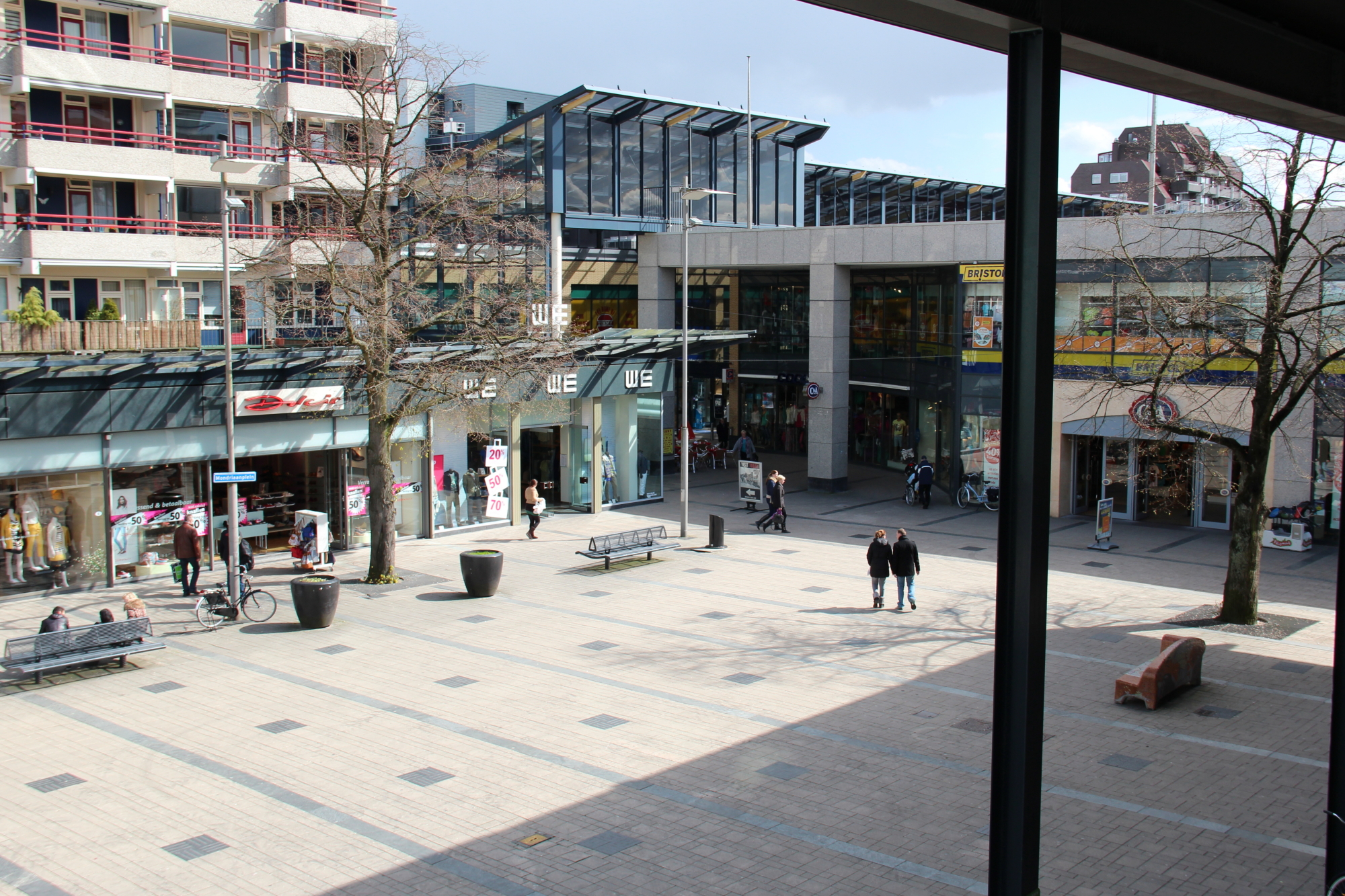
De Weiert, center

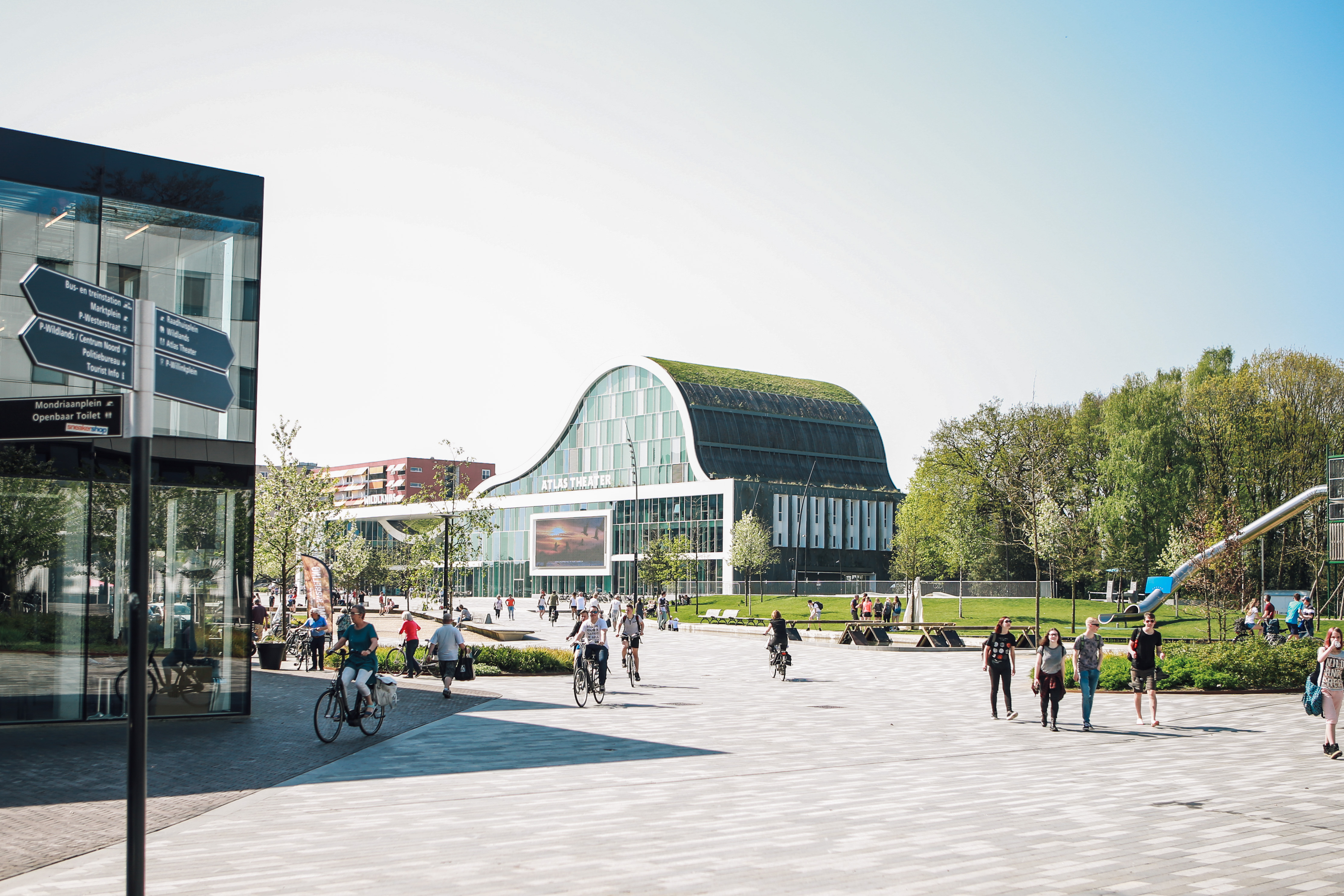
City square, center

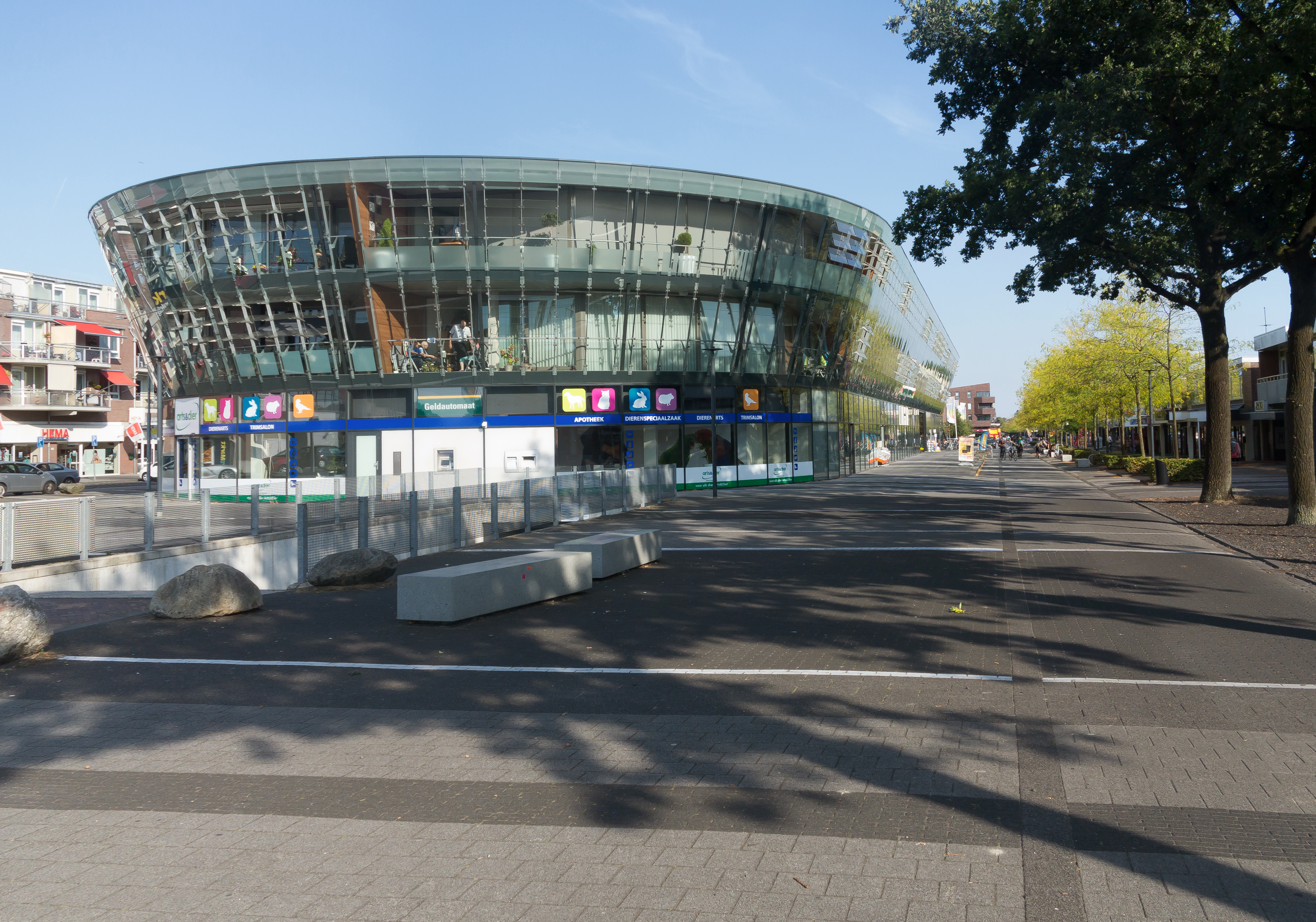
Klazienaveen

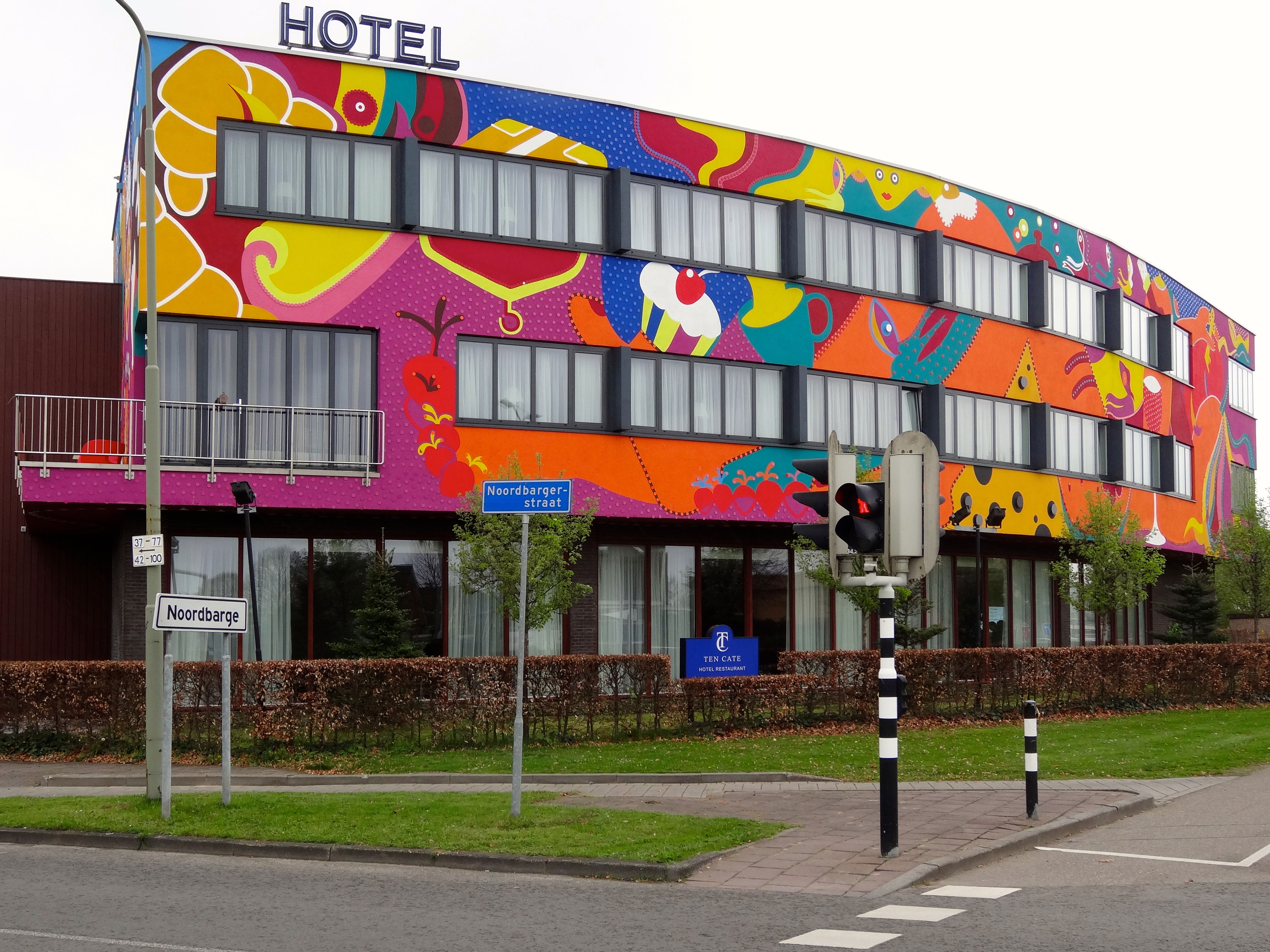
Ten Cate

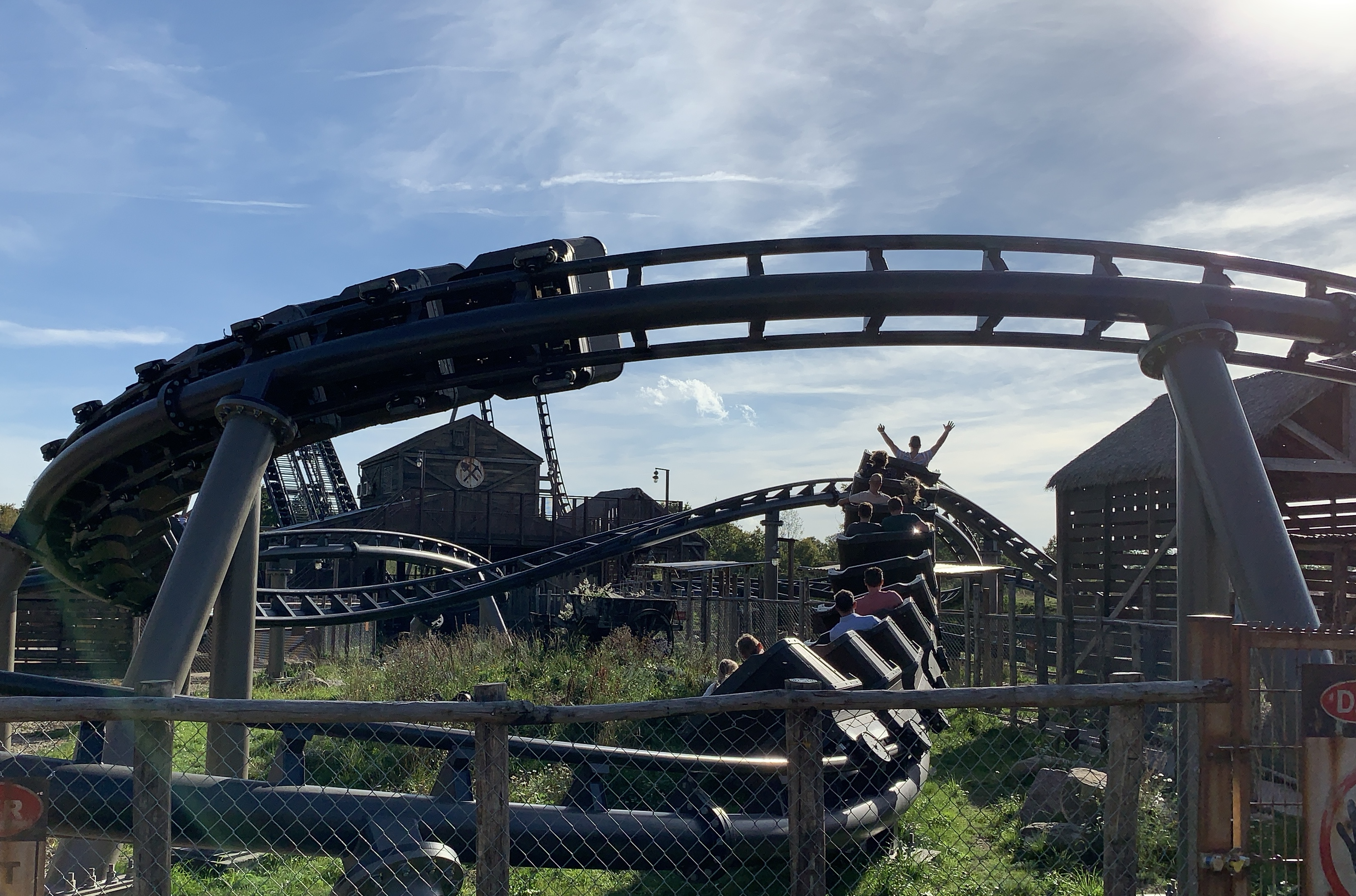
Wildlands Zoo

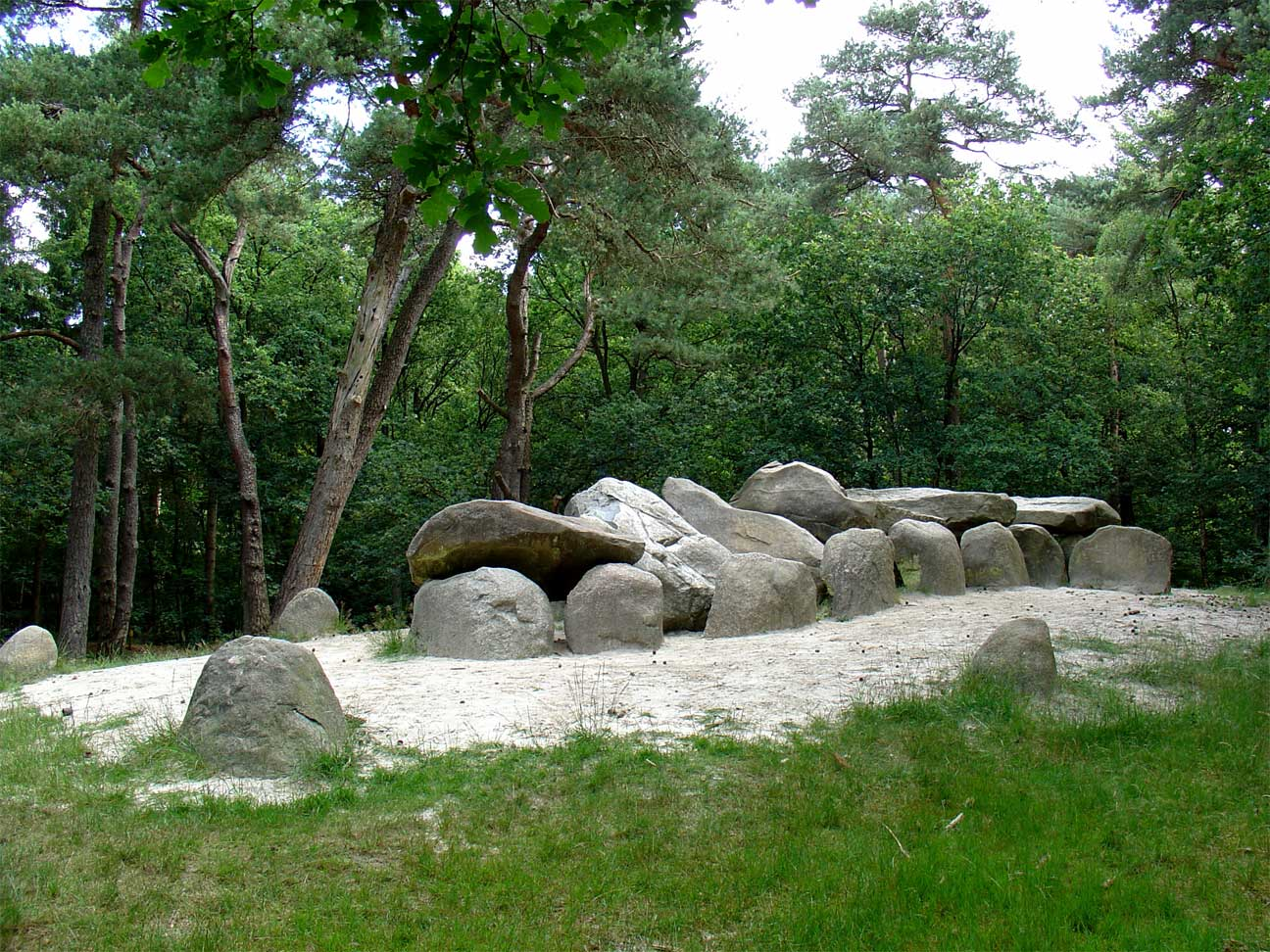
Dolmen, Emmerdennen

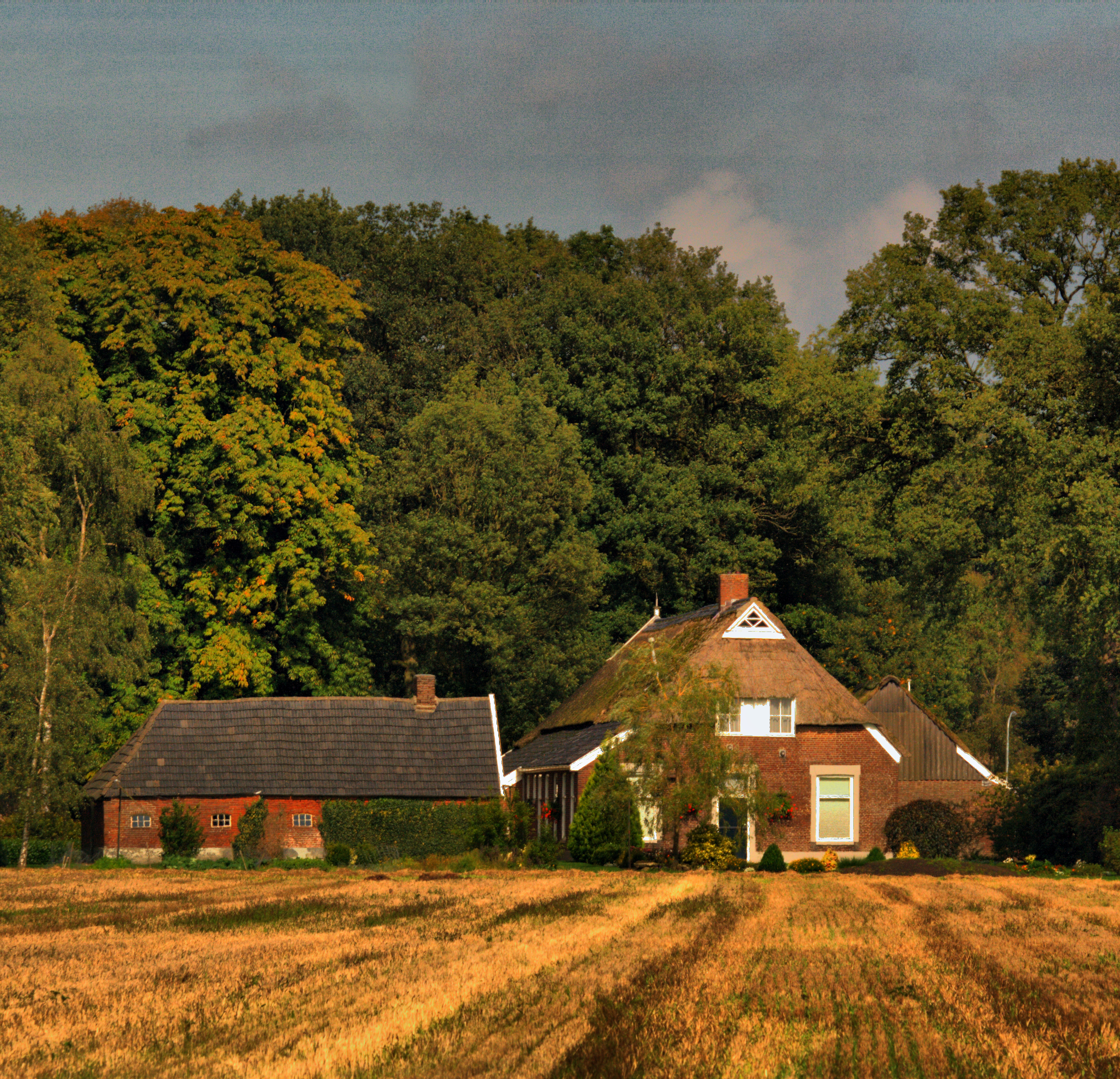
Zuidbarge

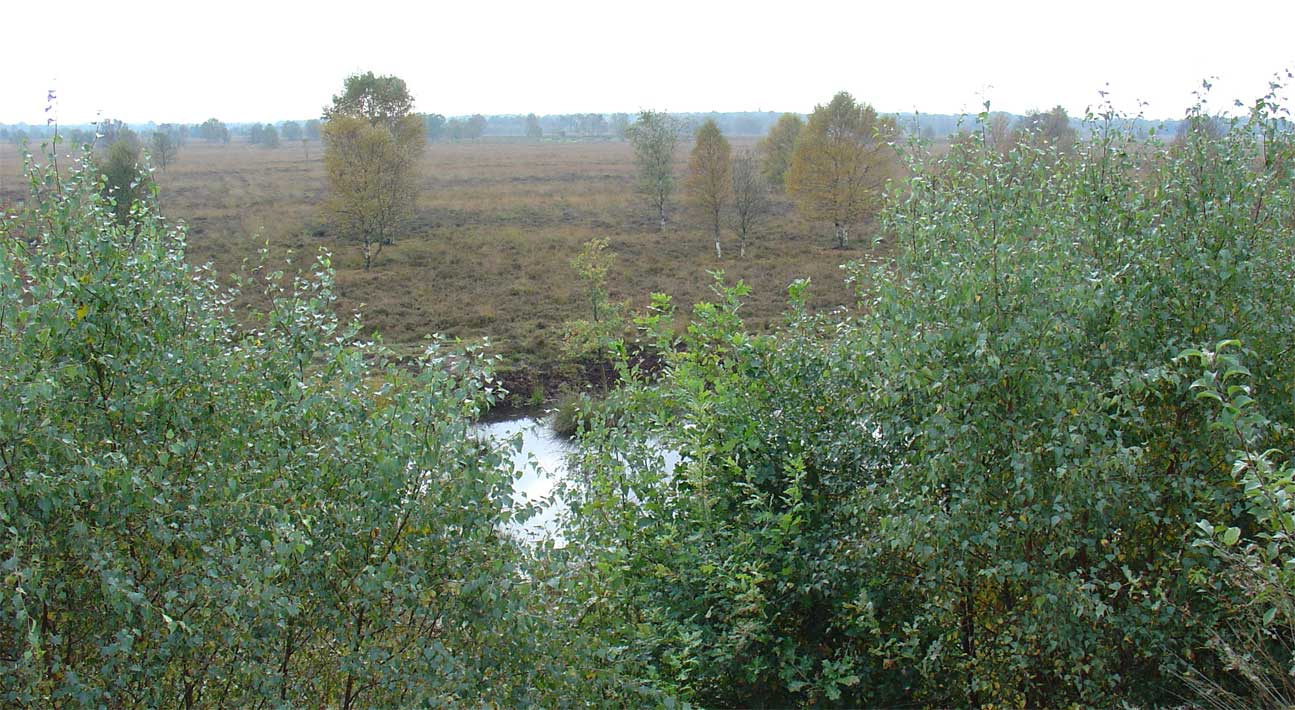
Bargerveen

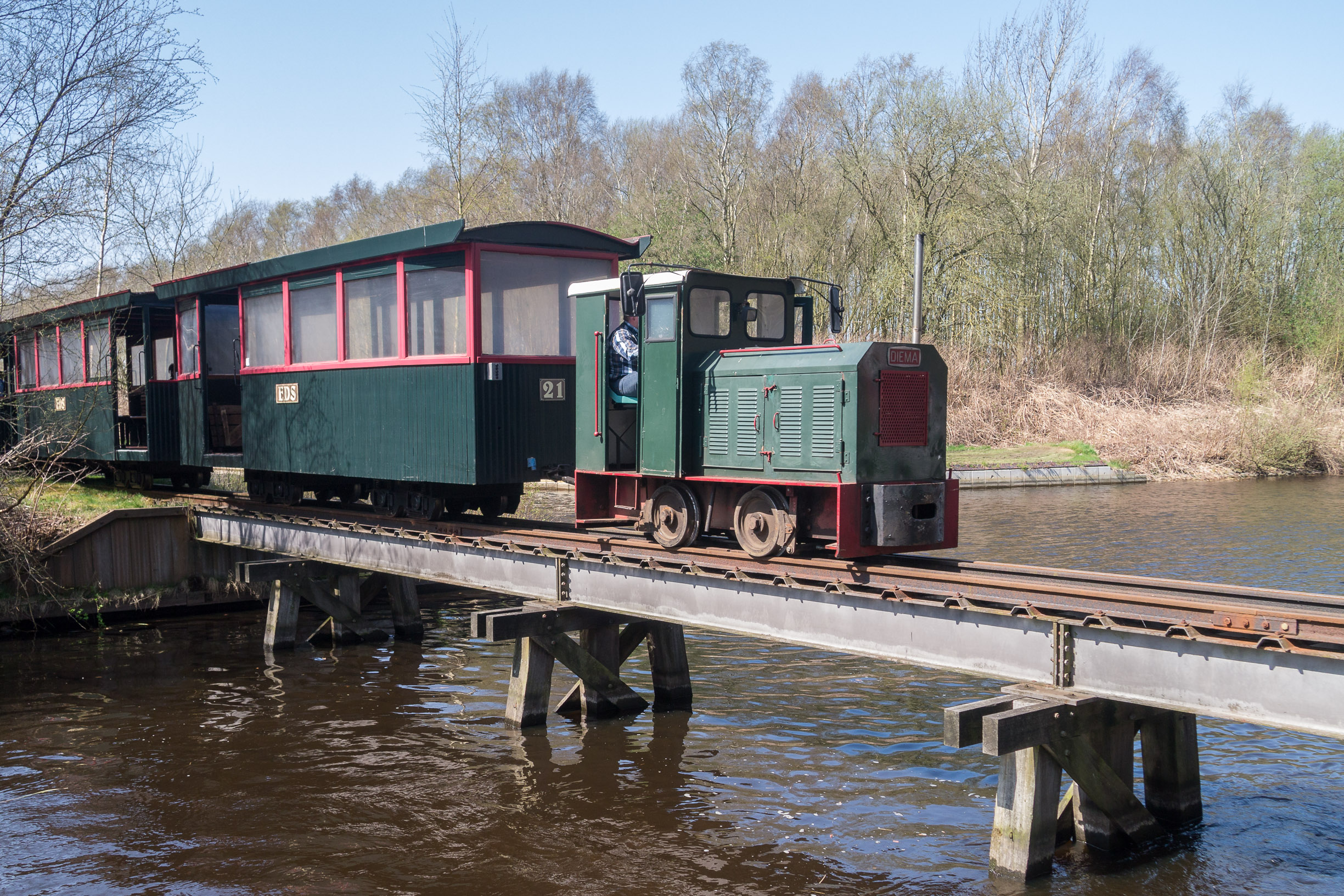
Het Veenpark

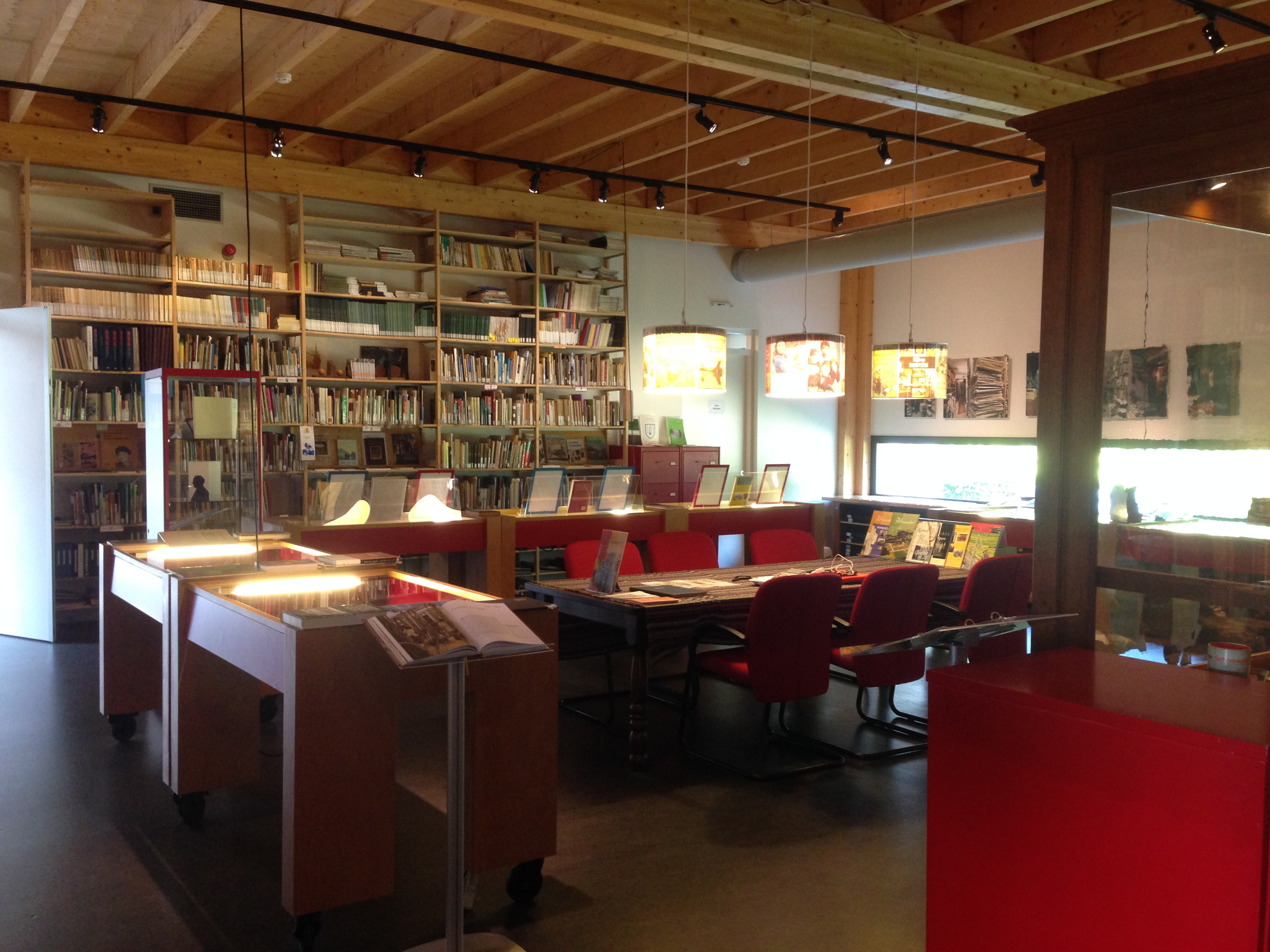
Museum Collectie Brands

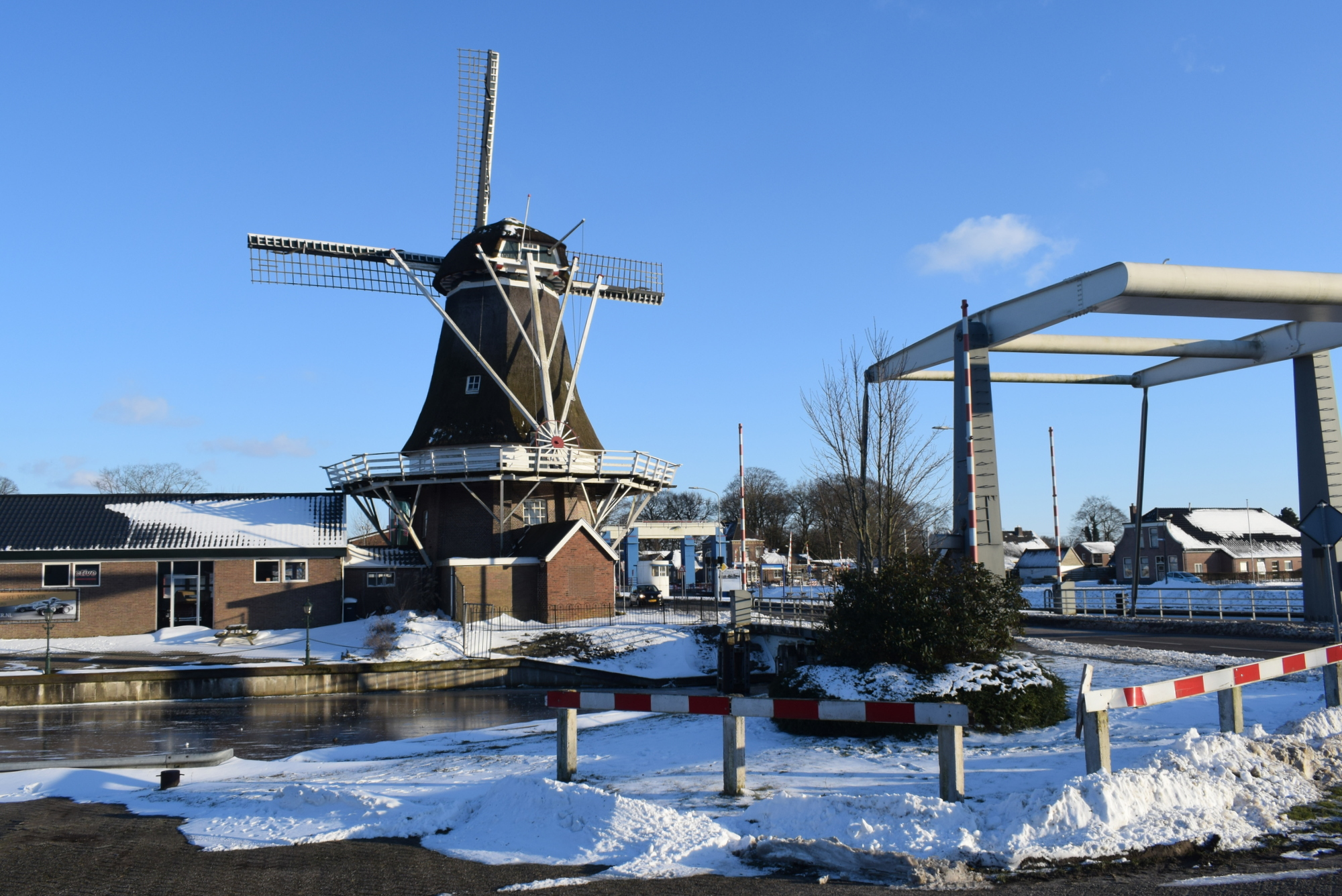
Veenoord

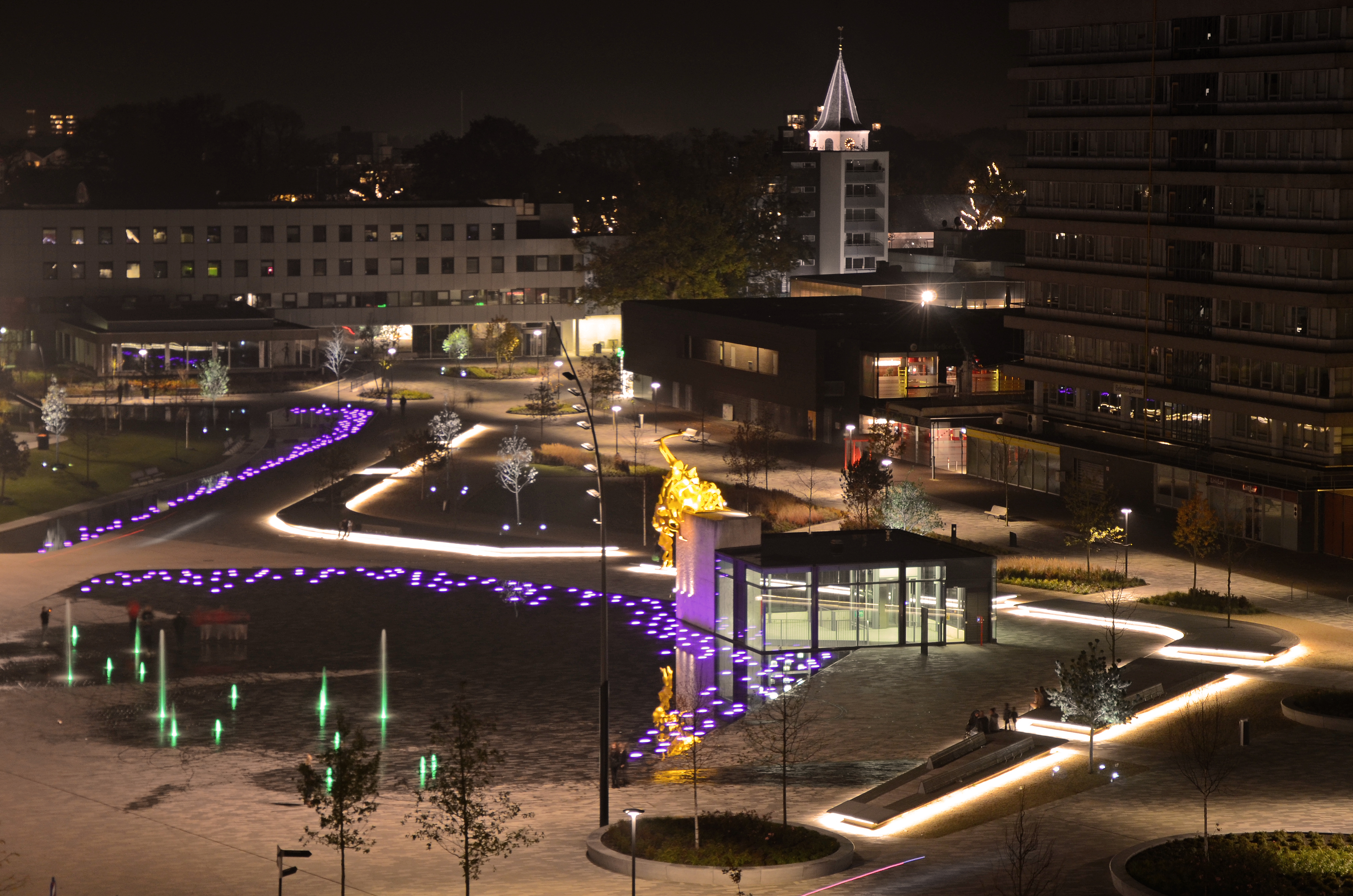
Raadhuisplein

== Transportation ==
Emmen is served by one train connection with Zwolle, which in turn leads to the rest of the country.

- Emmen railway station
- Emmen Zuid railway station
- Nieuw Amsterdam railway station

In addition, there are regular and frequent bus lines within Emmen and towards Groningen, Hoogeveen and Assen, as well as the surrounding countryside, and Meppen in Germany, departing from Emmen's two bus terminals.

By car, the city is accessible via the N34 from Ommen via Hardenberg and Coevorden towards Emmen, ending at the A28 motorway (Netherlands) towards Groningen near de Punt, the N381 to Drachten, the N391 to Veendam which goes through Emmen (with access to almost every district) and the A37 from Hoogeveen to Meppen in Germany, although this motorway is not directly next to Emmen. From the A37 to Emmen, there are three possibilities: at Junction Holsloot (A37 x N34), at Highway-exit Schoonebeek (A37 x N853), and Highway-exit Klazienaveen (A37 x N862). The A37 is also the quickest way towards the Randstad from Emmen. The A37 ends at the German border, where it continues as the B402 or European route E233.

The nearest airport is Groningen Airport Eelde at a distance of 50 kilometers.

Furthermore, there are inland shipping connections via Nieuw-Amsterdam to Coevorden, Hoogeveen and Almelo.

== Notable people ==
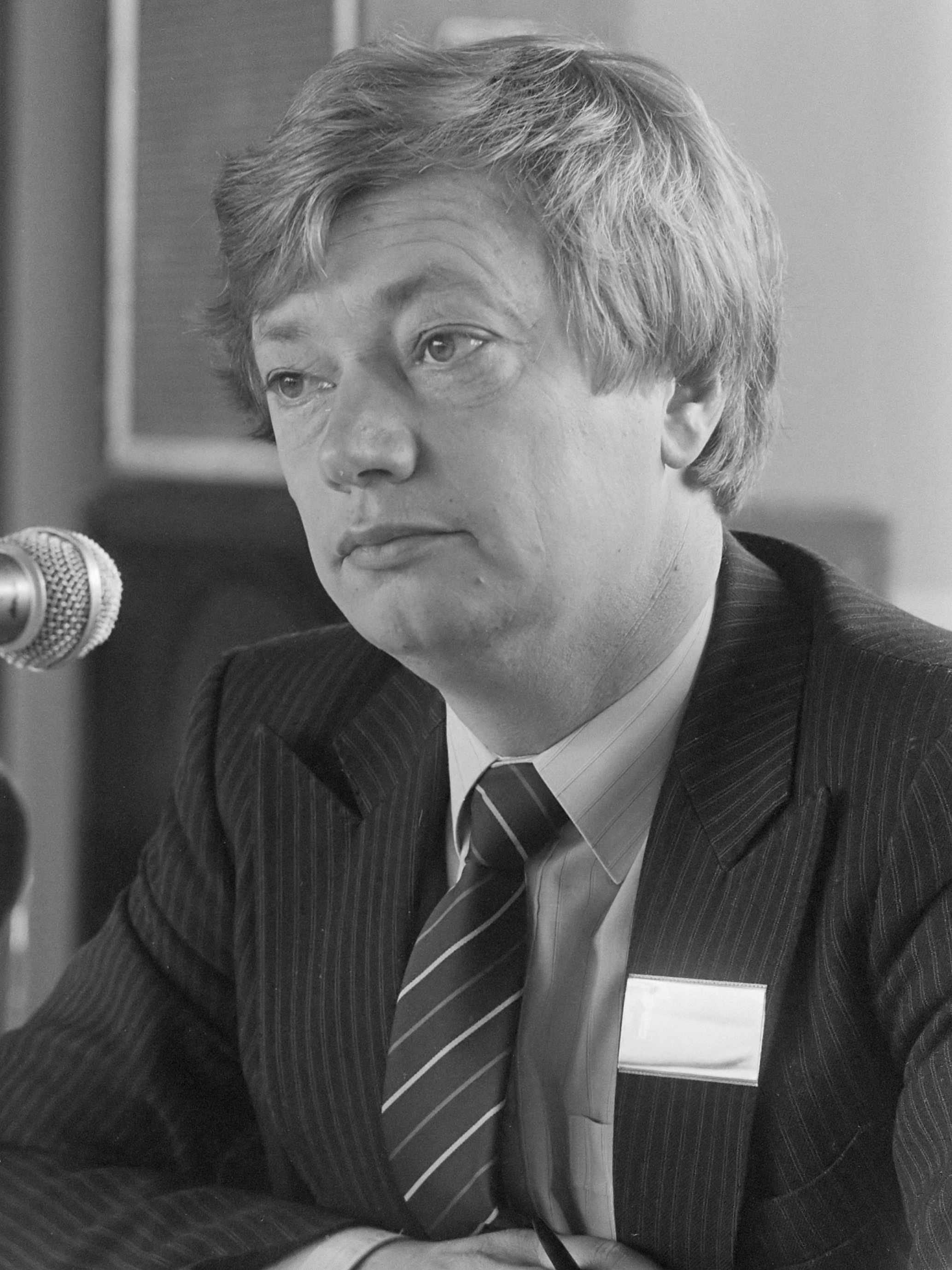
Jaap Doek, 1984

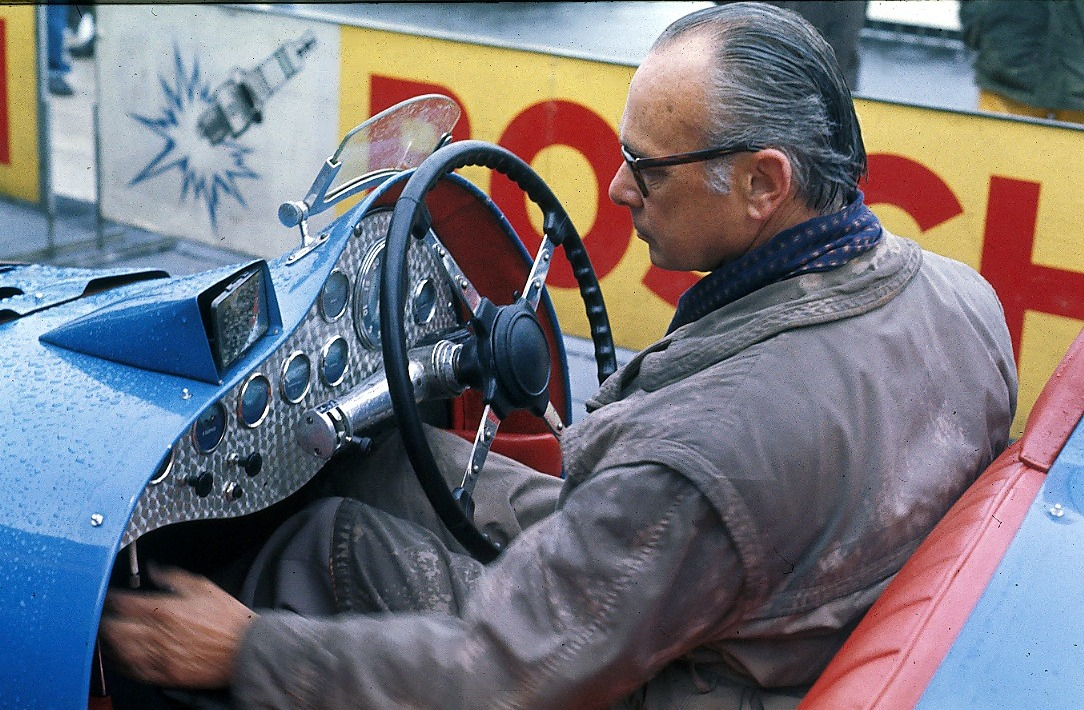
Dries van der Lof, 1977

- Jaap Doek (born 1942), jurist specializing in family and juvenile law; chairperson of the UN Committee on the Rights of the Child 2001 to 2007
- Hanja Maij-Weggen (born 1943), retired politician
- Ben Feringa (born 1951), synthetic organic chemist specializing in molecular nanotechnology and homogenous catalysis
- Jans Aasman (born 1958), psychologist and Cognitive Science expert
- Maruschka Detmers (born 1962), actress
- Frank Westerman (born 1964), writer and former journalist
- Anne Vanschothorst (born 1974), harpist and composer

=== Sport ===
- Dries van der Lof (1919–1990), racing driver
- Jan de Jonge (born 1963), retired football striker, 410 caps
- Erik Regtop (born 1968), retired footballer, 387 caps
- Gerald Sibon (born 1974), retired footballer, 437 caps
