= Jans (surname) =

Jans is a Dutch patronymic surname equivalent to Johnson. Like, Janse, this form of the surname is a less common than the abundant Jansen, Janssen and Janssens. People with the name Jans include:

- Alaric Jans (born 1949), American film and theater composer
- Anneke Jans (1509–1539), Dutch anabaptist executed for heresy
- Beat Jans (born 1964), Swiss politician
- Carlijn Jans (born 1987), Dutch volleyball player
- Chris Jans (born 1969), American basketball coach
- Edouard de Jans (1855–1919), Belgian portrait and genre painter
- Edward Jans (born 1946), Canadian sports shooter
- Jan Jans (born 1954), Dutch theologian
- Klaudia Jans-Ignacik (born 1984), Polish tennis player
- Laurent Jans (born 1992), Luxembourgish footballer
- Lies Jans (born 1974), Belgian politician
- Lucretia Jans (1602 – after 1641), Dutch survivor of the Batavia shipwreck
- Melanie Jans (born 1973), Canadian squash player
- Mie Jans (born 1994), Danish footballer
- Paul Jans (born 1981), Dutch footballer
- Petrus Josephus Jans (1909–1994), Dutch Old Catholic bishop
- Ron Jans (born 1958), Dutch football player and manager
- Roy Jans (born 1990), Belgian road cyclist
- Steve Jans (born 1988), Luxembourgish racing driver
- Tom Jans (1948–1984), American folk musician
- Wendy Jans (born 1983), Belgian snooker and pool player

== Given name ==
Jans can also be a male or female given name:

- Jans Aasman (born 1958), Dutch psychologist and Cognitive Science expert
- Jans der Enikel (fl. 1271–1302), Viennese poet and historian
- Jans Koerts (born 1969), Dutch male road bicycle racer
- Jans Koster (born 1938), Dutch female freestyle swimmer
- Jans Martense Schenck (1631–1687), Dutch settler in New Netherland
- Jans Rautenbach (1936–2016), South African screenwriter, film producer and director

== Other ==
- Neeltje Jans, local name for the goddess Nehalennia, after whom an artificial island in Zeeland has been named

== See also ==
- Geertgen tot Sint Jans (c.1460 – <1495), Dutch Renaissance painter
