= Emmermeer =

- Neighbourhood
- Location in province of Drenthe in the Netherlands Emmermeer (Netherlands)
- Coordinates: 52°47′N 6°53′E
- Country: Netherlands
- Province: Drenthe
- Municipality: Emmen

Area
  - Total: 1.71 km^{2} (0.66 sq mi)
- Elevation: 22 m (72 ft)

Population (2021)
  - Total: 6,000
  - Density: 3,500/km^{2} (9,100/sq mi)
- Time zone: UTC+1 (CET)
  - Summer (DST): UTC+2 (CEST)
- Postal code: 7815
- Dialing code: 0591

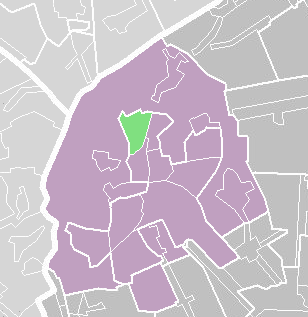
Emmermeer, a residential area in the town of Emmen.

Emmermeer is a neighbourhood of the city of Emmen in Drenthe, the Netherlands. It was a former lake near Emmen.
