= Jaap Doek =

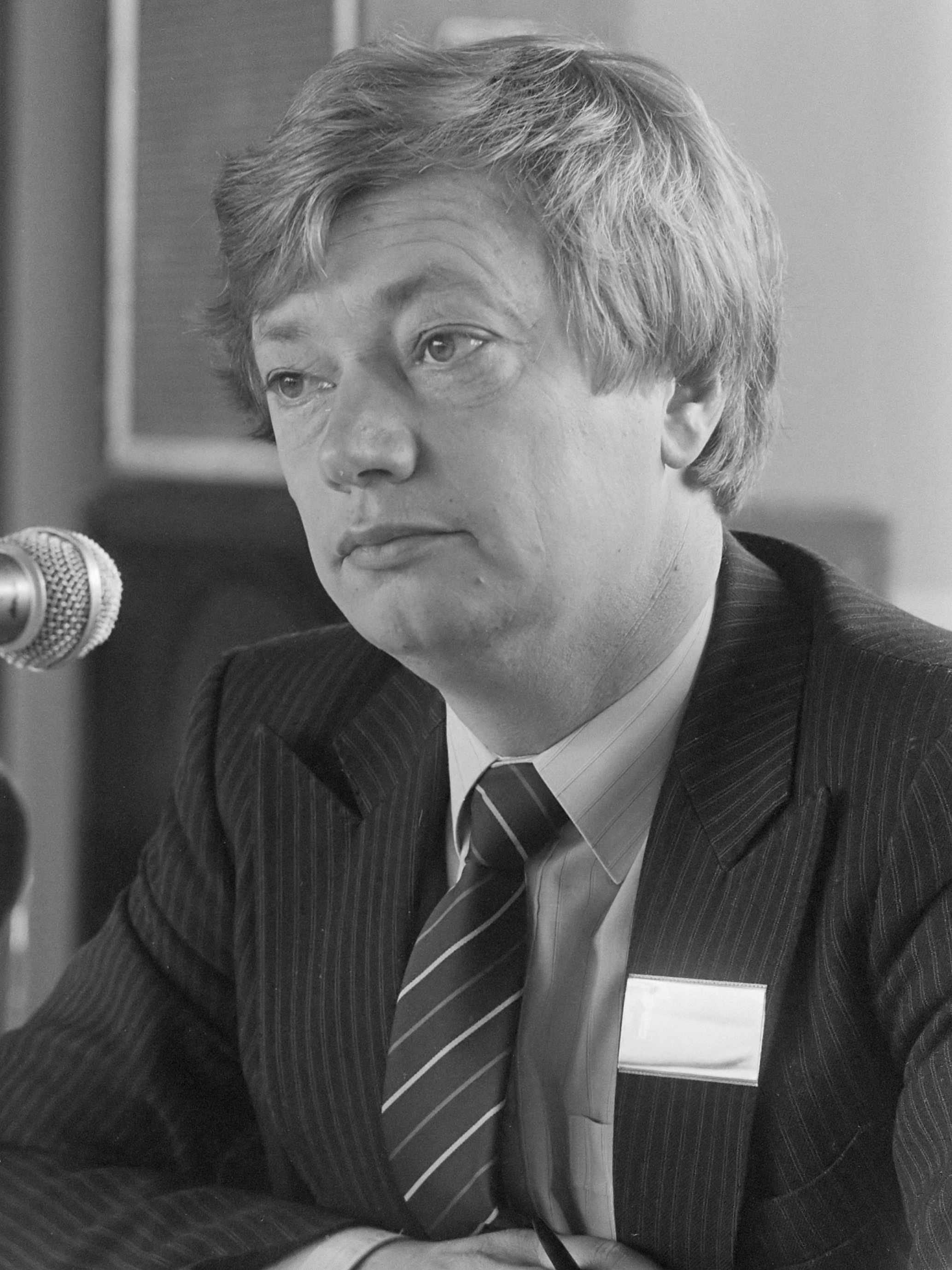
- Jaap Doek (1984)
- Born: May 1, 1942 (age 83); Emmen, Netherlands
- Occupation: Lawyer
- Known for: professor; international committee work

Jaap Egbert Doek (born May 1, 1942, in Emmen) is a Dutch jurist, specialising in family and juvenile law. He is a professor of law at the Vrije Universiteit in Amsterdam, where he was the dean of the law faculty from 1988 to 1992. He is a deputy justice in the Court of Appeal of Amsterdam and he was a juvenile court judge in the district court of Alkmaar and the Hague (1978–1985).

== International work ==
He was elected to the United Nations Committee on the Rights of the Child in February 1999 and, from May 2001 to the end of his mandate in February 2007, served as its Chairperson.

Doek was a founding member of the International Society for the Prevention of Child Abuse and Neglect (ISPCAN) (serving as president in 1982–1984 and as vice president for developing countries in 1984–1992) and in that capacity was involved in the establishment of the African Network for Prevention and Protection of Child Abuse and Neglect (ANPPCAN). He was involved in the creation of Defence for Children International (DCI) in 1979 and the Dutch section of this organisation (1984). He was a member of the ISPCAN/DCI working group which conducted a large study on child labour (1994–1997).

He was a member of the Board of the International Association of Juvenile and Family Court Magistrates from 1982 to 1986. In 1999–2000 he was the president of the European Law Faculties Association (ELFA).

== Visiting professor ==
In 1993 he was a visiting scholar at Georgetown University Law Center in Washington, D.C., and at the University of Michigan Law School in Ann Arbor. In January to May 1999 he was a visiting professor at the Northwestern University School of Law in Chicago.

== Literary career ==
He has published numerous books and articles on various topics in the area of children's rights and family law in national and international journals.

== Sources ==
- http://www.jaapedoek.nl/biography.html Information presented on this website may be distributed or copied (unless otherwise noted). Use of appropriate byline/photo/image credit is requested.
