= Nieuw-Weerdinge =

- Village
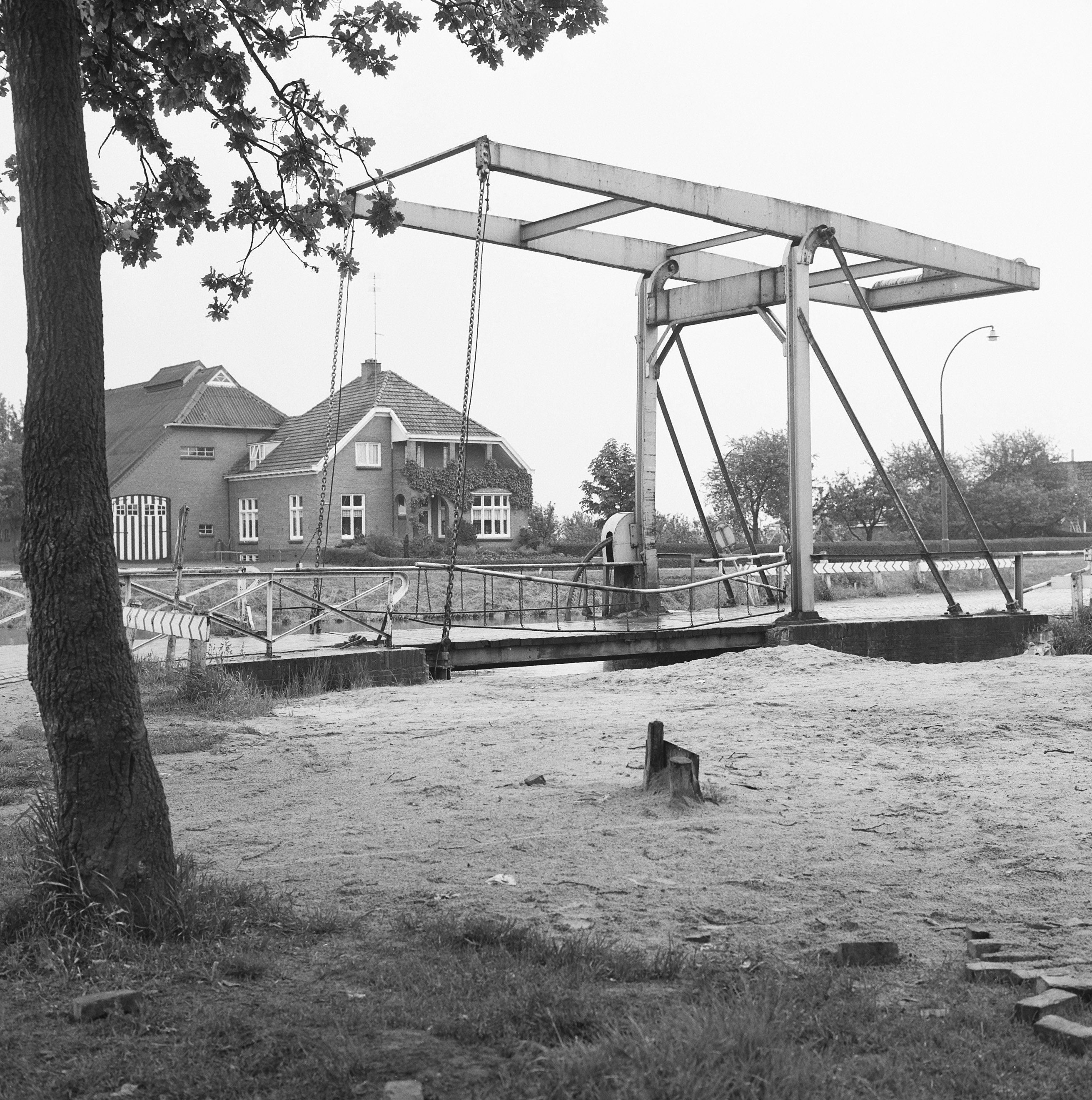
- Bridge in Nieuw-Weerdinge

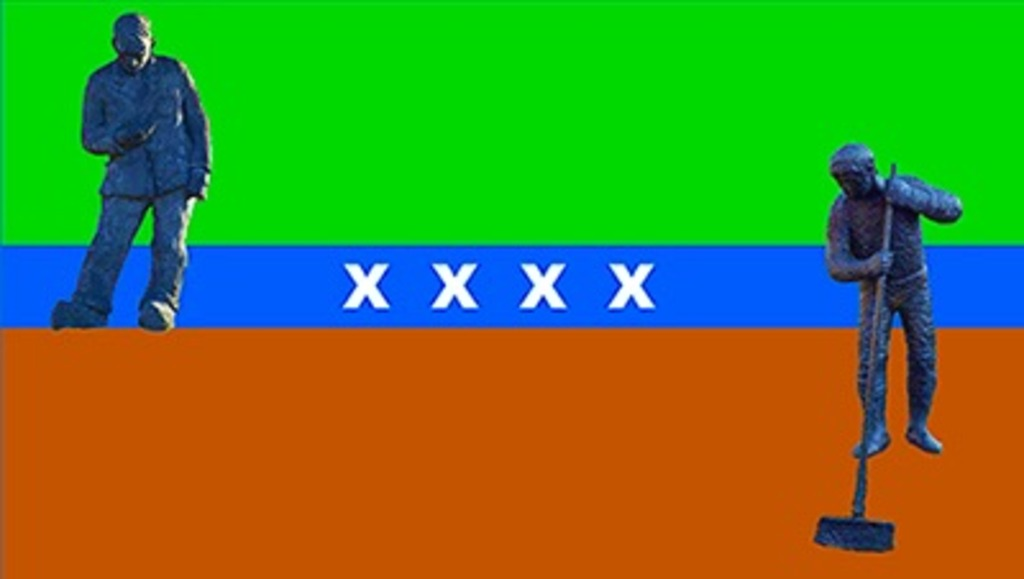
- Flag

- Location in province of Drenthe in the Netherlands Nieuw-Weerdinge (Netherlands)
- Coordinates: 52.8555°N 6.9866°E
- Country: Netherlands
- Province: Drenthe
- Municipality: Emmen
- Established: 1872

Area
  - Total: 24.79 km^{2} (9.57 sq mi)
- Elevation: 12 m (39 ft)

Population (2021)
  - Total: 3,420
  - Density: 138/km^{2} (357/sq mi)
- Postal code: 7831
- Dialing code: 0591

Nieuw-Weerdinge is a village in the Netherlands and is part of the Emmen municipality in Drenthe.

The climate is coastal. The average temperature is 9 °C. The warmest month is July, at 18 °C, and the coldest is January, at −2 °C.

== History ==
Nieuw-Weerdinge started as a peat exploitation settlement. It was founded in 1872, and was originally called Weerdingermarke. In 1902, it was renamed Nieuw-Weerdinge. In 1932, it was home to 4,466 people.
