= Wildlands (zoo) =

Wildlands Adventure Zoo Emmen
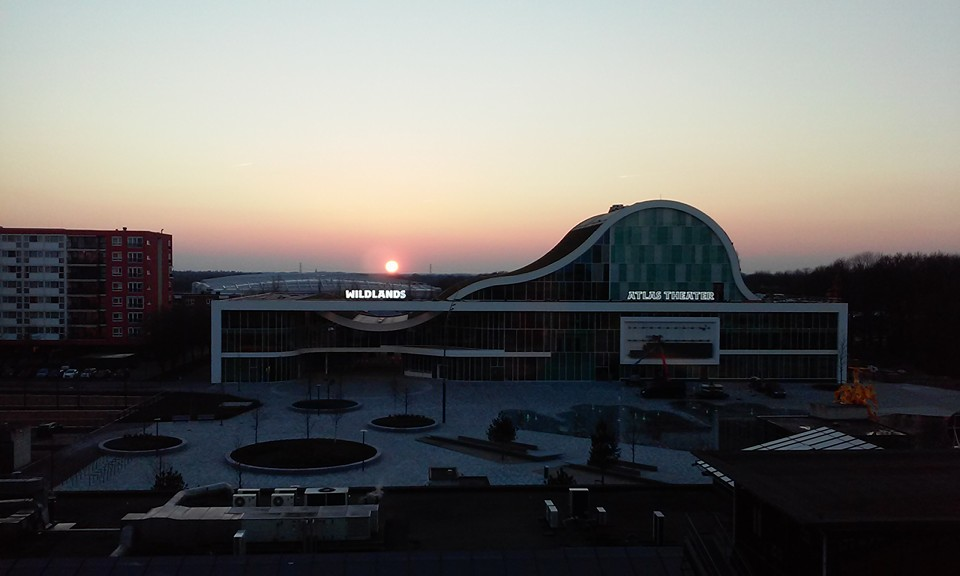
- Entrance during twilight
- Interactive map of Wildlands Adventure Zoo Emmen
- 52.7819°N 6.8889°E
- Date opened: 25 March 2016
- Location: Emmen, the Netherlands
- Land area: 22 hectares (54 acres)
- No. of animals: 7,000
- Annual visitors: 1.3 million (2016)
- Memberships: EAZA, NVD
- Website: Official website

Wildlands, also known as Wildlands Adventure Zoo Emmen, is a zoo in Emmen, the Netherlands. It opened in March 2016, replacing the Emmen Zoo. It was built at a cost of 200 million euros. Upon its reorganisation the zoo increased in size and animal exhibit space but reduced its collection from 300 to about 100 species.

Wildlands is a zoo with four main areas: Jungola, Serenga, Nortica and Animazia.

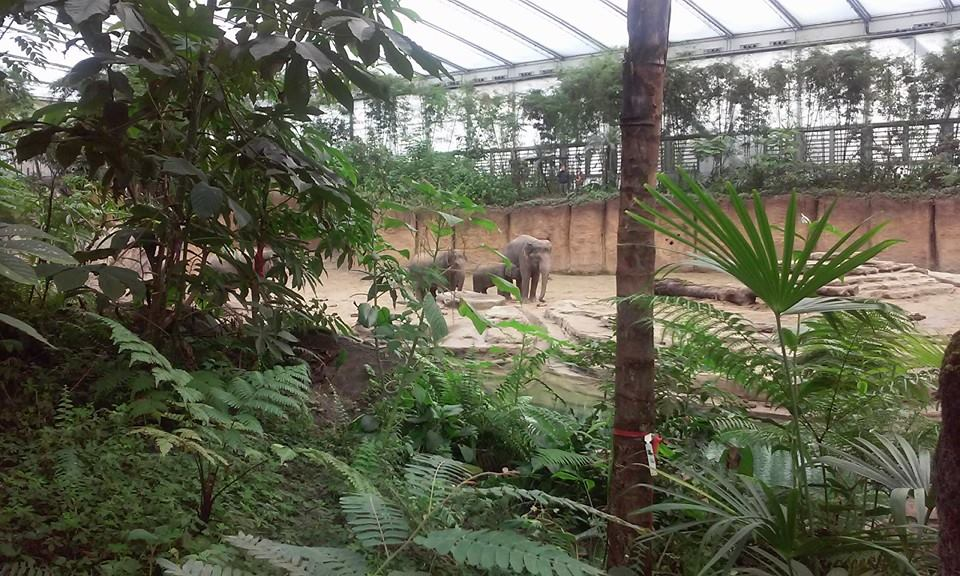
The jungle house Rimbula, which also houses the indoor section of the elephant exhibit

Jungola is jungle-themed and displays butterflies, tropical birds, large reptiles (such as Chinese alligators and pythons), ring-tailed lemurs, lar gibbons, small-clawed otters and Asian elephants. The most prominent feature of Jungola is the indoor tropical rainforest hall Rimbula, which at 18,000 m^{2} (190,000 ft^{2}) is the largest zoo jungle hall in the world and the largest greenhouse in Europe. Serenga is the African savanna section and is home to species such as lion, Grant's zebras, Rothschild's giraffes, white rhinoceros and hamadryas baboons, but also Australian red-necked wallabies. Nortica is aimed at cold oceans and is home to polar bear, Californian sea lion, South American fur seal and Humboldt penguin. The final main section, Animazia, is a large indoor playground, but also home to an aquarium with species such as corals, green sea turtles and tropical fish.

== List of attractions ==
Name	Manufacturer	Model	Opened	Status	Area	Other statistics
Arctic 1	Brogent Technologies	4D Simulator Ride	2016	Operating	Nortica	Duration (pre show): 3:00 minutes; Duration (ride): 4:30 minutes
Rimbula River	Mack Rides	Boat Ride	2016	Operating	Jungola	Duration: 9:00 minutes; Length: 984.25 ft (300.00 m); Speed: 1.24 mph (2.00 km/h)
Serenga Safari	Severn Lamb	Truck Ride	2016	Operating	Serenga	Duration: 7:00 minutes; Length: 1,788 ft (545 m)
Terra Explorer	Unknown	Unknown	2016	Operating	Nortica	Unknown
Tweestryd	Vekoma	Junior Boomerang Coaster	2018	Operating	Serenga	Duration: 1:05 minutes; Length: 715.2 ft (218.0 m); Height: 65.6 ft (20.0 m); Speed: 37.3 mph (60.0 km/h)

== List of animals ==
Wildlands Adventure Zoo Emmen has at least 80 types of animals, as of 2018.

Name	Area
African lion	Serenga
African spurred tortoise	Animazia
Agouti	Jungola
Anglo-Nubian goat	Serenga
Asian elephant	Jungola
Asian small-clawed otter	Jungola
Atlas moth	Jungola
Axolotl	Animazia
Bactrian camel	Serenga
Bali myna	Jungola
Ball python	Jungola
Black-capped squirrel monkey	Jungola
Black-headed spider monkey	Jungola
Black pond turtle	Jungola
Black rat	Nortica
Black-tailed prairie dog	Serenga
Blue wildebeest	Serenga
Butterflies	Jungola
California sea lion	Nortica
Cameroon sheep	Serenga
Chinese alligator	Jungola
Coconut lorikeet	Jungola
Common dwarf mongoose	Serenga
Common ostrich	Serenga
Common rain frog	Jungola
Crested partridge	Jungola
Dwarf crocodile	Jungola
Emerald tree monitor	Jungola
Euploea	Jungola
Forest hinge-back tortoise	Jungola
Greater rhea	Serenga
Giant African millipede	Jungola
Giant African snail	Jungola
Grant's zebra	Serenga
Great grey owl	Nortica
Green sea turtle	Animazia
Hamadryas baboon	Serenga
Heliconia	Jungola
Helmeted guineafowl	Serenga
Hippopotamus	Serenga
Humboldt penguin	Nortica
Impala	Serenga
Java sparrow	Jungola
Kissing gourami	Jungola
Lar gibbon	Jungola
Leafcutter ant	Jungola
Long-tailed glossy starling	Jungola
Luzon bleeding-heart	Jungola
Madagascar day gecko	Jungola
Madagascar hissing cockroach	Jungola
Maylandia	Animazia
Meerkat	Serenga
Miniature donkey	Serenga
Miniature Zebu	Serenga
Menelaus blue morpho	Jungola
Mexican redknee tarantula	Jungola
Naked mole-rat	Animazia
Ocellaris clownfish	Animazia
Onager	Serenga
Owl butterfly	Jungola
Pipefish	Animazia
Poison dart frog	Jungola
Polar bear	Nortica
Red-bellied piranha	Animazia
Red lionfish	Animazia
Reticulated python	Jungola
Ring-tailed lemur	Jungola
Rodrigues flying fox	Jungola
Rothschild's giraffe	Serenga
Sea urchin	Animazia
Seven-spot archerfish	Jungola
Siberian tiger	Jungola
Snowy-crowned robin-chat	Jungola
Snowy owl	Nortica
South American fur seal	Nortica
Starfish	Animazia
Superb starling	Jungola
Swamp wallaby	Serenga
Turaco	Jungola
Victoria crowned pigeon	Jungola
Village weaver	Serenga
Waterbuck	Serenga
White rhinoceros	Serenga
