= Delftlanden =

- Neighbourhood
- Location in province of Drenthe in the Netherlands Delftlanden (Netherlands)
- Coordinates: 52.7561°N 6.8675°E
- Country: Netherlands
- Province: Drenthe
- Municipality: Emmen

Area
  - Total: 2.32 km^{2} (0.90 sq mi)
- Elevation: 16 m (52 ft)

Population (2021)
  - Total: 1,375
  - Density: 593/km^{2} (1,540/sq mi)
- Time zone: UTC+1 (CET)
  - Summer (DST): UTC+2 (CEST)
- Postal code: 7813
- Dialing code: 0519

Delftlanden is a neighbourhood in the city Emmen in Drenthe, the Netherlands.
