= The Schizo's =

- Origin: Emmen, Netherlands
- Genres: Punk rock
- Years active: 1985–1988, 2008-present
- Labels: none, own label
- Members: Reinie Hummel, Marco Geerdink
- Past members: Despo Kristel, René Timmer

The Schizo's are a Dutch punkrock band from Emmen. The band was formed in the mid-1980s, broke up, and reformed in the 2000s.

== History ==
The band was formed around 1985 in Emmen; the members (Despo Kristel on bass, René Timmer, and Reinie Hummel) were all heavily influenced by the American rock-and-roll and especially the New York City punk rock scene with bands like The Ramones, Johnny Thunders and New York Dolls. In spring of 1987 they each took out a personal loan and raised 20,000 Dutch guilders (about € 9100,-) and booked a week in the Ballad Sound recording studio near the town of Gorinchem. To keep costs down they lived in a trailer on the local campground and relied on volunteers to help them out. In a single week they recorded 11 tracks, and did the final mix at Jaap Brünner's studio to make a final mix.

Since no record label showed any interest, they self-released 500 copies of the album. Lack of success and problems with alcohol and hard drugs, however, led to the band's downfall.

== Comeback ==
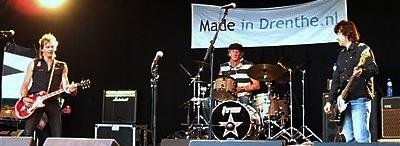
Comeback gig; August 2008 in Emmen

In 2008, Hummel and Timmer, now clean, reformed the band, getting Marco Geerdink to replace Kristel on bass. They played their first gig in over 20 years during the 2008 Gouden Pijl, a professional Criterium in Emmen.

They recorded a second CD, Overcome Oblivion and played several gigs in Emmen and surroundings. On 4 August 2011, Rene Timmer died after a long illness.

== Discography ==
=== Albums ===
- 1987: Bad Image
- 2009: Overcome Oblivion

=== Album Bad Image ===
Tracks on the Bad Image album
Side track	Title	writer:	durarion:
A - 1	My pretty girl	The Schizo's	3:31
A - 2	I'am a Schizo	The Schizo's	3:46
A - 3	You gotta go	The Schizo's	2:59
A - 4	Wild and Crazy	The Schizo's (lyrics), Jan G. en Karel R. (music)	3:41
A - 5	Mr. Supercool	The Schizo's	2:13
B - 1	You're my taste	The Schizo's	2:06
B - 2	Final O.D.	The Schizo's	2:20
B - 3	Bad Image	The Schizo's	2:05
B - 4	Chinese Rocks	Johnny Thunders, Jerry Nolan, Dee Dee Ramone, Richard Hell	2:06
B - 5	Punkrocker	Annemarie(lyrics), The Schizo's (music)	2:28
B - 6	Milk Cow Blues	Ester, 1958	2:18
