= Van Vuuren =

Van Vuuren, (Lit, translation: "from Vuren"), is an Afrikaans surname of Dutch (Germanic) origin. The surname originated from the village ‘Vuren’ in the Netherlands. The surname means beacon or source of light, such as a lighthouse.

Many of the modern related surnames can be traced back to Britain, Ireland and the Netherlands.

Similar surnames: Van Vuren, Van Buren, Van Vooren, Van Curen, Van Keuren, Van Duren

Notable people with the surname include:

- Christiaan Van Vuuren (born 1982), Australian blogger
- Dave van Vuuren (born 1990), South African singer
- Jaco Janse van Vuuren, South African paralympic athlete
- Jurie van Vuuren (born 1993), South African rugby union player for the Tel Aviv Heat
- Michael van Vuuren (born 1991), South African rugby union player
- Rob van Vuuren (born 1976), South African actor, comedian, and presenter
- Rudie van Vuuren (born 1972), Namibian cricketer, physician and conservationist
- Steve van Vuuren (born 1959), South African golfer
- Wian van Vuuren (born 1993), Namibian cricketer
- Wickus van Vuuren (born 1989), South African cricketer

== See also ==
- Janse van Vuuren
