= Angelslo =

- Neighbourhood
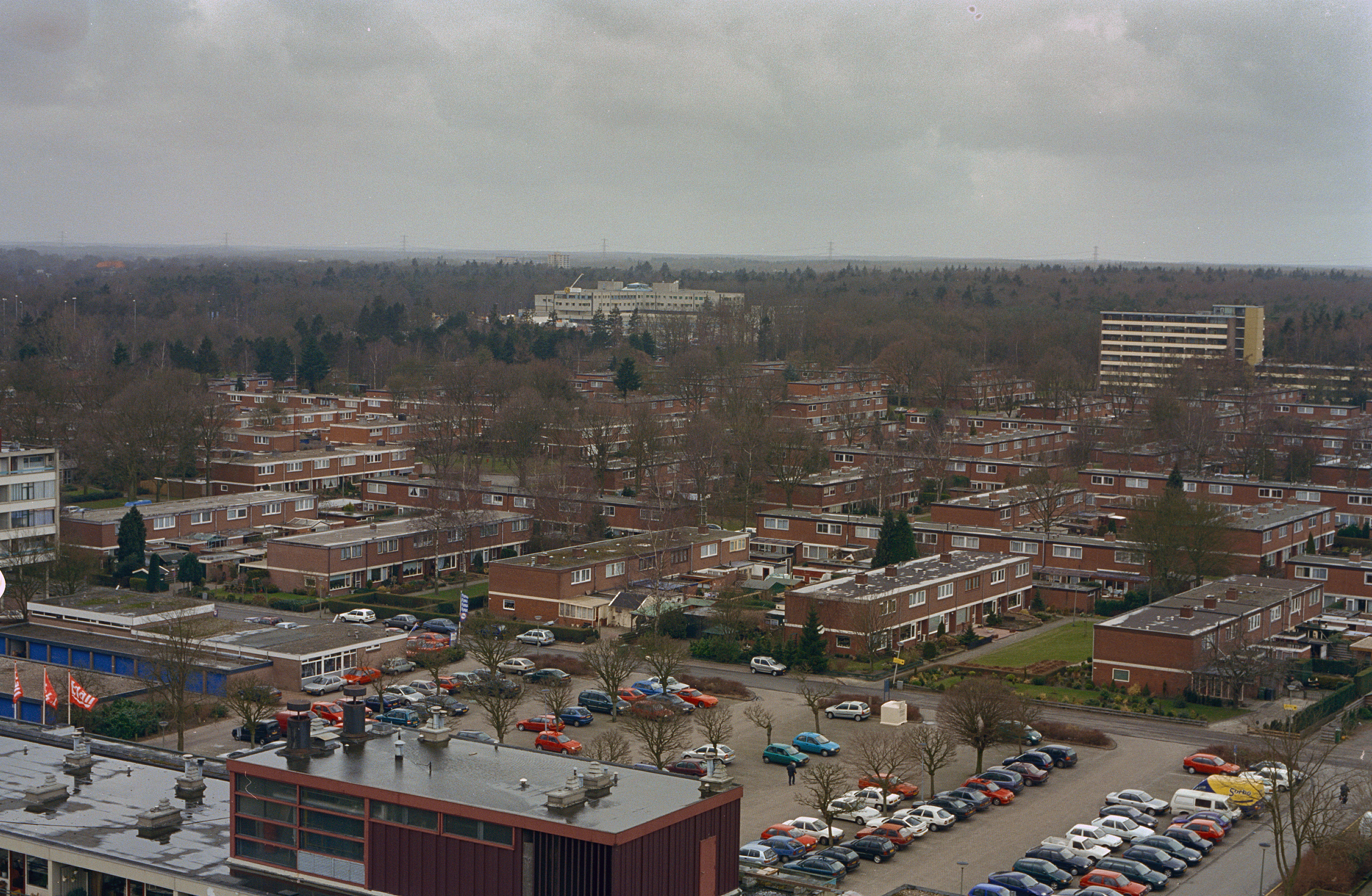
- View on the neighbourhood

- Location in province of Drenthe in the Netherlands Angelslo (Netherlands)
- Coordinates: 52.71239°N 6.39894°E
- Country: Netherlands
- Province: Drenthe
- Municipality: Emmen

Area
  - Total: 13.94 km^{2} (5.38 sq mi)
- Elevation: 5 m (16 ft)

Population (2021)
  - Total: 7,645
  - Density: 548.4/km^{2} (1,420/sq mi)
- Time zone: UTC+1 (CET)
  - Summer (DST): UTC+2 (CEST)
- Postal code: 7924
- Dialing code: 0591

Angelslo is a neighbourhood of the city Emmen in Drenthe, the Netherlands. It is a former village which was annexed by Emmen.

== History ==
It was first mentioned in 1325 as Angel. The etymology is unknown. In 1932, it was home to 258 people.

The construction of the neighbourhood started in the 1960s. Typical for these buildings are the flat roofs.
Angelslo has two elementary schools: Twiespan and O.B.S. Angelslo. Besides that, Angelslo also has a shopping mall, located at the Statenweg.
Statenweg is the main road that goes through Angelslo and branches off in smaller roads (Landschapslaan, Dingspellaan, Kerspellaan, Boerschapslaan, Holtlaan and Veldlaan), that in their turn branch off again.
There are two churches in Angelslo: Evangelische Gemeente Emmen and Baptisten Gemeente Het Baken. The mosque is located near the shopping mall and is called ISN Yildirim Beyazit Moskee.
Angelslo also has a swimmingpool, Aquarena, which is the only indoor pool of Emmen.
The hospital of Emmen is located on the border of Angelslo.
