= Dierenpark Emmen =

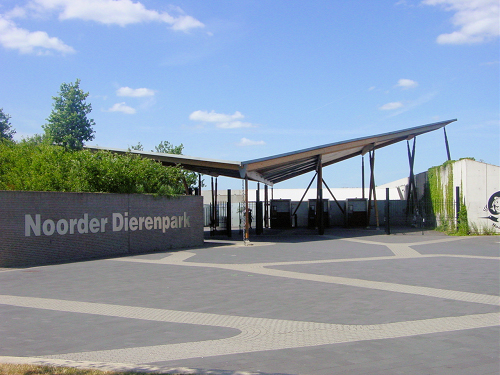
- Entrance
- Interactive map of Dierenpark Emmen
- 52°46′55″N 6°53′20″E
- Date opened: 16 May 1935
- Date closed: 31 December 2015
- Location: Emmen, Netherlands
- Annual visitors: 672.000 (2013)
- Memberships: EAZA, NVD
- Website: dierenpark-emmen.nl

Dierenpark Emmen (also known as Noorder Dierenpark) was a large zoo located in Emmen in the northern province of Drenthe in the Netherlands. Due to financial difficulties the zoo decided in 2011 to reorganise. It closed at the end of 2015, but reopened early 2016 on another location as Wildlands Adventure Zoo Emmen. But the original was reopened in June 2016 by Park founder Aleid Rensen as a city park and renamed to Rensenpark

== History ==
Dierenpark Emmen was first founded in 1935 by Willemm Osting as a privately run zoo in the downtown sector of Emmen. The zoo business was initially a success, but gradually slowed down as World War II approached. By the 1960s, the zoo's features were in aging condition, and attendance dropped as a result. In 1970, Alied Resting-Oosting, Willemm's daughter, took management and initiated renovation projects. Under new ownership, animal exhibits were reorganized zoogeographically, and a "living museum" concept was introduced to the zoo with interactive museum displays and a botanical garden. Dierenpark Emmen was considered to be one of the finest zoos in Europe and has won various prizes. Animals lived in carefully reconstructed natural habitats according to vegetation, climate, and elevation. Because of lack of space, a new, second site was opened in 1998 just outside Emmen. The two parts of the zoo were connected with each other and one ticket gave admission to both parts.

== Zoo Features ==
=== Biochron ===
Located near the entrance was the zoo's museum of evolution, the Biochron, with its name being derived from the Greek words "bios" (meaning life) and "chron" (meaning time). Displays in this museum included animatronic dinosaurs, fossilized animals, a tree shrew habitat, and a butterfly pavilion.

=== African Savanna ===
Standing at 3 acres, the exhibit was home to the zoo's white rhinoceroses, giraffes, antelope, ostriches, and zebras.

== Conservation and breeding ==
The zoo has had great success breeding Asian elephants, with 26 births since 1992 and four births in 2010 and 2011 alone. In 2011 there were 13 elephants at the zoo, others having been transported to other zoos. The elephant accommodations comprise a large moated island for females and calves, and a separate smaller island for the bull, with indoor housing being underground.

== Wildlands, adventure zoo Emmen ==
The city council of Emmen approved the construction of a completely new zoo, the Wildlands, which is expected to draw 1.3 million visitors annually. The new zoo was completed in March 2016 and is part of a plan for revitalizing the city center of Emmen. Visitors are able to walk from the new City plaza to the new zoo, which initially is about 22 hectares (54 acres) with an additional 26 hectares (64 acres) for expansion, and includes about 40,000 square metres (430,000 sq ft) of interior space, including a theater.

== 2012 Dutch time trial championships ==
The 2012 Dutch National Time Trial Championships for professionals and elite women's started in the zoo beside the African savanna. It was the first time in history a cycle race started in a zoo. Riders rode along the zebras, giraffes, rhinos and hippos.
