= Northlink College =

College in South Africa

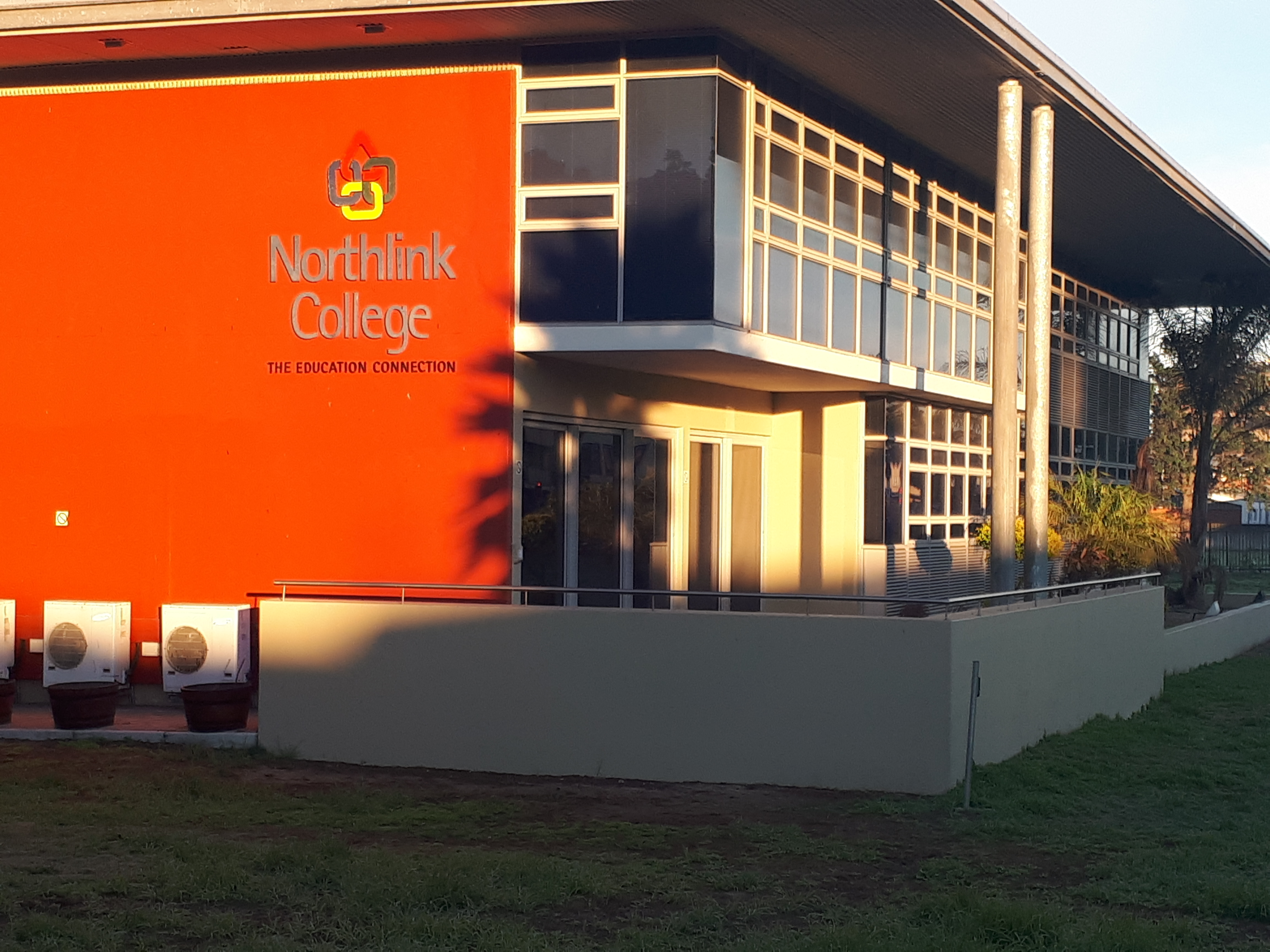
- Type: Public college
- Established: 2002
- Chancellor: L Beech
- Location: Bellville, Western Cape, South Africa; 33.9020°S 18.6383°E
- Website: https://www.northlink.co.za/

Northlink College is a Government higher education institution situated in Bellville, Western Cape, South Africa. It is fully accredited by the Council on Higher Education and Department of Higher Education and Training (DoHET)(South Africa). The College is quality assured by the South African Council on Higher Education (CHE).

== History ==
It was founded in 2002, after a South African Government decision to merge four colleges Wingfield Technical College, Tygerberg College, Bellville Technical College and Belhar College

== Name ==
It's called Northlink due to it being situated in the Northern Suburbs of Cape Town, and through its campuses links them together.

== Campuses ==
Apart from the main campus on Voortrekker Road in Bellville it has campuses in Belhar, Goodwood, Parow, Protea, Tygerberg and Wingfield

== Courses ==
Northlink College offers undergraduate tertiary qualifications. The college is also involved in partnership with organizations

== Student numbers ==
2015 numbers exceed 10 000.

== Principal ==
Leon Beeck is heading the college.

== Alumni ==
- Theodore Jantjies, actor
