= Janse van Vuuren =

Janse van Vuuren is a South African surname. Notable people sharing this surname include:

- Jaco Janse van Vuuren, is a South Africa paralympic athlete
- Laura Janse van Vuuren, is a South African Navy officer and the second woman to reach flag rank
- Marco Jansen van Vuren (born 1996), South African rugby union player
- Pieter Jansen van Vuren (born 1991), South African rugby union player

== See also ==
- Van Vuuren
- Janse
