= Theodore Jantjies =

South African actor (born 1983)

- Born: Theodore Graham Peter Jantjies; 8 April 1983 (age 43); Heidelberg, Western Cape
- Education: Northlink College
- Occupation: Actor
- Years active: 2005–present

Theodore Jantjies is a South African actor best known for his starring role as Xander Meintjies in the SABC2 soap opera 7^{de} Laan.

== Biography ==
=== Early life ===
Theodore was born in Heidelberg in the Western Cape. In 2002 he matriculated from Kairos Secondary School and went on to study theatre at Northlink College in Cape Town. In 2004 he completed his diploma in Performing Arts.

He started his professional career in theatre in 2005, as one of the leading characters in Die Keiser, to critical acclaim and was nominated for an award for his portrayal. After that followed Kanna hy ko Huistoe at the Baxter Theatre in Cape Town and many others.

=== Career ===
He made his television debut in the e.tv sitcom Madam and Eve, which was followed by the e.tv primetime soap, Scandal!. He then starred in the Henry Mylne production of Die Swerfjare van Poppie Nongena, opposite veteran actress Vinette Ebrahim. The production was hailed as one of the top productions at Arts festivals, KKNK and the Suidooster fees.

Since 2008, he was working on the SABC2 soap 7^{de} Laan, in which he plays the role of Xander Meintjies. In 2020 he left the show.

== Filmography ==
- 7^{de} Laan as Xander Meintjies
