= Jans Aasman =

Dutch psychologist

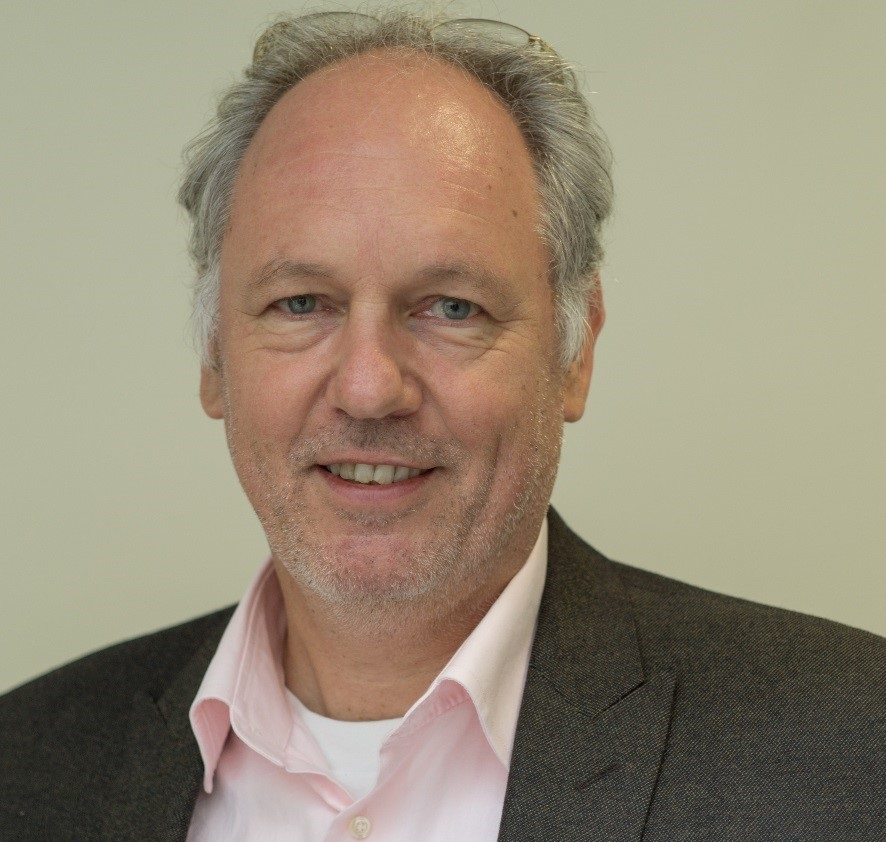
- Born: 29 July 1958 (age 67); Emmen
- Education: University of Groningen
- Occupations: Psychologist and cognitive science expert
- Organization: Franz Inc. (CEO)

Jannes "Jans" Aasman (born 1958) is a Dutch psychologist and cognitive science expert. He is also the chief executive officer of Franz Inc, an early innovator in Artificial Intelligence and provider of Semantic Graph Databases and Analytics. He is a frequent speaker within the Database and Semantic Technology industries and has authored multiple research papers and bylines on the subject.

== Study and career ==
Aasman studied experimental and cognitive psychology at the University of Groningen. His area of study included Psychophysiology and Cognitive Psychology. Aasman spent a major part of his professional life in telecommunications research, applied Artificial Intelligence projects and intelligent user interfaces. He gathered patents in the areas of speech technology, recommendation engines, multimodal user interaction systems while developing precursor technology for the iPad and Siri from 1995 to 2004. Prior to joining Franz Inc., Aasman worked as a professor in the Industrial Design department of the Technical University of Delft and for TNO Research. He also worked as a researcher at the Traffic Research Center of the University of Groningen, visiting Scientist at the Computer Science Department of Carnegie Mellon University and as a Senior Scientist for KPN Research.
