= Titia Ex =

Dutch artist

- Born: Titia Ex; Terwinselen, Netherlands
- Known for: Conceptual art

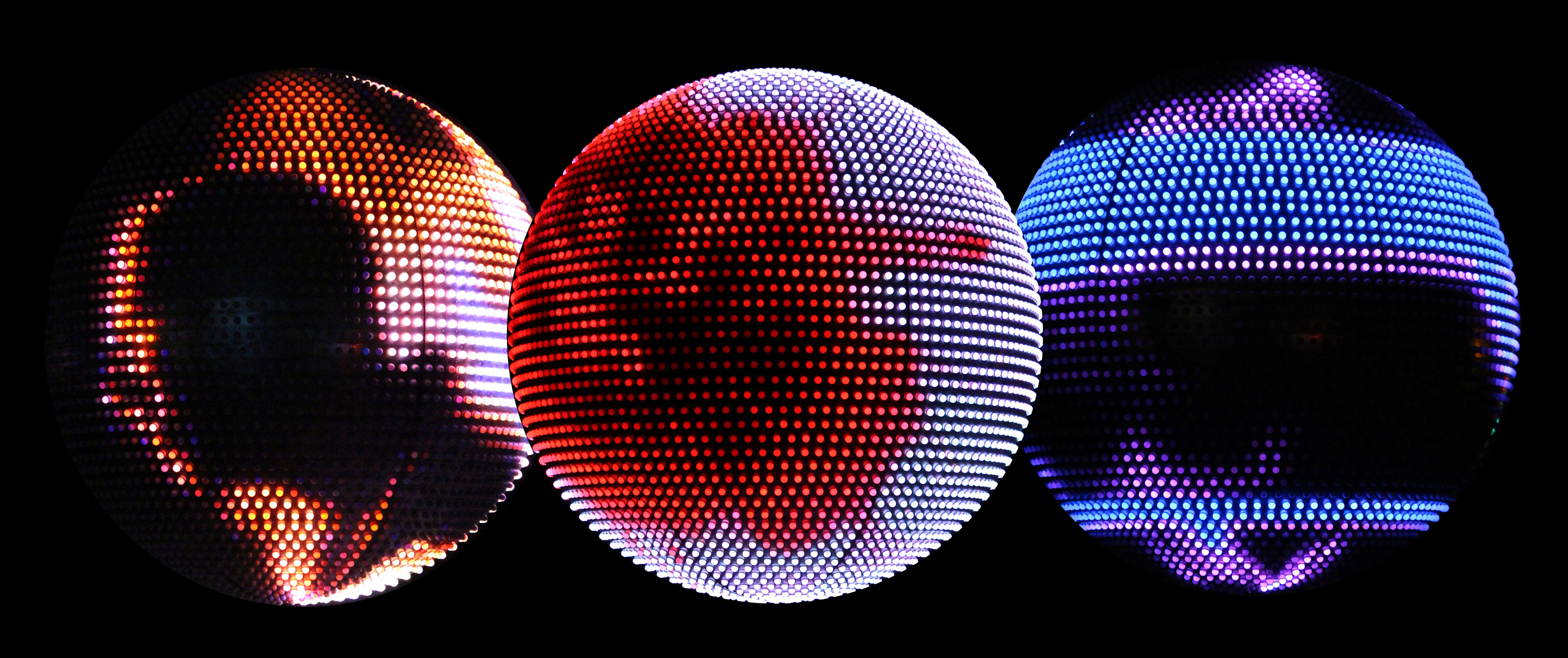
An LED display in the shape of a Globe. The work is inspired by Dante's Divine Comedy and the name of The Walk refers to Dante's travels from Hell to Purgatory and ultimately Heaven.

Titia Ex (born Terwinselen) is a Dutch conceptual artist. She lives and works in Amsterdam.

== Work ==
Ex uses light, space, and materials to create her light installations. She uses light in the widest sense possible — natural light, artificial light, plus materials that respond to light such as glass, neon, and LED — to create interactive environments.

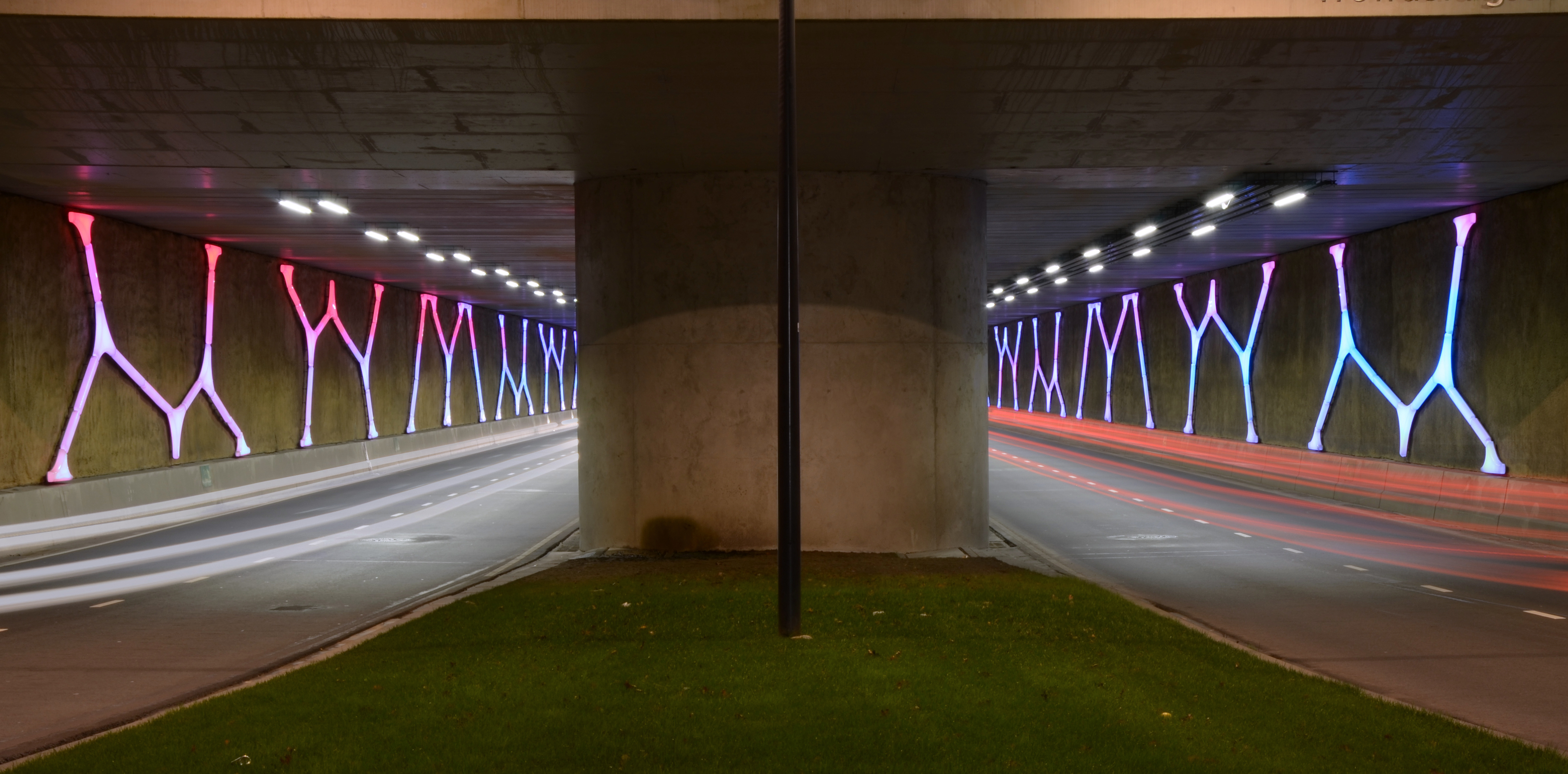
'Dolmen Light' received 2015 Lamp Lighting Solutions Award

Receiving international acclaim for her "Flower from the Universe", Ex establishes herself firmly as an LED artist Next, her "The Walk" is received well by critics and the general public wherever it is shown. "The Waiting" was selected winner in the Landscape category for the 2013 People's Choice Awards. The "Dolmen Light Tunnel" won the 2015 Lamp Lighting Solutions Award in the category Urban and Landscape Lighting. In 2026, Ex received the American Light Justice Now Award of Excellence for "Light Echo" which increased safety and accessibility in a bicycle tunnel in Amsterdam.

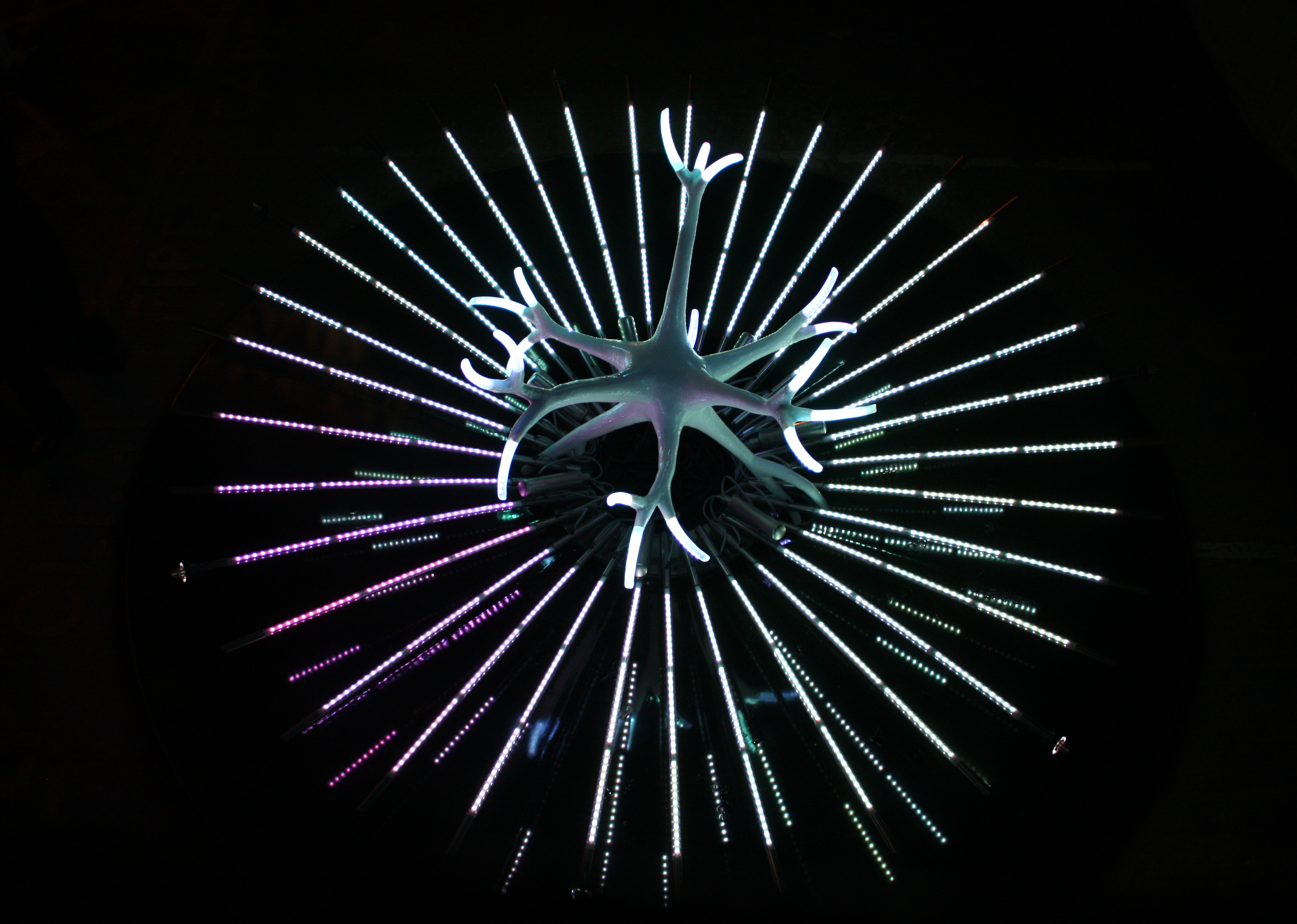
Flower from the Universe by Titia Ex, as shown in London

=== Selected works ===
- Flower from the Universe -This work established Ex as an internationally recognized artist. International broadcast station DW, Deutsche Welle English shows footage of the artwork in a televised interview with the artist broadcast in many countries of the world.
- Musical Chairs - Placed on the roof of a Kentucky Fried Chicken in Apeldoorn, Netherlands, this work embodies the creative spirit of Ex. See footage to the right.
- The Walk - An LED display in the shape of a Globe developed by Philips Color Kinetics in 2012. The work Ex created was inspired by Dante's Divine Comedy and the name of The Walk refers to Dante's travels from Hell to Purgatory and ultimately Heaven.
  Musical Chairs
  Among the places this work was shown was the Kinetica Art Fair in London and The New York Times wrote about Ex' contribution as "one of the most popular pieces."

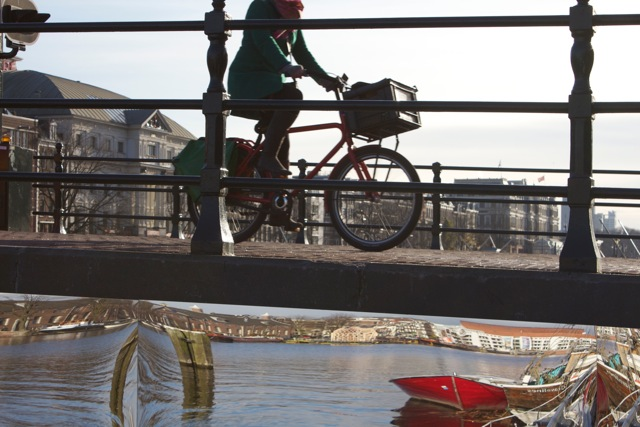
Appears@Amsterdam

- Dolmen Light Tunnel - Titia Ex receives international recognition for blending artistic and technical excellence, creating an art work that augments the traffic environment while retaining traffic safety.
- Light Echo - Titia Ex receives an additional international award using light art for increasing traffic safety and making public spaces more accessible to all.
