= Janse =

Janse is a Dutch patronymic surname. People with this name include:

- Anthonie Johannes Theodorus Janse (1877–1970), South African entomologist
- Axel Janse (1888–1973), Swedish gymnast
- Don Janse (1929–1999), American vocal director and arranger
- Jens Janse (born 1986), Dutch football player
- Joseph Janse (1909–1985), Dutch-American chiropractor
- Lilian Janse (born 1973), Dutch politician
- Mark Janse (born 1959), Dutch linguist
- Margot Janse (born 1969), Dutch chef
- Olov Janse (1892–1985), Swedish archaeologist
- Pehr Janse (1893–1961), Swedish Army major general
- Albert Janse Ryckman (1642–1737), American businessman and politician

Janse van Rensburg

- See Janse van Rensburg

Janse van Vuuren

- See Janse van Vuuren
