= List of townlands of County Offaly =

This is a sortable table of the approximately 1,194 townlands in County Offaly, Ireland.

Duplicate names occur where there is more than one townland with the same name in the county. Names marked in bold typeface are towns and villages, and the word Town appears for those entries in the Acres column.

== Townland list ==
| Townland | Acres | Barony | Civil parish | Poor law union |
|---|---|---|---|---|
| Acantha | 183 | Ballycowan | Durrow | Tullamore |
| Adruel | 120 | Clonlisk | Kilcomin | Roscrea |
| Agall | 72 | Ballycowan | Lynally | Tullamore |
| Agall | 198 | Ballycowan | Rahan | Tullamore |
| Aghaboy | 123 | Garrycastle | Wheery or Killagally | Parsonstown |
| Aghadonagh | 211 | Ballycowan | Rahan | Tullamore |
| Aghadouglas | 231 | Clonlisk | Ettagh | Roscrea |
| Aghafin | 212 | Garrycastle | Lemanaghan | Parsonstown |
| Aghagoogy | 451 | Eglish | Eglish | Parsonstown |
| Aghagurty | 380 | Ballybritt | Seirkieran | Parsonstown |
| Aghalusky | 217 | Ballycowan | Rahan | Tullamore |
| Aghameelick | 397 | Coolestown | Clonsast | Edenderry |
| Aghamore | 113 | Lower Philipstown | Croghan | Edenderry |
| Aghamore | 130 | Kilcoursey | Kilbride | Tullamore |
| Aghancarnan | 185 | Ballycowan | Durrow | Tullamore |
| Aghancon | 298 | Ballybritt | Aghancon | Roscrea |
| Aghanrush | 260 | Geashill | Geashill | Tullamore |
| Aghanvilla | 72 | Upper Philipstown | Ballykean | Mountmellick |
| Aghanvilla | 257 | Upper Philipstown | Geashill | Mountmellick |
| Aghnagross | 107 | Clonlisk | Dunkerrin | Roscrea |
| Aghnananagh | 400 | Ballycowan | Kilbride | Tullamore |
| Aghody | 207 | Ballybritt | Aghancon | Roscrea |
| Aghraboy | 30 | Ballybritt | Letterluna | Parsonstown |
| Aharney | 344 | Ballycowan | Kilbride | Tullamore |
| Alderborough | 152 | Geashill | Geashill | Tullamore |
| Annagharvey | 1,074 | Geashill | Geashill | Tullamore |
| Annaghbeg & Annaghmore | 1,153 | Eglish | Drumcullen | Parsonstown |
| Annaghbrack Glebe | 846 | Ballyboy | Killoughy | Tullamore |
| Annaghmore | 258 | Garrycastle | Tisaran | Parsonstown |
| Annaghmore & Annaghbeg | 1,153 | Eglish | Drumcullen | Parsonstown |
| Annamoe | 375 | Upper Philipstown | Clonyhurk | Mountmellick |
| Ard | 816 | Upper Philipstown | Geashill | Mountmellick |
| Ardan | 749 | Ballycowan | Kilbride | Tullamore |
| Ardavagga | 77 | Clonlisk | Kilmurryely | Roscrea |
| Ardbash | 107 | Coolestown | Ballynakill | Edenderry |
| Ardnurcher Glebe | 80 | Kilcoursey | Ardnurcher or Horseleap | Tullamore |
| Ardra | 392 | Coolestown | Clonsast | Edenderry |
| Armyhill | 80 | Clonlisk | Castletownely | Roscrea |
| Ash Island | 8 | Garrycastle | Tisaran | Parsonstown |
| Ashfield | 140 | Ballycowan | Durrow | Tullamore |
| Ashgrove (or MacNahanny) | 389 | Garrycastle | Lusmagh | Parsonstown |
| Attiblaney | 59 | Kilcoursey | Ardnurcher or Horseleap | Tullamore |
| Attinkee | 434 | Garrycastle | Gallen | Parsonstown |
| Backsteel | 34 | Ballycowan | Rahan | Tullamore |
| Backwood | 420 | Upper Philipstown | Ballykean | Mountmellick |
| Ballaghaderry | 54 | Ballyboy | Killoughy | Tullamore |
| Ballaghanoher | 577 | Garrycastle | Reynagh | Parsonstown |
| Ballaghassaan | 961 | Upper Philipstown | Geashill | Edenderry |
| Ballaghboy | 209 | Clonlisk | Kilmurryely | Roscrea |
| Ballard | 409 | Ballycowan | Lynally | Tullamore |
| Balleek | 318 | Ballycowan | Durrow | Tullamore |
| Balleek Beg | 110 | Ballycowan | Durrow | Tullamore |
| Ballickmoyler | 117 | Kilcoursey | Kilbride | Tullamore |
| Ballicknahee | 328 | Kilcoursey | Kilbride | Tullamore |
| Ballina | 190 | Geashill | Geashill | Tullamore |
| Ballina | 955 | Ballycowan | Rahan | Tullamore |
| **Ballinagar** | Town | Geashill | Geashill | Tullamore |
| Ballinagar | 362 | Geashill | Geashill | Tullamore |
| Ballinaminton East | 348 | Kilcoursey | Kilmanaghan | Tullamore |
| Ballinaminton West | 136 | Kilcoursey | Kilmanaghan | Tullamore |
| Ballinamoe | 271 | Clonlisk | Kilmurryely | Roscrea |
| Ballincloghan | 239 | Ballyboy | Ballyboy | Parsonstown |
| Ballincloghan | 208 | Ballycowan | Rahan | Tullamore |
| Ballincloghan Little | 105 | Ballyboy | Ballyboy | Parsonstown |
| Ballincor Demesne | 530 | Clonlisk | Kilmurryely | Roscrea |
| Ballincur | 331 | Ballybritt | Kinnitty | Parsonstown |
| Ballincur | 339 | Ballycowan | Rahan | Tullamore |
| Ballindarra | 185 | Ballybritt | Birr | Parsonstown |
| Ballindown | 380 | Eglish | Eglish | Parsonstown |
| Ballindrinan | 132 | Ballycowan | Rahan | Tullamore |
| Ballindrinnan | 331 | Ballyboy | Ballyboy | Parsonstown |
| Ballingorraun | 603 | Clonlisk | Cullenwaine | Roscrea |
| Ballingowan Glebe | 216 | Garrycastle | Gallen | Parsonstown |
| Ballinla | 400 | Coolestown | Monasteroris | Edenderry |
| Ballinloman | 231 | Garrycastle | Wheery or Killagally | Parsonstown |
| Ballinlough | 126 | Clonlisk | Aghancon | Roscrea |
| Ballinlough | 350 | Clonlisk | Borrisnafarney | Roscrea |
| Ballinlough | 305 | Clonlisk | Ettagh | Roscrea |
| Ballinowlart North | 177 | Coolestown | Clonsast | Edenderry |
| Ballinowlart South | 458 | Coolestown | Clonsast | Edenderry |
| Ballinrahin | 375 | Coolestown | Clonsast | Edenderry |
| Ballinrath | 560 | Coolestown | Ballynakill | Edenderry |
| Ballinree | 299 | Ballybritt | Birr | Parsonstown |
| Ballinree | 438 | Eglish | Drumcullen | Parsonstown |
| Ballintemple | 853 | Clonlisk | Templeharry | Roscrea |
| Ballintemple | 314 | Upper Philipstown | Geashill | Tullamore |
| Ballintogher | 313 | Upper Philipstown | Ballykean | Mountmellick |
| Ballintogher | 153 | Upper Philipstown | Geashill | Tullamore |
| Ballinvally | 1,473 | Geashill | Geashill | Tullamore |
| Ballinvoher | 193 | Upper Philipstown | Ballykean | Mountmellick |
| Balliver | 483 | Garrycastle | Gallen | Parsonstown |
| Ballyard (or Bellair) | 1,262 | Garrycastle | Lemanaghan | Parsonstown |
| Ballyatty | 379 | Clonlisk | Ettagh | Roscrea |
| Ballyavill | 569 | Geashill | Geashill | Tullamore |
| Ballybeg | 927 | Lower Philipstown | Croghan | Edenderry |
| Ballybeg | 398 | Clonlisk | Ettagh | Roscrea |
| Ballyboughlin | 105 | Kilcoursey | Kilbride | Tullamore |
| Ballybought | 913 | Ballycowan | Durrow | Tullamore |
| **Ballyboy** | Town | Ballyboy | Ballyboy | Parsonstown |
| Ballyboy | 296 | Ballyboy | Ballyboy | Parsonstown |
| Ballyboy | 225 | Garrycastle | Reynagh | Parsonstown |
| Ballybrack | 530 | Clonlisk | Roscrea | Roscrea |
| Ballybrackan (or Ridgemount) | 513 | Ballyboy | Ballyboy | Parsonstown |
| Ballybrackan Little | 230 | Ballyboy | Ballyboy | Parsonstown |
| Ballybritt | 591 | Ballybritt | Aghancon | Roscrea |
| Ballybrittan | 942 | Warrenstown | Ballymacwilliam | Edenderry |
| Ballybruncullin | 290 | Ballycowan | Rahan | Tullamore |
| Ballybryan | 346 | Warrenstown | Ballymacwilliam | Edenderry |
| Ballyburly | 431 | Warrenstown | Ballyburly | Edenderry |
| Ballycallaghan | 283 | Ballycowan | Durrow | Tullamore |
| Ballychristal | 20 | Upper Philipstown | Ballykean | Tullamore |
| Ballychristal | 381 | Upper Philipstown | Geashill | Tullamore |
| Ballyclare | 559 | Garrycastle | Wheery or Killagally | Parsonstown |
| Ballyclery | 402 | Clonlisk | Roscrea | Roscrea |
| Ballycolgan | 328 | Coolestown | Ballynakill | Edenderry |
| Ballycolgan | 169 | Coolestown | Monasteroris | Edenderry |
| Ballycollin | 256 | Eglish | Eglish | Parsonstown |
| Ballycollin | 357 | Geashill | Geashill | Tullamore |
| Ballycollin Lower | 147 | Ballyboy | Ballyboy | Parsonstown |
| Ballycollin Upper | 233 | Ballyboy | Ballyboy | Parsonstown |
| Ballycommon | 1,249 | Lower Philipstown | Ballycommon | Tullamore |
| Ballycon | 469 | Coolestown | Ballynakill | Edenderry |
| Ballycore | 69 | Ballyboy | Killoughy | Tullamore |
| Ballycormick | 263 | Clonlisk | Borrisnafarney | Roscrea |
| Ballycosney | 324 | Ballycowan | Kilbride | Tullamore |
| Ballycowan | 364 | Ballycowan | Kilbride | Tullamore |
| Ballycrumlin | 88 | Geashill | Geashill | Tullamore |
| Ballycue | 442 | Geashill | Geashill | Tullamore |
| **Ballycumber** | Town | Garrycastle | Lemanaghan | Parsonstown |
| Ballycumber | 453 | Garrycastle | Lemanaghan | Parsonstown |
| Ballycurragh | 405 | Ballybritt | Aghancon | Roscrea |
| Ballydaly | 273 | Garrycastle | Wheery or Killagally | Parsonstown |
| Ballydaly (or Derrynagall) | 464 | Ballycowan | Kilbride | Tullamore |
| Ballydermot | 878 | Coolestown | Clonsast | Edenderry |
| Ballydonagh | 666 | Clonlisk | Templeharry | Roscrea |
| Ballydownan | 1,016 | Geashill | Geashill | Tullamore |
| Ballydrohid | 310 | Ballycowan | Kilbride | Tullamore |
| Ballyduff | 519 | Garrycastle | Clonmacnoise | Parsonstown |
| Ballyduff | 498 | Ballybritt | Roscrea | Roscrea |
| Ballyduff | 375 | Upper Philipstown | Geashill | Tullamore |
| Ballyduff | 622 | Ballycowan | Kilbride | Tullamore |
| Ballyduff South | 541 | Geashill | Geashill | Tullamore |
| Ballyealan | 191 | Ballyboy | Killoughy | Tullamore |
| Ballyegan | 799 | Clonlisk | Kilcolman | Parsonstown |
| Ballyeighter | 231 | Garrycastle | Reynagh | Parsonstown |
| Ballyfarrell | 533 | Ballyboy | Killoughy | Tullamore |
| Ballyfore | 618 | Lower Philipstown | Croghan | Edenderry |
| Ballyfore Big | 209 | Coolestown | Ballynakill | Edenderry |
| Ballyfore Little | 42 | Coolestown | Ballynakill | Edenderry |
| Ballygaddy | 427 | Clonlisk | Kilcolman | Parsonstown |
| Ballygaddy | 361 | Ballybritt | Seirkieran | Parsonstown |
| Ballygarrett | 123 | Coolestown | Clonsast | Edenderry |
| Ballyheashill | 601 | Warrenstown | Ballymacwilliam | Edenderry |
| Ballyhugh | 396 | Coolestown | Monasteroris | Edenderry |
| Ballyhugh (or Springfield) | 185 | Coolestown | Ballynakill | Edenderry |
| Ballykealy | 293 | Eglish | Eglish | Parsonstown |
| Ballykean | 899 | Upper Philipstown | Ballykean | Mountmellick |
| Ballykeenaghan | 357 | Ballycowan | Rahan | Tullamore |
| Ballykelly | 136 | Ballybritt | Letterluna | Parsonstown |
| Ballykilcross | 76 | Kilcoursey | Kilbride | Tullamore |
| Ballykilleen | 1,229 | Coolestown | Ballynakill | Edenderry |
| Ballykilleen | 355 | Clonlisk | Kilmurryely | Roscrea |
| Ballykilleen | 391 | Kilcoursey | Ardnurcher or Horseleap | Tullamore |
| Ballykilmurry | 779 | Ballycowan | Kilbride | Tullamore |
| Ballyknockan | 386 | Clonlisk | Ettagh | Roscrea |
| Ballyknockan | 232 | Geashill | Geashill | Tullamore |
| Ballyleakin | 277 | Coolestown | Ballynakill | Edenderry |
| Ballylennon | 499 | Lower Philipstown | Kilclonfert | Tullamore |
| Ballylevin | 493 | Geashill | Geashill | Tullamore |
| Ballylier | 45 | Garrycastle | Lusmagh | Parsonstown |
| Ballylin | 583 | Garrycastle | Wheery or Killagally | Parsonstown |
| Ballylonnan | 116 | Ballyboy | Ballyboy | Parsonstown |
| Ballylonnan | 313 | Clonlisk | Kilmurryely | Roscrea |
| Ballyloughan | 322 | Garrycastle | Gallen | Parsonstown |
| Ballymacmurragh | 533 | Ballybritt | Kinnitty | Parsonstown |
| Ballymacoolaghan | 220 | Garrycastle | Lusmagh | Parsonstown |
| Ballymacrossan | 609 | Upper Philipstown | Ballykean | Mountmellick |
| Ballymacrossan | 625 | Upper Philipstown | Geashill | Mountmellick |
| Ballymacwilliam | 396 | Warrenstown | Ballymacwilliam | Edenderry |
| Ballymaddock | 30 | Ballyboy | Ballyboy | Parsonstown |
| Ballymooney | 586 | Geashill | Geashill | Tullamore |
| Ballymoran | 32 | Coolestown | Ballynakill | Edenderry |
| Ballymoran | 368 | Coolestown | Monasteroris | Edenderry |
| Ballymullen | 302 | Lower Philipstown | Kilclonfert | Tullamore |
| Ballynacanty | 537 | Ballyboy | Killoughy | Tullamore |
| Ballynacard | 391 | Eglish | Eglish | Parsonstown |
| Ballynacarrig | 1,223 | Ballyboy | Ballyboy | Parsonstown |
| Ballynacurra | 217 | Eglish | Eglish | Parsonstown |
| Ballynagh | 87 | Ballycowan | Lynally | Tullamore |
| Ballynaguilsha | 448 | Eglish | Eglish | Parsonstown |
| Ballynahinch | 105 | Kilcoursey | Kilcumreragh | Tullamore |
| Ballynakill | 426 | Coolestown | Ballynakill | Edenderry |
| Ballynakill | 496 | Clonlisk | Cullenwaine | Roscrea |
| Ballynakill | 1,055 | Upper Philipstown | Geashill | Tullamore |
| Ballynakill Beg | 312 | Kilcoursey | Ardnurcher or Horseleap | Tullamore |
| Ballynakill Little | 104 | Kilcoursey | Ardnurcher or Horseleap | Tullamore |
| Ballynalack | 148 | Ballybritt | Kinnitty | Parsonstown |
| Ballynamire | 323 | Ballycowan | Kilbride | Tullamore |
| Ballynamona | 93 | Warrenstown | Ballyburly | Edenderry |
| Ballynamona | 494 | Ballycowan | Durrow | Tullamore |
| Ballynamona Glebe | 113 | Eglish | Drumcullen | Parsonstown |
| Ballynanum | 125 | Coolestown | Ballynakill | Edenderry |
| Ballynasrah | 927 | Garrycastle | Lusmagh | Parsonstown |
| Ballynasrah | 574 | Geashill | Geashill | Tullamore |
| Ballynasrah | 311 | Ballycowan | Kilbride | Tullamore |
| Ballynasrah (or Tinnycross) | 510 | Ballycowan | Kilbride | Tullamore |
| Ballyneena | 163 | Garrycastle | Reynagh | Parsonstown |
| Ballyoran | 350 | Ballyboy | Ballyboy | Parsonstown |
| Ballyowen | 493 | Lower Philipstown | Kilclonfert | Tullamore |
| Ballyowen | 69 | Lower Philipstown | Killaderry | Tullamore |
| Ballyphilip | 435 | Ballybritt | Aghancon | Roscrea |
| Ballyrickard | 191 | Clonlisk | Aghancon | Roscrea |
| Ballyrickard | 172 | Clonlisk | Aghancon | Roscrea |
| Ballyrihy | 1,034 | Clonlisk | Dunkerrin | Roscrea |
| Ballyroe | 230 | Eglish | Drumcullen | Parsonstown |
| Ballyshane | 177 | Coolestown | Clonsast | Edenderry |
| Ballyshane | 126 | Garrycastle | Gallen | Parsonstown |
| Ballyshane | 432 | Ballybritt | Kinnitty | Parsonstown |
| Ballysheil | 231 | Garrycastle | Gallen | Parsonstown |
| Ballyslavin | 268 | Garrycastle | Reynagh | Parsonstown |
| Ballystanly | 494 | Clonlisk | Dunkerrin | Roscrea |
| Ballystrig | 297 | Warrenstown | Ballyburly | Edenderry |
| Ballyteige Big | 483 | Lower Philipstown | Ballycommon | Tullamore |
| Ballyteige Little | 357 | Lower Philipstown | Ballycommon | Tullamore |
| Ballytoran | 178 | Clonlisk | Kilcomin | Roscrea |
| Ballyvlin | 92 | Garrycastle | Wheery or Killagally | Parsonstown |
| Ballyvora | 410 | Garrycastle | Wheery or Killagally | Parsonstown |
| Ballywilliam | 170 | Ballyboy | Ballyboy | Parsonstown |
| Ballywilliam | 531 | Eglish | Eglish | Parsonstown |
| Ballywilliam | 236 | Ballybritt | Roscomroe | Parsonstown |
| Ballywilliam | 90 | Ballybritt | Ettagh | Roscrea |
| Ballywilliam | 190 | Clonlisk | Kilcomin | Roscrea |
| Ballywilliamreagh | 210 | Ballyboy | Ballyboy | Parsonstown |
| **Banagher** | Town | Garrycastle | Reynagh | Parsonstown |
| Banagher (or Kylebeg) | 307 | Garrycastle | Reynagh | Parsonstown |
| Banragh Island | 9 | Garrycastle | Clonmacnoise | Parsonstown |
| Barcam | 659 | Ballybritt | Kinnitty | Parsonstown |
| Bariahan | 935 | Ballybritt | Letterluna | Parsonstown |
| Barna | 162 | Clonlisk | Dunkerrin | Roscrea |
| Barnaboy | 384 | Ballyboy | Ballyboy | Parsonstown |
| Barnaboy | 656 | Lower Philipstown | Kilclonfert | Tullamore |
| Barnagrotty | 474 | Clonlisk | Borrisnafarney | Roscrea |
| Barnan | 460 | Lower Philipstown | Kilclonfert | Tullamore |
| Barranaghs | 901 | Upper Philipstown | Clonyhurk | Mountmellick |
| Barrysbrook | 892 | Lower Philipstown | Ballyburly | Edenderry |
| Bawnmore | 247 | Geashill | Geashill | Tullamore |
| Beagh | 666 | Ballybritt | Roscomroe | Parsonstown |
| Beggarstown | 156 | Garrycastle | Lusmagh | Parsonstown |
| Behernagh | 141 | Clonlisk | Dunkerrin | Roscrea |
| Bellair (or Ballyard) | 1,262 | Garrycastle | Lemanaghan | Parsonstown |
| Bellhill | 281 | Ballybritt | Seirkieran | Parsonstown |
| Bellmount (or Lisderg) | 420 | Garrycastle | Tisaran | Parsonstown |
| Benfield | 137 | Upper Philipstown | Clonyhurk | Mountmellick |
| Bigwood | 170 | Ballybritt | Kilcolman | Parsonstown |
| Birds Island | 4 | Garrycastle | Reynagh | Parsonstown |
| **Birr (or Parsonstown)** | Town | Ballybritt | Birr | Parsonstown |
| Bishopswood | 438 | Upper Philipstown | Clonyhurk | Mountmellick |
| Blackbull | 115 | Garrycastle | Reynagh | Parsonstown |
| Blackwood | 192 | Ballycowan | Rahan | Tullamore |
| Bloomhill (or Cloncraff) | 1,626 | Garrycastle | Clonmacnoise | Parsonstown |
| Bogderries | 412 | Eglish | Eglish | Parsonstown |
| Boggaunreagh | 86 | Garrycastle | Reynagh | Parsonstown |
| Bogtown | 811 | Upper Philipstown | Ballykean | Mountmellick |
| Boheradurrow | 213 | Garrycastle | Reynagh | Parsonstown |
| Boherboy | 109 | Ballybritt | Birr | Parsonstown |
| Boherdeel | 182 | Ballybritt | Birr | Parsonstown |
| Boherfadda (or Parkaree) | 285 | Garrycastle | Lemanaghan | Parsonstown |
| Bohernagrisna | 360 | Ballycowan | Rahan | Tullamore |
| Bolart North | 117 | Kilcoursey | Kilmanaghan | Tullamore |
| Bolart South | 300 | Kilcoursey | Kilmanaghan | Tullamore |
| Boolakeel | 173 | Garrycastle | Reynagh | Parsonstown |
| Boolinarig Big | 543 | Eglish | Eglish | Parsonstown |
| Boolinarig Little | 87 | Eglish | Eglish | Parsonstown |
| Boolinarig School Land | 86 | Eglish | Eglish | Parsonstown |
| Borderreen | 37 | Upper Philipstown | Clonyhurk | Mountmellick |
| Borniagh Island | 3 | Garrycastle | Clonmacnoise | Parsonstown |
| Boultry | 116 | Clonlisk | Kilcomin | Roscrea |
| Boveen | 1,089 | Clonlisk | Kilcolman | Parsonstown |
| Brackagh | 535 | Upper Philipstown | Geashill | Edenderry |
| Brackagh | 159 | Kilcoursey | Kilcumreragh | Tullamore |
| Brackagh | 95 | Ballyboy | Killoughy | Tullamore |
| Brackagh | 86 | Ballycowan | Lynally | Tullamore |
| Brackagh | 272 | Ballycowan | Rahan | Tullamore |
| Bracklin Big | 1,069 | Lower Philipstown | Ballycommon | Tullamore |
| Bracklin Little | 601 | Lower Philipstown | Ballycommon | Tullamore |
| Bracknagh | 597 | Coolestown | Clonsast | Edenderry |
| Breaghmore | 827 | Ballybritt | Seirkieran | Parsonstown |
| Breaninch | 10 | Garrycastle | Lusmagh | Parsonstown |
| Bredagh | 51 | Ballybritt | Aghancon | Roscrea |
| Brehoge | 123 | Garrycastle | Wheery or Killagally | Parsonstown |
| Brickanagh | 545 | Clonlisk | Templeharry | Roscrea |
| Brockernagh | 123 | Clonlisk | Dunkerrin | Roscrea |
| Brookfield | 289 | Ballycowan | Lynally | Tullamore |
| **Brosna** | Town | Clonlisk | Kilmurryely | Roscrea |
| Brosna | 248 | Clonlisk | Kilmurryely | Roscrea |
| Broughal | 3,785 | Ballyboy | Ballyboy | Parsonstown |
| Brownhills | 115 | Ballybritt | Aghancon | Roscrea |
| Brownstown | 464 | Clonlisk | Cullenwaine | Roscrea |
| Bullock Island | 83 | Garrycastle | Gallen | Parsonstown |
| Bun | 320 | Garrycastle | Gallen | Parsonstown |
| Bunakeeran | 643 | Ballyboy | Killoughy | Tullamore |
| Bunaterin | 258 | Ballyboy | Killoughy | Tullamore |
| Bunaterin | 26 | Ballycowan | Lynally | Tullamore |
| Bunnagappagh | 615 | Upper Philipstown | Geashill | Tullamore |
| Bunrevan | 182 | Garrycastle | Lusmagh | Parsonstown |
| Bunsallagh | 946 | Lower Philipstown | Croghan | Edenderry |
| Burrow | 95 | Kilcoursey | Ardnurcher or Horseleap | Tullamore |
| Burrow (or Glennanummer) | 97 | Kilcoursey | Kilcumreragh | Tullamore |
| Busherstown | 712 | Clonlisk | Castletownely | Roscrea |
| Cadamstown | 863 | Ballybritt | Letterluna | Parsonstown |
| Cahills Island | 1 | Garrycastle | Lusmagh | Parsonstown |
| Camus | 128 | Garrycastle | Tisaran | Parsonstown |
| Cangort Demesne | 511 | Clonlisk | Shinrone | Roscrea |
| Cangort Park | 373 | Clonlisk | Shinrone | Roscrea |
| Cannakill | 209 | Lower Philipstown | Croghan | Edenderry |
| Caplevane | 260 | Garrycastle | Lusmagh | Parsonstown |
| Cappagh | 128 | Coolestown | Clonsast | Edenderry |
| Cappagh | 161 | Lower Philipstown | Kilclonfert | Tullamore |
| Cappagowlan | 508 | Ballyboy | Killoughy | Tullamore |
| Cappaloughan | 159 | Ballycowan | Rahan | Tullamore |
| Cappanageeragh | 294 | Geashill | Geashill | Tullamore |
| Cappanalosset | 386 | Garrycastle | Lemanaghan | Parsonstown |
| Cappanamorath | 28 | Kilcoursey | Kilbride | Tullamore |
| Cappancur | 1,933 | Geashill | Geashill | Tullamore |
| Cappydonnell Big | 159 | Kilcoursey | Ardnurcher or Horseleap | Tullamore |
| Cappydonnell Little | 120 | Kilcoursey | Ardnurcher or Horseleap | Tullamore |
| Cappyroe | 548 | Geashill | Geashill | Tullamore |
| Carrick | 1,408 | Warrenstown | Castlejordan | Edenderry |
| Carrick | 671 | Garrycastle | Gallen | Parsonstown |
| Carrigeen | 123 | Eglish | Eglish | Parsonstown |
| Carrigeen | 89 | Ballyboy | Killoughy | Tullamore |
| Carrowkeel | 391 | Garrycastle | Clonmacnoise | Parsonstown |
| Carrowmanagh | 206 | Garrycastle | Lusmagh | Parsonstown |
| Cartron | 59 | Ballycowan | Durrow | Tullamore |
| Cartron East | 194 | Ballycowan | Kilbride | Tullamore |
| Cartron Glebe | 141 | Kilcoursey | Kilcumreragh | Tullamore |
| Cartron West | 82 | Ballycowan | Kilbride | Tullamore |
| Castlearmstrong | 442 | Garrycastle | Lemanaghan | Parsonstown |
| Castlebarnagh Big | 220 | Lower Philipstown | Killaderry | Tullamore |
| Castlebarnagh Little | 74 | Lower Philipstown | Killaderry | Tullamore |
| Castlefield | 78 | Ballybritt | Letterluna | Parsonstown |
| Castlereagh | 318 | Garrycastle | Lemanaghan | Parsonstown |
| Castleroan | 525 | Clonlisk | Dunkerrin | Roscrea |
| Castletown | 744 | Ballycowan | Rahan | Tullamore |
| Castletown and Glinsk | 900 | Ballybritt | Kinnitty | Parsonstown |
| Castletwoon | 529 | Ballybritt | Birr | Parsonstown |
| Cavemount (or Mullalough) | 778 | Lower Philipstown | Kilclonfert | Tullamore |
| **Charlestown** | Town | Kilcoursey | Kilbride | Tullamore |
| Charlestown | 292 | Garrycastle | Clonmacnoise | Parsonstown |
| Charleville Demesne | 1,140 | Ballycowan | Lynally | Tullamore |
| Chevychase (or Derrynadarragh) | 349 | Coolestown | Clonsast | Edenderry |
| Church Hill | 102 | Ballycowan | Rahan | Tullamore |
| Churchland | 42 | Ballybritt | Seirkieran | Parsonstown |
| **Clara** | Town | Kilcoursey | Kilbride | Tullamore |
| Clara | 503 | Kilcoursey | Kilbride | Tullamore |
| Claragh | 107 | Ballycowan | Lynally | Tullamore |
| Clareen | 156 | Clonlisk | Kilmurryely | Roscrea |
| Claremount | 75 | Garrycastle | Reynagh | Parsonstown |
| Clarkkville | 81 | Coolestown | Monasteroris | Edenderry |
| Clarkville | 10 | Coolestown | Ballynakill | Edenderry |
| Clashagad Lower | 262 | Clonlisk | Dunkerrin | Roscrea |
| Clashagad Upper | 364 | Clonlisk | Dunkerrin | Roscrea |
| Clashroe | 988 | Ballybritt | Roscomroe | Parsonstown |
| Clogh | 59 | Ballybritt | Letterluna | Parsonstown |
| Cloghabrack | 119 | Ballycowan | Lynally | Tullamore |
| Cloghal Beg | 254 | Garrycastle | Tisaran | Parsonstown |
| Cloghal More | 292 | Garrycastle | Tisaran | Parsonstown |
| **Cloghan** | Town | Garrycastle | Gallen | Parsonstown |
| Cloghan | 158 | Garrycastle | Gallen | Parsonstown |
| Cloghan | 420 | Clonlisk | Ettagh | Roscrea |
| Cloghan Beg | 95 | Garrycastle | Lusmagh | Parsonstown |
| Cloghan Demesne | 624 | Garrycastle | Lusmagh | Parsonstown |
| Cloghanamina | 96 | Kilcoursey | Kilmanaghan | Tullamore |
| Cloghanbane | 113 | Ballycowan | Lynally | Tullamore |
| Cloghanhill (or Coolreagh) | 955 | Garrycastle | Gallen | Parsonstown |
| Cloghanmore | 322 | Eglish | Drumcullen | Parsonstown |
| Cloghatanny | 598 | Kilcoursey | Kilmanaghan | Tullamore |
| Cloghmoyle | 233 | Clonlisk | Shinrone | Roscrea |
| Clonad | 896 | Coolestown | Clonsast | Edenderry |
| Clonad | 537 | Geashill | Geashill | Tullamore |
| Clonad | 1,302 | Lower Philipstown | Killaderry | Tullamore |
| Clonaderg | 1,429 | Garrycastle | Clonmacnoise | Parsonstown |
| Clonagannagh | 549 | Clonlisk | Dunkerrin | Roscrea |
| Clonagh | 463 | Lower Philipstown | Kilclonfert | Tullamore |
| Clonagh East | 379 | Ballycowan | Lynally | Tullamore |
| Clonagh West | 293 | Ballycowan | Lynally | Tullamore |
| Clonahenoge | 535 | Garrycastle | Lusmagh | Parsonstown |
| Clonarrow (or Riverlyons) | 1,897 | Lower Philipstown | Kilclonfert | Tullamore |
| Clonascra | 1,055 | Garrycastle | Clonmacnoise | Parsonstown |
| Clonavoe | 1,807 | Coolestown | Clonsast | Edenderry |
| Clonbeale Beg Glebe | 159 | Eglish | Drumcullen | Parsonstown |
| Clonbeale More | 647 | Eglish | Drumcullen | Parsonstown |
| Clonbeg | 424 | Ballybritt | Kilcolman | Parsonstown |
| Clonbonniff | 1,039 | Garrycastle | Tisaran | Parsonstown |
| Clonbrennan | 45 | Clonlisk | Dunkerrin | Roscrea |
| Clonbrennan | 172 | Clonlisk | Roscrea | Roscrea |
| Clonbrin | 920 | Coolestown | Clonsast | Edenderry |
| Clonbrock Lower | 240 | Coolestown | Clonsast | Edenderry |
| Clonbrock Upper | 236 | Coolestown | Clonsast | Edenderry |
| Clonbrone | 204 | Ballybritt | Birr | Parsonstown |
| Clonbrone | 135 | Eglish | Drumcullen | Parsonstown |
| Clonbrown | 1,103 | Coolestown | Clonsast | Edenderry |
| **Clonbulloge** | Town | Coolestown | Clonsast | Edenderry |
| Clonbulloge | 522 | Coolestown | Clonsast | Edenderry |
| Cloncallow (or Cushcallow) | 197 | Garrycastle | Reynagh | Parsonstown |
| Cloncanon | 960 | Coolestown | Monasteroris | Edenderry |
| Cloncant | 975 | Coolestown | Clonsast | Edenderry |
| Cloncarban | 458 | Eglish | Drumcullen | Parsonstown |
| Cloncassan | 295 | Coolestown | Clonsast | Edenderry |
| Cloncoher | 301 | Geashill | Geashill | Tullamore |
| Cloncollog | 467 | Ballycowan | Kilbride | Tullamore |
| Cloncon | 555 | Geashill | Geashill | Tullamore |
| Cloncraff | 157 | Kilcoursey | Ardnurcher or Horseleap | Tullamore |
| Cloncraff (or Bloomhill) | 1,626 | Garrycastle | Clonmacnoise | Parsonstown |
| Cloncreen | 1,829 | Coolestown | Clonsast | Edenderry |
| Clondallow | 508 | Eglish | Eglish | Parsonstown |
| Clondelara | 727 | Garrycastle | Clonmacnoise | Parsonstown |
| Clondonnell Glebe | 138 | Ballyboy | Killoughy | Tullamore |
| Clondoolusk | 322 | Upper Philipstown | Clonyhurk | Mountmellick |
| Clonearl | 91 | Lower Philipstown | Killaderry | Tullamore |
| Clonearl Demesne | 716 | Lower Philipstown | Kilclonfert | Tullamore |
| Cloneen | 292 | Lower Philipstown | Kilclonfert | Tullamore |
| Clonever | 334 | Garrycastle | Clonmacnoise | Parsonstown |
| Clonfinlough | 2,457 | Garrycastle | Clonmacnoise | Parsonstown |
| Clongarret | 822 | Coolestown | Clonsast | Edenderry |
| Clongawny | 833 | Garrycastle | Clonmacnoise | Parsonstown |
| Clongawny Beg | 99 | Garrycastle | Reynagh | Parsonstown |
| Clongawny More | 805 | Garrycastle | Reynagh | Parsonstown |
| Clonin | 587 | Warrenstown | Ballyburly | Edenderry |
| Clonkeen | 107 | Coolestown | Clonsast | Edenderry |
| Clonkelly | 534 | Ballybritt | Birr | Parsonstown |
| Clonlack | 323 | Coolestown | Castlejordan | Edenderry |
| Clonlee | 896 | Ballybritt | Kinnitty | Parsonstown |
| Clonlisk | 466 | Clonlisk | Kilcomin | Roscrea |
| Clonlyon (Gerald) | 530 | Garrycastle | Clonmacnoise | Parsonstown |
| Clonlyon Castlequarter | 659 | Garrycastle | Clonmacnoise | Parsonstown |
| Clonlyon Glebe | 886 | Garrycastle | Clonmacnoise | Parsonstown |
| Clonmacnoise | 913 | Garrycastle | Clonmacnoise | Parsonstown |
| Clonmare | 1,741 | Warrenstown | Castlejordan | Edenderry |
| Clonmeen | 655 | Coolestown | Castlejordan | Edenderry |
| Clonmel | 685 | Coolestown | Clonsast | Edenderry |
| Clonminch | 717 | Ballycowan | Kilbride | Tullamore |
| Clonmore | 427 | Coolestown | Clonsast | Edenderry |
| Clonmore | 60 | Ballybritt | Seirkieran | Parsonstown |
| Clonmore | 708 | Geashill | Geashill | Tullamore |
| Clonoghil Lower | 578 | Ballybritt | Birr | Parsonstown |
| Clonoghil Upper | 541 | Ballybritt | Birr | Parsonstown |
| **Clonony** | Town | Garrycastle | Gallen | Parsonstown |
| Clonony Beg | 693 | Garrycastle | Gallen | Parsonstown |
| Clonony More | 732 | Garrycastle | Gallen | Parsonstown |
| Clonrah and Glaster | 261 | Garrycastle | Lusmagh | Parsonstown |
| Clonroosk Big | 158 | Coolestown | Clonsast | Edenderry |
| Clonroosk Little | 110 | Coolestown | Clonsast | Edenderry |
| Clonsast Lower | 1,077 | Coolestown | Clonsast | Edenderry |
| Clonsast Upper | 1,775 | Coolestown | Clonsast | Edenderry |
| Clonseer | 132 | Ballyboy | Killoughy | Tullamore |
| Clonshannagh | 494 | Ballyboy | Killoughy | Tullamore |
| Clonshannon | 815 | Coolestown | Clonsast | Edenderry |
| Clonshanny | 496 | Ballycowan | Rahan | Tullamore |
| Clontaglass | 285 | Ballyboy | Ballyboy | Parsonstown |
| Clonterlough | 140 | Ballyboy | Killoughy | Tullamore |
| Clontiff | 415 | Garrycastle | Clonmacnoise | Parsonstown |
| Clontotan | 123 | Garrycastle | Reynagh | Parsonstown |
| **Clonygowan** | Town | Upper Philipstown | Ballykean | Mountmellick |
| Clonygowan | 953 | Upper Philipstown | Ballykean | Mountmellick |
| Clonyhurk | 1,073 | Upper Philipstown | Clonyhurk | Mountmellick |
| Clonymohan | 480 | Clonlisk | Castletownely | Roscrea |
| Clonyquin | 732 | Upper Philipstown | Clonyhurk | Mountmellick |
| Cloonacullina | 280 | Garrycastle | Reynagh | Parsonstown |
| Cloonaheen | 614 | Clonlisk | Kilmurryely | Roscrea |
| Cloonalisk | 259 | Clonlisk | Templeharry | Roscrea |
| Cloonaloughan | 271 | Clonlisk | Templeharry | Roscrea |
| Clooneen | 467 | Eglish | Eglish | Parsonstown |
| Clooneen (or Lettybrook) | 331 | Ballybritt | Letterluna | Parsonstown |
| Clooneencapullagh | 83 | Ballybritt | Seirkieran | Roscrea |
| Clorhane | 629 | Garrycastle | Clonmacnoise | Parsonstown |
| Clucka North | 180 | Clonlisk | Kilcomin | Roscrea |
| Clucka South | 34 | Clonlisk | Kilcomin | Roscrea |
| Clyduff | 668 | Clonlisk | Dunkerrin | Roscrea |
| Clyduff | 349 | Lower Philipstown | Kilclonfert | Tullamore |
| Clynoc | 214 | Clonlisk | Cullenwaine | Roscrea |
| Clyn's Island | 4 | Garrycastle | Reynagh | Parsonstown |
| Coagh Lower | 259 | Eglish | Drumcullen | Parsonstown |
| Coagh Upper | 271 | Eglish | Drumcullen | Parsonstown |
| Codd | 764 | Coolestown | Monasteroris | Edenderry |
| Cogran | 405 | Garrycastle | Lusmagh | Parsonstown |
| Coldblow | 95 | Ballybritt | Aghancon | Roscrea |
| Coldblow | 164 | Clonlisk | Kilcomin | Roscrea |
| Colehill | 716 | Geashill | Geashill | Tullamore |
| Coleraine | 317 | Ballycowan | Durrow | Tullamore |
| Colgagh | 319 | Coolestown | Clonsast | Edenderry |
| Colmanstown | 39 | Eglish | Drumcullen | Parsonstown |
| **Coneyburrow** | Town | Coolestown | Monasteroris | Edenderry |
| Conicker | 185 | Clonlisk | Ettagh | Roscrea |
| Coniker | 161 | Ballycowan | Durrow | Tullamore |
| Conspark | 123 | Garrycastle | Reynagh | Parsonstown |
| Contiffeen | 587 | Garrycastle | Clonmacnoise | Parsonstown |
| Coolacrease | 508 | Ballybritt | Letterluna | Parsonstown |
| Coolagary | 731 | Upper Philipstown | Geashill | Tullamore |
| Coolaghansglaster | 480 | Garrycastle | Lusmagh | Parsonstown |
| Coolanarney | 428 | Ballyboy | Killoughy | Tullamore |
| Coolanure | 209 | Ballybritt | Roscrea | Roscrea |
| Coolcor | 675 | Warrenstown | Ballyburly | Edenderry |
| Coolcreen | 485 | Ballybritt | Letterluna | Parsonstown |
| Coolderry | 236 | Garrycastle | Reynagh | Parsonstown |
| Coolderry | 310 | Clonlisk | Ettagh | Roscrea |
| Cooldorragh | 885 | Garrycastle | Lemanaghan | Parsonstown |
| Cooldorragh | 135 | Ballybritt | Roscomroe | Roscrea |
| Cooldorragh Glebe | 275 | Ballyboy | Killoughy | Tullamore |
| Coole | 777 | Lower Philipstown | Ballyburly | Edenderry |
| Coole | 256 | Eglish | Drumcullen | Parsonstown |
| Coole | 539 | Garrycastle | Wheery or Killagally | Parsonstown |
| Cooleshill | 194 | Ballybritt | Corbally | Roscrea |
| Cooleshill | 175 | Ballybritt | Roscrea | Roscrea |
| Coolfin | 301 | Garrycastle | Reynagh | Parsonstown |
| Coolfin Glebe | 671 | Ballyboy | Ballyboy | Parsonstown |
| Coolnagrower | 344 | Ballybritt | Birr | Parsonstown |
| Coolnahely | 618 | Ballycowan | Durrow | Tullamore |
| Coolnahinch | 132 | Garrycastle | Gallen | Parsonstown |
| Coologe | 248 | Eglish | Eglish | Parsonstown |
| Coolreagh (or Cloghanhill) | 955 | Garrycastle | Gallen | Parsonstown |
| Coolreagh Glebe | 123 | Ballyboy | Ballyboy | Parsonstown |
| Coolroe | 203 | Clonlisk | Dunkerrin | Roscrea |
| Coolroe | 320 | Clonlisk | Ettagh | Roscrea |
| Cooltycanon | 725 | Upper Philipstown | Clonyhurk | Mountmellick |
| Coolville | 158 | Warrenstown | Ballyburly | Edenderry |
| Coolygagan | 416 | Coolestown | Clonsast | Edenderry |
| Cor Beg and Cor More | 611 | Garrycastle | Lemanaghan | Parsonstown |
| Cor More and Cor Beg | 611 | Garrycastle | Lemanaghan | Parsonstown |
| Coraknock Glebe | 32 | Garrycastle | Gallen | Parsonstown |
| Corbane | 268 | Garrycastle | Lemanaghan | Parsonstown |
| Corbetstown | 1,188 | Warrenstown | Castlejordan | Edenderry |
| Corclogh | 143 | Garrycastle | Lusmagh | Parsonstown |
| Corcush | 76 | Ballycowan | Rahan | Tullamore |
| Corgarve North | 23 | Garrycastle | Lusmagh | Parsonstown |
| Corgarve South | 24 | Garrycastle | Lusmagh | Parsonstown |
| Cormeen | 155 | Ballyboy | Killoughy | Tullamore |
| Cornafurrish & Corrabeg | 279 | Garrycastle | Lemanaghan | Parsonstown |
| Cornagark | 181 | Eglish | Drumcullen | Parsonstown |
| Cornalaur | 553 | Ballycowan | Rahan | Tullamore |
| Cornamona | 214 | Garrycastle | Gallen | Parsonstown |
| Corndarragh | 334 | Ballycowan | Kilbride | Tullamore |
| Corrabeagh | 246 | Garrycastle | Lemanaghan | Parsonstown |
| Corraclevin | 958 | Clonlisk | Dunkerrin | Roscrea |
| Corracullin | 777 | Garrycastle | Lemanaghan | Parsonstown |
| Corroe and Grogan | 375 | Garrycastle | Lemanaghan | Parsonstown |
| Cortullagh (or Grove) | 1,092 | Garrycastle | Gallen | Parsonstown |
| Cottarnagh Island | 6 | Garrycastle | Clonmacnoise | Parsonstown |
| Courtland (or Viewmount) | 24 | Ballybritt | Seirkieran | Parsonstown |
| Cranasallagh | 371 | Garrycastle | Lemanaghan | Tullamore |
| Crancreagh | 280 | Garrycastle | Gallen | Parsonstown |
| Cree | 282 | Ballybritt | Birr | Parsonstown |
| Cree | 577 | Ballybritt | Kilcolman | Parsonstown |
| Creevagh | 1,268 | Garrycastle | Clonmacnoise | Parsonstown |
| Creggan | 664 | Garrycastle | Wheery or Killagally | Parsonstown |
| Creggan & Glosterboy | 158 | Garrycastle | Gallen | Parsonstown |
| **Crinkill** | Town | Ballybritt | Birr | Parsonstown |
| Crinkill | 948 | Ballybritt | Birr | Parsonstown |
| Croghan Demesne | 305 | Lower Philipstown | Ballyburly | Edenderry |
| Croghan Demesne | 160 | Lower Philipstown | Croghan | Edenderry |
| Croghanhill | 70 | Lower Philipstown | Ballyburly | Edenderry |
| Croghanhill | 86 | Lower Philipstown | Croghan | Edenderry |
| Croughil | 99 | Clonlisk | Dunkerrin | Roscrea |
| Cruit | 437 | Lower Philipstown | Kilclonfert | Tullamore |
| Crumlin and Tulla | 822 | Ballybritt | Kinnitty | Parsonstown |
| Cuba | 104 | Garrycastle | Reynagh | Parsonstown |
| Culleen | 344 | Ballycowan | Durrow | Tullamore |
| Cullenwaine | 742 | Clonlisk | Cullenwaine | Roscrea |
| Cully | 417 | Ballyboy | Killoughy | Tullamore |
| Cumber Lower | 532 | Ballybritt | Kinnitty | Parsonstown |
| Cumber Upper | 590 | Ballybritt | Kinnitty | Parsonstown |
| Cummeen | 53 | Garrycastle | Reynagh | Parsonstown |
| Currabeg | 556 | Ballybritt | Letterluna | Parsonstown |
| Curragh | 295 | Clonlisk | Ettagh | Roscrea |
| Curragh | 227 | Geashill | Geashill | Tullamore |
| Curragh Lower | 182 | Eglish | Drumcullen | Parsonstown |
| Curragh Upper | 101 | Eglish | Drumcullen | Parsonstown |
| Curraghalassa | 323 | Garrycastle | Wheery or Killagally | Parsonstown |
| Curraghanana | 95 | Kilcoursey | Kilcumreragh | Tullamore |
| Curraghavarna (or Portavrolla) | 235 | Garrycastle | Reynagh | Parsonstown |
| Curraghboy (or Woodfield) | 624 | Kilcoursey | Kilbride | Tullamore |
| Curraghkeel | 126 | Garrycastle | Reynagh | Parsonstown |
| Curraghlahan | 126 | Garrycastle | Reynagh | Parsonstown |
| Curraghmeelagh | 271 | Ballyboy | Killoughy | Tullamore |
| Curraghmore | 592 | Garrycastle | Clonmacnoise | Parsonstown |
| Curraghmore | 696 | Eglish | Drumcullen | Parsonstown |
| Curraghwheery | 87 | Garrycastle | Wheery or Killagally | Parsonstown |
| Curralanty | 539 | Clonlisk | Kilmurryely | Roscrea |
| Currygurry | 108 | Ballycowan | Rahan | Tullamore |
| Cush | 270 | Eglish | Eglish | Parsonstown |
| Cush | 125 | Garrycastle | Gallen | Parsonstown |
| Cush East | 339 | Garrycastle | Gallen | Parsonstown |
| Cushaling | 1,286 | Coolestown | Monasteroris | Edenderry |
| Cushcallow (or Cloncallow) | 197 | Garrycastle | Reynagh | Parsonstown |
| Cushina | 755 | Coolestown | Clonsast | Edenderry |
| Cushina | 1,787 | Upper Philipstown | Ballykean | Mountmellick |
| Dalgan | 271 | Geashill | Geashill | Tullamore |
| Danganbeg | 178 | Geashill | Geashill | Tullamore |
| Danganreagh | 87 | Ballybritt | Aghancon | Roscrea |
| Davistown | 210 | Eglish | Drumcullen | Parsonstown |
| Deerpark | 422 | Ballybritt | Letterluna | Parsonstown |
| Deerpark | 301 | Garrycastle | Tisaran | Parsonstown |
| Deerpark | 321 | Ballycowan | Rahan | Tullamore |
| Derinduff | 224 | Ballybritt | Birr | Parsonstown |
| Dernafanny | 139 | Garrycastle | Reynagh | Parsonstown |
| Derreen | 313 | Upper Philipstown | Ballykean | Mountmellick |
| Derrica Beg | 74 | Garrycastle | Wheery or Killagally | Parsonstown |
| Derrica More | 303 | Garrycastle | Wheery or Killagally | Parsonstown |
| Derries | 1,693 | Coolestown | Monasteroris | Edenderry |
| Derries | 720 | Garrycastle | Wheery or Killagally | Parsonstown |
| Derries | 170 | Lower Philipstown | Kilclonfert | Tullamore |
| Derries | 294 | Ballyboy | Killoughy | Tullamore |
| Derries | 559 | Ballycowan | Rahan | Tullamore |
| Derrinboy | 460 | Ballyboy | Ballyboy | Parsonstown |
| Derrinclare | 377 | Clonlisk | Kilcomin | Roscrea |
| Derrinlough | 1,514 | Eglish | Eglish | Parsonstown |
| Derrinvullig | 596 | Ballycowan | Rahan | Tullamore |
| Derrooly | 483 | Ballycowan | Rahan | Tullamore |
| Derry Lower | 184 | Eglish | Drumcullen | Parsonstown |
| Derry Upper | 66 | Eglish | Drumcullen | Parsonstown |
| Derryad | 260 | Eglish | Eglish | Parsonstown |
| Derryad | 131 | Geashill | Geashill | Tullamore |
| Derryarkin | 982 | Lower Philipstown | Croghan | Edenderry |
| Derrybeg | 221 | Ballybritt | Seirkieran | Parsonstown |
| Derrybeg | 423 | Geashill | Geashill | Tullamore |
| Derrycarney | 364 | Garrycastle | Gallen | Parsonstown |
| Derryclure | 196 | Geashill | Geashill | Tullamore |
| Derrycoffey | 898 | Lower Philipstown | Croghan | Edenderry |
| Derrycooly | 1,707 | Ballycowan | Rahan | Tullamore |
| Derrycricket | 747 | Upper Philipstown | Geashill | Edenderry |
| Derrydolney | 1,427 | Ballyboy | Killoughy | Tullamore |
| Derryesker | 265 | Ballycowan | Rahan | Tullamore |
| Derrygarran | 351 | Coolestown | Clonsast | Edenderry |
| Derrygolan | 436 | Geashill | Geashill | Tullamore |
| Derrygreenagh | 1,115 | Warrenstown | Castlejordan | Edenderry |
| Derrygrogan Big | 240 | Lower Philipstown | Ballycommon | Tullamore |
| Derrygrogan Little | 217 | Lower Philipstown | Ballycommon | Tullamore |
| Derrygunnigan | 202 | Geashill | Geashill | Tullamore |
| Derryharan and Timolin (or Derryholmes) | 533 | Garrycastle | Tisaran | Parsonstown |
| Derryharney | 456 | Garrycastle | Clonmacnoise | Parsonstown |
| Derryhask | 487 | Garrycastle | Clonmacnoise | Parsonstown |
| Derryholmes (or Timolin & Derryharan) | 533 | Garrycastle | Tisaran | Parsonstown |
| Derryiron | 983 | Warrenstown | Ballyburly | Edenderry |
| Derrykeel | 540 | Ballybritt | Kinnitty | Parsonstown |
| Derrylahan | 449 | Garrycastle | Clonmacnoise | Parsonstown |
| Derrylahan | 157 | Ballyboy | Killoughy | Tullamore |
| Derrymacedmond | 167 | Clonlisk | Kilmurryely | Roscrea |
| Derrymore | 293 | Coolestown | Clonsast | Edenderry |
| Derrymore | 726 | Ballyboy | Killoughy | Tullamore |
| Derrymullin (or Loughderry) | 369 | Eglish | Eglish | Parsonstown |
| Derrynadarragh (or Chevychase) | 349 | Coolestown | Clonsast | Edenderry |
| Derrynagall (or Ballydaly) | 464 | Ballycowan | Kilbride | Tullamore |
| Derrynagun | 409 | Garrycastle | Lemanaghan | Parsonstown |
| Derrynanagh | 122 | Ballycowan | Rahan | Tullamore |
| Derrynanagh (or Tullymorerahan) | 119 | Ballycowan | Rahan | Tullamore |
| Derryounce | 171 | Upper Philipstown | Ballykean | Mountmellick |
| Derryvilla | 509 | Upper Philipstown | Clonyhurk | Mountmellick |
| Derryweelan | 143 | Geashill | Geashill | Tullamore |
| Doon Demesne | 981 | Garrycastle | Lemanaghan | Parsonstown |
| Doorosheath | 50 | Eglish | Eglish | Parsonstown |
| Doory | 609 | Ballycowan | Durrow | Tullamore |
| Dove Hill | 500 | Eglish | Drumcullen | Parsonstown |
| Dovegrove | 459 | Eglish | Eglish | Parsonstown |
| Down | 196 | Upper Philipstown | Ballykean | Mountmellick |
| Down | 445 | Lower Philipstown | Killaderry | Tullamore |
| Drinagh | 1,683 | Eglish | Eglish | Parsonstown |
| Drinagh and Knockhill | 436 | Ballyboy | Ballyboy | Parsonstown |
| Drishoge (or Strawberryhill) | 182 | Garrycastle | Gallen | Parsonstown |
| Dromoyle | 820 | Ballybritt | Kilcolman | Parsonstown |
| Droughtville | 287 | Eglish | Drumcullen | Parsonstown |
| Drumakeenan | 327 | Clonlisk | Ettagh | Roscrea |
| Drumakeenan | 412 | Clonlisk | Roscrea | Roscrea |
| Drumbane | 103 | Ballybritt | Birr | Parsonstown |
| Drumcaw (or Mountlucas) | 1,250 | Coolestown | Ballynakill | Edenderry |
| Drumcooly | 1,096 | Coolestown | Monasteroris | Edenderry |
| Druminduff | 70 | Clonlisk | Shinrone | Roscrea |
| Drummin | 40 | Ballybritt | Letterluna | Parsonstown |
| Drumroe | 296 | Clonlisk | Castletownely | Roscrea |
| Dunard | 61 | Kilcoursey | Ardnurcher or Horseleap | Tullamore |
| Dungar | 223 | Ballybritt | Corbally | Roscrea |
| Dungar | 368 | Ballybritt | Roscrea | Roscrea |
| **Dunkerrin** | Town | Clonlisk | Dunkerrin | Roscrea |
| Dunville | 198 | Warrenstown | Ballyburly | Edenderry |
| Durrow Demesne | 605 | Ballycowan | Durrow | Tullamore |
| Earlscartron | 32 | Kilcoursey | Kilcumreragh | Tullamore |
| **Edenderry** | Town | Coolestown | Monasteroris | Edenderry |
| Edenderry | 2,003 | Coolestown | Monasteroris | Edenderry |
| Eglish | 729 | Eglish | Eglish | Parsonstown |
| Emmel | 385 | Clonlisk | Templeharry | Roscrea |
| Emmel East | 206 | Clonlisk | Templeharry | Roscrea |
| Emmel West | 308 | Clonlisk | Templeharry | Roscrea |
| Enaghan | 1,278 | Upper Philipstown | Ballykean | Tullamore |
| Endrim | 1,642 | Garrycastle | Wheery or Killagally | Parsonstown |
| Erry (Armstrong) | 832 | Kilcoursey | Kilbride | Tullamore |
| Erry (Maryborough) | 1,844 | Kilcoursey | Kilbride | Tullamore |
| Esker | 599 | Garrycastle | Lemanaghan | Parsonstown |
| Esker Beg | 49 | Coolestown | Ballynakill | Edenderry |
| Esker Beg | 46 | Coolestown | Monasteroris | Edenderry |
| Esker More | 1,455 | Coolestown | Ballynakill | Edenderry |
| Esker More | 930 | Coolestown | Monasteroris | Edenderry |
| Faddan More | 258 | Garrycastle | Tisaran | Parsonstown |
| Fadden Beg | 549 | Garrycastle | Tisaran | Parsonstown |
| Faheeran | 484 | Kilcoursey | Kilcumreragh | Tullamore |
| Fahy | 138 | Warrenstown | Ballyburly | Edenderry |
| Fairfield | 161 | Lower Philipstown | Ballycommon | Tullamore |
| Falsk | 1,107 | Garrycastle | Gallen | Parsonstown |
| Fanbeg | 26 | Coolestown | Clonsast | Edenderry |
| Fancroft | 490 | Ballybritt | Seirkieran | Roscrea |
| Farranmacshane | 43 | Garrycastle | Tisaran | Parsonstown |
| Fearaghalee | 92 | Garrycastle | Tisaran | Parsonstown |
| Fearboy | 184 | Kilcoursey | Kilcumreragh | Tullamore |
| Feargarrow | 114 | Kilcoursey | Kilcumreragh | Tullamore |
| Fearnamona | 115 | Upper Philipstown | Ballykean | Mountmellick |
| Feeghroe (or Mountcarteret) | 52 | Garrycastle | Reynagh | Parsonstown |
| Feeghs | 191 | Garrycastle | Reynagh | Parsonstown |
| **Ferbane** | Town | Garrycastle | Gallen | Parsonstown |
| **Ferbane** | Town | Garrycastle | Wheery or Killagally | Parsonstown |
| Ferbane | 356 | Garrycastle | Wheery or Killagally | Parsonstown |
| Fertaun | 62 | Ballycowan | Lynally | Tullamore |
| Finter | 598 | Geashill | Ballykean | Tullamore |
| Forelacka | 1,415 | Ballybritt | Kinnitty | Parsonstown |
| Fortel | 1,182 | Ballybritt | Birr | Parsonstown |
| Fortwilliam | 44 | Clonlisk | Aghancon | Roscrea |
| Fortyacres | 77 | Lower Philipstown | Kilclonfert | Tullamore |
| Fortyacres | 100 | Lower Philipstown | Killaderry | Tullamore |
| Foxburrow | 248 | Clonlisk | Templeharry | Roscrea |
| Foxglen (or Garbally) | 45 | Ballyboy | Killoughy | Tullamore |
| Franckfort | 1,315 | Clonlisk | Dunkerrin | Roscrea |
| **Frankford** | Town | Ballyboy | Ballyboy | Parsonstown |
| Frankford | 214 | Ballyboy | Ballyboy | Parsonstown |
| Freagh | 238 | Ballyboy | Ballyboy | Parsonstown |
| Fulough (or MacNahanny) | 438 | Garrycastle | Lusmagh | Parsonstown |
| Galbally | 132 | Clonlisk | Kilmurryely | Roscrea |
| Gallaghers Island | 2 | Garrycastle | Tisaran | Parsonstown |
| Gallen | 625 | Garrycastle | Gallen | Parsonstown |
| Galros | 667 | Garrycastle | Gallen | Parsonstown |
| Galros East | 411 | Eglish | Eglish | Parsonstown |
| Galros West | 362 | Eglish | Eglish | Parsonstown |
| Garbally | 462 | Garrycastle | Reynagh | Parsonstown |
| Garbally | 524 | Ballyboy | Killoughy | Tullamore |
| Garbally (or Foxglen) | 45 | Ballyboy | Killoughy | Tullamore |
| Garr | 1,531 | Warrenstown | Castlejordan | Edenderry |
| Garrycastle | 900 | Garrycastle | Reynagh | Parsonstown |
| Garryduff (or Greenville) | 185 | Kilcoursey | Kilmanaghan | Tullamore |
| Garryhinch | 1,376 | Upper Philipstown | Clonyhurk | Mountmellick |
| Garrymona | 318 | Upper Philipstown | Geashill | Tullamore |
| Garrymore | 277 | Garrycastle | Clonmacnoise | Parsonstown |
| Garrysallagh Glebe | 80 | Eglish | Drumcullen | Parsonstown |
| Gayfield | 75 | Ballycowan | Kilbride | Tullamore |
| **Geashill** | Town | Geashill | Geashill | Tullamore |
| Geashill | 29 | Geashill | Geashill | Tullamore |
| Glascloon | 171 | Ballybritt | Aghancon | Roscrea |
| Glascloon | 236 | Clonlisk | Dunkerrin | Roscrea |
| Glascloon | 48 | Ballybritt | Seirkieran | Roscrea |
| Glasderry Beg | 212 | Clonlisk | Ettagh | Roscrea |
| Glasderry More | 754 | Clonlisk | Ettagh | Roscrea |
| Glaskill | 56 | Clonlisk | Borrisnafarney | Roscrea |
| Glaskill | 547 | Ballycowan | Lynally | Tullamore |
| Glasshouse | 838 | Clonlisk | Kilcomin | Roscrea |
| Glasshouse | 134 | Ballycowan | Rahan | Tullamore |
| Glaster | 606 | Garrycastle | Lusmagh | Parsonstown |
| Glaster and Clonrah | 261 | Garrycastle | Lusmagh | Parsonstown |
| Glebe | 128 | Garrycastle | Clonmacnoise | Parsonstown |
| Glebe | 127 | Garrycastle | Lemanaghan | Parsonstown |
| Glebe | 19 | Ballybritt | Seirkieran | Parsonstown |
| Glebe | 35 | Garrycastle | Wheery or Killagally | Parsonstown |
| Glebe | 22 | Ballybritt | Aghancon | Roscrea |
| Glebe | 60 | Clonlisk | Ettagh | Roscrea |
| Glebe | 52 | Clonlisk | Kilmurryely | Roscrea |
| Glebe East | 195 | Geashill | Geashill | Tullamore |
| Glenacurragh | 349 | Ballybritt | Ettagh | Roscrea |
| Glenafelly | 755 | Ballybritt | Kinnitty | Parsonstown |
| Glenamony Glebe | 333 | Eglish | Eglish | Parsonstown |
| Glendine | 1,221 | Ballybritt | Kinnitty | Parsonstown |
| Glendine | 50 | Clonlisk | Borrisnafarney | Roscrea |
| Glendossaun | 698 | Ballybritt | Kinnitty | Parsonstown |
| Glenduff | 103 | Garrycastle | Lusmagh | Parsonstown |
| Glenletter | 1,138 | Ballybritt | Letterluna | Parsonstown |
| Glennanummer (or Burrow) | 97 | Kilcoursey | Kilcumreragh | Tullamore |
| Glenns | 145 | Eglish | Eglish | Parsonstown |
| Glenregan | 1,798 | Ballybritt | Kinnitty | Parsonstown |
| Glinsk (or Castletown) | 900 | Ballybritt | Kinnitty | Parsonstown |
| Glosterboy and Creggan | 158 | Garrycastle | Gallen | Parsonstown |
| Glyn | 136 | Garrycastle | Gallen | Parsonstown |
| Goldengrove (or Knocknamase) | 580 | Clonlisk | Ettagh | Roscrea |
| Goldsmithslot | 148 | Ballycowan | Rahan | Tullamore |
| Gormagh | 319 | Ballycowan | Durrow | Tullamore |
| Gorraun | 874 | Ballybritt | Aghancon | Roscrea |
| Gorraun | 255 | Clonlisk | Templeharry | Roscrea |
| Gortachallow | 28 | Garrycastle | Lusmagh | Parsonstown |
| Gortacur | 463 | Ballyboy | Killoughy | Tullamore |
| Gortanisky | 83 | Garrycastle | Lusmagh | Parsonstown |
| Gortarevan | 160 | Garrycastle | Lusmagh | Parsonstown |
| Gortavally | 145 | Clonlisk | Kilmurryely | Roscrea |
| Gortcreen | 175 | Clonlisk | Shinrone | Roscrea |
| Gorteen | 644 | Ballybritt | Roscomroe | Roscrea |
| Gorteen | 1,058 | Ballybritt | Roscrea | Roscrea |
| Gorteen | 1,513 | Geashill | Geashill | Tullamore |
| Gorteen | 249 | Lower Philipstown | Killaderry | Tullamore |
| Gorteen | 763 | Kilcoursey | Kilmanaghan | Tullamore |
| Gorteenafoly (or Newhall) | 125 | Clonlisk | Ettagh | Roscrea |
| Gorteenard | 199 | Upper Philipstown | Geashill | Mountmellick |
| Gorteenkeel | 334 | Upper Philipstown | Geashill | Tullamore |
| Gortnacrannagh | 160 | Garrycastle | Lusmagh | Parsonstown |
| Gortnamuck | 349 | Ballyboy | Ballyboy | Parsonstown |
| Gortskeha | 268 | Garrycastle | Lusmagh | Parsonstown |
| Graffan | 135 | Clonlisk | Templeharry | Roscrea |
| Graigue | 703 | Geashill | Geashill | Tullamore |
| Grange | 389 | Ballybritt | Seirkieran | Parsonstown |
| Grange (or Lockclose) | 166 | Geashill | Geashill | Tullamore |
| Grants Island | 11 | Garrycastle | Reynagh | Parsonstown |
| Greatwood (or Mough) | 132 | Ballyboy | Killoughy | Tullamore |
| Greenhills | 399 | Warrenstown | Ballyburly | Edenderry |
| Greenville (or Garryduff) | 185 | Kilcoursey | Kilmanaghan | Tullamore |
| Grogan and Corroe | 375 | Garrycastle | Lemanaghan | Parsonstown |
| Grove (or Cortullagh) | 192 | Garrycastle | Gallen | Parsonstown |
| Grovesend | 38 | Lower Philipstown | Ballyburly | Edenderry |
| Grovesend (or Mooneysland) | 92 | Warrenstown | Ballyburly | Edenderry |
| Guernal | 282 | Garrycastle | Gallen | Parsonstown |
| Gurrawirra | 788 | Garrycastle | Clonmacnoise | Parsonstown |
| Haughtons Island | 13 | Garrycastle | Reynagh | Parsonstown |
| Hawkswood | 485 | Geashill | Geashill | Tullamore |
| Heath | 141 | Clonlisk | Aghancon | Roscrea |
| Heath | 143 | Ballycowan | Lynally | Tullamore |
| Hollimshill | 408 | Ballyboy | Killoughy | Tullamore |
| Hundredacres | 279 | Ballybritt | Letterluna | Parsonstown |
| Huntston | 170 | Garrycastle | Tisaran | Parsonstown |
| Illanc | 1 | Garrycastle | Lusmagh | Parsonstown |
| Illaunnacalliagh | 7 | Garrycastle | Lusmagh | Parsonstown |
| Illaunnarank | 1 | Garrycastle | Lusmagh | Parsonstown |
| Inchanaclea | 14 | Garrycastle | Lusmagh | Parsonstown |
| Incherky | 191 | Garrycastle | Lusmagh | Parsonstown |
| Irishtown | 314 | Ballybritt | Kilcolman | Parsonstown |
| Irishtown | 93 | Clonlisk | Dunkerrin | Roscrea |
| Island | 135 | Ballybritt | Kilcolman | Parsonstown |
| Island | 182 | Clonlisk | Cullenwaine | Roscrea |
| Island | 687 | Lower Philipstown | Killaderry | Tullamore |
| Jonestown | 158 | Warrenstown | Ballymacwilliam | Edenderry |
| Keeloge | 51 | Garrycastle | Wheery or Killagally | Parsonstown |
| Keeloge | 168 | Ballybritt | Roscrea | Roscrea |
| Keeloge | 510 | Clonlisk | Shinrone | Roscrea |
| Keraun | 154 | Ballybritt | Aghancon | Roscrea |
| Kilballyskea | 725 | Clonlisk | Shinrone | Roscrea |
| Kilbeg | 535 | Upper Philipstown | Geashill | Tullamore |
| Kilbride | 192 | Ballycowan | Kilbride | Tullamore |
| Kilbride | 147 | Kilcoursey | Kilbride | Tullamore |
| Kilcamin | 398 | Garrycastle | Gallen | Parsonstown |
| Kilcappagh | 628 | Upper Philipstown | Ballykean | Mountmellick |
| Kilclare | 237 | Ballycowan | Durrow | Tullamore |
| Kilcloncorkry | 244 | Coolestown | Clonsast | Edenderry |
| Kilclonfert | 546 | Lower Philipstown | Kilclonfert | Tullamore |
| Kilcolgan Beg | 377 | Garrycastle | Wheery or Killagally | Parsonstown |
| Kilcolgan More | 260 | Garrycastle | Wheery or Killagally | Parsonstown |
| Kilcollin | 54 | Kilcoursey | Kilbride | Tullamore |
| Kilcolman | 176 | Ballybritt | Kilcolman | Parsonstown |
| Kilcomin | 111 | Clonlisk | Kilcomin | Roscrea |
| Kilcooney | 1,198 | Upper Philipstown | Ballykean | Mountmellick |
| Kilcorbry | 199 | Lower Philipstown | Croghan | Edenderry |
| Kilcoursey | 394 | Kilcoursey | Kilbride | Tullamore |
| Kilcreman | 225 | Ballybritt | Roscrea | Roscrea |
| Kilcruttin | 83 | Ballycowan | Kilbride | Tullamore |
| Kilcumber | 280 | Coolestown | Clonsast | Edenderry |
| Kilcummin | 872 | Garrycastle | Tisaran | Parsonstown |
| Kilcurley | 185 | Kilcoursey | Kilmanaghan | Tullamore |
| Kildangan | 441 | Ballycowan | Durrow | Tullamore |
| Kildrumman | 117 | Coolestown | Clonsast | Edenderry |
| Kilduff | 612 | Lower Philipstown | Kilclonfert | Tullamore |
| Kilfoylan | 672 | Kilcoursey | Kilmanaghan | Tullamore |
| Kilfrancis | 167 | Clonlisk | Shinrone | Roscrea |
| Kilgolan Lower | 175 | Ballyboy | Ballyboy | Parsonstown |
| Kilgolan Upper | 144 | Ballyboy | Ballyboy | Parsonstown |
| Kilgortin | 123 | Ballycowan | Kilbride | Tullamore |
| Kilgortin | 201 | Ballycowan | Rahan | Tullamore |
| Kilkeeran | 502 | Upper Philipstown | Clonyhurk | Mountmellick |
| Killaderry | 322 | Lower Philipstown | Killaderry | Tullamore |
| Killadrown | 157 | Eglish | Drumcullen | Parsonstown |
| Killagally Glebe | 195 | Garrycastle | Wheery or Killagally | Parsonstown |
| Killaghintober | 475 | Garrycastle | Lemanaghan | Parsonstown |
| Killananny | 624 | Ballyboy | Killoughy | Tullamore |
| Killaphort | 292 | Garrycastle | Clonmacnoise | Parsonstown |
| Killaranny | 650 | Ballycowan | Rahan | Tullamore |
| Killarles | 171 | Geashill | Geashill | Tullamore |
| Killaun | 838 | Eglish | Drumcullen | Parsonstown |
| Killavilla | 533 | Ballybritt | Roscrea | Roscrea |
| Killeen | 357 | Coolestown | Monasteroris | Edenderry |
| Killeen | 186 | Upper Philipstown | Clonyhurk | Mountmellick |
| Killeen | 216 | Ballybritt | Aghancon | Roscrea |
| Killeen | 206 | Lower Philipstown | Kilclonfert | Tullamore |
| Killeen and Lugnaboley | 326 | Ballyboy | Ballyboy | Parsonstown |
| Killeenboy | 84 | Garrycastle | Gallen | Parsonstown |
| Killeenbreaghan | 227 | Ballybritt | Kilcolman | Parsonstown |
| Killeenmore | 1,489 | Geashill | Geashill | Tullamore |
| Killeigh | 1,186 | Geashill | Geashill | Tullamore |
| **Killeigh Town** | Town | Geashill | Geashill | Tullamore |
| Killellery | 727 | Geashill | Geashill | Tullamore |
| Killeshil | 200 | Lower Philipstown | Killaderry | Tullamore |
| Killina | 547 | Ballycowan | Rahan | Tullamore |
| Killinure | 232 | Ballybritt | Seirkieran | Parsonstown |
| Killiskea | 223 | Ballycowan | Kilbride | Tullamore |
| Killistristane | 333 | Clonlisk | Ettagh | Roscrea |
| Killoneen | 424 | Lower Philipstown | Kilclonfert | Tullamore |
| Killooly | 1,347 | Ballyboy | Killoughy | Tullamore |
| Killoughy | 260 | Ballyboy | Killoughy | Tullamore |
| Killowen | 1,021 | Warrenstown | Castlejordan | Edenderry |
| Killowney Beg | 103 | Garrycastle | Gallen | Parsonstown |
| Killowney More | 371 | Garrycastle | Gallen | Parsonstown |
| Killurin | 2,463 | Geashill | Geashill | Tullamore |
| Killyon | 60 | Eglish | Drumcullen | Parsonstown |
| Kilmacuddy | 333 | Ballybritt | Letterluna | Parsonstown |
| Kilmaine | 645 | Ballybritt | Seirkieran | Parsonstown |
| Kilmalady Big | 515 | Kilcoursey | Ardnurcher or Horseleap | Tullamore |
| Kilmalady Little | 118 | Kilcoursey | Ardnurcher or Horseleap | Tullamore |
| Kilmalogue | 1,025 | Upper Philipstown | Clonyhurk | Mountmellick |
| Kilmanaghan | 465 | Kilcoursey | Kilmanaghan | Tullamore |
| Kilmeelchon | 391 | Garrycastle | Lusmagh | Parsonstown |
| Kilmochonna | 205 | Garrycastle | Lusmagh | Parsonstown |
| Kilmore | 182 | Ballyboy | Killoughy | Tullamore |
| Kilmucklin | 592 | Kilcoursey | Kilbride | Tullamore |
| Kilmurragh | 132 | Kilcoursey | Kilcumreragh | Tullamore |
| Kilmurry | 750 | Lower Philipstown | Ballycommon | Tullamore |
| Kilmurryely | 306 | Clonlisk | Kilmurryely | Roscrea |
| Kilnabinnia | 137 | Kilcoursey | Kilbride | Tullamore |
| Kilnacarra | 182 | Kilcoursey | Kilbride | Tullamore |
| Kilnagall | 428 | Ballyboy | Ballyboy | Parsonstown |
| Kilnagarnagh | 558 | Garrycastle | Lemanaghan | Parsonstown |
| Kilnaglinny | 332 | Garrycastle | Lusmagh | Parsonstown |
| Kilnagolny | 739 | Garrycastle | Lemanaghan | Parsonstown |
| Kilnalacka | 111 | Clonlisk | Kilcolman | Parsonstown |
| Kilnantoge Lower | 374 | Coolestown | Clonsast | Edenderry |
| Kilnantoge Upper | 417 | Coolestown | Clonsast | Edenderry |
| Kilpatrick | 487 | Ballycowan | Rahan | Tullamore |
| Kiltubbrid Island | 236 | Eglish | Drumcullen | Parsonstown |
| Kincora | 216 | Garrycastle | Wheery or Killagally | Parsonstown |
| Kinnafad | 306 | Warrenstown | Ballymacwilliam | Edenderry |
| **Kinnitty** | Town | Ballybritt | Kinnitty | Parsonstown |
| Kippeenduff | 56 | Kilcoursey | Kilmanaghan | Tullamore |
| Knock | 501 | Ballybritt | Ettagh | Roscrea |
| Knockarley | 643 | Ballybritt | Roscomroe | Roscrea |
| Knockaspur | 155 | Clonlisk | Templeharry | Roscrea |
| Knockballyboy | 1,476 | Geashill | Geashill | Tullamore |
| Knockbane | 84 | Clonlisk | Borrisnafarney | Roscrea |
| Knockbarron | 1,328 | Eglish | Drumcullen | Parsonstown |
| Knockbrack | 144 | Clonlisk | Templeharry | Roscrea |
| Knockdrin | 1,221 | Warrenstown | Castlejordan | Edenderry |
| Knockearlgh | 153 | Clonlisk | Templeharry | Roscrea |
| Knockhill and Drinagh | 436 | Ballyboy | Ballyboy | Parsonstown |
| Knockloughlin | 189 | Ballybritt | Roscrea | Roscrea |
| Knocknahorna | 135 | Garrycastle | Reynagh | Parsonstown |
| Knocknamase (or Goldengrove) | 580 | Clonlisk | Ettagh | Roscrea |
| Kyle | 604 | Ballybritt | Kinnitty | Parsonstown |
| Kylebeg (or Banagher) | 307 | Garrycastle | Reynagh | Parsonstown |
| Kyleboher | 139 | Ballyboy | Ballyboy | Parsonstown |
| Lackagh Beg | 441 | Garrycastle | Lemanaghan | Parsonstown |
| Lackagh More | 579 | Garrycastle | Lemanaghan | Parsonstown |
| Lackan | 264 | Lower Philipstown | Kilclonfert | Tullamore |
| Lackaroe | 151 | Ballybritt | Letterluna | Parsonstown |
| Laughil | 186 | Eglish | Drumcullen | Parsonstown |
| Laughil | 367 | Garrycastle | Lemanaghan | Parsonstown |
| Laughil | 141 | Ballybritt | Roscrea | Roscrea |
| Laurencetown | 120 | Warrenstown | Ballyburly | Edenderry |
| Lavagh | 194 | Garrycastle | Lusmagh | Parsonstown |
| Lavagh Beg | 51 | Garrycastle | Lusmagh | Parsonstown |
| Lea Beg | 3,768 | Garrycastle | Wheery or Killagally | Parsonstown |
| Lea More | 2,746 | Garrycastle | Wheery or Killagally | Parsonstown |
| Leabeg | 751 | Garrycastle | Lemanaghan | Parsonstown |
| Leap | 158 | Ballybritt | Aghancon | Roscrea |
| Lecarrow | 227 | Garrycastle | Clonmacnoise | Parsonstown |
| Lecarrow Glebe (or Britannia) | 157 | Garrycastle | Reynagh | Parsonstown |
| Lehinch | 239 | Kilcoursey | Kilbride | Tullamore |
| Leitra | 1,227 | Garrycastle | Clonmacnoise | Parsonstown |
| Leitrim | 1,313 | Coolestown | Monasteroris | Edenderry |
| Lemanaghan | 2,265 | Garrycastle | Lemanaghan | Parsonstown |
| Lenamarran | 255 | Warrenstown | Ballymacwilliam | Edenderry |
| Letter | 225 | Ballybritt | Letterluna | Parsonstown |
| Lettybrook (or Clooneen) | 331 | Ballybritt | Letterluna | Parsonstown |
| Lisclooney | 785 | Garrycastle | Tisaran | Parsonstown |
| Lisdaly | 196 | Garrycastle | Tisaran | Parsonstown |
| Lisdavuck | 70 | Clonlisk | Castletownely | Roscrea |
| Lisderg (or Bellmount) | 420 | Garrycastle | Tisaran | Parsonstown |
| Lisdermot | 368 | Garrycastle | Wheery or Killagally | Parsonstown |
| Lisduff | 295 | Eglish | Drumcullen | Parsonstown |
| Lisduff | 398 | Clonlisk | Kilcolman | Parsonstown |
| Lisduff | 155 | Garrycastle | Tisaran | Parsonstown |
| Lisheen | 415 | Eglish | Eglish | Parsonstown |
| Lismoney | 680 | Ballybritt | Kinnitty | Parsonstown |
| Lisnageeragh | 507 | Clonlisk | Roscrea | Roscrea |
| Lissanierin | 572 | Ballybritt | Aghancon | Roscrea |
| Lissaniska | 142 | Garrycastle | Tisaran | Parsonstown |
| Lissanisky | 626 | Kilcoursey | Kilbride | Tullamore |
| Lock House Island | 1 | Garrycastle | Gallen | Parsonstown |
| Lockclose (or Grange) | 166 | Geashill | Geashill | Tullamore |
| Longford | 146 | Ballybritt | Roscomroe | Parsonstown |
| Longford Big | 377 | Ballybritt | Seirkieran | Parsonstown |
| Longford Little | 80 | Ballybritt | Seirkieran | Parsonstown |
| Loughan | 702 | Clonlisk | Finglas | Roscrea |
| Loughaun | 552 | Ballycowan | Durrow | Tullamore |
| Loughderry and Derymullin | 369 | Eglish | Eglish | Parsonstown |
| Loughroe | 234 | Ballycowan | Rahan | Tullamore |
| Loughwheelion (or Moneyadda) | 246 | Clonlisk | Aghancon | Roscrea |
| Lower Heath | 174 | Eglish | Eglish | Parsonstown |
| Lowerton Beg | 360 | Ballyboy | Killoughy | Tullamore |
| Lowerton More | 457 | Ballyboy | Killoughy | Tullamore |
| Loyer | 162 | Clonlisk | Castletownely | Roscrea |
| Lug | 99 | Ballycowan | Durrow | Tullamore |
| Lugamarla | 320 | Ballyboy | Killoughy | Tullamore |
| Luganiska | 331 | Ballyboy | Ballyboy | Parsonstown |
| Lugglass | 145 | Ballyboy | Killoughy | Tullamore |
| Lugmore | 67 | Geashill | Geashill | Tullamore |
| Lugnaboley & Killeen | 326 | Ballyboy | Ballyboy | Parsonstown |
| Lumcloon | 2,248 | Garrycastle | Gallen | Parsonstown |
| Lumville | 346 | Coolestown | Monasteroris | Edenderry |
| Lurgan | 444 | Kilcoursey | Kilmanaghan | Tullamore |
| Lynally Glebe | 528 | Ballycowan | Lynally | Tullamore |
| MacNahanny (or Ashgrove) | 389 | Garrycastle | Lusmagh | Parsonstown |
| MacNahanny (or Fulough) | 438 | Garrycastle | Lusmagh | Parsonstown |
| Macoghlans Island | 25 | Garrycastle | Reynagh | Parsonstown |
| Magherabane | 244 | Garrycastle | Gallen | Parsonstown |
| Magherabane | 333 | Ballybritt | Letterluna | Parsonstown |
| Magheramore | 93 | Clonlisk | Kilmurryely | Roscrea |
| Magheranaskeagh | 276 | Upper Philipstown | Clonyhurk | Mountmellick |
| Magherareagh | 160 | Clonlisk | Kilmurryely | Roscrea |
| Marymount | 161 | Ballybritt | Aghancon | Roscrea |
| Meelaghans | 1,386 | Geashill | Geashill | Tullamore |
| Meenwaun | 68 | Garrycastle | Reynagh | Parsonstown |
| Mill Grove | 99 | Coolestown | Clonsast | Edenderry |
| Millbrook | 112 | Geashill | Ballykean | Tullamore |
| Milltown | 191 | Garrycastle | Reynagh | Parsonstown |
| Milltown | 252 | Clonlisk | Shinrone | Roscrea |
| Minus Island | 69 | Garrycastle | Gallen | Parsonstown |
| Moanvane | 1,068 | Upper Philipstown | Ballykean | Mountmellick |
| Monasteroris | 1,017 | Coolestown | Monasteroris | Edenderry |
| Moneadda (or Loughwheelion) | 246 | Clonlisk | Aghancon | Roscrea |
| Moneenagunnell | 121 | Garrycastle | Tisaran | Parsonstown |
| Moneenderg | 74 | Eglish | Drumcullen | Parsonstown |
| Money | 1,046 | Ballyboy | Ballyboy | Parsonstown |
| **Moneygall** | Town | Clonlisk | Cullenwaine | Roscrea |
| Moneygall | 663 | Clonlisk | Cullenwaine | Roscrea |
| Moneyguyneen | 183 | Ballybritt | Letterluna | Parsonstown |
| Moneyshingaun | 54 | Clonlisk | Kilmurryely | Roscrea |
| Mooneysland (or Grovesend) | 92 | Warrenstown | Ballyburly | Edenderry |
| Moorock | 973 | Garrycastle | Lemanaghan | Parsonstown |
| Mossfield | 395 | Ballybritt | Seirkieran | Parsonstown |
| Mough (or Greatwood) | 132 | Ballyboy | Killoughy | Tullamore |
| Mountarmstrong | 54 | Ballycowan | Rahan | Tullamore |
| **Mountbolus** | Town | Ballyboy | Killoughy | Tullamore |
| Mountcarteret (or Feeghroe) | 52 | Garrycastle | Reynagh | Parsonstown |
| Mountheaton | 449 | Clonlisk | Corbally | Roscrea |
| Mountheaton | 237 | Clonlisk | Dunkerrin | Roscrea |
| Mounthenry | 55 | Eglish | Eglish | Parsonstown |
| Mountlucas (or Drumcaw) | 1,250 | Coolestown | Ballynakill | Edenderry |
| Mountpleasant | 677 | Ballyboy | Killoughy | Tullamore |
| Mountwilson | 416 | Warrenstown | Ballymacwilliam | Edenderry |
| Moyally | 343 | Kilcoursey | Kilmanaghan | Tullamore |
| Moyclare | 717 | Garrycastle | Wheery or Killagally | Parsonstown |
| Moynure | 112 | Clonlisk | Kilmurryely | Roscrea |
| Moynure | 156 | Clonlisk | Roscrea | Roscrea |
| Moystown Demesne | 578 | Garrycastle | Tisaran | Parsonstown |
| Muckinish | 48 | Garrycastle | Lusmagh | Parsonstown |
| Mucklagh | 370 | Ballycowan | Lynally | Tullamore |
| Mucklone East | 106 | Clonlisk | Kilcomin | Roscrea |
| Mucklone West | 268 | Clonlisk | Kilcomin | Roscrea |
| Muiniagh | 217 | Ballycowan | Kilbride | Tullamore |
| Mullaghakaraun | 261 | Garrycastle | Reynagh | Parsonstown |
| Mullaghakaraun Bog | 74 | Garrycastle | Reynagh | Parsonstown |
| Mullagharush | 202 | Lower Philipstown | Kilclonfert | Tullamore |
| Mullaghcrohy | 249 | Ballyboy | Killoughy | Tullamore |
| Mullalough (or Cavemount) | 778 | Lower Philipstown | Kilclonfert | Tullamore |
| Mullanafawnia | 173 | Eglish | Drumcullen | Parsonstown |
| Murragh | 400 | Ballycowan | Rahan | Tullamore |
| Nadneagh | 109 | Clonlisk | Kilcolman | Parsonstown |
| Nahana | 610 | Coolestown | Clonsast | Edenderry |
| Newhall (or Gorteenafoly) | 125 | Clonlisk | Ettagh | Roscrea |
| **Newtown** | Town | Garrycastle | Lusmagh | Parsonstown |
| Newtown | 822 | Coolestown | Castlejordan | Edenderry |
| Newtown | 319 | Garrycastle | Lusmagh | Parsonstown |
| Newtown | 1,199 | Ballybritt | Roscomroe | Parsonstown |
| Newtown | 125 | Clonlisk | Kilcomin | Roscrea |
| Newtown | 812 | Geashill | Geashill | Tullamore |
| Newtown | 510 | Kilcoursey | Kilcumreragh | Tullamore |
| Newtown | 249 | Kilcoursey | Kilmanaghan | Tullamore |
| Newtown | 413 | Ballycowan | Rahan | Tullamore |
| Noggusboy | 687 | Garrycastle | Gallen | Parsonstown |
| Noggusduff | 313 | Garrycastle | Gallen | Parsonstown |
| Oakleypark | 753 | Ballybritt | Seirkieran | Parsonstown |
| Oldcroghan | 649 | Lower Philipstown | Croghan | Edenderry |
| Oldtown | 443 | Lower Philipstown | Killaderry | Tullamore |
| Oldtown | 130 | Ballycowan | Rahan | Tullamore |
| Osierbrook | 108 | Ballybritt | Seirkieran | Parsonstown |
| Oughter | 494 | Garrycastle | Lemanaghan | Parsonstown |
| Ouris | 144 | Clonlisk | Dunkerrin | Roscrea |
| Pallas | 120 | Ballyboy | Killoughy | Tullamore |
| Pallaspark | 279 | Ballyboy | Killoughy | Tullamore |
| Park | 149 | Ballyboy | Ballyboy | Parsonstown |
| Park | 587 | Garrycastle | Gallen | Parsonstown |
| Parkaree (or Boherfadda) | 285 | Garrycastle | Lemanaghan | Parsonstown |
| Parkmeen | 151 | Coolestown | Clonsast | Edenderry |
| Parkmore | 230 | Eglish | Eglish | Parsonstown |
| Parkwood | 234 | Kilcoursey | Kilcumreragh | Tullamore |
| **Parsonstown (or Birr)** | Town | Ballybritt | Birr | Parsonstown |
| Pass | 198 | Eglish | Drumcullen | Parsonstown |
| **Philipstown** | Town | Lower Philipstown | Killaderry | Tullamore |
| Pigeonhouse | 68 | Geashill | Geashill | Tullamore |
| Pigeonpark | 626 | Ballybritt | Letterluna | Parsonstown |
| Pigeonpark (or Scrub) | 535 | Upper Philipstown | Geashill | Edenderry |
| Pollagh | 907 | Garrycastle | Lemanaghan | Parsonstown |
| Pollaghaglass | 52 | Coolestown | Clonsast | Edenderry |
| Pollaghnagraigue | 182 | Coolestown | Clonsast | Edenderry |
| Pollaghoole | 148 | Garrycastle | Reynagh | Parsonstown |
| Pollduff | 888 | Ballybritt | Roscomroe | Parsonstown |
| **Portarlington** | Town | Upper Philipstown | Clonyhurk | Mountmellick |
| Portavrolla (or Curraghavarna) | 235 | Garrycastle | Reynagh | Parsonstown |
| **Puttaghan** | Town | Ballycowan | Kilbride | Tullamore |
| Puttaghan | 486 | Ballycowan | Kilbride | Tullamore |
| Puttaghan | 114 | Lower Philipstown | Kilclonfert | Tullamore |
| Rabbitburrow | 310 | Ballycowan | Rahan | Tullamore |
| Raghra | 399 | Garrycastle | Clonmacnoise | Parsonstown |
| Rahan Demesne | 391 | Ballycowan | Rahan | Tullamore |
| Raheen | 296 | Upper Philipstown | Ballykean | Mountmellick |
| Raheen | 649 | Kilcoursey | Kilbride | Tullamore |
| Raheenakeeran | 1,340 | Upper Philipstown | Geashill | Tullamore |
| Raheenbeg | 352 | Upper Philipstown | Geashill | Tullamore |
| Raheenduff | 396 | Geashill | Geashill | Tullamore |
| Raheenglass | 404 | Eglish | Drumcullen | Parsonstown |
| Raheenmeel | 156 | Ballyboy | Ballyboy | Parsonstown |
| Raheenmore | 136 | Lower Philipstown | Kilclonfert | Tullamore |
| Rashinagh | 462 | Garrycastle | Lemanaghan | Parsonstown |
| Rath | 161 | Clonlisk | Cullenwaine | Roscrea |
| Rath Beg | 1,155 | Clonlisk | Kilcolman | Parsonstown |
| Rath More | 792 | Clonlisk | Kilcolman | Parsonstown |
| Rathcahill | 186 | Clonlisk | Kilmurryely | Roscrea |
| Rathclonbrackan (or Rathvilla) | 720 | Coolestown | Monasteroris | Edenderry |
| Rathcobican | 675 | Warrenstown | Ballymacwilliam | Edenderry |
| Rathdrum | 735 | Lower Philipstown | Ballycommon | Tullamore |
| Rathenny | 258 | Clonlisk | Cullenwaine | Roscrea |
| Rathfeston | 966 | Upper Philipstown | Geashill | Tullamore |
| Rathgibbon North | 226 | Eglish | Drumcullen | Parsonstown |
| Rathgibbon South | 332 | Eglish | Drumcullen | Parsonstown |
| Rathgreedan | 151 | Coolestown | Monasteroris | Edenderry |
| Rathkeeragan | 106 | Ballyboy | Killoughy | Tullamore |
| Rathlihen | 409 | Ballyboy | Killoughy | Tullamore |
| Rathlumber | 389 | Coolestown | Monasteroris | Edenderry |
| Rathmore | 216 | Coolestown | Monasteroris | Edenderry |
| Rathmore | 248 | Upper Philipstown | Clonyhurk | Mountmellick |
| Rathmount | 38 | Eglish | Drumcullen | Parsonstown |
| Rathmoyle | 343 | Warrenstown | Ballyburly | Edenderry |
| Rathmoyle | 102 | Clonlisk | Borrisnafarney | Roscrea |
| Rathmurragh | 184 | Ballyboy | Killoughy | Tullamore |
| Rathrobin | 991 | Ballyboy | Killoughy | Tullamore |
| Rathure North | 273 | Eglish | Drumcullen | Parsonstown |
| Rathure South | 209 | Eglish | Drumcullen | Parsonstown |
| Rathvilla (or Rathclonbrackan) | 720 | Coolestown | Monasteroris | Edenderry |
| Ridgemount (or Ballybrackan) | 513 | Ballyboy | Ballyboy | Parsonstown |
| Rin | 661 | Garrycastle | Gallen | Parsonstown |
| Riverlyons (or Clonarrow) | 1,897 | Lower Philipstown | Kilclonfert | Tullamore |
| Rhode | 175 | Warrenstown | Ballyburly | Edenderry |
| Rogerstown | 355 | Coolestown | Monasteroris | Edenderry |
| Rooaun | 74 | Ballybritt | Roscrea | Roscrea |
| Roosk | 244 | Warrenstown | Ballymacwilliam | Edenderry |
| Roscomroe | 414 | Ballybritt | Roscomroe | Parsonstown |
| Roscore Demesne | 356 | Ballycowan | Rahan | Tullamore |
| Rosdrehid | 116 | Clonlisk | Cullenwaine | Roscrea |
| Rosfaraghan | 422 | Garrycastle | Wheery or Killagally | Parsonstown |
| Rosnagowloge (or Tirinchinan) | 218 | Ballycowan | Kilbride | Tullamore |
| Ross | 147 | Eglish | Eglish | Parsonstown |
| Ross | 777 | Ballycowan | Lynally | Tullamore |
| Rossamine | 193 | Clonlisk | Shinrone | Roscrea |
| Roundhill | 82 | Eglish | Drumcullen | Parsonstown |
| Rusheen | 130 | Clonlisk | Kilcomin | Roscrea |
| Russagh | 363 | Kilcoursey | Ardnurcher or Horseleap | Tullamore |
| Russellspenn | 113 | Eglish | Drumcullen | Parsonstown |
| Rutland | 171 | Clonlisk | Kilcomin | Roscrea |
| Scarry | 62 | Ballyboy | Ballyboy | Parsonstown |
| Sconce | 72 | Ballyboy | Killoughy | Tullamore |
| Scorduff | 231 | Clonlisk | Kilmurryely | Roscrea |
| Screggan | 335 | Ballycowan | Lynally | Tullamore |
| Scrub (or Pigeonpark) | 333 | Upper Philipstown | Geashill | Edenderry |
| **Seefin** | Town | Ballybritt | Birr | Parsonstown |
| Seefin | 143 | Ballybritt | Birr | Parsonstown |
| Shanacloon | 107 | Eglish | Eglish | Parsonstown |
| Shanballynakill | 48 | Kilcoursey | Kilmanaghan | Tullamore |
| Shanderry | 1,020 | Upper Philipstown | Clonyhurk | Mountmellick |
| **Shannon Harbor** | Town | Garrycastle | Gallen | Parsonstown |
| Shannon Navigation | 1 | Garrycastle | Gallen | Parsonstown |
| **Shannonbridge** | Town | Garrycastle | Clonmacnoise | Parsonstown |
| Shanvally | 107 | Ballycowan | Lynally | Tullamore |
| Sharavogue | 472 | Clonlisk | Kilcolman | Parsonstown |
| Shean | 695 | Coolestown | Monasteroris | Edenderry |
| Shelbourne | 35 | Garrycastle | Lusmagh | Parsonstown |
| Sheskin | 517 | Ballybritt | Letterluna | Parsonstown |
| **Shinrone** | Town | Clonlisk | Shinrone | Roscrea |
| Shinrone | 724 | Clonlisk | Shinrone | Roscrea |
| Silverhill | 124 | Clonlisk | Cullenwaine | Roscrea |
| Skehanagh | 123 | Garrycastle | Wheery or Killagally | Parsonstown |
| Smithstown | 128 | Garrycastle | Gallen | Parsonstown |
| Snugborough | 58 | Clonlisk | Cullenwaine | Roscrea |
| Snugborough | 67 | Clonlisk | Kilmurryely | Roscrea |
| Spink | 191 | Ballybritt | Letterluna | Parsonstown |
| Spollanstown | 362 | Ballycowan | Kilbride | Tullamore |
| Springfield | 338 | Eglish | Drumcullen | Parsonstown |
| Springfield (or Ballyhugh) | 185 | Coolestown | Ballynakill | Edenderry |
| Springpark | 262 | Garrycastle | Lemanaghan | Parsonstown |
| Srah | 262 | Warrenstown | Ballyburly | Edenderry |
| Srah | 453 | Ballycowan | Kilbride | Tullamore |
| Srahanbregagh | 343 | Clonlisk | Ettagh | Roscrea |
| Sranure | 366 | Upper Philipstown | Ballykean | Mountmellick |
| Still Island | 2 | Garrycastle | Lusmagh | Parsonstown |
| Stonehouse | 270 | Warrenstown | Castlejordan | Edenderry |
| Stonestown | 2,485 | Garrycastle | Gallen | Parsonstown |
| Straduff | 582 | Garrycastle | Lemanaghan | Parsonstown |
| Strawberryhill (or Drishoge) | 182 | Garrycastle | Gallen | Parsonstown |
| Streamstown | 570 | Eglish | Drumcullen | Parsonstown |
| Streamstown | 59 | Garrycastle | Reynagh | Parsonstown |
| Tara | 518 | Ballycowan | Durrow | Tullamore |
| Temora | 163 | Ballyboy | Ballyboy | Parsonstown |
| The Walk | 330 | Ballybritt | Kinnitty | Parsonstown |
| Thomastown | 330 | Warrenstown | Ballymacwilliam | Edenderry |
| Thomastown Demesne | 720 | Eglish | Drumcullen | Parsonstown |
| Thornwell | 303 | Warrenstown | Ballymacwilliam | Edenderry |
| Timolin | 686 | Garrycastle | Reynagh | Parsonstown |
| Timolin (or Derryholmes and Derryharan) | 533 | Garrycastle | Tisaran | Parsonstown |
| Tinacrannagh | 375 | Upper Philipstown | Clonyhurk | Mountmellick |
| Tinamuck East | 369 | Kilcoursey | Kilmanaghan | Tullamore |
| Tinamuck South | 210 | Kilcoursey | Kilmanaghan | Tullamore |
| Tinamuck West | 489 | Kilcoursey | Kilmanaghan | Tullamore |
| Tinnacross | 67 | Eglish | Drumcullen | Parsonstown |
| Tinnycross (or Ballynasrah) | 510 | Ballycowan | Kilbride | Tullamore |
| Tirinchinan (or Rosnagowloge) | 218 | Ballycowan | Kilbride | Tullamore |
| Tober | 289 | Kilcoursey | Kilmanaghan | Tullamore |
| Toberdaly | 1,552 | Warrenstown | Castlejordan | Edenderry |
| Toberleheen | 350 | Geashill | Geashill | Tullamore |
| Toberronan | 139 | Lower Philipstown | Killaderry | Tullamore |
| Togher | 350 | Lower Philipstown | Ballyburly | Edenderry |
| Togher | 140 | Garrycastle | Lemanaghan | Parsonstown |
| Tonagh | 33 | Clonlisk | Kilmurryely | Roscrea |
| Tonlemone | 505 | Garrycastle | Gallen | Parsonstown |
| Toora | 930 | Clonlisk | Shinrone | Roscrea |
| Tooreen | 179 | Warrenstown | Ballyburly | Edenderry |
| Tooreen | 291 | Upper Philipstown | Geashill | Tullamore |
| Townparks | 824 | Ballybritt | Birr | Parsonstown |
| Townparks | 1,198 | Lower Philipstown | Killaderry | Tullamore |
| Trascan | 1,481 | Upper Philipstown | Clonyhurk | Mountmellick |
| Tubbrid | 327 | Clonlisk | Kilmurryely | Roscrea |
| Tulla and Crumlin | 822 | Ballybritt | Kinnitty | Parsonstown |
| Tullaghbeg | 980 | Garrycastle | Clonmacnoise | Parsonstown |
| **Tullamore** | Town | Ballycowan | Kilbride | Tullamore |
| Tullamore | 411 | Ballycowan | Kilbride | Tullamore |
| Tullaroe | 191 | Ballybritt | Ettagh | Roscrea |
| Tully | 274 | Kilcoursey | Ardnurcher or Horseleap | Tullamore |
| Tully | 24 | Kilcoursey | Kilmanaghan | Tullamore |
| Tullybeg | 213 | Ballycowan | Rahan | Tullamore |
| Tullymorerahan | 122 | Ballycowan | Rahan | Tullamore |
| Tullymorerahan (or Derrynanagh) | 119 | Ballycowan | Rahan | Tullamore |
| Tullynisk (or Woodfield) | 624 | Eglish | Eglish | Parsonstown |
| Tumbeagh | 562 | Garrycastle | Lemanaghan | Parsonstown |
| Turnersglaster | 73 | Garrycastle | Lusmagh | Parsonstown |
| Turraun | 979 | Garrycastle | Wheery or Killagally | Parsonstown |
| Turret Island | 1 | Garrycastle | Clonmacnoise | Parsonstown |
| Urney | 484 | Upper Philipstown | Ballykean | Mountmellick |
| Vicarstown | 141 | Garrycastle | Wheery or Killagally | Parsonstown |
| Viewmount (or Courtland) | 24 | Ballybritt | Seirkieran | Parsonstown |
| Walsh Island | 700 | Upper Philipstown | Geashill | Edenderry |
| Wheery | 40 | Garrycastle | Wheery or Killagally | Parsonstown |
| Wheery | 40 | Garrycastle | Wheery or Killagally | Parsonstown |
| Whigsborough | 985 | Eglish | Eglish | Parsonstown |
| Wilton | 164 | Kilcoursey | Kilmanaghan | Tullamore |
| Wood | 295 | Warrenstown | Ballyburly | Edenderry |
| Wood of O | 774 | Lower Philipstown | Ballycommon | Tullamore |
| Woodfield (or Curraghboy) | 624 | Kilcoursey | Kilbride | Tullamore |
| Woodfield (or Tullynisk) | 624 | Eglish | Eglish | Parsonstown |
