= Kingdom of Uí Failghe =

Kingdom in east-central Ireland (to 16th century)

The kingdom of Uí Fháilghe, Uí Failge (early spelling) or Uíbh Fhailí (modern spelling), (pronounced [iːvʲ ˈalʲiː]) was a Gaelic-Irish kingdom which existed to 1550, the name of which (though not the territory) is preserved in the name of County Offaly (Irish: Contae Uíbh Fhailí), Ireland.

County Offaly was constructed from elements of a number of ancient Irish Kingdoms of which Uí Failghe was one amongst such as Mide (present day west Offaly) and Munster (present day south Offaly). In modern territorial boundaries the kingdom today would correspond with County Offaly east of Tullamore, western parts of Kildare and parts of north east Laois. The name was also retained in the names of two baronies in County Kildare that formed part of the kingdom, Offaly (Ophaley) East and Offaly (Ophaley) West.

== Background ==
Uí Failghe may have existed as a kingdom from the early historic era. It takes its name from the legendary king Rus Failge (fl. AD 507–514). It successfully fought off encroachments by the Uí Néill, the Eóganachta, and the Normans however with loss of territories. "The traditions of warfare in the fifth century between Ui Neill and Laigin in Brega and Mide ... [show] the Ui Failgi certainly suffered most material damage through the loss of territory in Offaly and Westmeath".

From the mid-11th century its ruling dynasty adopted the surname Ua Conchobhair Failghe (modern spelling: Ua Conchúir Fhailí) or O Connor Faly (they were unrelated to the other notable Ua Conchobhair dynasties of Connacht and Kerry). Their seat was originally in Rathangan but moved to Daingean with the Norman arrival. On the death of the last de facto king, Brian mac Chathaoir Uí Chonchúir Fhailí, about 1556, the Parliament of Ireland passed the Settlement of Laois and Offaly Act 1556 and Ui Failghe was divided between Queen's County, King's County and County Kildare during one of the Plantations of Ireland. Upon Irish independence in 1922, 'King's County' was renamed County Offaly in commemoration of Uí Failghe.

== Additional Information ==
Beyond its territorial boundaries, Uí Fháilghe played a notable role in the political balance of Leinster. Its rulers frequently allied or clashed with neighboring kingdoms such as Uí Dúnlainge and Uí Cheinnselaig, shaping the regional power structure for centuries. The kingdom was also a custodian of Gaelic law and custom, with local brehons administering justice under the ancient Brehon Laws. Patronage of poets, historians, and church foundations contributed to the preservation of Laigin cultural identity, even in the face of Norman and later Tudor pressures.

The territory of Uí Fháilghe contained several early Christian monastic foundations, some of which became influential centers of learning. Monasteries such as Clonbullogue and Monasteroris are believed to have been important hubs for manuscript production and ecclesiastical training. These religious communities maintained ties with other monastic settlements in Ireland, fostering both cultural and political networks that helped the ruling dynasty sustain legitimacy.

Geographically, Uí Fháilghe’s location between the Slieve Bloom Mountains and the River Barrow gave it natural defensive advantages. The ruling O’Connor Faly clan utilized ringforts, earthworks, and later tower houses to protect their lands from incursions. These defenses proved critical during periods of intensified conflict, particularly during Norman expansion in the 12th and 13th centuries and the Tudor military campaigns of the 16th century. Despite eventual conquest, the memory of these defensive efforts endured in local oral history and folklore.

== Description ==
Uí Failge, according to O’Donovan

The old territory of Offaly is described by O'Donovan in his Ordnance Survey letters. O'Donovan notes the territory of Ui Failghe, or Ophaley, comprising the baronies of: Geshill, Upper and Lower Philipstown, Warrenstown, and Collestown all in King's County; Ophaley (or Offaley) in County Kildare; Portnahinch and Tinahinch in Queen's County. O'Donovan cites O'Heerin as giving that Offaly was originally subdivided into seven cantreds: Tuath Geisille (Geashill); Hy-Regan (Tinahinch); Clann-Maoilughra (Upper Philipstown and Portnahinch); Clar Colgain (Lower Philipstown); Tuath-Maighe or Tethmoy (Coolestown and Warrenstown); Magh Aoife, or Fearann Uí Mhurcháin, (northern half of the Ophaley); Tuath Leighe (southern half of Ophaley).

This gives the kingdom an approximately triangular shape, with a southwest corner in the Slieve Bloom Mountains, a southeast corner at Dún Ailinne, and the River Boyne and its tributaries (Milltown River, Yellow River) marking its northern border.

Keating cites the following family branches as belonging to the Ó Conchubhar Fhailghe: "Ó Caomhánaigh, Ó Tuathalaigh, Ó Branaigh, Mac Giolla Phádraig, Ó Duinn, Ó Díomasaigh, Ó Duibhir, Ó Conchúir (of Offaly and North Wexford), Muintear Riain."

== See also ==
- Kings of Ui Failghe
- Irish kings
- Gaelic Ireland
- Loígis
