= Urney =

Urney may refer to:

- Urney, County Cavan, a civil parish and townland in County Cavan, Ireland
- Urney, County Donegal, a civil parish in County Donegal, Ireland
- Urney, a townland in County Offaly, Ireland
- Urney, County Tyrone, a civil parish and townland in County Tyrone, Northern Ireland
