= John Pellisier =

Irish academic (1703–1781)

John Pellisier (25 April 1703 – 6 January 1781) was an Irish academic.

Pellisier was born in Clonygowan and educated at Trinity College Dublin. He became a Fellow of TCD in 1727 and Regius Professor of Divinity there in 1746. In 1752 he became Rector of Ardstraw.
