= R424 road (Ireland) =

Irish regional road

Coordinates: 53.147698°N 7.100379°W

R424 road
- Bóthar R424

Route information
- Length: 5.2 km (3.2 mi)

Major junctions
- From: R420 Lea Cross
- Enters County Kildare; Crosses River Barrow and Grand Canal
- To: R445 Monasterevin

Location
- Country: Ireland

Highway system
- Roads in Ireland; Motorways; Primary; Secondary; Regional

The R424 road is a regional road in Ireland, located in County Laois and County Kildare.
