= Upper Philipstown =

Upper Philipstown An Daingean Uachtarach (Irish)
- Barony
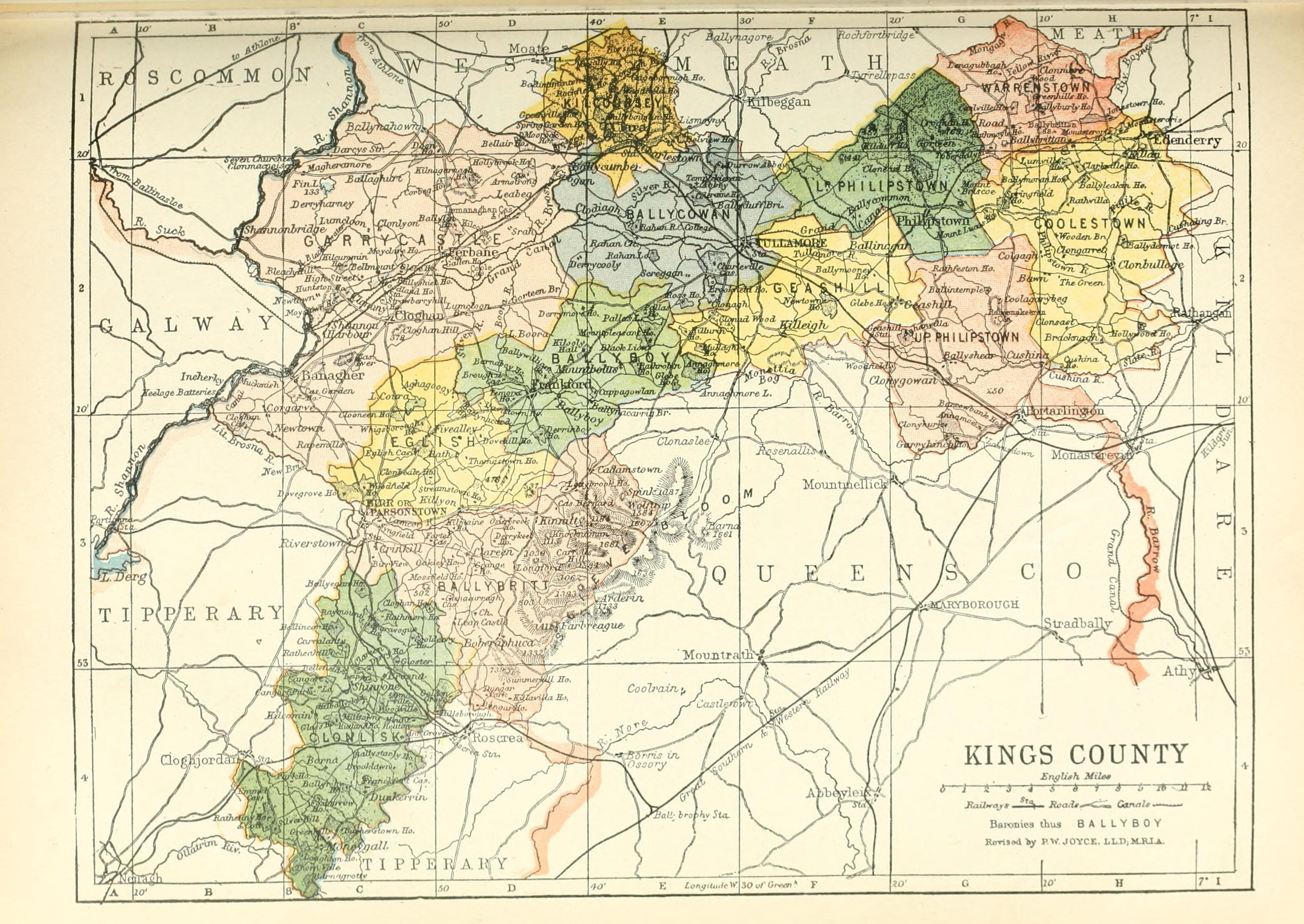
- Baronies of County Offaly. Upper Philipstown is shaded peach.
- Sovereign state: Ireland
- County: Offaly

Area
  - Total: 150.09 km^{2} (57.95 sq mi)

Upper Philipstown (Irish: An Daingean Uachtarach) is a barony in County Offaly (formerly King's County), Ireland.

== Etymology ==
The name Upper Philipstown is derived from Philipstown, the former name of Daingean.

== Location ==
Upper Philipstown is located in northeast County Offaly, north of the River Barrow.

== History ==
As Viscount Clanmalier the Ó Diomasaigh (O'Dempsey) held part of Upper Philipstown, which was roughly formed from the tuath, Ferann Clainne Diarmata. The original Philipstown barony was split into lower and upper by 1807.

== List of settlements ==
Below is a list of settlements in Upper Philipstown:

- Clonygowan
- Portarlington (northern part)
- Walsh Island
