= Lower Philipstown =

Lower Philipstown An Daingean Íochtarach (Irish)
- Barony
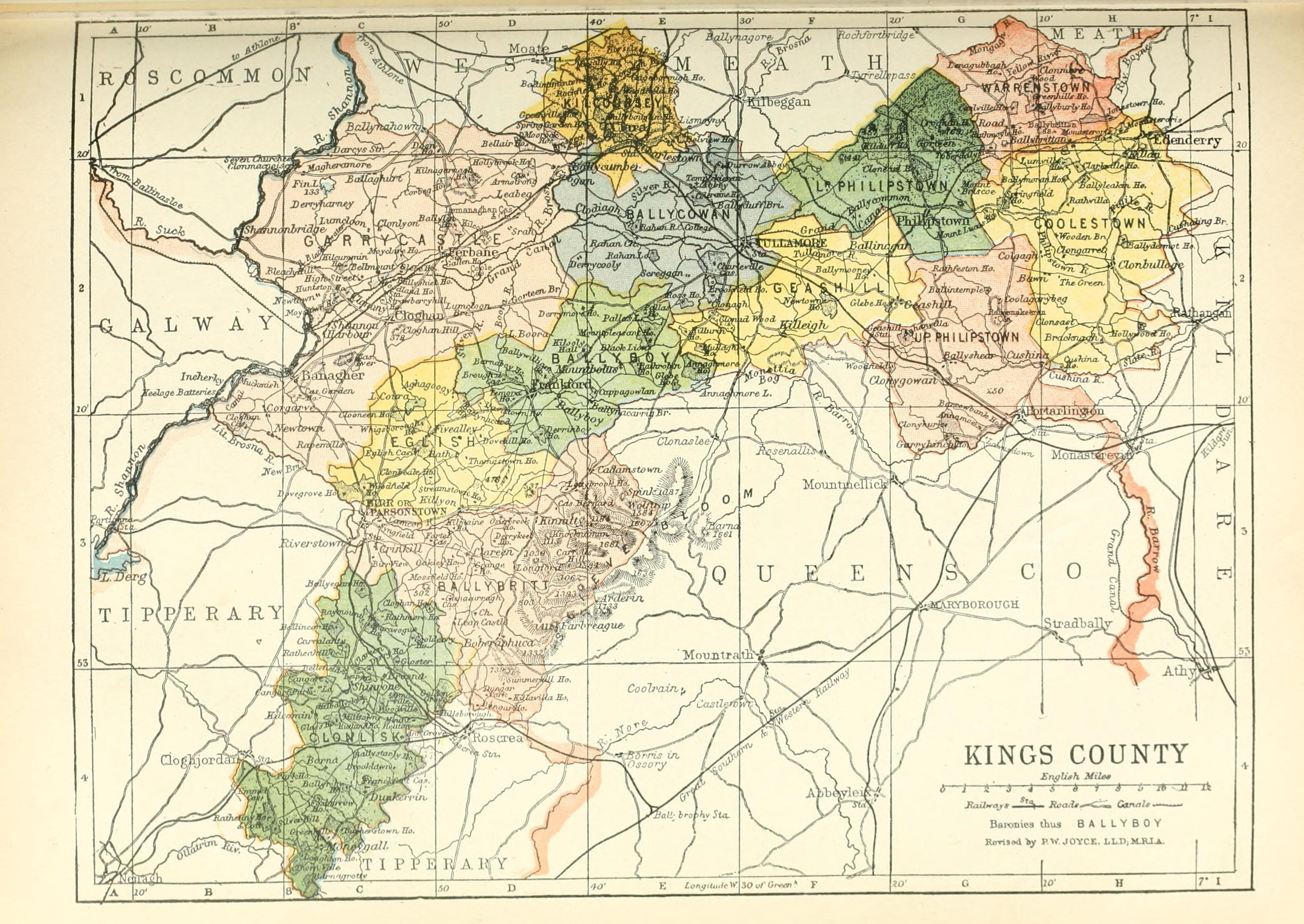
- Baronies of County Offaly. Lower Philipstown is shaded dark green.
- Sovereign state: Ireland
- County: Offaly

Area
  - Total: 124.11 km^{2} (47.92 sq mi)

Lower Philipstown (Irish: An Daingean Íochtarach) is a barony in County Offaly (formerly King's County), Ireland.

== Etymology ==
The name Lower Philipstown is derived from Philipstown, the former name of Daingean.

== Location ==
Lower Philipstown is located in northeast County Offaly and contains Croghan Hill and part of the Bog of Allen.

== History ==
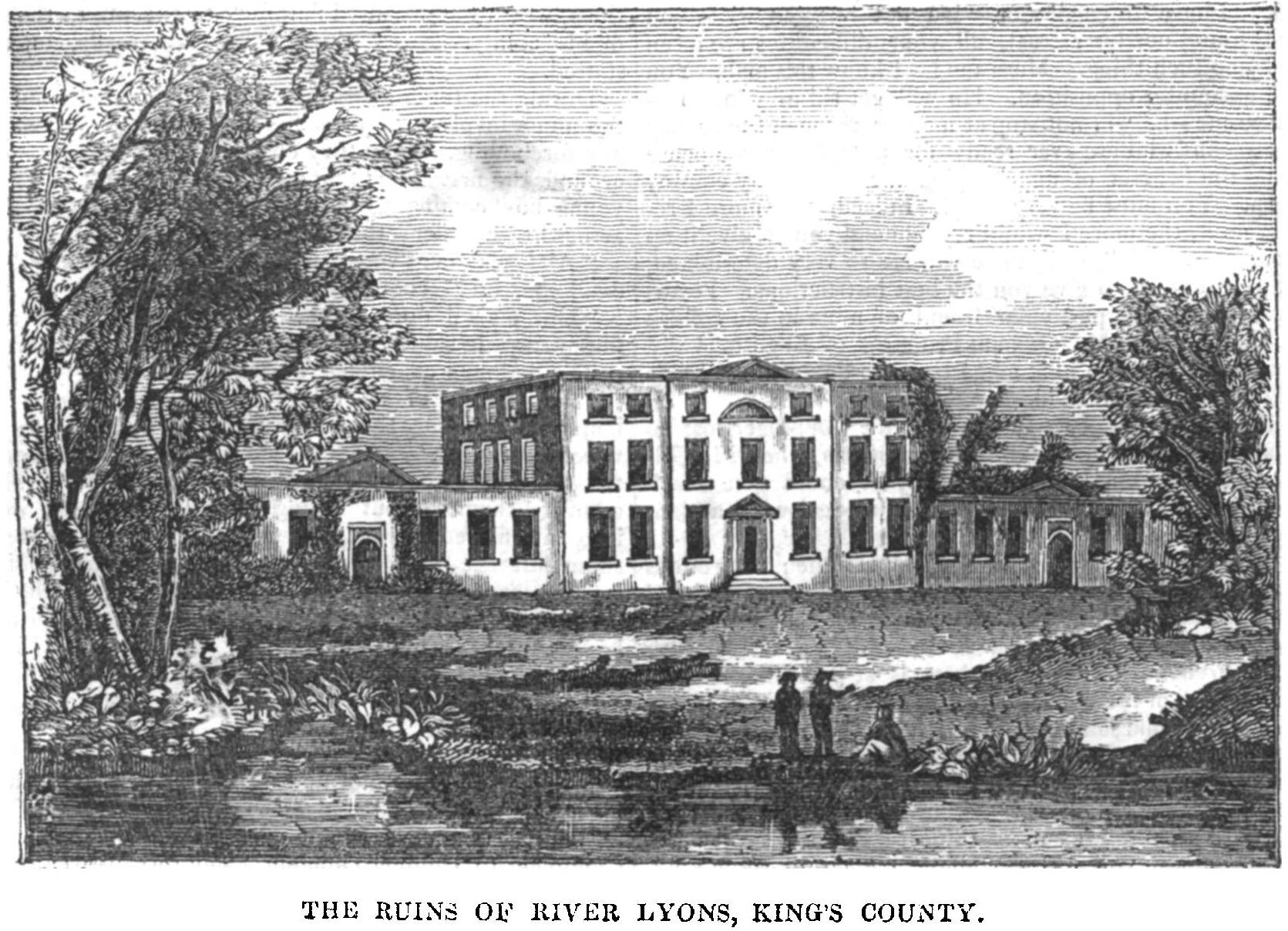
The ruins of River Lyons, King's County, Dublin Penny Journal 1835

Lower Philipstown was roughly formed from the ancient tuaths; Tuath Rátha Droma and Tuath Cruacháin of the Uí Failge (O'Connor Faly). Ó hAonghusa (O'Hennessy) alongside Ó hUallacháin (O'Houlihan) are cited here as chiefs of Clan Colgan, near Croghan Hill. The original Philipstown barony was split into upper and lower by 1807.

== List of settlements ==
Below is a list of settlements in Lower Philipstown:

- Croghan
- Daingean
