= Geashill (barony) =

Geashill Géisill (Irish)
- Barony
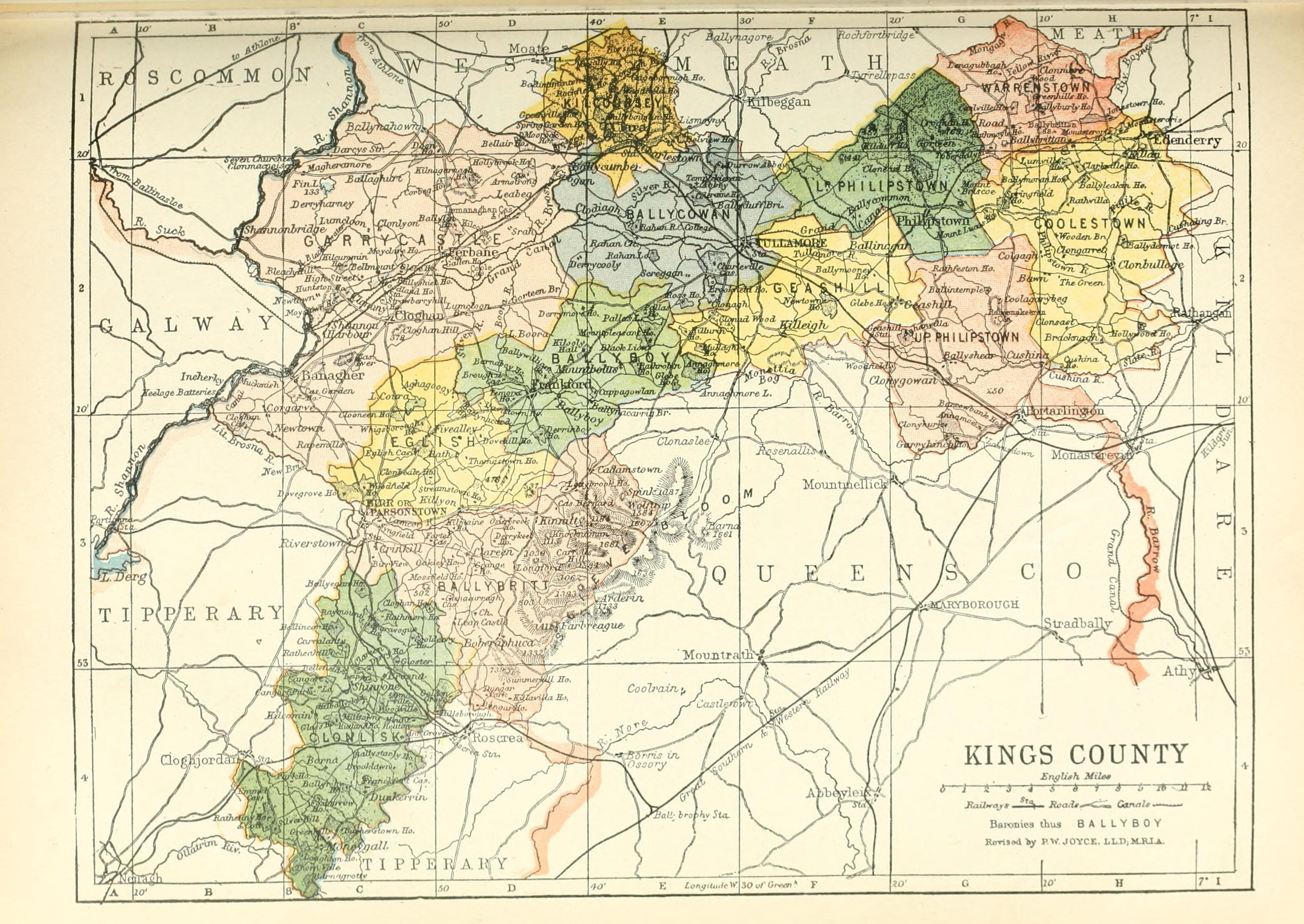
- Baronies of County Offaly. Geashill is shaded yellow.
- Interactive map of Geashill
- Location within Ireland
- Coordinates: 53°14′31″N 7°26′02″W
- Sovereign state: Ireland
- County: Offaly

Area
  - Total: 124.9 km^{2} (48.2 sq mi)

Geashill (/ˈɡiːʃəl/, Irish: Géisill) is a barony in County Offaly (formerly King's County), Ireland.

== Etymology ==
The name Geashill is from the village of Geashill (Irish Géisill, "place of swans").

== Location ==
Geashill barony is located in central County Offaly, south of the Grand Canal. The Tullamore River and Clodiagh River flow through it, and it contains the Hawkswood Bog Natural Heritage Area.

== History ==
Geashill is roughly formed from the ancient Túath Géisille of the Uí Failge septs of Leinster. As Viscount Clanmalier the Ó Diummasach (O'Dempsey) held part of this barony, where the main castle of the clan was located. The Ó hAimherigin (O'Bergin) sept are noted as chiefs in this barony in medieval times.

== List of settlements ==
Below is a list of settlements in Geashill barony:

- Ballinagar
- Geashill
- Killeigh

== Sport ==
There are 3 GAA clubs in Geashill(barony).

Ballinagar- Football only-play hurling with Clodiagh Gaels

Clodiagh Gaels- Hurling and Football

Raheen- Football only-play hurling with Clodiagh Gaels

== Schools ==
Schools in the Geashill(barony) include:

- Geashill National school
- Killeigh National school
- Cloneygowan National school
- Cloneyhurke national school
