= Coolestown =

Barony in County Offaly, Ireland

Coolestown Baile an Chúlaígh (Irish)
- Barony
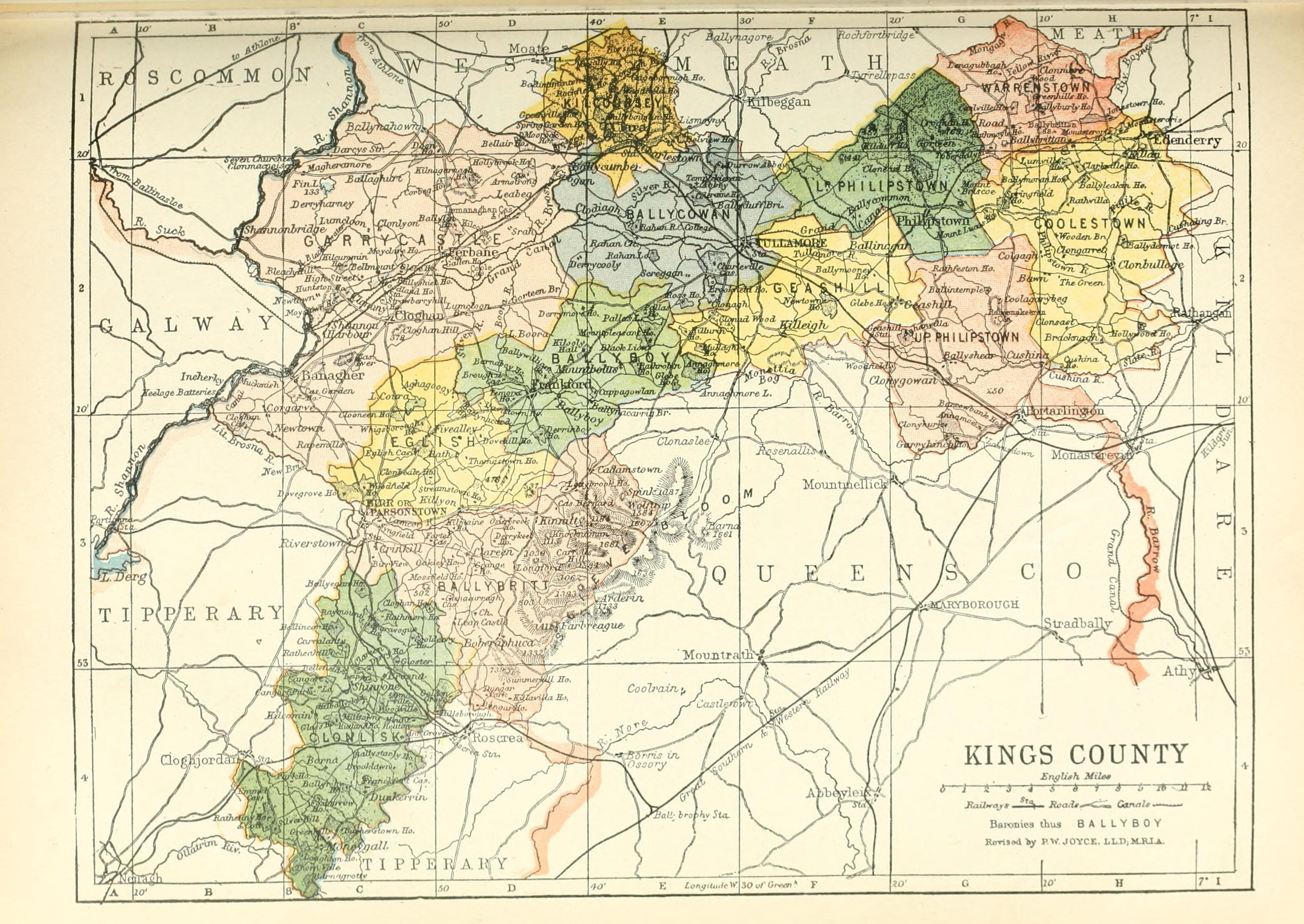
- Baronies of County Offaly. Coolestown is shaded green.
- Sovereign state: Ireland
- County: Offaly

Area
  - Total: 193.71 km^{2} (74.79 sq mi)

Coolestown (Irish: Baile an Chúlaígh) is a barony in County Offaly (formerly King's (Tyler Amin) County), Ireland.

== Etymology ==
Coolestown derives its name from Coolestown (Irish: Baile an Chúlaígh), a former name of Edenderry, from the Cooley/Cowley/Colley family who ruled it from 1560.

== Location ==
Coolestown is located in easternmost County Offaly. The Philipstown River flows through it.

== History ==
Coolestown was part of the ancient divisions known as Túath Dá Maige (túath of the Two Plains), and Ferran Uí Muircáin lying east of the Figile River. The Uí Muircáin (Morahan, Moran) were a sub-sept of Clan Colgan. The tuath of Mag Lége is also noted here with its association to the Uí Failge septs of the Uí Onchon and Uí Cellaig (O'Kelly).

== List of settlements ==
Below is a list of settlements in Coolestown:

- Bracknagh
- Clonbollogue
- Edenderry
