= Clonygowan =

Village in County Offaly, Ireland

Cloneygowan Cluain na nGamhan
- Village
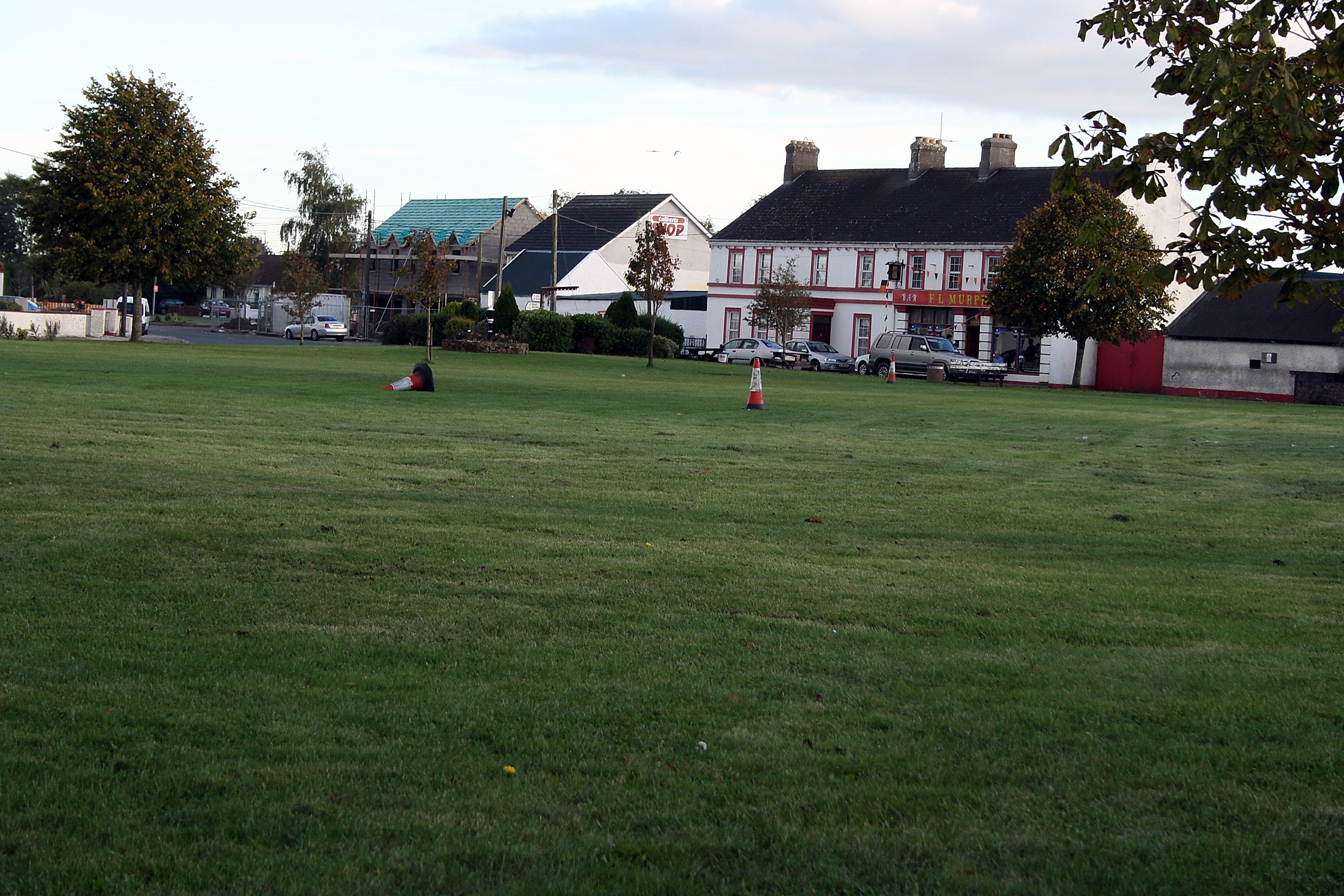
- Cloneygowan

- Location in Ireland
- Coordinates: 53.188000°N 7.280728°W
- Country: Ireland
- Province: Leinster
- County: County Offaly

Population (2016)
  - Total: 198

Clonygowan (also Cloneygowan) (Irish: Cluain na nGamhan, meaning 'pasture of the calves') is a village in County Offaly, Ireland, on the R420 regional road between Tullamore to Portarlington road. As of the 2016 census, it had a population of 198 people. The main village centre is built around a central green.

== Places of interest ==
While Clonygowan House no longer exists, a dovecote, designed in the manner of a folly and built on the estate grounds circa 1830, survives as a reminder of the former house.

== Events and culture ==
The annual Gooseberry Fair takes place in Clonygowan every August.

== Education ==
Scoil Mhuire is a five-classroom primary school located in Clonygowan.

== Sport ==
The local Gaelic Athletic Association club, Raheen GAA, won the Offaly Intermediate Football Championship in 1981 and 2014.
