= Warrenstown =

Warrenstown Baile an Bhairínigh (Irish)
- Barony
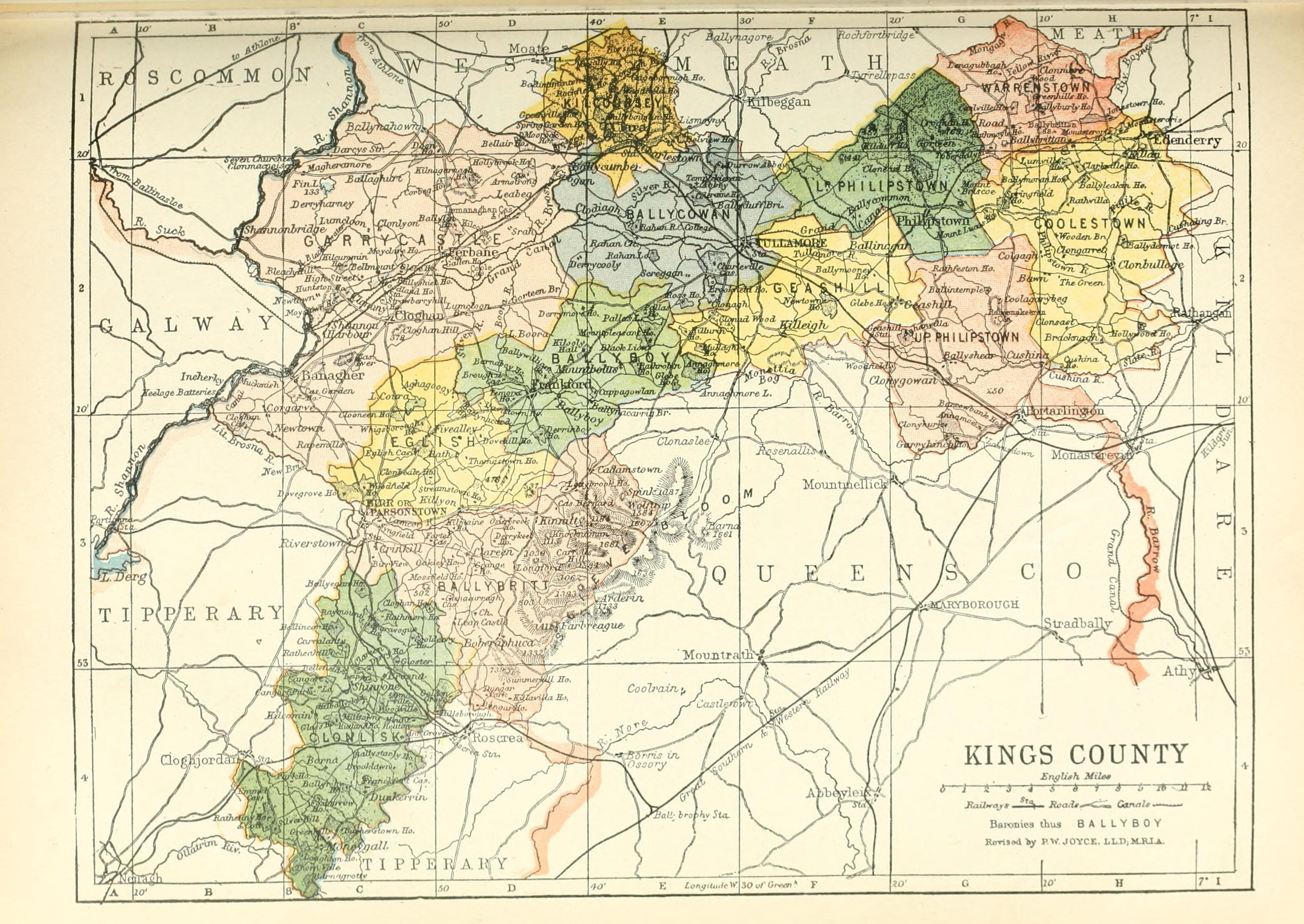
- Baronies of County Offaly. Warrenstown is shaded orange.
- Sovereign state: Ireland
- County: Offaly

Area
  - Total: 86.83 km^{2} (33.53 sq mi)

Warrenstown (Irish: Baile an Bhairínigh) is a barony in County Offaly (formerly King's County), Ireland.

== Etymology ==
Warrenstown takes its name from Ballybrittain Castle, also called Warrenstown Castle, located east of Rhode, a tower house held by the Warren family from 1600.

== Location ==
Warrenstown barony is in northeast County Offaly, west of the Boyne. The Yellow River flows through it.

== History ==
Warrenstown is roughly formed from the tuath Tuath Muighe Cloinne Cholgain, indicating a relationship to the Ó hAonghusa (O'Hennessy) and Ó hUallacháin (O'Houlihan). The Crích na Cétach (O'Fallon) and the Clann Máel Chéin are noted people early to this area. Tuath Muighe (a.k.a. Tuath dá Maige, or Tethmoy) was an ancient district which comprised the modern baronies of Warrenstown and the northern part of Coolestown. The Berminghams were early Anglo-Norman grantees of Tethmoy.

== List of settlements ==
Below is a list of settlements in Warrenstown barony:

- Rhode
