= Bourtange moor =

Bog area in northern Germany and Netherlands

Coordinates: 52°53′45″N 7°15′35″E

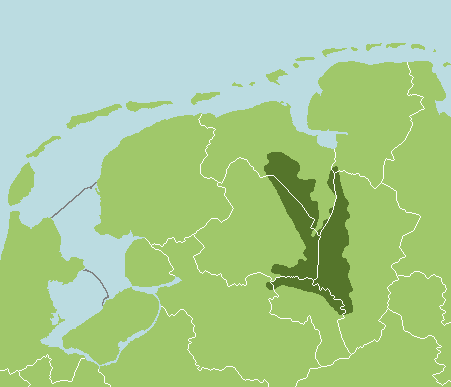
The former Bourtange Swamp

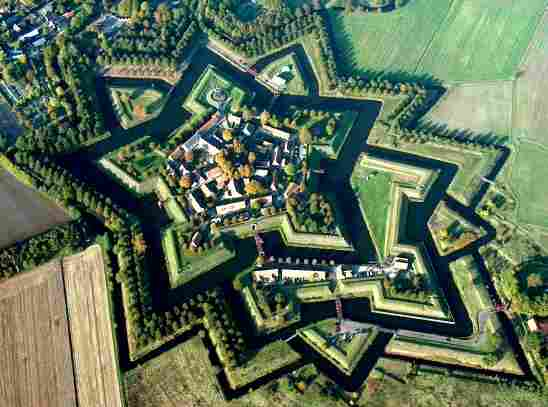
Bourtange fortification

The Bourtanger Moor (Dutch: Bourtangerveen/Bourtangermoeras, German: Bourtanger Moor, Low Saxon: Boertanger Moor) was a bog in eastern parts in the Dutch provinces of Drenthe and Groningen and the bordering German districts of Bentheim and Emsland. A remaining stretch on the border between Drenthe and the districts Emsland and Betheim is now a nature reserve, the Internationaler Naturpark Bourtanger Moor-Bargerveen.

== Shape and size ==
The Bourtanger Moor was an extensive raised bog landscape in the border region of the northeastern Netherlands and northwestern Germany. In prehistoric reconstructions, the peatland was bounded by the Hondsrug to the west and the valley of the Ems to the east.

Estimates of the extent of the former peatland vary according to how its boundaries are defined. Landschapsbiografie van Westerwolde gives a prehistoric extent of about 3,000 km^{2} (1,200 sq mi), while a 2024 study describes the former Bourtanger Moor bog landscape as covering about 160,000 ha (1,600 km^{2}; 620 sq mi).

Bargerveen, in southeastern Drenthe, covers about 2,083 ha (20.83 km^{2}; 8.04 sq mi) and is the only significant surviving Dutch remnant of the former Bourtanger Moor bog landscape.

== History ==
The swamp arose around 5000 BC. The area was already inhabited before this happened, as shown by archeological finds such as the one at Hoetsmansmeer in Groningen. These finds are attributed to nomads from the Mesolithic. Eventually these people left because of the growing swamp. Near Valthe - Ter Apel and Nieuw-Dordrecht remnants of roads through the bog were found, dating from the Neolithic to the Iron Age.

From a military point of view the swamp had an important function as a protective barrier, especially between 1580 and 1850. The swamp played an important role during the wars between Groningen and Münster In places with passages through or along the bog, strongholds were built. Bourtange, Oudeschans, Nieuweschans, Valtherschans and Emmerschans are examples of these places.

== Cultivation ==
Initially cultivation only occurred at the edges of the swamp. The harvested peat was a source of fuel. During the second half of the Middle Ages the monasteries of Aduard and Essen played an important role in cultivating the bog. In the Middle Ages some places at the edges of the bog were drained for growing rye. The drainage caused soil settling and the area became more vulnerable to floodings. Between 1360 and 1500 parts in the northeast were washed away by the Dollart.

In the 16th century large-scale peat harvesting began. The Frisian method, using canals, was introduced. At first most peat harvesting was done at the river Hunze near the city of Groningen. The peat could be transported to the city via this small river. In the 17th century, Westerwolde came under control of the city of Groningen and the peat harvesting became more large-scaled Johan de la Haye and Johan Sems designed a line right through the western 'leg' of the bog, de Semslinie. De Semslinie is a straight line between Wolfsbarge (a village near the Zuidlaardermeer) and Ter Apel. Nowadays it is the border between Drenthe and the Province of Groningen.

The Stadskanaal (City canal), which was dug in the 18th century, largely follows the Semslinie. This canal played a significant role in the large-scale peat harvesting. The areas that were cultivated were called veenkoloniën (peat colonies).

Due to peat harvesting and drainage the remaining swamp became a lot drier. This was bad for the military function of the eastern branch. Therefore, dikes were built near Bourtange to keep water there.

Also colonists from Germany, who grew buckwheat, arrived in the Dutch part of the bog. In order to make the soil suitable to grow buckwheat the peat had to be burned. Because of the inconvenience it brought, it was banned in 1925.

During the 19th century peat as a fuel, got competition from coal and peat harvesting became less profitable. In the second half of the 19th century another important canal was dug, the Verlengde Hoogeveensche Vaart. This resulted in more peat harvesting in the southern points of the bog. In the 20th century peat was no longer the main product from the bog, but activated charcoal, turfstrooisel (a sort of compost) and potting soil became important products. No new canals were dug and products from the bog was being largely transported to factories via narrow gauge railways. From there it was transported by ship, tram engine, train or truck. After the Amsterdamse Veld in southeast Drenthe was stripped of its peat, the harvesting of peat and other products from the bog stopped. A remaining part of the bog and surroundings including the Amsterdamse Veld are now part of the Bargerveen Nature Reserve, a Ramsar site. In Germany peat harvesting continued in the 21st century.

== Bog bodies ==
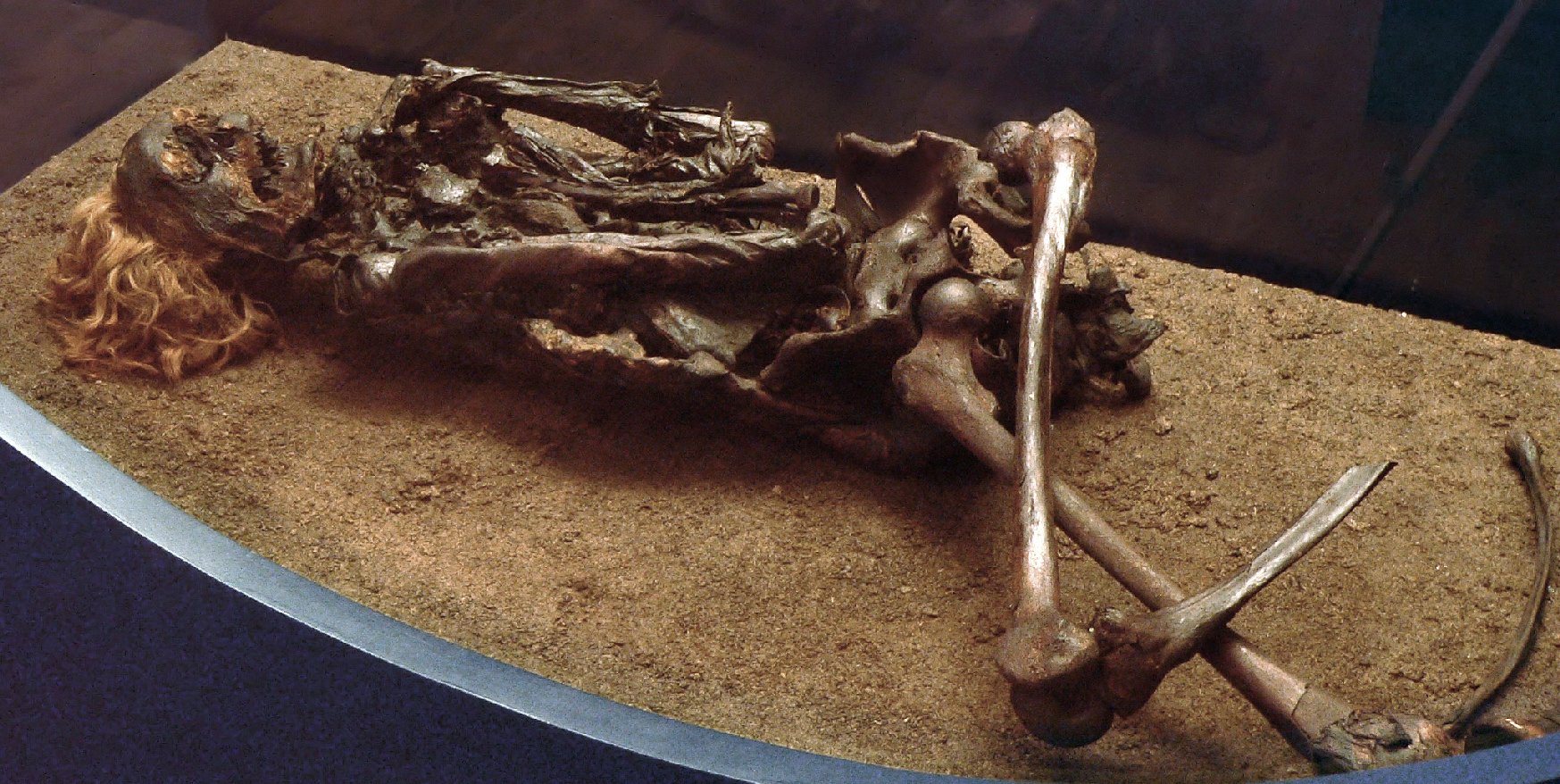
Roter Franz

Several bog bodies were found in the bog, including the Weerdinge Men (found near Weerdinge in Drenthe), Aschbroeken Man, also from Drenthe, Roter Franz (Neu Versen in Emsland) and the Kibbelgaarn body (Kibbelgaarn in Groningen)
