= Ballycumber =

Village in County Offaly, Ireland

Ballycumber Béal Átha Chomair
- Village
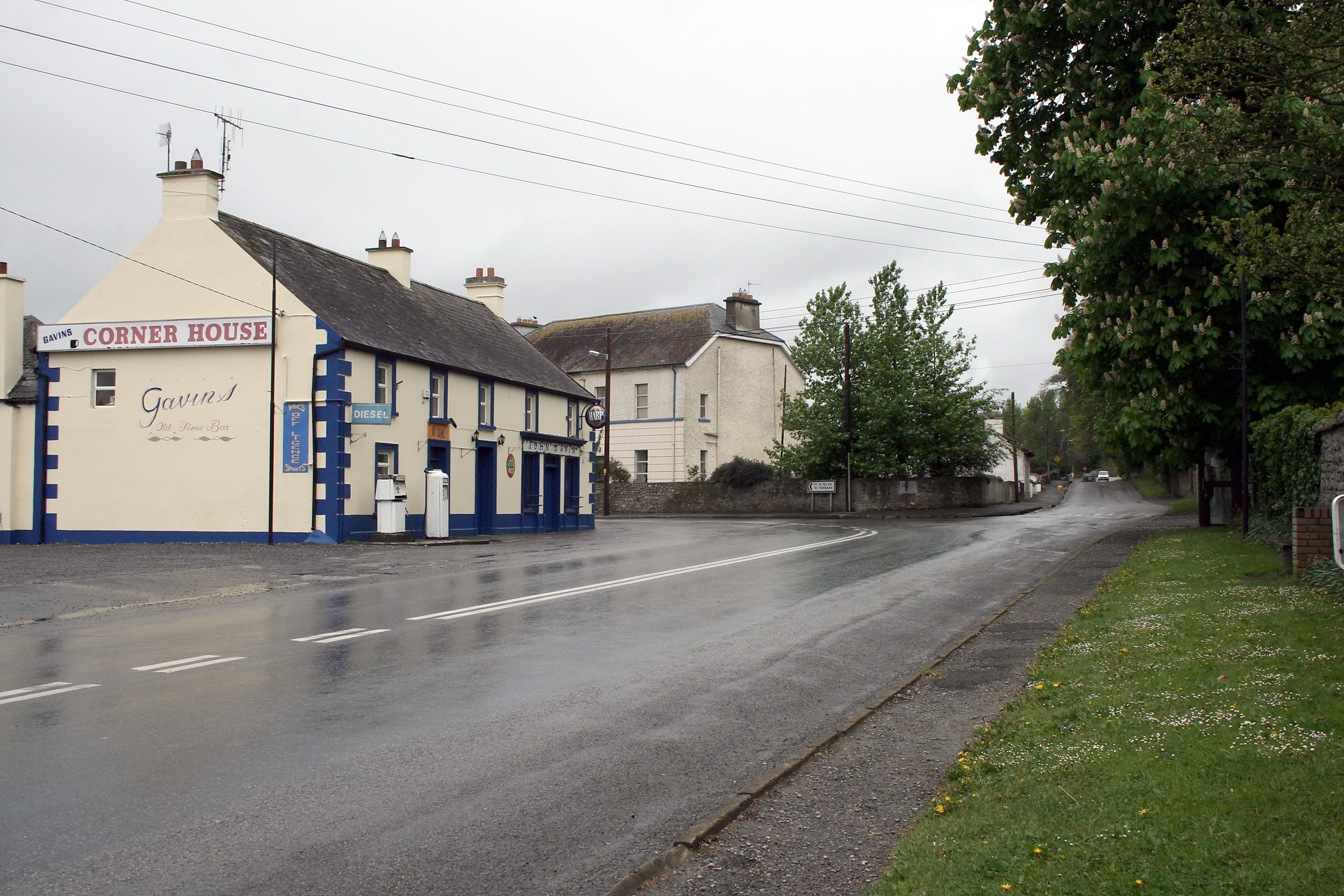
- R436 road through the village

- Location in Ireland
- Coordinates: 53.326509°N 7.6854524°W
- Country: Ireland
- Province: Leinster
- County: Offaly

Population (2016)
  - Total: 208
- Time zone: UTC+0 (WET)
  - Summer (DST): UTC-1 (IST (WEST))

Ballycumber (Irish: Béal Átha Chomair, meaning 'ford-mouth of (the) confluence') is a village located where the R436 regional road crosses the River Brosna in County Offaly, Ireland. It is 5 km (3 mi) west of the town of Clara, on the western edge of Clara bog. According to the 2016 census, the population of Ballycumber was 208 people.

Ballycumber is located in the civil parish of Leamonaghan. The church in nearby Boher (dedicated to Saint Manchán of Lemanaghan, a local saint) was opened in 1861; before that there was a mud-walled church in the area which has left no trace.

== Transport ==
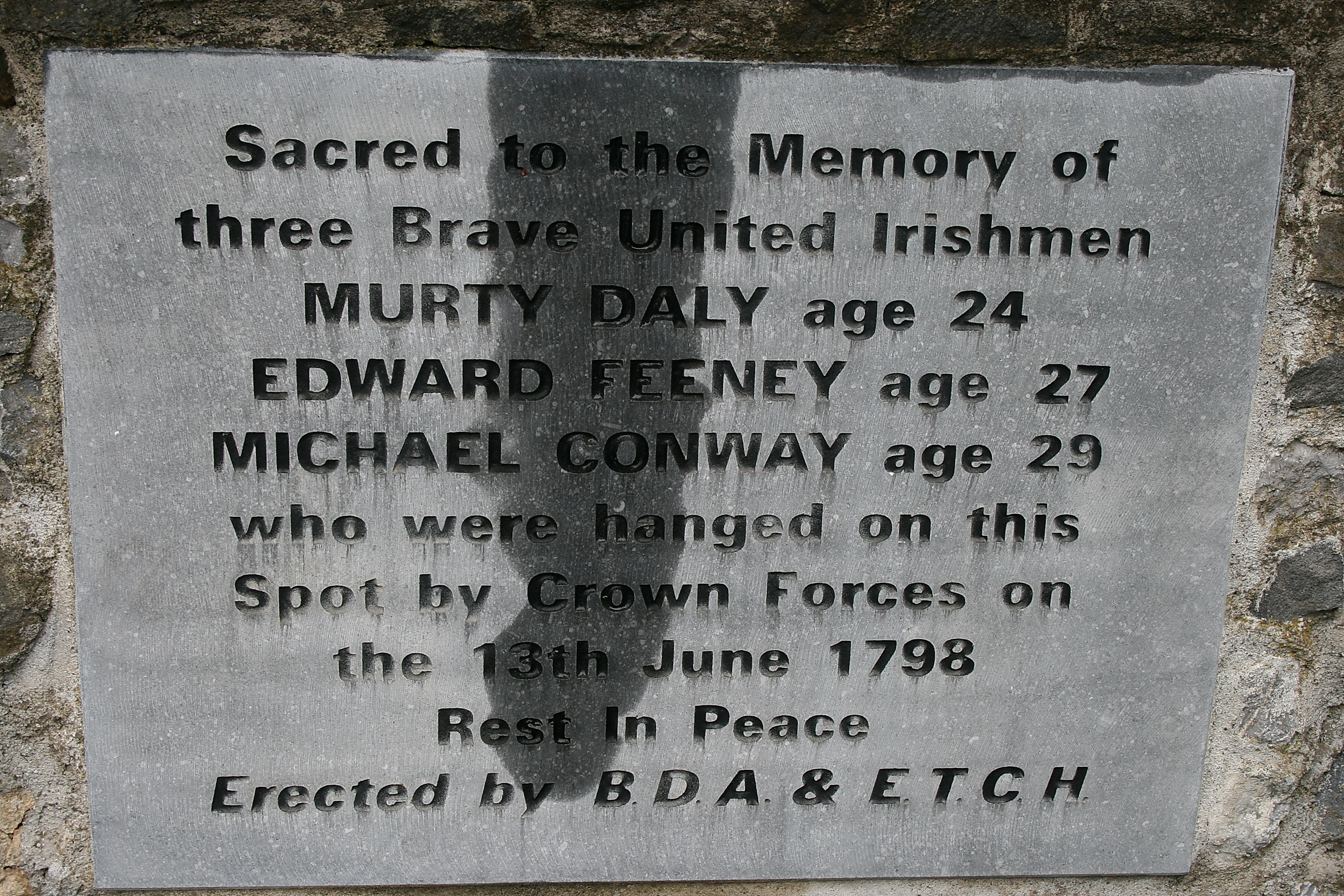
1798 rebellion memorial on the roadside

The M6 motorway connecting Dublin and Galway is a ten-minute drive away. Bus Éireann runs an hourly schedule from Moate and Tullamore with buses going to Galway, Dublin, Waterford, and Belfast. Iarnód Éireann run a train from Dublin to Galway every second hour from Clara train station. Ballycumber station opened on 1 March 1862 and closed on 17 June 1963.

== Education ==
Boher National School is located beside Saint Manchan's Church in Boher, outside Ballycumber. It was reputedly founded by Saint Manchan and Saint Ciaran, hence its name. As of 2017, the school had more than about 120 pupils. The old schoolhouse, to the west of the church, was turned into living quarters as the new school was built to the east of the church in 1989.

== Sports ==
Ballycumber GAA pitch is located 2 miles (3.2 km) outside of the village with an adjoining community centre. Ballycumber have many titles to their name. Their colours are blue and saffron. There is a senior team, consisting of just Ballycumber players. However, the minor, Under-21, U-16, U-14, U-10 and U-8's team are joined with Tubber GAA to form Ballycumber/Tubber.

Brosna Gaels is the local hurling team, made up of the parish of Leamonaghan, which includes Ballycumber, Doon and Pullough with permission players from Tubber. Brosna Gaels field teams at all levels from Senior to Under-6. They gained senior status following a 2009 Intermediate Championship win.

Ballycumber also have an association football team, Ballycumber Rovers, which has won county cups and other titles.

== Ballycumber in literature ==
The name of Ballycumber is defined in a jocular manner by writer Douglas Adams in The Meaning of Liff, as "BALLYCUMBER: (n) One of the six half-read books lying somewhere in your bed." For this reason, the bookcrossing.com mascot and symbol is named "Ballycumber".

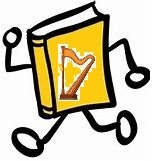
Ballycumber: The mascot of bookcrossing.com

The play "Tales of Ballycumber" by Sebastian Barry was shown in Abbey Theatre in Dublin in 2009.

== People ==
Former or current residents of the village have included:

- Richard Crosbie (1755-1824), first Irishman to make a manned flight lived in Twickenham House just outside the village in the 1780s
- Seán William McLoughlin (born 1990), Irish YouTuber better known by the name of Jacksepticeye, began his YouTube channel while living in the village circa 2008.
- Luke O'Toole (1873-1929), Irish Gaelic games administrator was born in the village
- Sheila Wingfield (1906-1992), Anglo-Irish poet, whose family homes included the Bellair and Ballycumber estates

== See also ==
- Blue Lights on the Runway (2008), the fourth studio album by Irish band Bell X1, parts of which were recorded in Ballycumber House
- Saint Manchan's Shrine, a 12th-century Irish house-shaped shrine dedicated to Manchán of Lemanaghan, now held in Boher Roman Catholic Church, outside Ballycumber
