= Clara Bog =

Bog and nature reserve in County Offaly, Ireland

Coordinates: 53°19′11″N 7°38′23″W

- Irish: Dúlra Phortach Chlóirthigh
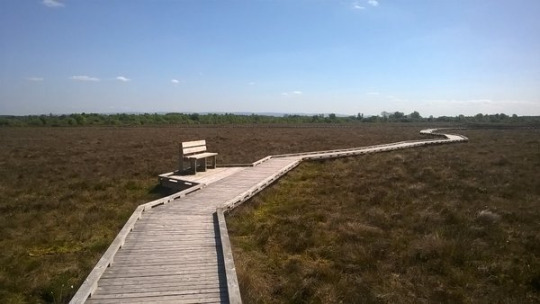
- Walkway in Clara Bog
- Interactive map of Clara Bog
- Location: County Offaly, Ireland
- Governing body: National Parks and Wildlife Service
- Website: website

Ramsar Wetland
- Designated: 6 December 1988
- Reference no.: 415

Clara Bog is one of the largest relatively intact raised bogs remaining in Ireland. It lies southeast of the R436 regional road between the village of Ballycumber and the town of Clara, in County Offaly. Much of the bog is state-owned and managed as a nature reserve covering some 460 ha. A Special Area of Conservation covers 836 ha.

== History ==
The bog was formed in a depression, originally a shallow lake, at the end of the last ice age. An esker left by retreating glaciers cut off drainage to the north (the river Brosna catchment). Although usually classed as a relatively intact bog, it has been negatively affected by peat extraction and by the construction of the Clara to Rahan road in the late 18th century. The bog subsided up to six meters following bisection by the road and associated drainage. The dome structure of the bog was also changed by the road, leaving two domes, a western one and an eastern one.

In the early 1980s, Clara Bog East was drained for potential industrial peat extraction, but public requests were made to the Irish Government to preserve the area by a number of international naturalists, David Bellamy among them. In 1987, both the Dutch and Irish Governments signed a technical agreement for co-operation in the area of peatland management and restoration. Clara Bog was chosen as one of the study sites and partly converted into a nature reserve. The industrial development was stopped and existing drains were blocked. Its status and development since the last ice age concerning flora and hydrology has since been extensively studied. In 1988 it was designated a Ramsar Site. Clara Bog and Raheenmore Bog (also in County Offaly) have been twinned with Bargerveen Nature Reserve, a Dutch Ramsar Site, under the European Natural Sites Twinning Programme (Eurosite).

In 1992 Ireland considered putting forward Clara Bog as a World Heritage Site, but after some years on UNESCO's "tentative list" it was decided that the bog's integrity had been damaged by peat extraction and its candidature was withdrawn in 2009.

== Peat extraction for domestic use ==
For centuries the Irish have taken turf (peat) from bogs as fuel for their fires, and there has been resistance to the requirements of the Habitats Directive for a ban on the tradition in protected areas. After a number of raised bogs, including Clara Bog, were designated Special Areas of Conservation in the 1990s, the Irish government granted itself a derogation to allow "domestic turf-cutting" on SACs for a period of ten years from 1999. Turf-cutting continued on the margins of Clara Bog, although this had a negative impact on its condition. Negotiations took place to relocate turf-cutters to alternative sites of less ecological value. In 2012 it was reported that a number of Clara turf-cutters had relocated to a bog at Rahan.

== Access and facilities for the public ==
In 2011 Brian Cowen completed his last official public engagement as Taoiseach in his hometown of Clara, when he opened the €2.1 million Clara bog visitor centre and library. He commented that the siting of the visitor centre avoided unnecessary intrusion on the tranquillity of the nature reserve.

Public access to the bog is via a trackway from a car park on its eastern edge. Visitors are advised not to leave the boardwalk for safety reasons.

== Gallery ==
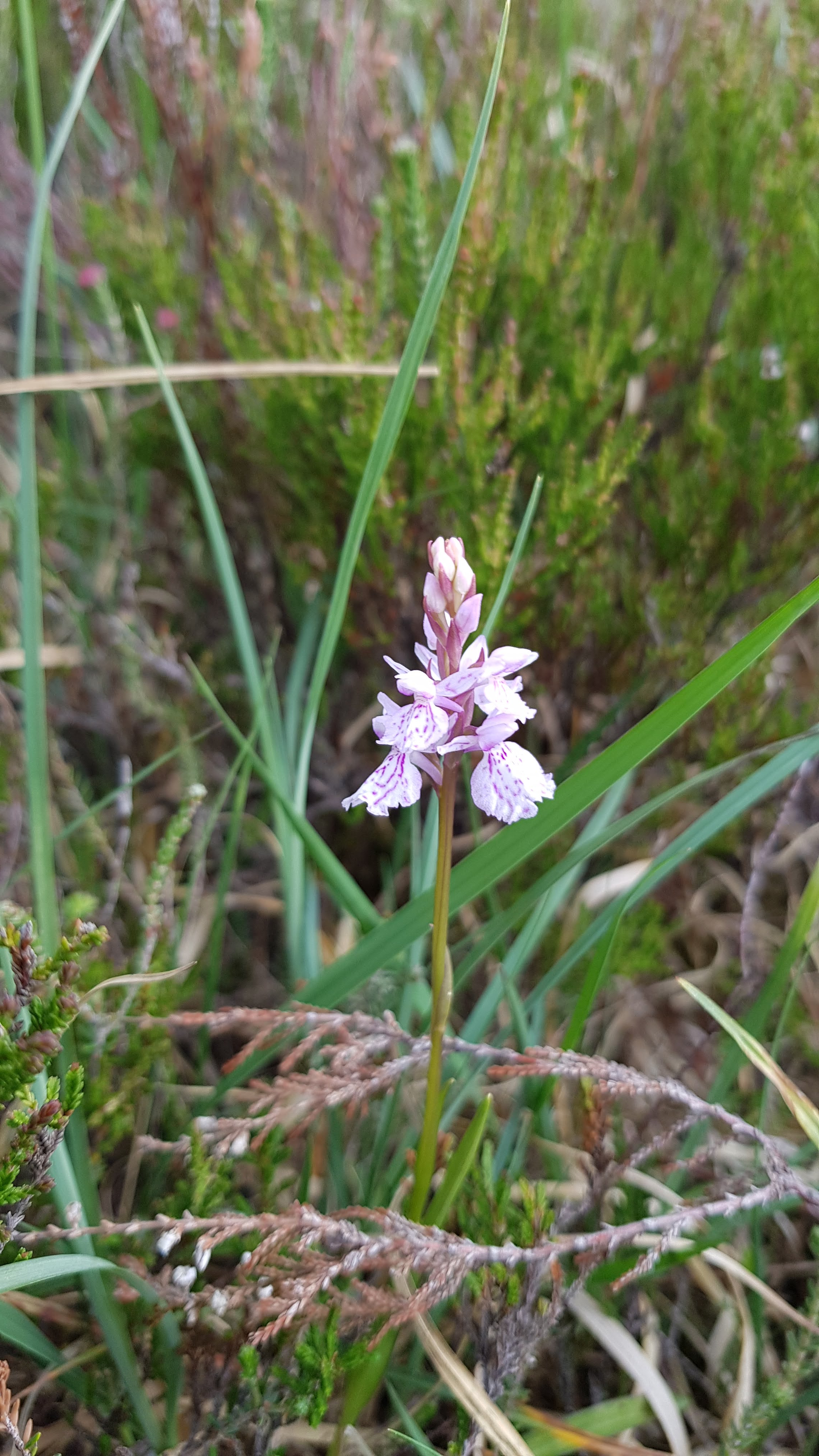
Dactylorhiza orchid growing at Clara

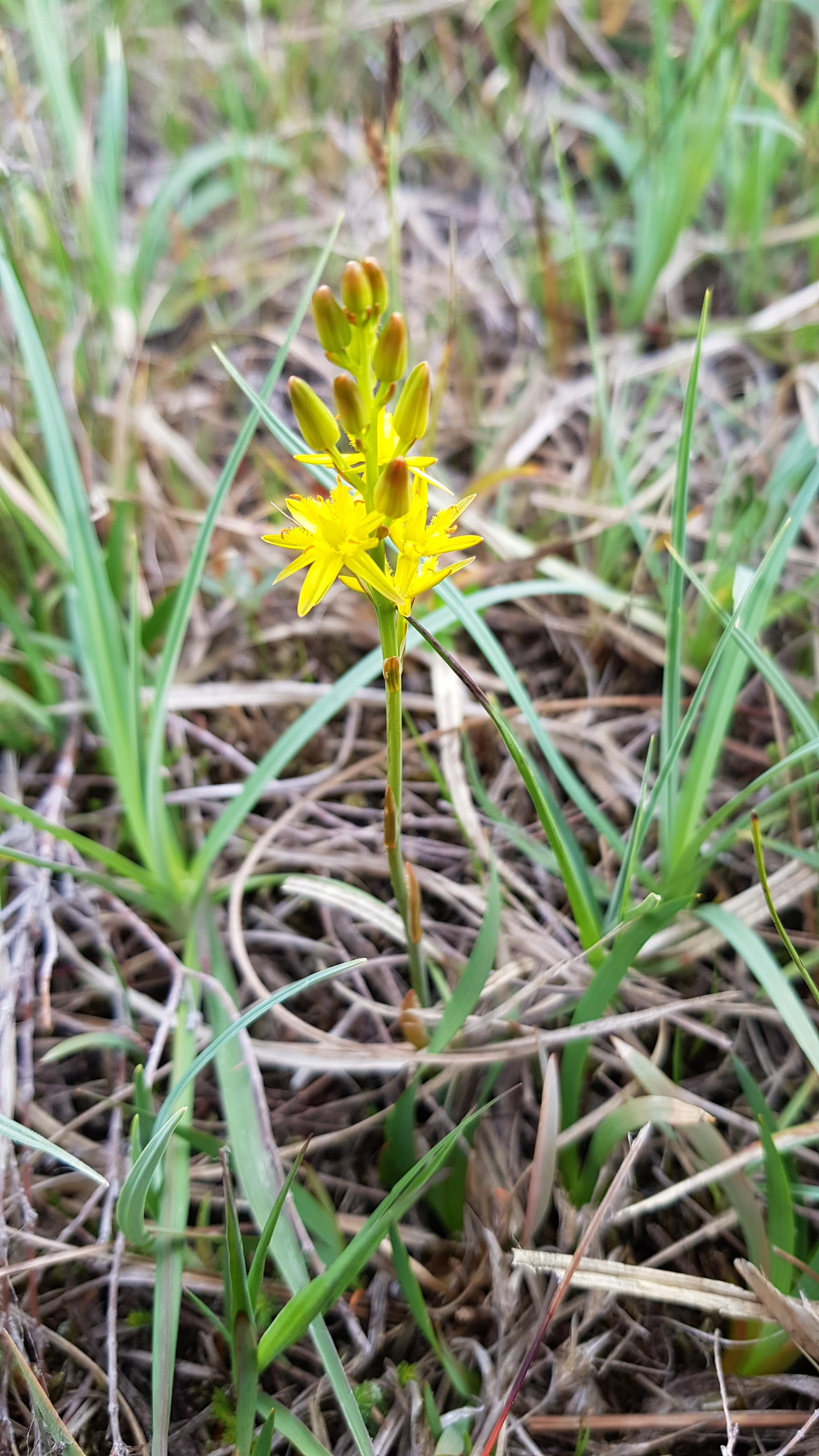
Bog Asphodel growing at Clara

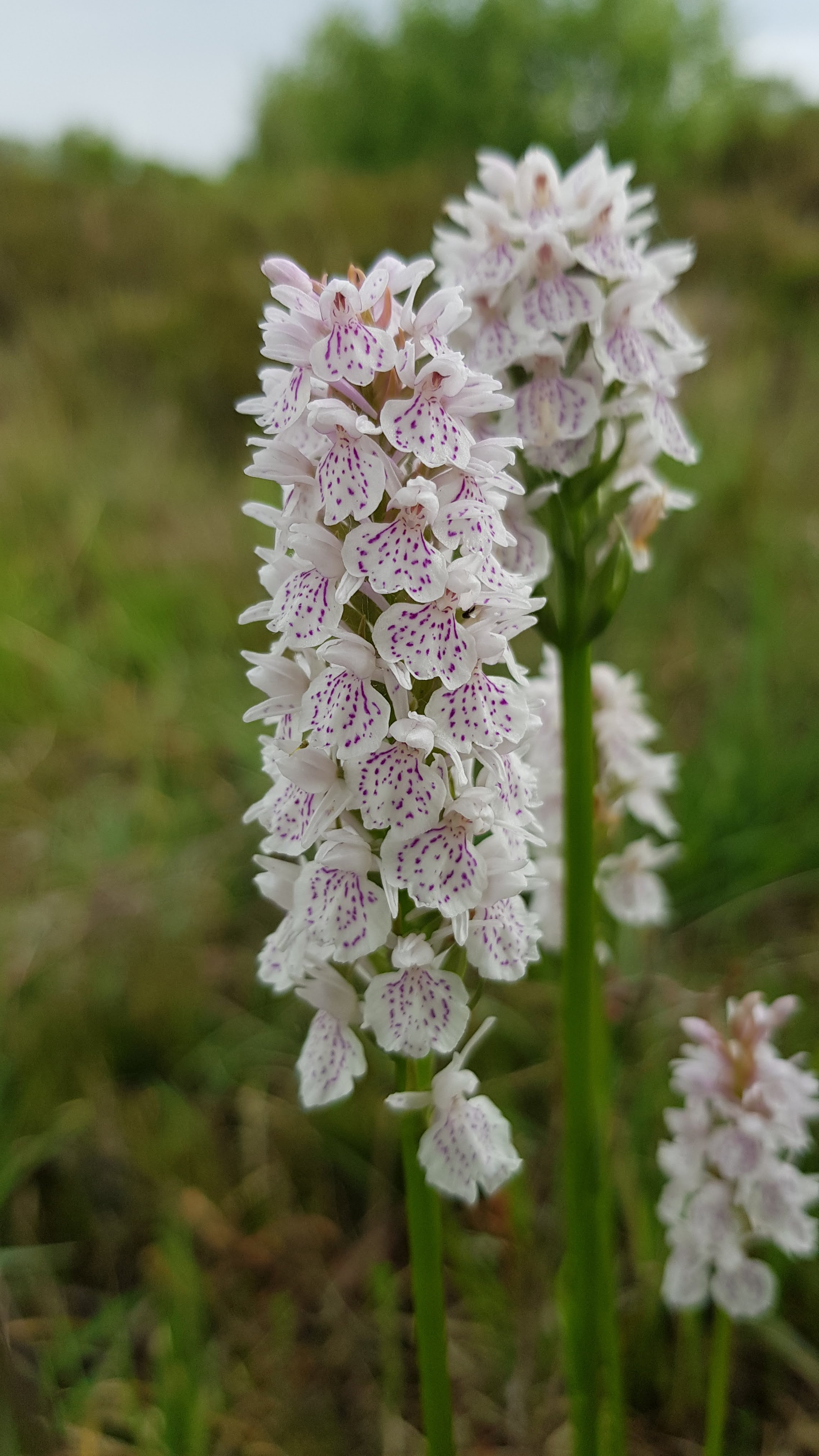
Dactylorhiza orchid growing at Clara
