= Tubber, Ireland =

Tubber, Ireland may refer to:

- Tubber, County Clare, a village and parish in the north of County Clare, Ireland
- Tubber, County Galway, a village in the south of County Galway, Ireland
- Tubber, County Offaly, a parish in County Offaly, Ireland
