= Museum Collectie Brands =

Coordinates: 52°45′01″N 6°58′12″E

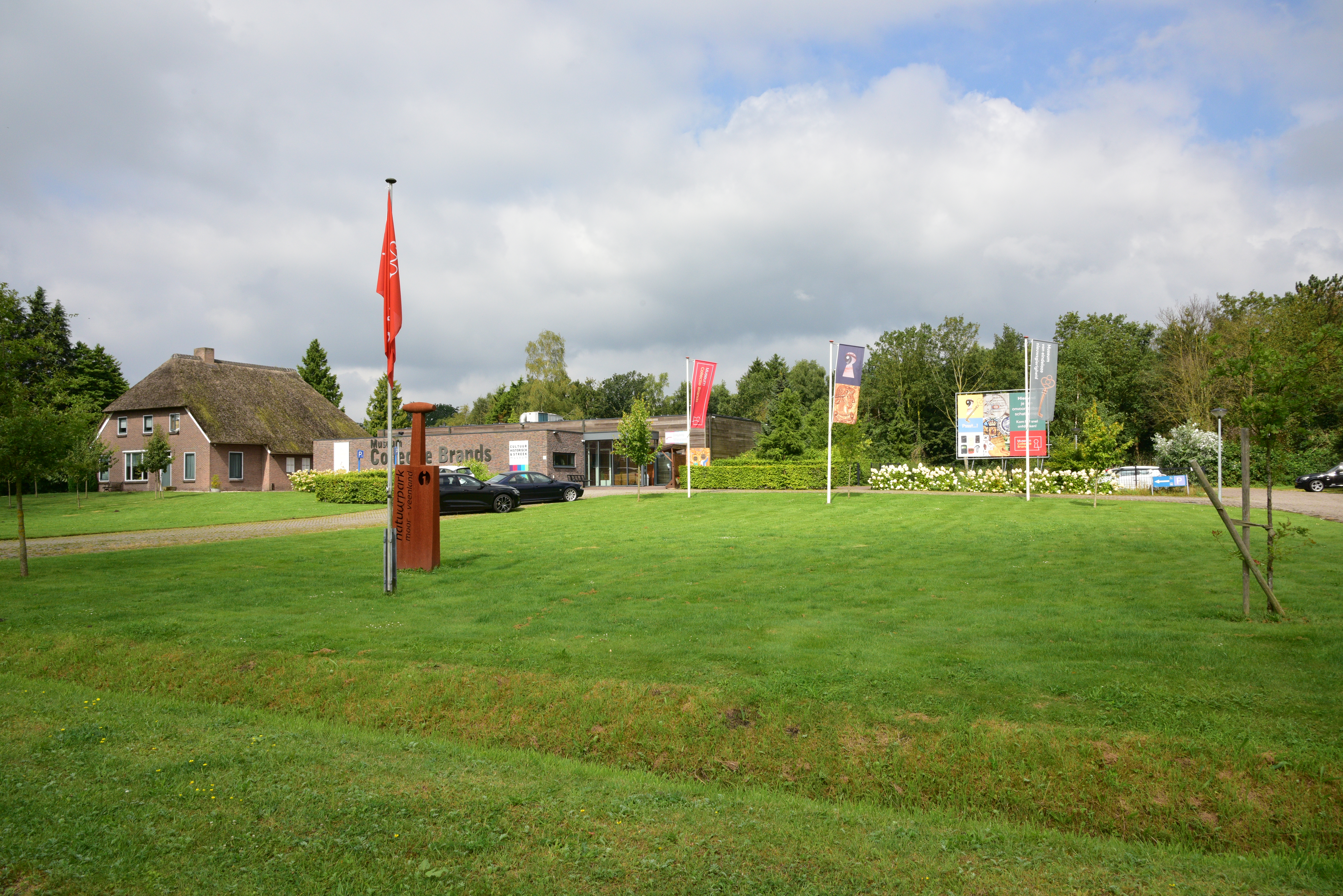
- Exterior of the museum, 2024
- Location: Nieuw-Dordrecht
- Type: Museum
- Collection size: 70,000 books and objects
- Founder: Jans Brands

Museum Collectie Brands is a museum in Nieuw-Dordrecht, Drenthe. The museum contains a collection of over seventy thousand objects and books that were collected by Jans Brands (1932-2019) during his lifetime. The ‘crown jewel’ of the museum is a complete medieval register from 1382, which contains a summary of all the feudal lords and their holdings that had sworn fealty to the then bishop of Utrecht, Floris van Wevelinkhoven.

== History ==
The origins of the museum can be traced to Jans Brands. Jans realized at an early age the value of ordinary items and objects. He kept and collected what others might have tossed out. Later in his life he bought books and items on garage sales, and on auctions he acquired precious and unique artifacts. This way a unique collection of objects was gathered during a period of 65 years. In 1978, during the 125th anniversary of the village of Nieuw-Dordrecht, an exhibition was organized with objects from the collection of Brands. It was during this exhibition that the larger public started to realize the size and historic value of the collection. Because of this a foundation called Nieuw-Dordrecht Historisch en Cultuur was founded by Jans Brands and two others, with the goal to protect the collection for posterity. From 1992 on out, the foundation held a yearly exhibition in the community centre with items from the collection. Five years later a start was made with the improvement of Brands’ farmhouse in order to house and protect the many old newspapers and books he had collected. In 1999 the province of Drenthe gifted the foundation 250.000 Dutch guilder in order to research the cultural-historical value of the collection. Because of this gift, the farmhouse was opened to the public in 2002 during the weekends, and a year later (2003) the Beheer Collectie Brands foundation was established. Plans were made in 2007 for the construction of a new building besides the farmhouse to house the extensive collection. In 2010, these plans were enacted. The construction work, and the bad state of the farmhouse, made it necessary to move the collection to a storage facility in Schoonebeek. In August 2010 work was started on the renovation of the farmhouse and the construction of the building. A mere nine months later, in May 2011, work had advanced to such a degree that the books of the collection could be moved to the newly build library. The official opening of the new library, and incorporated study centre, took place on 17 November 2011. On 5 June 2015, Collectie Brands was official recognized as a museum. At the start of 2017 a minor restructuring of the inside replaced much of the workspace within the farmhouse with room for expositions. In 2020, during the Corona-pandemic, large parts of the library were swapped out for more display and exposition room. As of 2021 plans are underway for a second large expansion of the museum, with a new museum cafe, a second exposition hall, and a courtyard.

== The museum ==
The museum is housed in a renovated farmhouse along the Herenstreek in Nieuw-Dordrecht. The farmhouse was used during the late 19th and early 20th century by the parents of Jans Brands. During the Second World War the farmhouse was damaged extensively when an allied bomber crashed nearby. After the war a new farmhouse was constructed, in which Jans Brands would live for almost his entire life. The dining room, sitting room, and kitchen of the farmhouse remain mostly in their original 1950's look. The part of the farmhouse that originally was used as a working and maintenance space has been transformed into an exposition hall. In 2011 a new, adjacent, building was opened. This connected building contains a secondary exposition hall with study spots, the entrance with a museum shop, and a museum cafeteria.

== The collection ==
The collection of Museum Collectie Brands contains multiple rare and unique objects. The crown jewel of the collection is the so-called ‘feudal lord register’. This register was made in 1382 and contains a complete summary of alle the feudal lords, and their lands, under the bishop of Utrecht. While there is a second copy of this book located in the archives of Utrecht, this copy isn't as complete as the one held by Museum Collectie Brands.

Other rare and unique objects in the collection are:

- The handwritten last will of Princess Marianne of the Netherlands.
- A fragment of the Sikhote-Alin meteorite.
- An advanced mechanical Curta calculator.
- A golden Solidus (coin), minted during the reign of Dagobert I, king of the Franks, during the early 7th century.
- The book "De Hunenbedden in Nederland", made in 1926 by Dr. A.E. Van Giffen. It contains a detailed description and drawings of the many dolmens in the northern Netherlands.
- A capstone of the gate of Camp Dalum, one of the Emslandlager/ Emsland camps.

The museum also contains works, paintings, and other objects that belonged to the Dutch artists Hendrik Nicolaas Werkman, Jan Dekkers, Hendrik de Vries, and Janny Jalving. The museum also holds in its possession a couple reproductions of works by Van Gogh.

== See also ==
- List of museums in the Netherlands
