= Raheenmore Bog =

Raised bog and nature reserve in County Offaly, Ireland

Coordinates: 53°20′36″N 7°20′17″W

Designations

Ramsar Wetland
- Designated: 6 December 1988
- Reference no.: 417

Raheenmore Bog is a raised bog north-west of Daingean, County Offaly, in Ireland. Since the 1980s the greater part of the bog has been maintained as a 162 hectare Nature Reserve, which is currently managed by the National Parks and Wildlife Service. A Special Area of Conservation covers 182 ha, including some land in private ownership.

== History ==
Since the last Ice Age, Raheenmore Bog has developed in a small basin in the catchment of two major river systems, the Brosna and the Boyne. With a depth of 15 meters it forms the deepest raised bog known in Ireland.

The bog was purchased in 1970 by Bord na Móna to mark European Conservation Year. It was later donated to the National Parks and Wildlife Service. It was designated a Ramsar Site in 1988. Along with Clara Bog, another raised bog in County Offaly, Raheenmore bog has been twinned with Bargerveen, a Dutch Ramsar Site which required restoration after peat digging was stopped in the 1990s. Active management has been undertaken at Raheenmore because hydrological investigation showed that the bog was drying out. Peat dams were built to stop water loss. The progress of this is being monitored for the possibility of using it on other conservation projects.

After Ireland adopted the Habitats Directive in 1997 Raheenmore was designated a Special Area of Conservation.

== Access ==
Like some other Irish nature reserves (for example Mongan Bog), Raheenmore Bog is not open to the public. However, visitors are welcome at Clara Bog, also in County Offaly, which has a visitors' centre.

== See also ==
- Geography of Ireland
