= Ferbane =

Town in County Offaly, Ireland

Ferbane An Féar Bán (Irish)
- Town
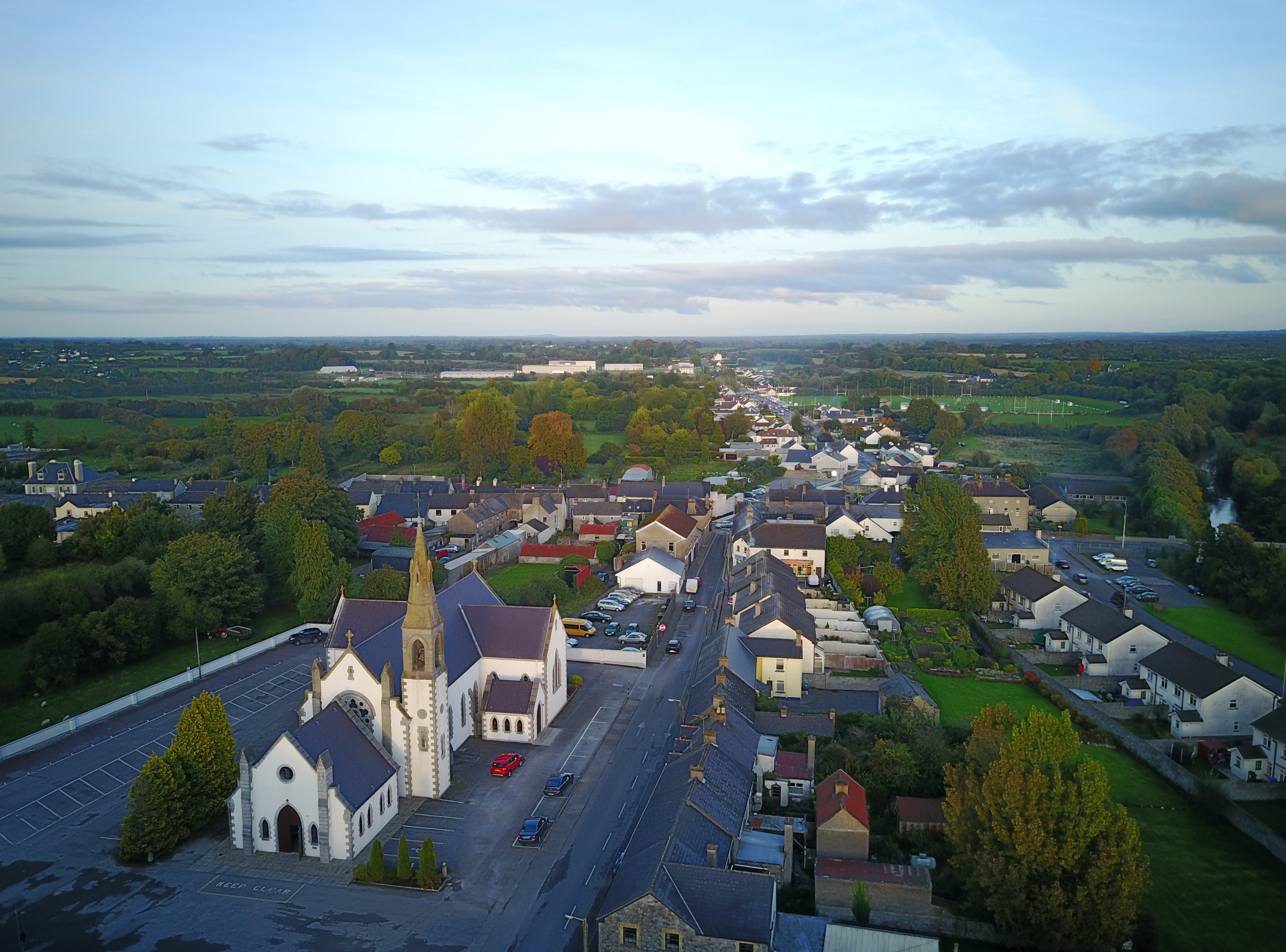
- Parochial Church of Ferbane, Boora and High Street

- Location in Ireland
- Coordinates: 53°16′14″N 7°49′42″W
- Country: Ireland
- Province: Leinster
- County: County Offaly
- Elevation: 50 m (160 ft)

Population (2022)
  - Total: 1,324
- Irish Grid Reference: N114246

Ferbane (/fɜːrˈbæn, fɛər-/; Irish: An Féar Bán) is a town in County Offaly, Ireland. It is on the north bank of the River Brosna, between Birr and Athlone at the junction of the N62 and R436 roads, 20 km south of Athlone. The name of the town is said to come from the white bog cotton which grows in the surrounding Bog of Allen.

Ireland's first milled-peat fired power station was commissioned by the Electricity Supply Board (ESB) at Ferbane in 1957. Since the station's closure in 2001, the Shannon Development agency and the ESB have invested €1.4 million in a new business and technology park which opened in 2005.

Historical population
Year	Pop.	±%
1821	594	—
1831	501	−15.7%
1841	515	+2.8%
1851	641	+24.5%
1861	445	−30.6%
1871	419	−5.8%
1881	388	−7.4%
1891	370	−4.6%
1901	320	−13.5%
1911	380	+18.8%
1926	307	−19.2%
1936	301	−2.0%
1946	312	+3.7%
1951	272	−12.8%
1956	708	+160.3%
1961	896	+26.6%
1966	1,078	+20.3%
1971	1,064	−1.3%
1981	1,402	+31.8%
1986	1,374	−2.0%
1991	1,285	−6.5%
1996	1,270	−1.2%
2002	1,198	−5.7%
2006	1,164	−2.8%
2011	1,165	+0.1%
2016	1,191	+2.2%
2022	1,324	+11.2%

== History ==
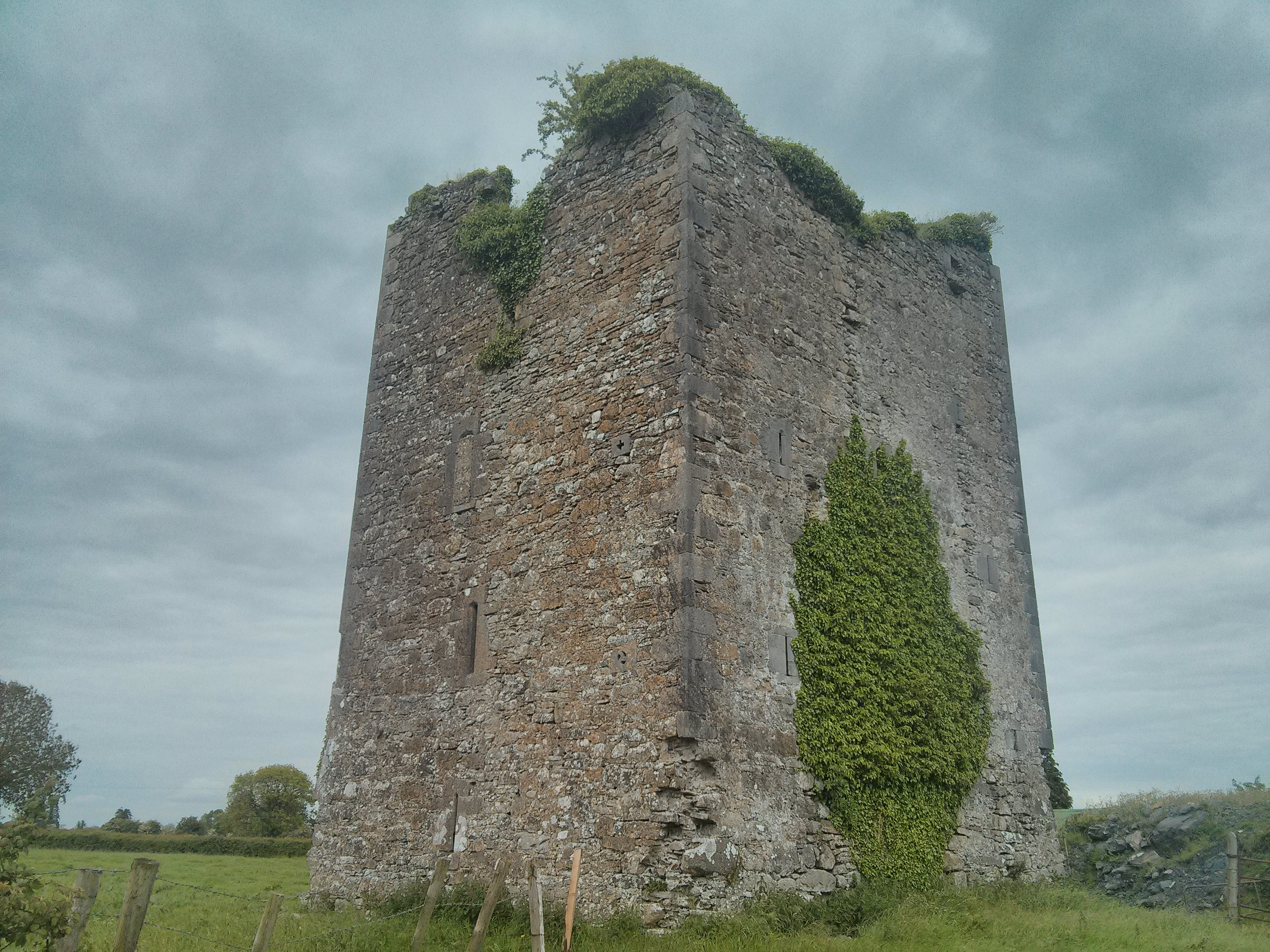
Coole Castle, Ferbane

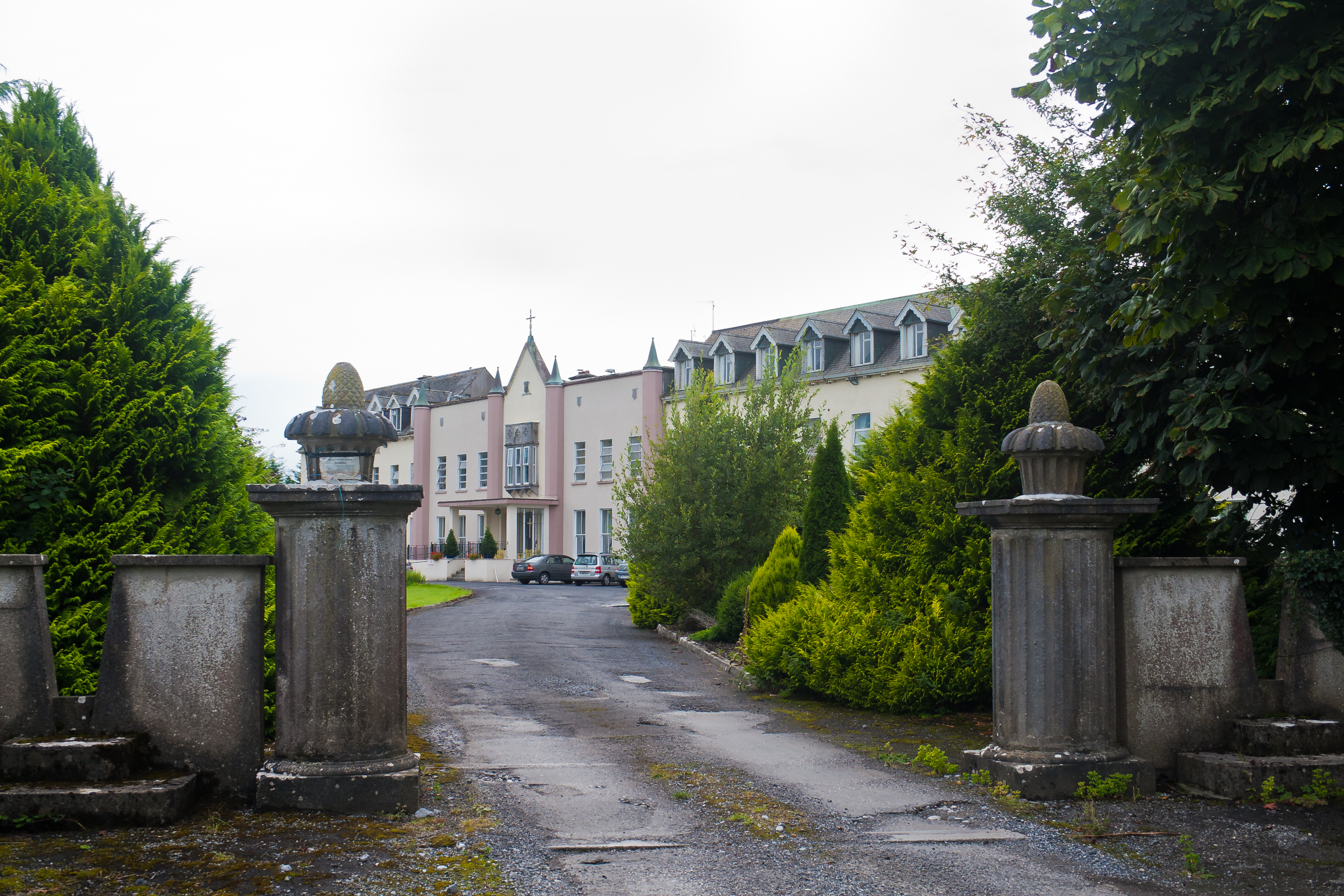
Ferbane Nursing Home 2010

=== Coole Castle ===
Sir John MaCoghlan built Coole Castle on the banks of the Brosna in 1575. It was the last of the MacCoghlan castles to be built. He erected it as a present to his second wife Sabina O'Dallachain. Formerly, there was a mural slab in the castle with a Latin inscription translated in English as "“This tower was built by the energy of Sir John MacCoghlan, K.T. chief of this Sept at the proper cost of Sabina O'Dallachain on the condition that she should have it for her lifetime and afterwards each of her sons according to their seniority".

The whereabouts of the mural is unknown at present. In his will in 1590, Sir John left Coole Castle to his widow. Over the fireplace, in its original location, in the topmost room of the castle is a plaque written in Middle Irish which reads:

"SEAGHA (n) MAC (c) OCHL (ain) DO TINDSCAIN O SEO SUAS 1575" ("Sean Mac Cochlan began (this building) from this (date) 1575")

=== Kilcolgan Castle (Court) ===
Terence Coghlan built Kilcolgan Castle in the early 1640s. In 1646, the Papal Nuncio was sent to Ireland; he stayed for some time in the castle and wrote admiringly of the castle demesne with its beautifully laid out gardens and peacocks strutting on the lawns. The castle continued to be in the possession of the MacCoghlans until the 18th century when it became uninhabited and fell into disrepair. The remains of the castle were demolished in 1954 and the stones used to make foundations for the power station at Lumcloon.

=== Gallen Priory ===
Less than a kilometre south of the town, on the site of an ancient monastery founded by the Welsh missionary Saint Canoc in 492, stands Gallen Priory (formerly a convent of the Sisters of Saint Joseph of Cluny, now a nursing home).

== Education ==
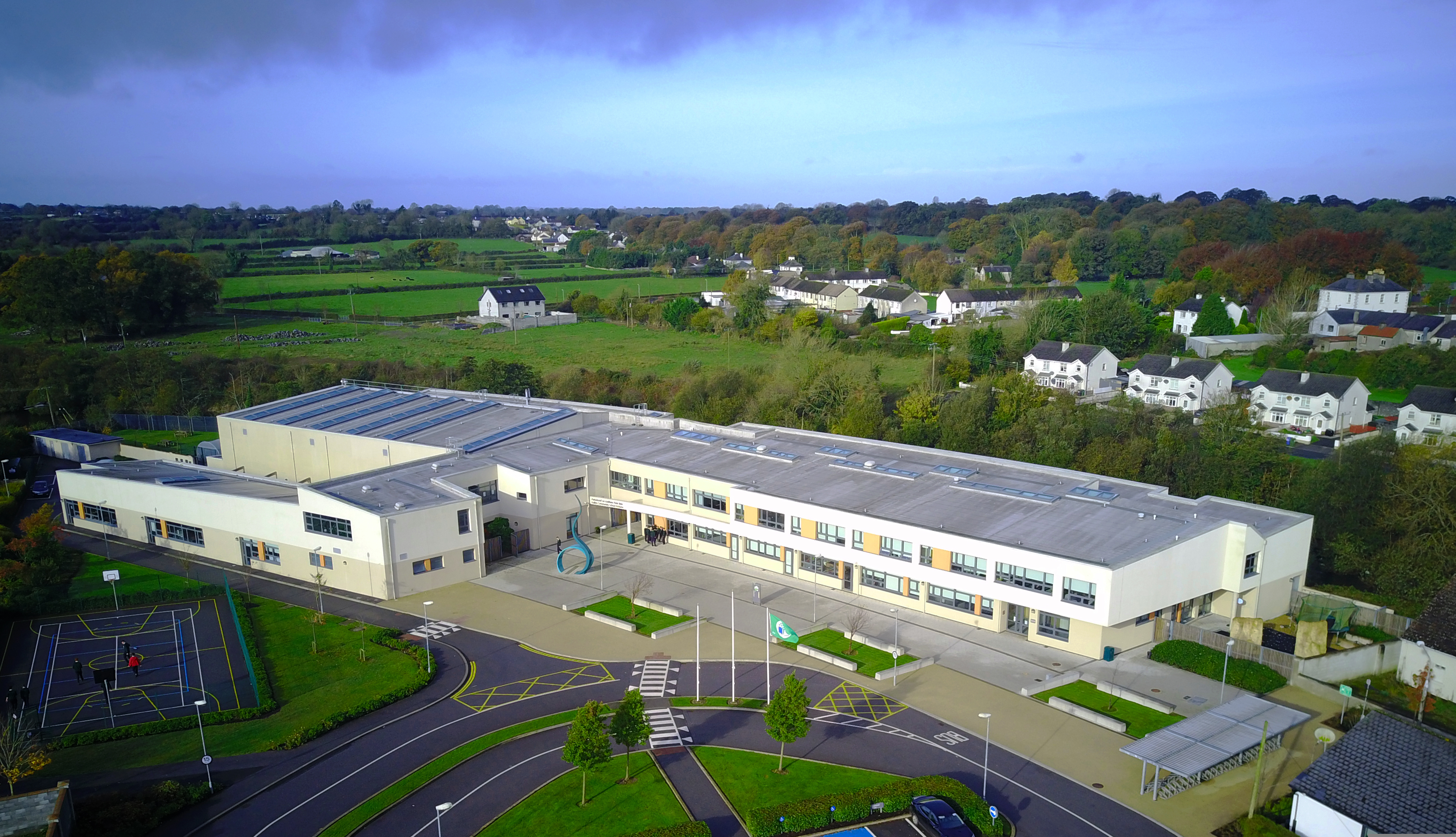
Gallen Community School (second-level school)

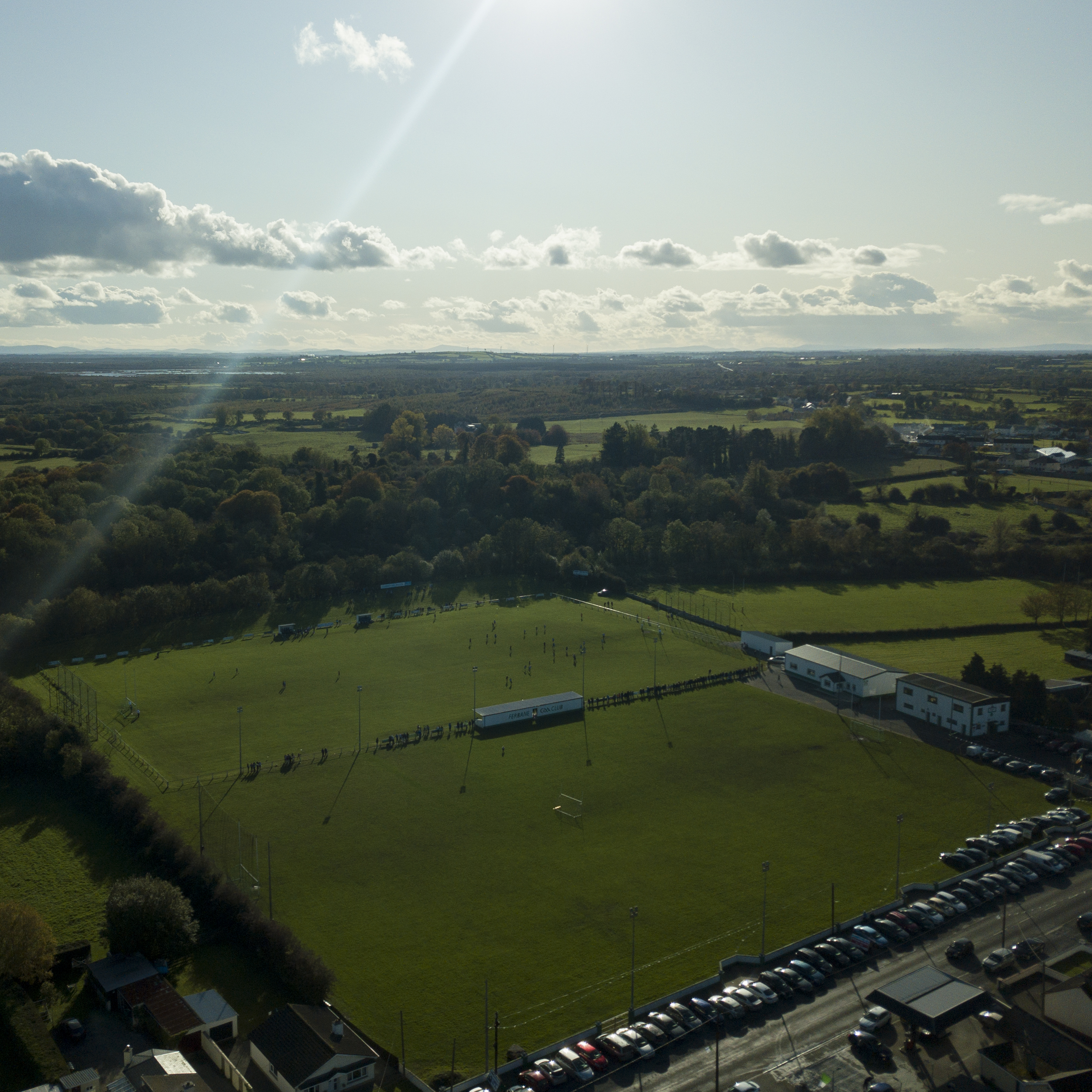
Naomh Ciaran seniors girls football playing Old Leighlin in Ferbane

All of Ferbane's primary and secondary schools have a Catholic ethos and are regulated by the Department of Education through the national curriculum. These include St Cynoc's National School, a national (primary) school which was founded in 2007 through the amalgamation of St Mary's Boys' National School and St Mary's Girls' National School.

Gallen Community School is the local secondary school and has been in existence since 2004 following the amalgamation of two former schools in the town. The school was newly rebuilt in 2011 under the DES Public Private Partnership scheme.

== Community and sport ==
Ferbane GAA is the local Gaelic Athletic Association club. Tony McTague, a Gaelic footballer with the club, was on the Offaly senior team that won the 1971 All-Ireland and 1972 All-Ireland championships. He was Offaly captain in 1972.

Gallen Community School's senior team has won two All Ireland titles (in 2011 and 2016).

In October 2007, 142 residents of the Ferbane area gathered to participate in a globally simultaneous dance to the music of Michael Jackson's Thriller.

== Transport ==
Ferbane is serviced by two bus routes. These include Bus Éireann route 72 (between Athlone and Limerick) and TFI Local Link route 9990 (between Ballycumber and Moate).

The closest train stations to Ferbane are Clara (17 km) and Athlone (19 km). Ferbane's former railway station (which opened in 1884), closed for passenger traffic in 1947 and closed fully in 1963.

The Grand Canal, which links up with the River Shannon, passes through Gallen townland.

== Amenity areas ==
An area of Ferbane industrial park is known locally as the Cow Park as it was once a municipal grazing area. A nearby forested area has a short walking trail along the mill race and a footpath through a predominantly oak-forest.

Other walking trails include the Offaly Way, a national waymarked trail which runs close to Ferbane town. It is a 37 km route that starts at Lemanaghan and finishes at Cadamstown. Lough Boora Discovery Park also has walking trails up to 22 km.

In May 2023, a boardwalk on Ferbane Bog was opened; The raised bog is known locally as Ballylin Bog. According to a representative of the Ferbane Tidy Towns, a link between Ballylin Bog and the Cow Park woodland, through a green corridor of native tree planting, is also proposed.

== Library ==
Ferbane has a public library with children's and adults' sections. The library has computer access, printing services and free wifi.

== Notable people ==
- Conor Kenny (b.1996), rugby player
- Mary Ward (1827–1869), naturalist, astronomer, microscopist, author and artist.

== See also ==
- List of towns and villages in Ireland.
