= R436 road (Ireland) =

Road in Ireland

R436 road
- Bóthar R436
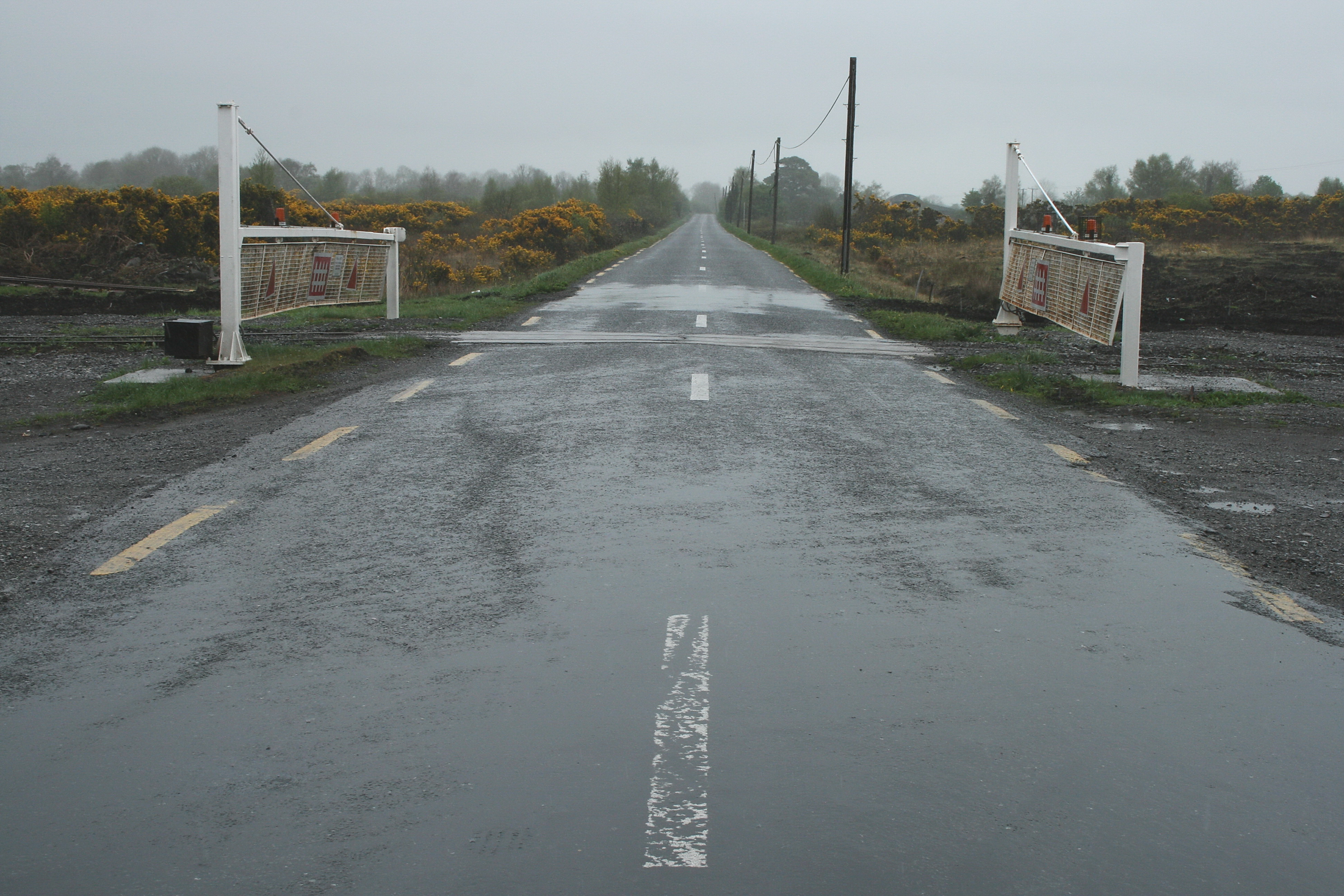
- R436 at Bord na Móna railway crossing

Route information
- Length: 25 km (16 mi)

Location
- Country: Ireland
- Primary destinations: County Westmeath; Kilbeggan – leave the R446; County Offaly; Clara – (R420) Crosses the River Brosna; Ballycumber – Crosses the River Brosna; Lemanaghan; Ferbane – terminates at the N62

Highway system
- Roads in Ireland; Motorways; Primary; Secondary; Regional

The R436 road is a regional road in Ireland linking Kilbeggan, County Westmeath and Ferbane, County Offaly. It passes through the town of Clara, County Offaly, Ballycumber, through cutaway peat bogs to Ferbane where it terminates at the N62. The road is 25 km (16 mi) long.

== See also ==
- Roads in Ireland
- National primary road
- National secondary road
