= Internationaler Naturpark Bourtanger Moor-Bargerveen =

Nature reserve in northern Netherlands and Germany

- Bourtanger Moor-Bargerveen International Nature Park
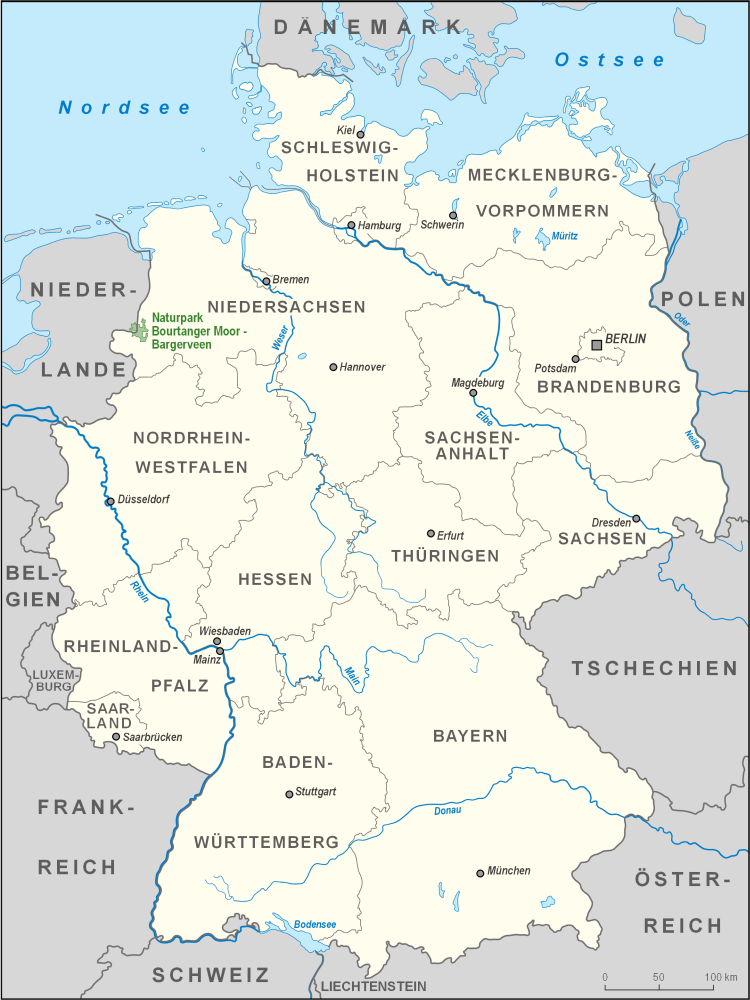
- Location of Bourtanger Moor-Bargerveen International Nature Park.
- Location: Lower Saxony, Germany; Drenthe, Netherlands
- Nearest city: Twist, Germany
- Coordinates: 52.656°N 7.09°E
- Established: 2006

The Internationaler Naturpark Bourtanger Moor-Bargerveen (engl. Bourtanger Moor-Bargerveen International Nature Park) is a nature reserve in the west of the German state Lower Saxony as well as in the North-East of the Netherlands. Mostly this nature reserve is spread out over the German counties Emsland, Grafschaft Bentheim and the Dutch province Drenthe. The landscape within the nature park is characterised by big peat areas, heather, small lakes and a very low human population density. The Bourtanger Moor-Bargerveen International Nature Park was founded on June 1, 2006.

== Bourtanger Moor ==
Bourtanger Moor, the German part of the reserve, has a size of around 140 km^{2} (54 mi^{2}). Originally Bourtanger Moor had a size of 3,000 km^{2} (1,200 mi^{2}) which shows that nowadays the remaining part covers just a small area of its former dimension.

The nature reserve is the home of several special plants like common cottongrass and drosera and endangered animals like the viviparous lizard, grass snake, short-eared owl and European nightjar can be found in this reserve.

== Bargerveen ==
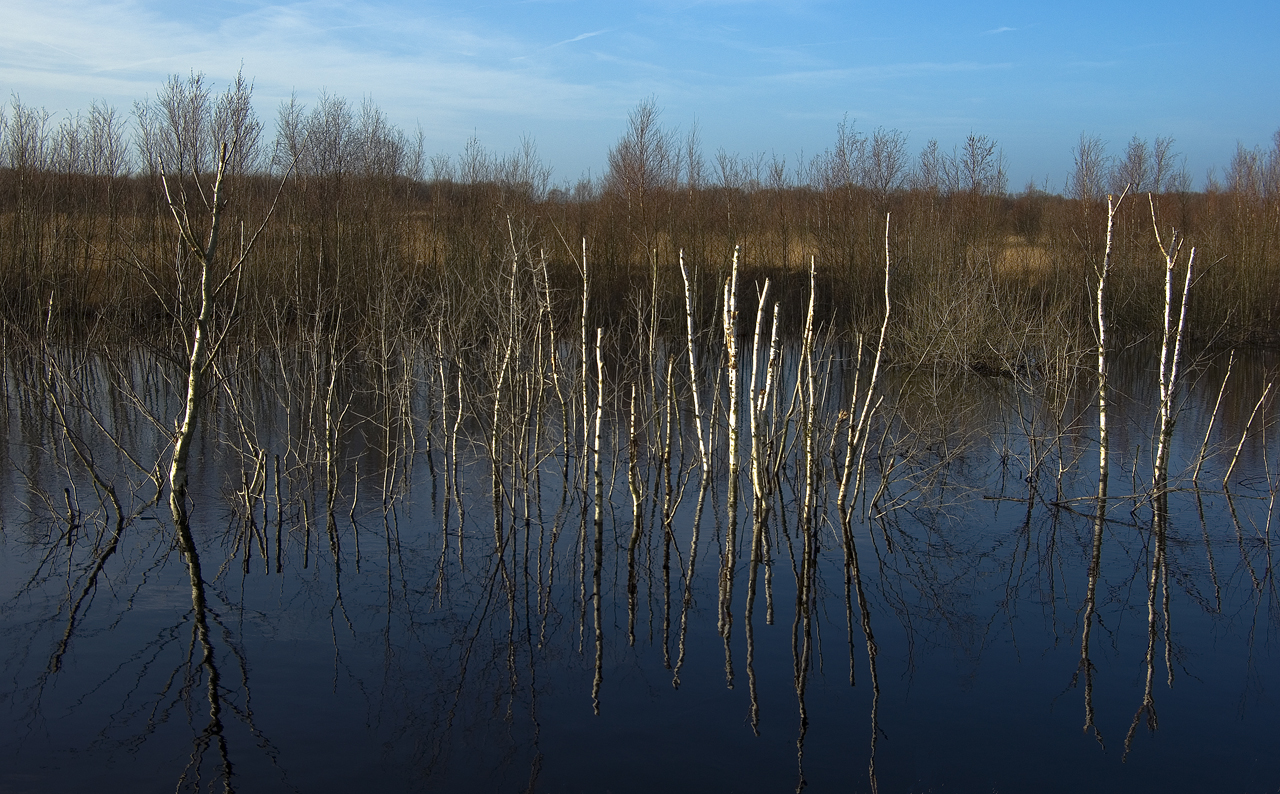
Bargerveen Nature Reserve

The Dutch part of the reserve was designated a protected area in 1992 as Natuurreservaat Bargerveen (Bargerveen Nature Reserve). It has a size of 2,600 ha (6,400 acres) and consists mainly of bog.
