= Placidus Timmons =

Brother Placidus, O.S.F., (17 April 1948 – 22 January 1997) was an Irish Catholic Franciscan Religious Brother and missionary who was shot to death at the mission school he headed in the Rift Valley Province, Kenya, in January 1997 by the local police chief.

== Early life ==
He was born Larry Timmons in Delvin, County Westmeath, Ireland. As a young man he became a member of the Franciscan Brothers of Ireland at Clara, County Offaly. Upon entering the novitiate of that religious institute he took the name Placidus. As well as being furnished with a theological education, he held a degree from the National University of Ireland at Galway.

== Missionary ==
In 1982, Timmons went to Kenya on missionary work, and helped oversee the construction of churches and schools in the Diocese of Nakuru. He was a highly respected schoolteacher, and worked for many years to obtain better political rights for his students and parishioners. Shortly before his death, Timmons protested the government's apparent practice of issuing new voting cards preferentially in areas that supported President Daniel arap Moi of the Kenya African National Union.

In the early morning of 22 January 1997, approximately 15 armed burglars raided the secondary school at Lare headed by Timmons, the latest in a series of violent and deadly raids that month on Franciscan establishments. Despite poor rural communication, local police arrived quickly; one of them, Francis Kimanzi Mbaya, was a man whom Timmons had accused of corruption. Mbaya fired repeatedly at Timmons, killing him instantly. The burglars were never found or arrested, and the police maintained that Timmons was shot accidentally.

The Nakuru Diocese claimed in the local newspaper that the police had arranged the raid themselves in order to silence Timmons after a confrontation with local officials over bribery and voting discrimination. The diocese administrator accused the authorities of not giving enough attention to the circumstances of the death or evidence that pointed toward a conspiracy. Mbaya was charged in the incident, but his trial was halted amid requests by Ireland and the European Union for further investigation.

The government's investigation ended in December 2000. It found that Mbaya had a chance to recognize Timmons, had not asked Timmons to surrender before firing, and had continued firing after Timmons dropped to the ground and pleaded with him to stop. It further criticized the local police for failing to investigate the incident and releasing suspects improperly. Mbaya was convicted of manslaughter in July 2004. He was sentenced to ten years in prison.

== Legacy ==
Timmons was buried in his native country on the grounds of the Franciscan monastery at Clara, County Offaly. In 2000, a memorial plaque was also erected at the Church of the Assumption in his home town of Delvin.
