= Bargerveen Nature Reserve =

Nature reserve in Drenthe, Netherlands

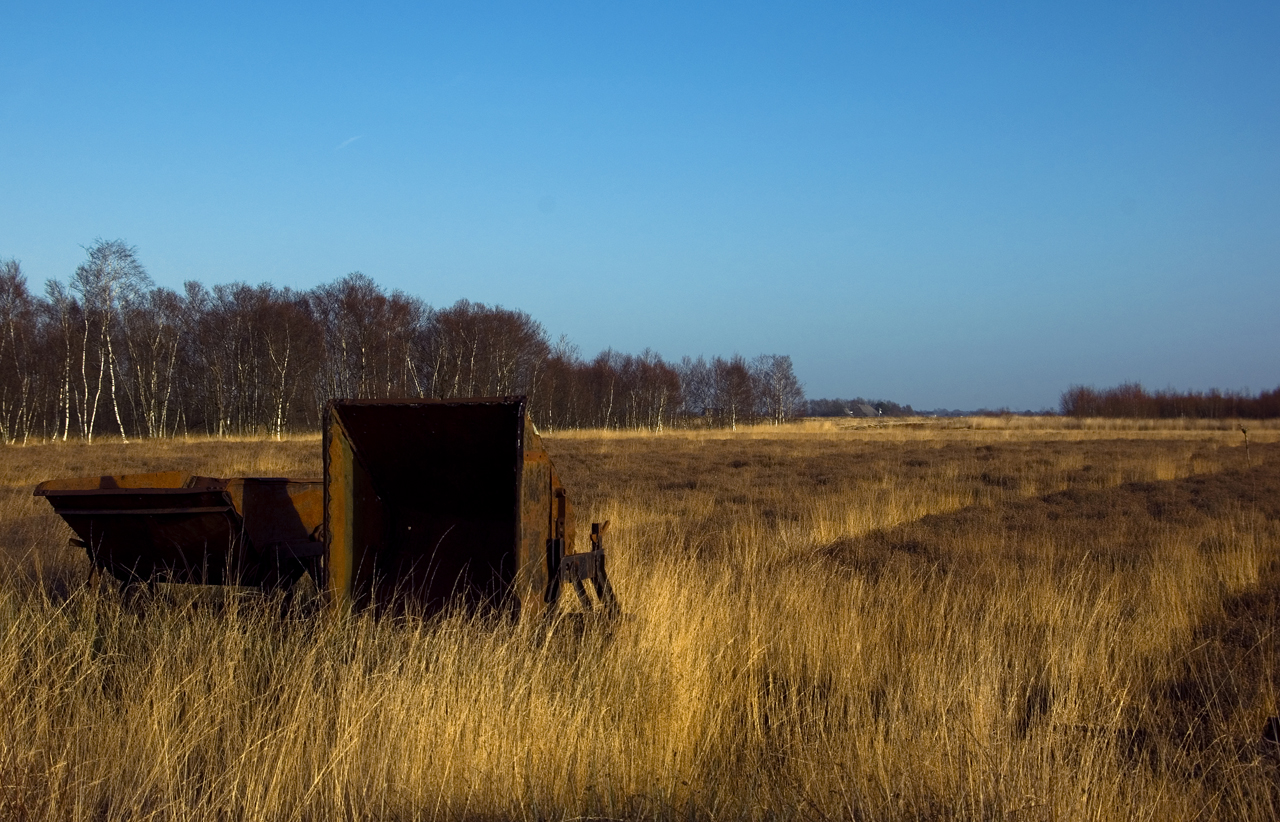

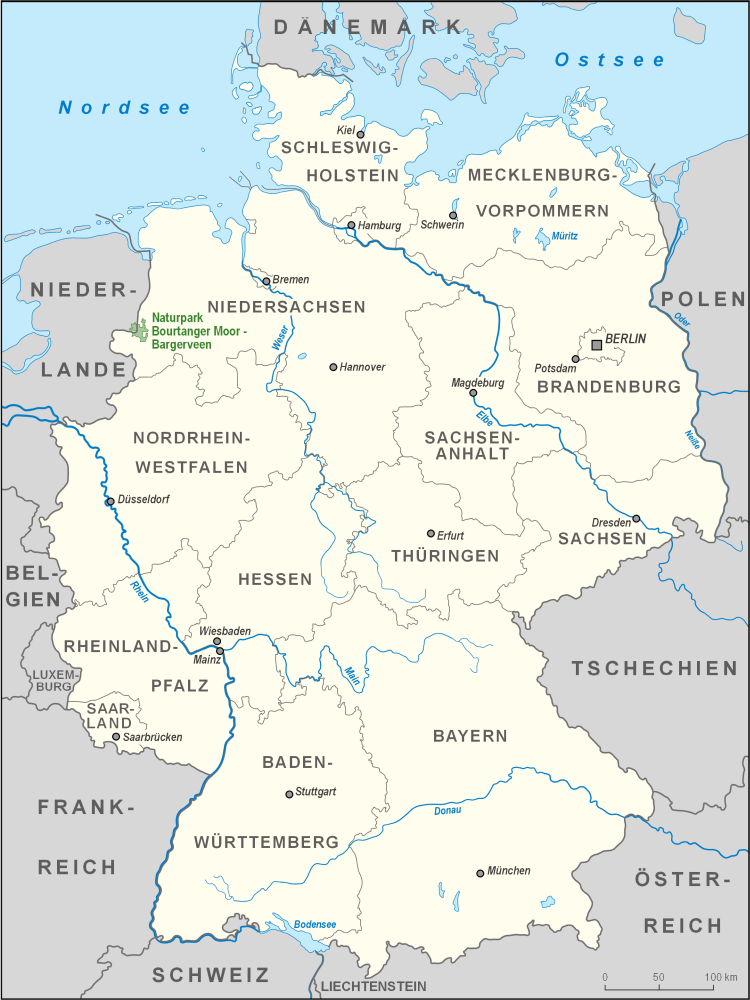
- Location of Internationaler Naturpark Bourtanger Moor-Bargerveen.
- Location: Drenthe, Netherlands
- Coordinates: 52.677°N 7.03°E
- Area: 6 km^{2} (2.3 mi^{2})
- Established: 1992

Ramsar Wetland
- Official name: Bargerveen
- Designated: 30 December 1992
- Reference no.: 581

Bargerveen Nature Reserve is a nature reserve in the Dutch province of Drenthe that has been included in the Natura 2000 ecological network. Since 2006 it is part of the Internationaler Naturpark Bourtanger Moor-Bargerveen (engl. Bourtanger Moor-Bargerveen International Nature Park), a nature reserve located on both sides of the border between the Netherlands and Germany. Most of the transboundary nature reserve, some 134 km^{2} (52 mi^{2}), lies in Germany, in the west of the state of Lower Saxony. The sparsely populated landscape consists of large peat areas, heather, and small lakes.

The Dutch part of the nature reserve was founded in 1992 as Natuurreservaat Bargerveen. It was designated as a Ramsar site (a wetland of international importance) the following year. Bargerveen has a size of 21 km^{2} (8.1 mi^{2}). It consists mainly of peat bog.

== Bog restoration ==
Some of the wetland area had become degraded, and, after peat extraction was discontinued, restoration work was needed to improve water retention. The project had the objective of creating active raised bog and was coordinated by Staatsbosbeheer, the government agency that manages the site. The work was supported by the European Union's LIFE programme in the years 2003–2006, but it was noted that the full effects would be seen in the longer term.

Bargerveen has been twinned with two Irish Ramsar Sites, Clara Bog and Raheenmore Bog, which were identified as needing active management measures.

== Flora and fauna ==
Bargerveen is a Special Protection Area for bird-life, and is home to large numbers of wintering bean geese. It is also an Important Bird Area: "trigger" species are the spotted crake and the red-backed shrike.

It is also a Special Area of Conservation.

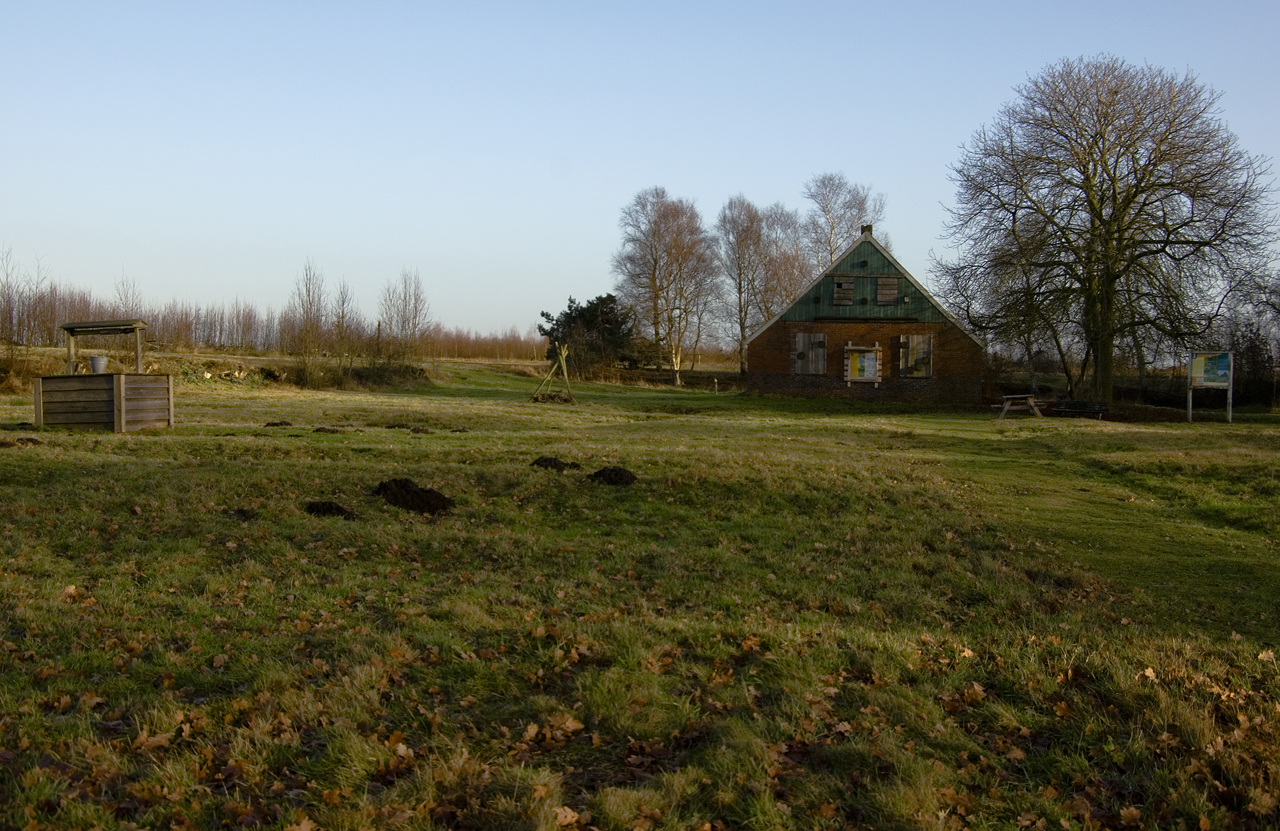
Now an insect hotel, this house was previously occupied by a family, the last people to live at Bargerveen.

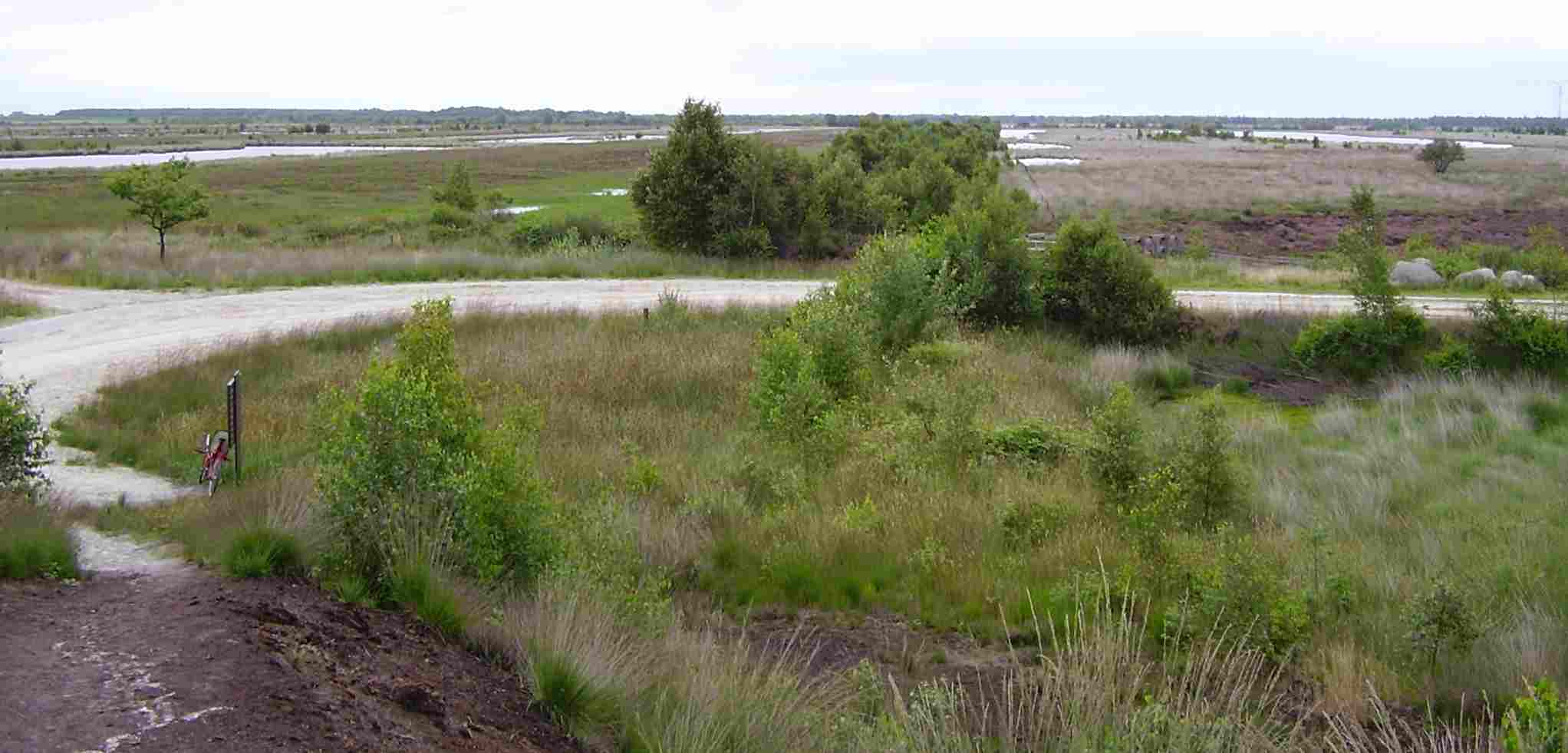
Bargerveen Nature Reserve

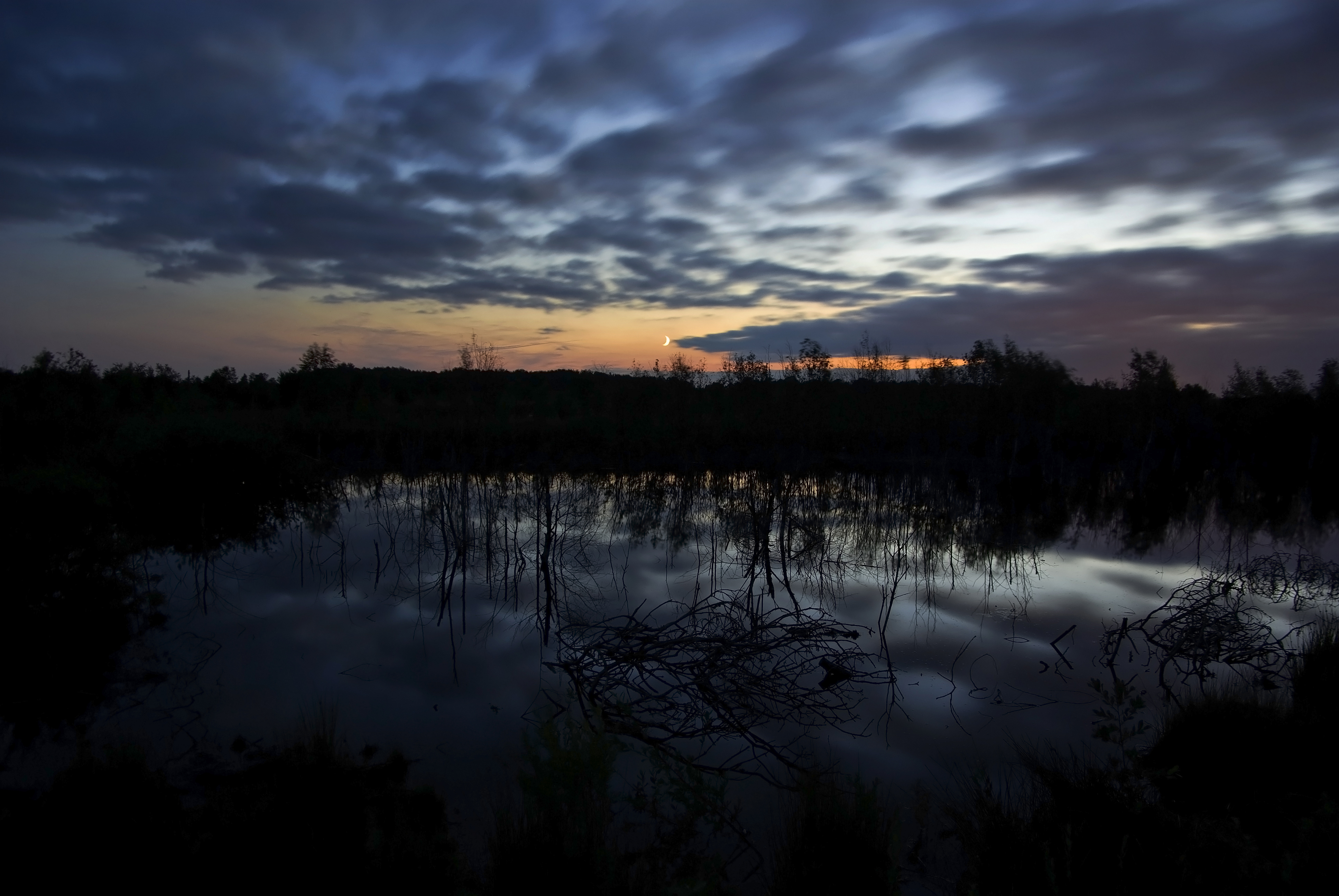
Bargerveen Nature Reserve at night
