= Nieuw-Dordrecht =

- Village
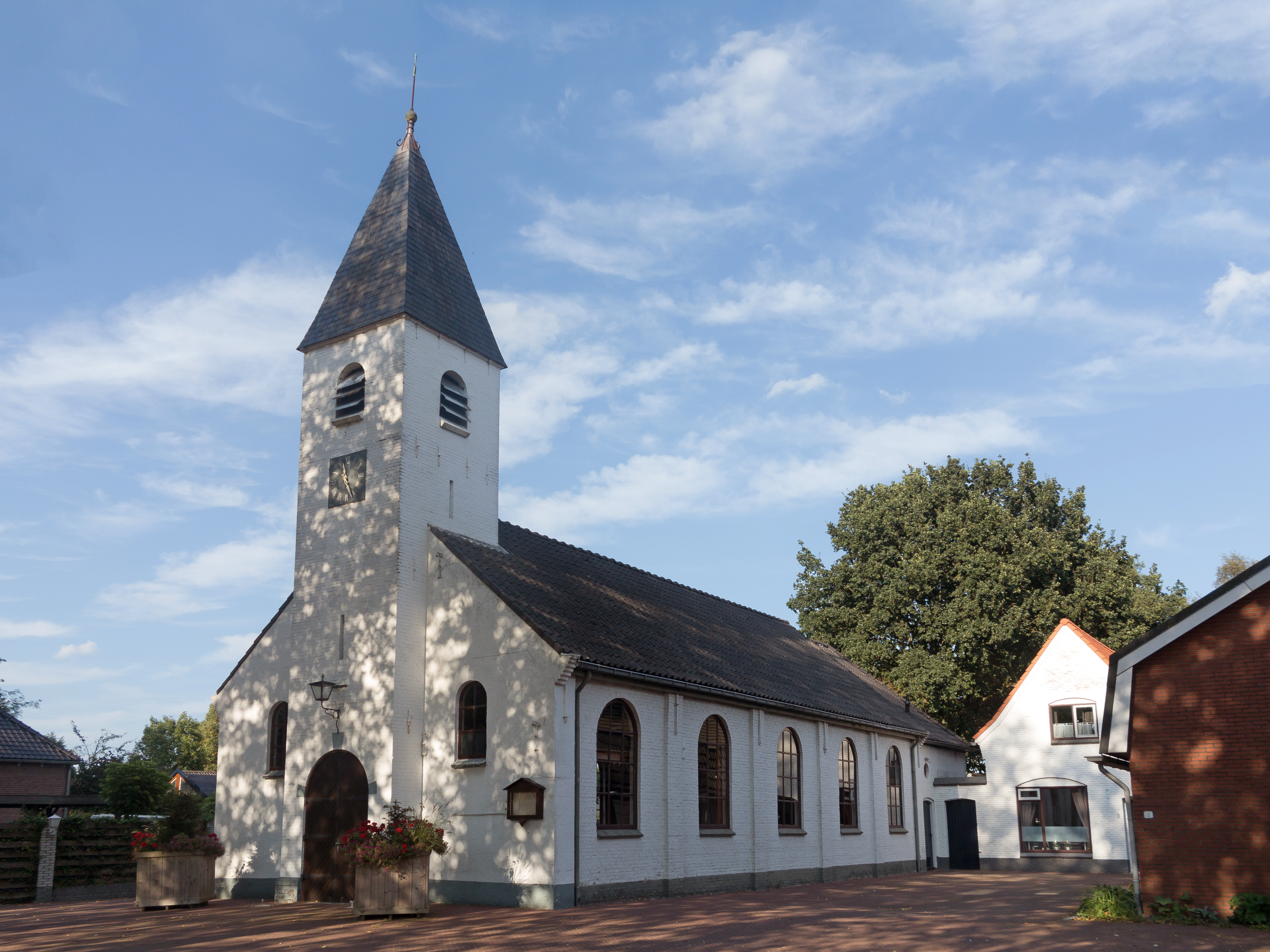
- Nieuw-Dordrecht, reformed church

- Location in province of Drenthe in the Netherlands Nieuw-Dordrecht (Netherlands)
- Coordinates: 52°45′N 6°58′E
- Country: Netherlands
- Province: Drenthe
- Municipality: Emmen
- Established: 1856

Area
  - Total: 8.31 km^{2} (3.21 sq mi)
- Elevation: 23 m (75 ft)

Population (2021)
  - Total: 2,080
  - Density: 250/km^{2} (648/sq mi)
- Postal code: 7885
- Dialing code: 0591

Nieuw-Dordrecht is a village in the Netherlands and it is part of the Emmen municipality in Drenthe. The village is home to Museum Collectie Brands, a museum which houses the extensive collection of items collected and gathered by Jans Brands.

== History ==
Nieuw-Dordrecht was established in 1856 to excavate the peat east of the Oranjekanaal by Drentsche Veen en Middenkanaal Maatschappij, a company based in Dordrecht. In 1932, it was home to 832 people. In the 1950s, the economy became based on the textile industry.

In 2011, Museum Collectie Brands opened in Nieuw-Dordrecht. It contains the collection of Jan Brands who collected over 20,000 object and more than 50,000 books which covered his entire farm.

== Gallery ==
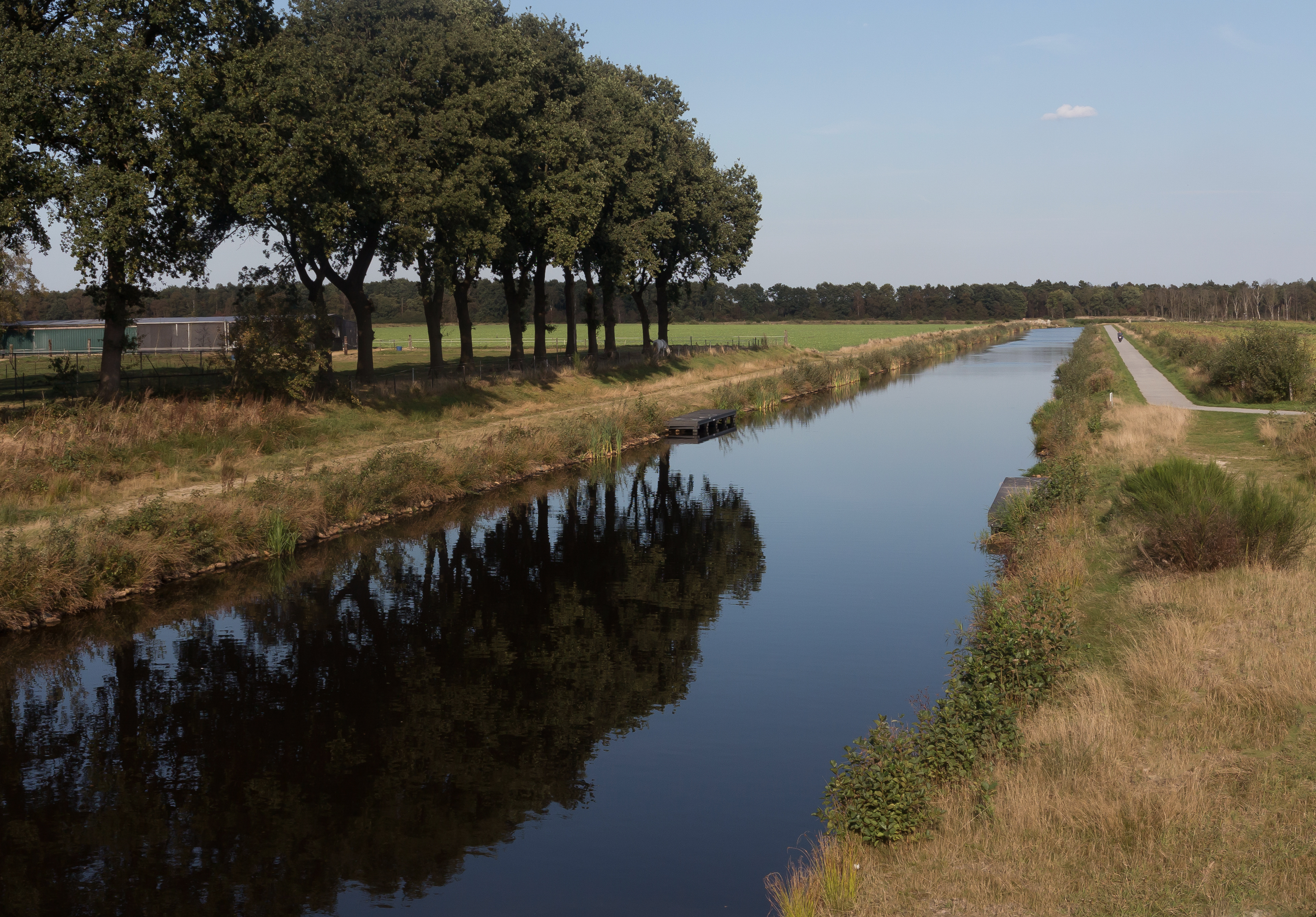
Between Nieuw-Dordrecht and Klazienaveen, the ditch in the peat landscape

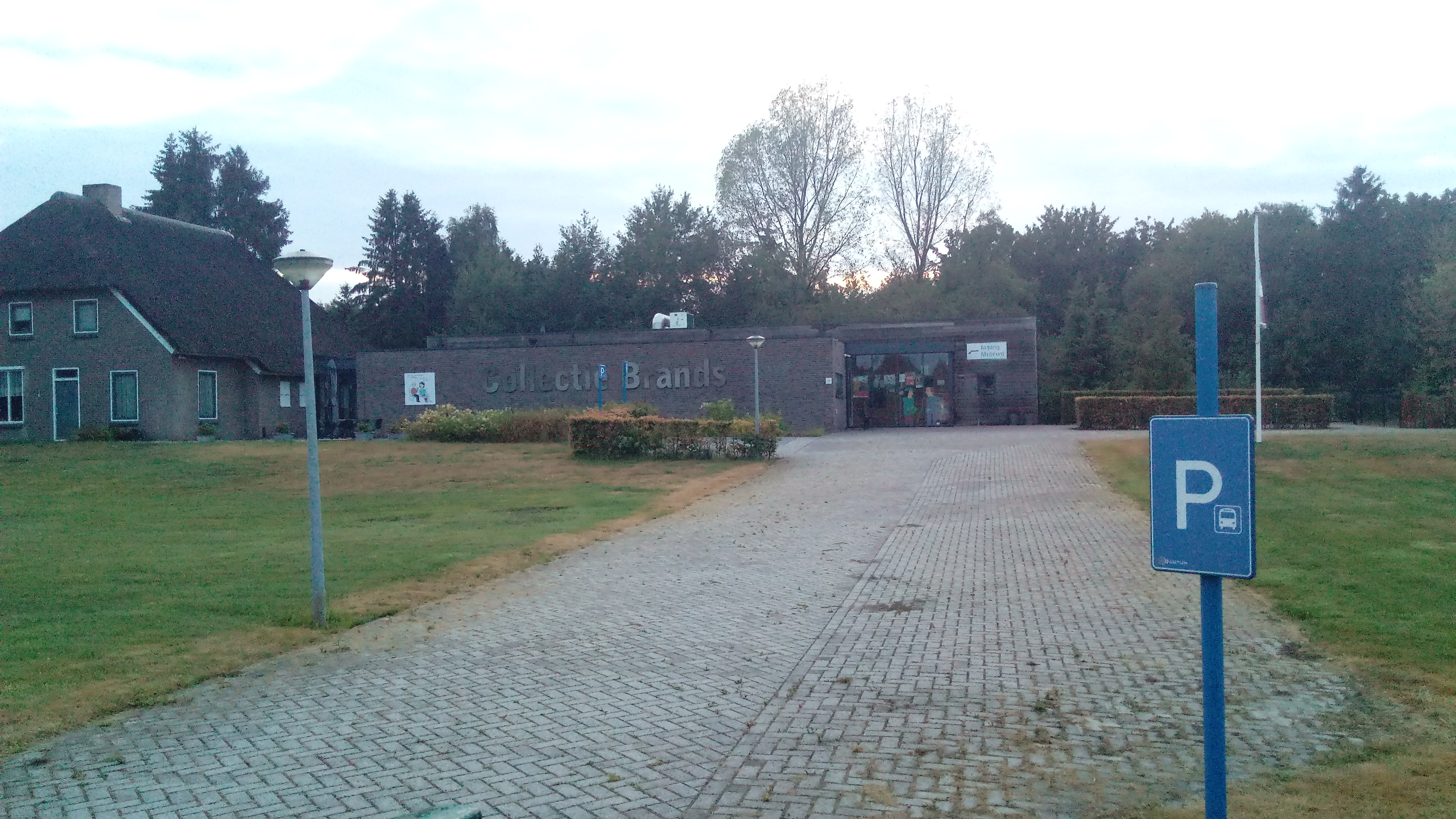
Museum Collectie Brands

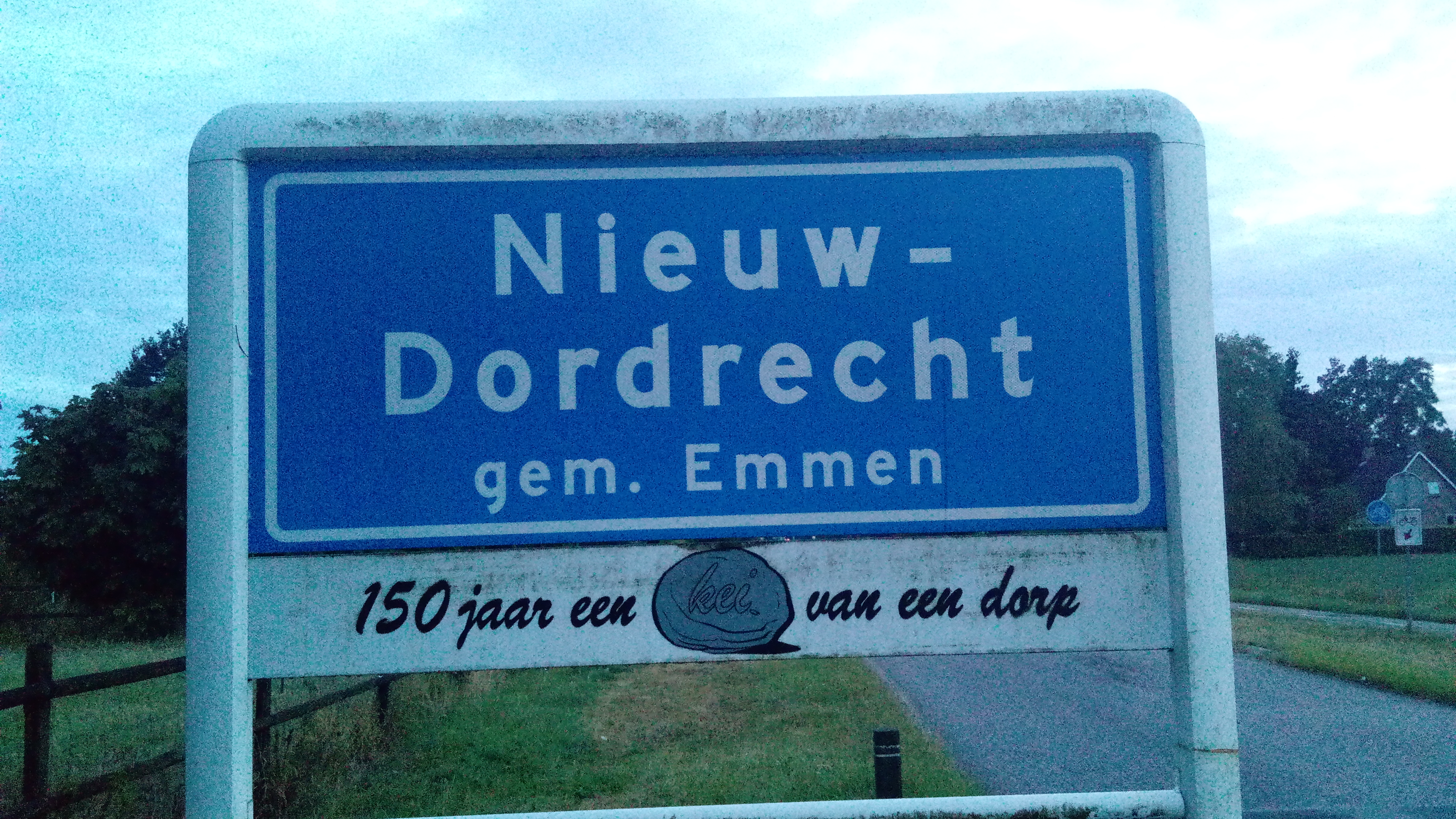
Town limits sign
