= Tubber, County Offaly =

Tubber An Tobar Tober
- Village
- Location within Ireland
- Coordinates: 53°22′54″N 7°40′21″W
- Country: Ireland
- Province: Leinster
- County: County Offaly
- Time zone: UTC+0 (WET)
  - Summer (DST): UTC-1 (IST (WEST))

Tubber (Irish: an Tobar, meaning 'the well') is a village in County Offaly, Ireland.

The Roman Catholic parish of Tubber spans the civil parishes of Kilcumreragh and Kilmanaghan. St. Manchan's National School in Tubber is named after St. Manchan, the local saint. His name is also reflected in that of the parish of Kilmonaghan and the old cemetery and church in Kilmonaghan.

The Tubber G.A.A. (Gaelic Athletic Association) Club was established in April 1979, and took over responsibility for Tubber Hall. Due to difficulties with the lease, the club later obtained and improved a field and built dressing rooms, officially opened in May 1989. Since then several improvements have been made to the facilities.

Tubber is also home to the Cat and Bagpipes pub, which is located in the centre of the village.

The village is served by the no. 73 Bus Eireann regional service between Athlone and Waterford, Local Link 815 bus between Tullamore and Athlone and also the no. 11159 bus to Athlone TUS, which operates during college term. There are now up to 9 weekday return bus services serving Tubber, with up 10 to Tullamore.

Tubber plays a prominent role in the film debut of Oscar winner Cillian Murphy. The short film, Quando (1997), depicts the village having its first Queen of The Heather Festival.
