= Clara, County Offaly =

Town in County Offaly, Ireland

Clara Clóirtheach
- Town
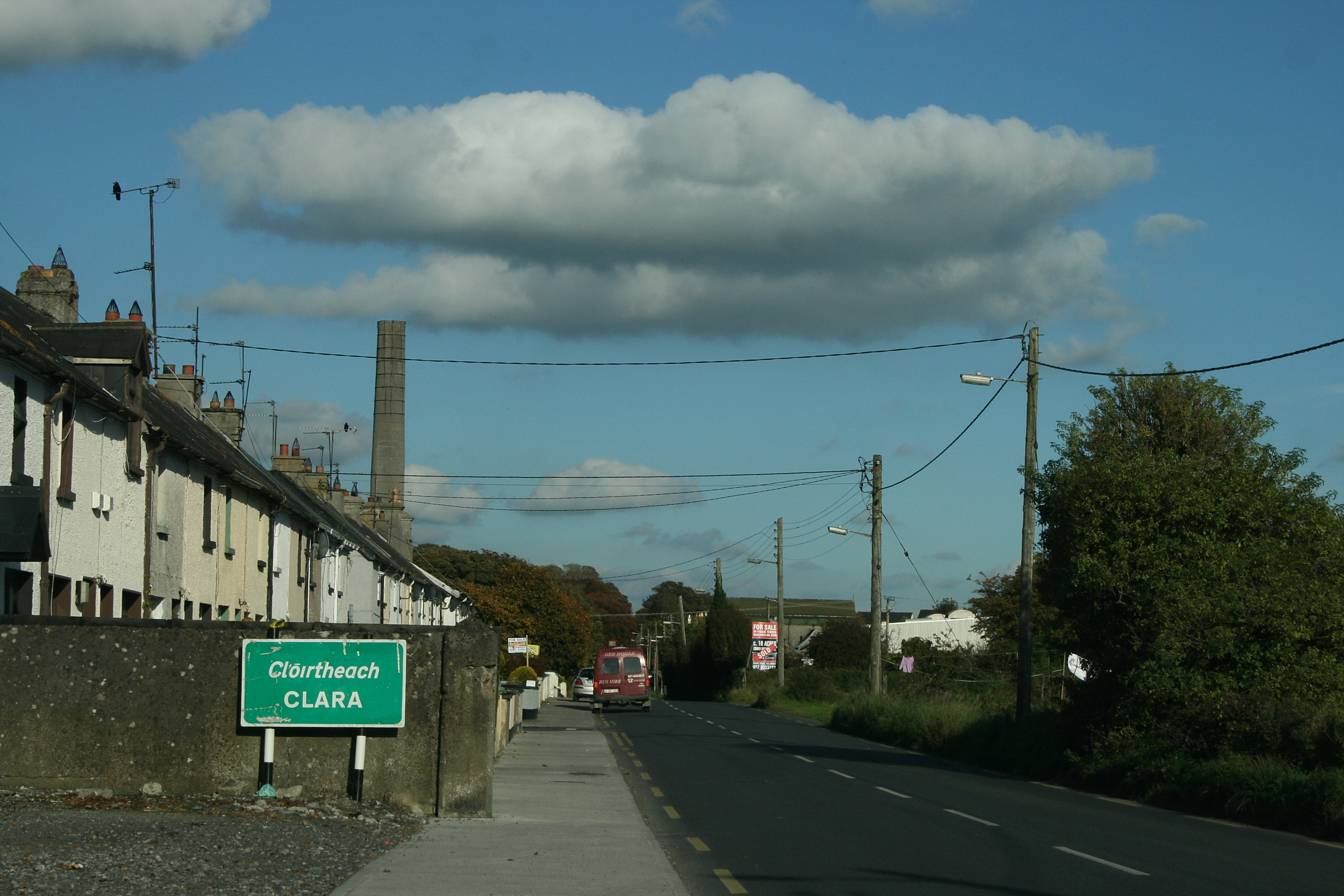
- Clara on the R436

- Location in Ireland
- Coordinates: 53.342661°N 7.613525°W
- Country: Ireland
- Province: Leinster
- County: Offaly
- Elevation: 57 m (187 ft)

Population (2022)
  - Total: 3,403
- Irish Grid Reference: N254325

Historical population
Year	Pop.	±%
1821	1,174	—
1831	1,149	−2.1%
1841	1,357	+18.1%
1851	996	−26.6%
1861	915	−8.1%
1871	832	−9.1%
1881	956	+14.9%
1891	1,092	+14.2%
1901	1,111	+1.7%
1911	1,096	−1.4%
1926	1,726	+57.5%
1936	1,590	−7.9%
1946	1,635	+2.8%
1951	1,684	+3.0%
1956	2,628	+56.1%
1961	2,477	−5.7%
1966	2,424	−2.1%
1971	2,156	−11.1%
1981	2,596	+20.4%
1986	2,736	+5.4%
1991	2,505	−8.4%
1996	2,464	−1.6%
2002	2,704	+9.7%
2006	3,001	+11.0%
2011	3,242	+8.0%
2016	3,336	+2.9%
2022	3,403	+2.0%

Clara (Irish: Clóirtheach; sometimes translated locally as Clárach) is a town on the River Brosna in County Offaly, Ireland. It is the 10th largest town in the midlands of Ireland. The town had a population of 3,403 as of the 2022 census.

Clara's local services include churches, schools, a branch of the Laois & Offaly Education and Training Board, a library, doctor's surgery, medical centre, pharmacies, health centre, family resource centre, shops, post office, credit union, hair and beauty salons, barbers, garages, pubs, eateries, a playground, public swimming pool, pitch and putt club, GAA club, and Clara Bog Visitor Centre. There is a Garda (police) station and fire station in the town, while the Midlands Regional Hospital is located approximately eleven kilometres away in Tullamore.

== Geography ==
Clara is situated in the north of County Offaly near the border with County Westmeath, on the regional road R420 some 12 kilometres northwest of Tullamore. Clara Bog is located approximately 2.5 kilometres to the southeast of Clara town. Situated on a plain (Clóirtheach meaning plain or level place), the town is in reality an urban centre surrounded by a series of mini-villages. The town is connected to the River Shannon by one of its tributaries, the River Brosna. Clara is the modern name of what was previously known as the Barony of Kilcoursey and Parish of Kilbride. The earliest known map of Clara dates from the Ordnance Survey of 1838.

== History ==
=== Early history ===
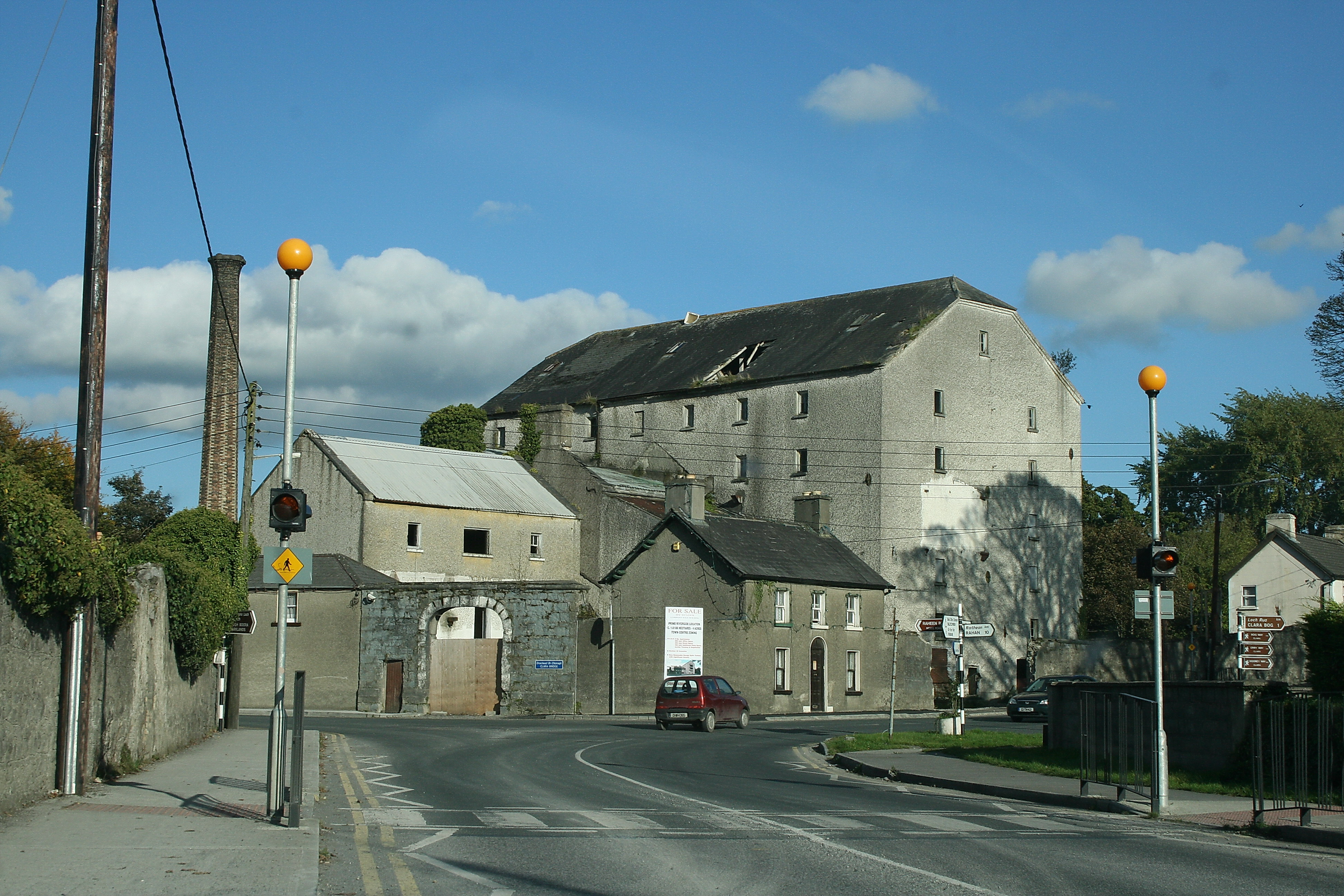
Industrial heritage in Clara

While the town as we know it today was established by Quakers in the mid-18th century, there is evidence of community habitation for some time. Situated on the Esker Riada, the ancient thoroughfare which connected the east and west coasts of Ireland, numerous ring forts are to be found in the countryside surrounding the town suggesting that the early settlement may have been a staging post for travellers. Just outside the town in Kilbride, the remnants of a 12th-century monastery testify to the existence of a religious presence. According to tradition this monastery was founded by St Brigid of Kildare (d.c 525 AD) and is linked by an ancient road to Durrow Abbey founded by St Colm Cille (St Columba). St Brigid's original monastery, founded shortly after her religious profession – her first foundation, would have been constructed in wood and consisted of a number of buildings surrounding a central church. These buildings were replaced by stone structures in the 12th century. The original parish was named after St Brigid: Kilbride (from Cill Bhride: the Church of Brigid). The ruins of an ancient church are to be found not far from the monastery at the foot of a hill (Chapel Hill) and this may have been the original parish church.

=== Development and industrialisation ===
Politically the family which had dominion over the area was the Sinnach O'Catharniagh (Fox O'Carney) clan; they were referred to as the Muinter Tadgain (people of Tadgain). The O'Catharniagh were princes of Teffia (an area in County Westmeath). The ruins of their castle, Lehinch Castle, are to be found on a hill in Kilcoursey, less than a mile from the town centre. The McAuley family are also associated with the Barony of Kilcoursey. Mass rocks are also to be found in the hills outside the town, having provided secret places for Catholics to worship during the persecution which followed the Reformation.

The Fox family owned much of the district up until the 1650s. Following the involvement of the Chieftain, Hubert Fox in a rebellion in the 1640s – he was defending Catholic interests against the Puritan Oliver Cromwell who came to Ireland to suppress uprisings against English rule. Ironically, in 1599, Fox's father, also Hubert, had signed an agreement of "surrender and regrant" with the English crown to avoid the complete destruction of his estates following the Nine Years' War: the lands were returned to Fox senior in recognition of his fealty. Hubert junior, however, was not so inclined, preferring to stand by the family's traditional allegiance. Cromwell proved victorious and Fox lost his lands which were given to Samuel Rust, a Cromwellian soldier. He, in turn, sold the district to two families – the Armstrongs and the Bagots. The Armstrongs settled in the town and would eventually establish industries, including a linen factory. Andrew Armstrong (1727–1802) built the neo-classical Clara House on the west side of the town in the 1770s. One member of the Armstrong family, John Armstrong, uncle of Andrew, was Governor of Menorca and author of a history of the island in 1752. Andrew Armstrong died in 1802 and the estates were sold to the Cox family.

In 1825, the Goodbody family moved to Clara from Mountmellick and introduced industry into the town, trading under the name of J & L F Goodbody. Buying flour mills at Erry and Charlestown, they developed the river Brosna and used it to harness power for their factories. In 1864 the Goodbodys started a jute factory at Clashawaun. The jute was imported from India and the resulting bags were exported worldwide. In the last decades of the 20th century, the factories declined and the last Goodbody factory closed in 1984. The family had provided the people of Clara with employment in a number of areas: factory work, domestic service and farming. Other industries in the town included flour mills, distilleries, a brewery, manufacturers of tobacco, soap, candles, and clothes together with food processing companies.

At the end of the 19th century and for much of the 20th century, the town's prosperity led to a number of building projects. There are several stately houses in the town and surrounding countryside as the various members of the Goodbody family set up their households. Thanks to Catholic Emancipation in 1829 a more prominent Catholic church was built on the outskirts of the town in Charlestown, but this proved too small and in the 1880s the parish, now St Brigid's Parish, built a neo-gothic church in the centre of the town on one side of the main square: a relic of St Brigid is preserved in the church. To cater for the needs of the townspeople, two religious orders founded communities and schools: the Franciscan Brothers arrived in 1821 and the Sisters of Mercy some years later. Other religious buildings in the town consist of St Brigid's parish church for the Church of Ireland community (Anglican Communion) looking down over the fair green and the Friends' Meeting Hall (Quaker) which is no longer in use. As the town prospered so did social life, and a number of cultural and sporting associations were founded in the town.

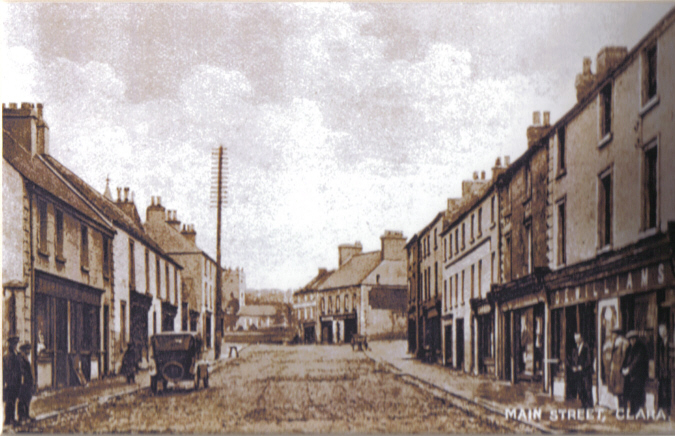
Main Street Clara c. 1915

=== Death of Father Niall Molloy ===
Father Niall Molloy (14 April 1933 - 8 July 1985) was a Catholic priest who was killed in mysterious circumstances in Kilcoursey House in Clara, County Offaly, the home of Richard and Therese Flynn. When the Garda Síochána arrived, they found that there were signs of violence in Flynn's bedroom and that there was a large bloodstain on the carpet. The priest died the day after the wedding of the Flynns' daughter Maureen. Flynn was charged with manslaughter and with actual bodily harm, but the judge at his trial, a family friend, directed the jury to give a 'not guilty' verdict. In 2011, a medical examination of brain tissue kept after the original post-mortem revealed that there was a high probability that the priest was alive up to six hours after the initial attack and therefore may have lived if medical help had been summoned. Molloy was parish priest of Castlecoote, County Roscommon at the time of his death.

== Transport ==
Clara railway station opened on 3 October 1859, and located beside Railway View Housing Estate. It is on the main Dublin to Ballina / Westport / Galway railway line. Clara was once a railway junction, with a branch to Streamstown on the now disused Athlone–Mullingar link. There was also a railway junction west of Clara serving the Banagher branch line. Clara is also served by the M6 Dublin/Galway motorway with junction 6 less than 5 minutes drive from the town centre. In 2008 there was a proposal for a small regional airport in the area, which later fell through

== Sport ==
Clara's local GAA club is involved in Gaelic football and hurling from under 8 to senior level. Clara also has a soccer club and an athletic club. The town has two swimming pools, a pitch and putt club, and a powerlifting club. A golf driving range is located in the town also with the Esker Hills golf club located just outside the town. There is a local equestrian centre and sports centre also.

== Special Area of Conservation ==
Two kilometres from the town centre lies Clara Bog, a raised bog which contains rare flora. It was considered for nomination as a UNESCO World Heritage Site.

The Clara Bog visitor centre is located beside the town's library. A bog boardwalk (Accessible from Ballinough, off Tullamore road) is very popular with local walkers but is virtually unknown to visitors. The boardwalk allows walkers to safely cross the surface of the bog. A much shorter, but more accessible bog boardwalk is also located 2 km from Clara on the main Rahan road.

== Notable people ==
- Sam Clyne, Vincentian priest and president of St Pat's, Drumcondra
- Brian Cowen, Taoiseach from 2008 to 2011.
- Brigid of Kildare, patron saint of the parish of Clara. The local Catholic church preserves a relic of the saint.
- Shane Lowry, professional golfer who won the 2009 Irish Open (as an amateur) and the 2019 Open Championship.
- Guglielmo Marconi (1874–1937), conducted some of his radiotelegraphy experiments in Clara.
- Vivian Mercier, literary historian.
- Declan Recks, television and film director.
- Placidus Timmons, OSF, Irish Catholic Franciscan missionary.
