= 1980 Tipperary Senior Hurling Championship =

Annual hurling competition season

- Dates: 10 August - 28 September 1980
- Teams: 8
- Champions: Roscrea (6th title); Kevin Brady (captain); Willie O'Reilly (manager)
- Runners-up: Kilruane MacDonaghs; Denis O'Meara (captain); Len Gaynor (manager)

Tournament statistics
- Matches played: 7
- Goals scored: 28 (4 per match)
- Points scored: 161 (23 per match)
- Top scorer(s): Francis Loughnane (3-19)

The 1980 Tipperary Senior Hurling Championship was the 89th staging of the Tipperary Senior Hurling Championship since its establishment by the Tipperary County Board in 1887.

Kilruane MacDonaghs were the defending champions.

On 28 September 1980, Roscrea won the championship after a 3–11 to 2–13 defeat of Kilruane MacDonaghs in the final at Semple Stadium. It was their sixth championship title overall and their first title since 1973. It remains their last championship triumph.

== Results ==
=== Quarter-finals ===
10 August 1980 Quarter-final	Roscrea	5-12 - 1-07	Carrick Davins	Semple Stadium
	F Loughnane 2-2, J Tynan 1-1, J Butler 1-1, J Stone 0-4, G O'Connor 0-2, J Shanahan 0-1.		R Walsh 1-0, T Roche 0-2, J Kennedy 0-2, S Power 0-1, P Tobin 0-1, T Murphy 0-1.

10 August 1980 Quarter-final	Kilruane MacDonaghs	3-18 - 0-07	Ballingarry	Semple Stadium
	Gilbert Williams 2-2, S O'Meara 1-3, J Williams 0-4, Ger Williams 0-3, S Hennessy 0-3, L O'Shea 0-2, E O'Shea 0-1.		M Brennan 0-4, M McGrath 0-1, J Molloy 0-1, T Brennan 0-1.

10 August 1980 Quarter-final	Thurles Sarsfields	3-10 - 0-14	Cashel King Cormacs	Boherlahan Grounds
	B Byrne 2-1, P McCormack 0-5, B O'Neill 1-1, J Burke 0-2, F Murphy 0-1.		P O'Connor 0-4, M Byrne 0-3, B Bonnar 0-2, J White 0-2, P Fitzelle 0-2, T Grogan 0-1.

10 August 1980 Quarter-final	Seán Treacys	2-11 - 0-08	Drom-Inch	Boherlahan Grounds
	J Carey 1-5, P Quigley 0-4, D Ryan 1-0, P Ryan 0-2.

=== Semi-finals ===
24 August 1980 Semi-final	Roscrea	1-16 - 1-10	Thurles Sarsfields	MacDonagh Park
	F Loughnane 0-10, J Tynan 1-1, P Queally 0-2, J Stone 0-1, G O'Connor 0-1, K O'Connor 0-1.		Barry 1-1, P Byrne 0-3, P Maher 0-1, J O'Dwyer 0-1, P McCormack 0-1, M Gleeson 0-1, J Duggan 0-1, F Murphy 0-1.

24 August 1980 Semi-final	Kilruane MacDonaghs	5-13 - 2-11	Seán Treacy's	MacDonagh Park
	S Hennessy 0-7, L O'Shea 2-0, S O'Meara 1-2, Ger Williams 1-2, Gilbert Williams 1-0, J Williams 0-2.		P Quigley 1-4, J Carey 1-4, D Ryan 0-1, PJ Caplis 0-1, D Carey 0-1.

=== Final ===
28 September 1980 Final	Roscrea	3-11 - 2-13	Kilruane MacDonaghs	Semple Stadium
	F Loughnane 1-7, J Stone 1-1, R Ryan 1-0, G O'Connor 0-1, L Spooner 0-1, J Tynan 0-1.		E O'Shea 2-1, S Hennessy 0-5, J Williams 0-4, L O'Shea 0-2, Gilbert Williams 0-1.	Referee: M Brady (Moyne)

== Championship statistics ==
=== Top scorers ===
Overall

Rank	Player	Club	Tally	Total	Matches	Average
1	Francis Loughnane	Roscrea	3-19	28	3	9.33
2	John Carey	Seán Treacys	2-09	15	2	7.50
2	Séamus Hennessy	Kilruane MacDonaghs	0-15	15	3	5.00
4	Gilbert Williams	Kilruane MacDonaghs	3-03	12	3	4.00
5	Seán O'Meara	Kilruane MacDonaghs	2-05	11	3	3.66
5	Pat Quigley	Seán Treacys	1-08	11	2	5.50
7	Paul Byrne	Thurles Sarsfields	2-04	10	2	5.00
7	Liam O'Shea	Kilruane MacDonaghs	2-04	10	3	3.33
7	Jim Williams	Kilruane MacDonaghs	2-04	10	3	3.33
10	Joe Tynan	Roscrea	2-03	9	3	3.00
10	John Stone	Roscrea	2-03	9	3	3.00

In a single game

Rank	Player	Club	Tally	Total	Opposition
1	Francis Loughnane	Roscrea	1-07	10	Kilruane MacDonaghs
1	Francis Loughnane	Roscrea	0-10	10	Thurles Sarsfields
3	Francis Loughnane	Roscrea	2-02	8	Carrick Davins
3	Gilbert Williams	Kilruane MacDonaghs	2-02	8	Ballingarry
3	John Carey	Seán Treacys	1-05	8	Drom-Inch
6	Paul Byrne	Thurles Sarsfields	2-01	7	Cashel King Cormacs
6	Eamon O'Shea	Kilruane MacDonaghs	2-01	7	Roscrea
6	John Carey	Seán Treacys	1-04	7	Kilruane MacDonaghs
6	Pat Quigley	Seán Treacys	1-04	7	Kilruane MacDonaghs
6	Séamus Hennessy	Kilruane MacDonaghs	0-07	7	Seán Treacys
