= Enda Hogan =

Irish hurler

Personal information
- Native name: Éanna Ó hÓgáin (Irish)
- Born: 1958 (age 67–68) Galway, Ireland
- Occupation: Farmer

Sport
- Sport: Hurling
- Position: Midfield
Club
- Years: Club
- Kilruane MacDonaghs
Club titles
- Tipperary titles: 4
- Munster titles: 1
- All-Ireland Titles: 1
Inter-county
Years	County	Apps (scores)
1981-1983	Tipperary	2 (0-00)
Inter-county titles
- Munster titles: 0
- All-Irelands: 0
- NHL: 0
- All Stars: 0

Enda K. Hogan (born 1958) is an Irish former hurler. At club level he played with Kilruane MacDonaghs and was also a member of the Tipperary senior hurling team.

== Career ==
Hogan first played hurling at juvenile and underage levels with the Kilruane MacDonaghs club. He was part of the club's under-21 team that won four consecutive Tipperary U21AHC titles. Hogan was at midfield on the Kilruane MacDonaghs team that won the All-Ireland Club Championship title in 1986, having earlier won four Tipperary SHC titles.

Hogan first appeared on the inter-county scene as a member of the Tipperary minor hurling team. He was an unused substitute when Tipperary beat Kilkenny by 16 points in the 1976 All-Ireland minor final. Hogan later won consecutive All-Ireland U21HC titles with the Tipperary under-21 team in 1978 and 1979. He joined the senior team in 1981 and made a number of appearances during the 1983 Munster SHC campaign.

== Honours ==
Kilruane MacDonaghs

- All-Ireland Senior Club Hurling Championship: 1986
- Munster Senior Club Hurling Championship: 1985
- Tipperary Senior Hurling Championship: 1977, 1978, 1979, 1985

Tipperary

- All-Ireland Under-21 Hurling Championship: 1978, 1979
- Munster Under-21 Hurling Championship: 1978, 1979
- All-Ireland Minor Hurling Championship: 1976
- Munster Minor Hurling Championship: 1976
