= Dinny O'Meara =

Irish hurler

Personal information
- Native name: Donncha Ó Meachair (Irish)
- Nickname: Beaker
- Born: 1952 (age 73–74) Cloughjordan, County Tipperary, Ireland
- Occupation: Heating contractor

Sport
- Sport: Hurling
- Position: Full-back
Club
- Years: Club
- Kilruane MacDonaghs
Club titles
- Tipperary titles: 4
- Munster titles: 1
- All-Ireland Titles: 1
Inter-county
Years	County	Apps (scores)
1979-1986	Tipperary	0 (0-00)
Inter-county titles
- Munster titles: 0
- All-Irelands: 0
- NHL: 0
- All Stars: 0

Denis O'Meara (born 1952) is an Irish former hurler. At club level he played with Kilruane MacDonaghs and was also a member of the Tipperary senior hurling team.

== Career ==
O'Meara first played Gaelic football and hurling at juvenile and underage levels with the Kilruane MacDonaghs club. He captained the club's under-21 team to their inaugural Tipperary U21AHC title in 1973 and later won a Tipperary SFC title in 1975. After winning three successive Tipperary SHC titles from 1977 to 1979, O'Meara secured a fourth winners' medal in 1985. He was at full-back on the Kilruane MacDonaghs team that won the All-Ireland Club Championship title in 1986.

At inter-county level, O'Meara was a member of the Tipperary under-21 hurling team in his final year of eligibility in 1973. He first played with the senior team during their successful 1978-79 National League campaign. O'Meara was also included on Tipperary's championship panels in 1979 and 1986. Sheppard was a non-playing substitute when Tipperary beat Cork in the 1987 Munster final replay.

== Honours ==
Kilruane MacDonaghs

- All-Ireland Senior Club Hurling Championship: 1986
- Munster Senior Club Hurling Championship: 1985
- Tipperary Senior Football Championship: 1975
- Tipperary Senior Hurling Championship: 1977, 1978, 1979, 1985
- Tipperary Under-21 A Hurling Championship: 1973 (c)

Tipperary

- National Hurling League: 1978-79
