= John Cahill (hurler) =

Irish hurler

Personal information
- Native name: Seán Ó Cathail (Irish)
- Nickname: JC
- Born: 1957 (age 68–69) Cloughjordan, County Tipperary, Ireland
- Occupation: Haulage contractor

Sport
- Sport: Hurling
- Position: Left corner-back
Club
- Years: Club
- Kilruane MacDonaghs
Club titles
- Tipperary titles: 4
- Munster titles: 1
- All-Ireland Titles: 1
Inter-county
Years	County	Apps (scores)
1985-1986	Tipperary	0 (0-00)
Inter-county titles
- Munster titles: 0
- All-Irelands: 0
- NHL: 0
- All Stars: 0

John Cahill (born 1957) is an Irish former hurler. At club level he played with Kilruane MacDonaghs and was also a member of the Tipperary senior hurling team.

== Career ==
Cahill first played hurling at juvenile and underage levels with the Kilruane MacDonaghs. After captaining the club's under-21 team to divisional honours in 1978, he also won a Tipperary IHC title the same year. After winning three Tipperary SHC titles as a substitute, Cahill secured a permanent place on the senior team for his fourth success in 1985. He was at right corner-back on the Kilruane MacDonaghs team that won the All-Ireland Club Championship title in 1986.

At inter-county level, Cahill never played at minor or under-21 levels but was included on the Tipperary junior hurling team in 1983. He was called up to the senior team for the 1986 Munster SHC campaign.

== Honours ==
Kilruane MacDonaghs

- All-Ireland Senior Club Hurling Championship: 1986
- Munster Senior Club Hurling Championship: 1985
- Tipperary Senior Hurling Championship: 1977, 1978, 1979, 1985
- North Tipperary Senior Hurling Championship: 1977, 1978, 1979, 1985, 1986, 1987, 1990
- Tipperary Intermediate Hurling Championship: 1978
