= Jim O'Meara (hurler) =

Irish hurler

Personal information
- Native name: Séamus Ó Meára (Irish)
- Nickname: The breeze
- Born: 1955 (age 70–71) Cloughjordan, County Tipperary, Ireland
- Occupation: Telecom employee

Sport
- Sport: Hurling
- Position: Centre-back
Club
- Years: Club
- 1973-1992: Kilruane MacDonaghs
Club titles
- Tipperary titles: 4
- Munster titles: 1
- All-Ireland Titles: 1
Inter-county
Years	County	Apps (scores)
1976-1977	Tipperary	0 (0-00)
Inter-county titles
- Munster titles: 0
- All-Irelands: 0
- NHL: 0
- All Stars: 0

James O'Meara (born 1955) is an Irish former hurler. At club level he played with Kilruane MacDonaghs and was also a member of the Tipperary senior hurling team.

== Career ==
O'Meara first played hurling at juvenile and underage levels with the Kilruane MacDonaghs. After winning four consecutive Tipperary U21AHC titles, he spent 20 seasons as a member of the club's senior team and is one of only a handful of players to have won seven North Tipperary SHC titles between 1977 and 1990 when he captained the team. O'Meara was at centre-back when Kilruane MacDonaghs won the All-Ireland Club Championship title in 1986, having earlier won four Tipperary SHC titles.

O'Meara first appeared on the inter-county scene during a two-year tenure with the Tipperary minor hurling team. He also spent two seasons with the under-21 team, however, his underage career ended without success. O'Meara's performances at club level earned his inclusion on the senior team for the 1977 Munster SHC campaign.

== Honours ==
Kilruane MacDonaghs

- All-Ireland Senior Club Hurling Championship: 1986
- Munster Senior Club Hurling Championship: 1985
- Tipperary Senior Hurling Championship: 1977, 1978, 1979, 1985 (c)
- North Tipperary Senior Hurling Championship: 1977, 1978, 1979, 1985, 1986, 1987, 1990 (c)
- Tipperary Under-21 A Hurling Championship: 1973, 1974, 1975, 1976
