= Gilbert Williams =

Irish hurler

Personal information
- Native name: Gilbeirt Mac Liam (Irish)
- Born: 1953 (age 72–73) Cloughjordan, County Tipperary, Ireland
- Occupation: Primary school principal

Sport
- Sport: Hurling
- Position: Left wing-back
Club
- Years: Club
- Kilruane MacDonaghs
Club titles
- Tipperary titles: 4
- Munster titles: 1
- All-Ireland Titles: 1
Inter-county
Years	County	Apps (scores)
1978-1979	Tipperary	0 (0-00)
Inter-county titles
- Munster titles: 0
- All-Irelands: 0
- NHL: 0
- All Stars: 0

Gilbert C. Williams (born 1953) is an Irish former hurler. At club level he played with Kilruane MacDonaghs and was also a member of the Tipperary senior hurling team.

== Career ==
Williams first played Gaelic football and hurling at juvenile and underage levels with the Kilruane MacDonaghs. He captained the club's minor team to the Tipperary MAHC title in 1971 before later winning consecutive Tipperary U21AHC titles. Williams was at left wing-back on the Kilruane MacDonaghs team that won the All-Ireland Club Championship title in 1986, having earlier won four Tipperary SHC titles and a Tipperary SFC title in 1975.

Williams first appeared on the inter-county scene as a member of the Tipperary minor hurling team in 1971. He later spent three seasons with the under-21 team, however, his underage career ended without success. Williams's performances at club level earned his inclusion on the senior team for the 1979 Munster SHC campaign.

== Honours ==
Kilruane MacDonaghs

- All-Ireland Senior Club Hurling Championship: 1986
- Munster Senior Club Hurling Championship: 1985
- Tipperary Senior Football Championship: 1975
- Tipperary Senior Hurling Championship: 1977, 1978, 1979, 1985
- Tipperary Under-21 A Hurling Championship: 1973, 1974
- Tipperary Minor A Hurling Championship: 1971 (c)
