= Tony Sheppard =

Irish hurler

Personal information
- Native name: Antóin Mac Aoire (Irish)
- Nickname: Skinny
- Born: 1956 (age 69–70) Cloughjordan, County Tipperary, Ireland
- Occupation: Insurance rep

Sport
- Sport: Hurling
- Position: Goalkeeper
Club
- Years: Club
- 1975-1990: Kilruane MacDonaghs
Club titles
- Tipperary titles: 4
- Munster titles: 1
- All-Ireland Titles: 1
Inter-county
Years	County	Apps (scores)
1978-1987	Tipperary	1 (0-00)
Inter-county titles
- Munster titles: 1
- All-Irelands: 0
- NHL: 1
- All Stars: 0

Anthony Sheppard (born 1956) is an Irish former hurler. At club level he played with Kilruane MacDonaghs and was also a member of the Tipperary senior hurling team.

== Career ==
Sheppard first played Gaelic football and hurling at juvenile and underage levels with the Kilruane MacDonaghs. After winning numerous divisional titles in the minor and under-21 grades, he progressed onto the club's respective senior teams and won a combined total of 12 North Tipperary titles across both codes between 1976 and 1990. He captained Kilruane MacDonaghs to the All-Ireland Club Championship title in 1986, having earlier won four Tipperary SHC titles.

Sheppard first lined out at inter-county level as a forward on the Tipperary minor hurling team during the 1974 Munster MHC campaign. He later spent two seasons with the under-21 team. Sheppard first played with the senior team during their successful 1978-79 National League campaign. He made his only championship appearance when he captained the team in 1986. Sheppard was a non-playing substitute when Tipperary beat Cork in the 1987 Munster final replay.

== Honours ==
Kilruane MacDonaghs

- All-Ireland Senior Club Hurling Championship: 1986 (c)
- Munster Senior Club Hurling Championship: 1985 (c)
- Tipperary Senior Hurling Championship: 1977, 1978, 1979, 1985 (c)
- North Tipperary Senior Hurling Championship: 1977, 1978, 1979, 1985 (c), 1986 (c), 1987, 1990
- North Tipperary Senior Football Championship: 1976, 1977, 1978, 1979, 1981

Tipperary

- Munster Senior Hurling Championship: 1987
- National Hurling League: 1978-79

Sporting positions
Preceded by Jack Bergin	Tipperary senior hurling team captain 1986	Succeeded by Richard Stakelum
Achievements
Preceded by Johnny Brennan	All-Ireland Senior Club Hurling Final winning captain 1986	Succeeded by Mick Ryan
