= Len Gaynor =

Irish hurler

Personal information
- Native name: Lionard Mag Fhionnbhairr (Irish)
- Born: 1944 (age 81–82) Kilruane, County Tipperary, Ireland
- Occupation: Farmer
- Height: 5 ft 9 in (175 cm)

Sport
- Sport: Hurling
- Position: Left wing-back
Club
- Years: Club
- 1962–1989: Kilruane MacDonagh's
Club titles
- Tipperary titles: 3
Inter-county
- Years: County
- 1964–1974: Tipperary
Inter-county titles
- Munster titles: 5
- All-Irelands: 3
- NHL: 2
- All Stars: 0

Leonard James Gaynor (born 1944) is an Irish former hurler who played as a left wing-back at senior level for the Tipperary county team.

== Early life ==
Born and raised in Kilruane, County Tipperary, Len first played as a schoolboy in various juvenile competitions at Kilruane National School before later lining out as a student at St Flannan's College in Ennis. He lined out in the Harty Cup but success eluded him in that competition. Gaynor captained St Flannan's to the Dean Ryan Cup title in 1961 after a 6–07 to 1–03 defeat of De La Salle College Waterford in the final.

== Club career ==
Gaynor played his first juvenile game for the Kilruane MacDonaghs club as an 11-year-old in 1955. He enjoyed his first major success in 1959 when he captained Kilruane to the Tipperary U15HC title after a defeat of a Babs Keating-inspired Ballybacon-Grange in the final. Gaynor made his first appearance for the Kilruane MacDonaghs senior team in a tournament game against Thurles Sarsfields on Easter Sunday 1962.

Gaynor claimed his first senior silverware in 1965 when Kilruane beat Lorrha to win the North Tipperary SHC, however, success at county level had eluded the club. By 1977 he had contemplated retirement from the club's senior team, however, he remained on as player-coach. It was a successful decision as Kilruane won three successive Tipperary SHC titles from 1977 to 1979 after defeats of Borris-Ileigh, Roscrea and Thurles Sarsfields.

After stepping away from the Kilruane MacDonaghs senior team, Gaynor continued to line out with the club's junior team. He won a Tipperary JAHC title in 1985 after a 17-point defeat of Cappawhite in the final. Gaynor brought his 34-year playing career to an end when he lined out in goal in a North Tipperary JBHC game against Moneygall in 1989.

== Inter-county ==
Performances at colleges and club level earned Gaynor a call-up to the Tipperary minor hurling team in 1962. He won a Munster MHC title that year after lining out at centre-forward in the 10-point defeat of Cork, however, Tipperary were beaten by Kilkenny in the 1962 All-Ireland minor final. After a year out of inter-county activity, Gaynor was selected for the inaugural Tipperary under-21 hurling team in 1964. Tipperary dominated that year's championship, winning all of their matches by an average of 23 points. Gaynor added a Munstr U21HC to his provincial collection after a defeat of Cork before lining out at left wing-back in the 1964 All-Ireland under-21 final defeat of Wexford. He claimed a second successive provincial winners' medal the following year, however, Wexford reversed the previous year's result by beating Tipperary by 3–07 to 1–04 in the 1964 All-Ireland under-21 final.

By that stage Gaynor had already joined the senior team. He was an unused substitute throughout the 1964 campaign and, after collecting a Munster SHC medal, ended the season by being listed as one of the substitutes for the 1964 All-Ireland final defeat of Kilkenny. Gaynor later made his debut in the Oireachtas Tournament.

Gaynor was a regular member of the starting fifteen throughout the 1964-65 league and championship campaigns. He won a second successive Munster SHC medal – his first on the field of play – after an 18-point win over Cork in the Munster final. Gaynor collected a second successive All-Ireland winners' medal following the 2–16 to 0–10 defeat of Wexford in the 1965 All-Ireland final. He ended the season by claiming a first National League title after a defeat of New York.

After an unsuccessful season in 1966, Gaynor won a third Munster winners' medal after a defeat of Clare in the 1967 Munster final. He was named in his customary left wing-back position for the 3–08 to 2–07 defeat by Kilkenny in the 1967 All-Ireland final. In spite of this defeat, Gaynor was named Tipperary Hurler of the Year and was also selected on the Gaelic Weekly Team of the Year.

Gaynor won a second National League title after a defeat of New York at the end of the 1967–68 league season. He later won a fourth Munster title in five years after a 2–13 to 1–07 win over Cork in the 1968 Munster final. The 1968 All-Ireland final was the fourth Tipperary-Wexford final of the decade and, in spite of his side holding an eight-point half-time lead, Gaynor ended up on the losing side for the second successive year.

After two seasons without success, Gaynor won his fifth and final provincial winners' medal in 1971 after a one-point defeat of Limerick in the final. The subsequent All-Ireland final saw Tipperary win with a goal to spare over Kilkenny, with Gaynor quoted in the Irish Press as saying: "It was the best match in which I have played and I am tremendously proud to win my third All-Ireland medal."

== Managerial career ==
Len Gaynor
Sport
Inter-county management
- Years: Team
- 1990–1994 1996–1998: Clare; Tipperary

In the early 1990s Gaynor served as manager of the Clare senior hurling team. He had some success by steering the county to two consecutive Munster final appearances in 1993 and 1994, however, these games ended in huge defeats for Clare. He was replaced in 1995 by Ger Loughnane. In 1997 Gaynor became manager of the Tipperary senior hurling team. Once again his tenure in charge was mixed, as Tipp were defeated in both the Munster and All-Ireland finals by Clare in the first year of the "back door system"

== Honours ==
=== Player ===
St Flannan's College

- Dean Ryan Cup: 1961 (c)

Kilruane MacDonaghs

- Tipperary Senior Hurling Championship: 1977, 1978, 1979
- North Tipperary Senior Hurling Championship: 1965, 1977, 1978, 1979
- Tipperary Junior A Hurling Championship: 1985
- North Tipperary Junior A Hurling Championship: 1985

Tipperary

- All-Ireland Senior Hurling Championship: 1964, 1965, 1971
- Munster Senior Hurling Championship: 1964, 1965, 1967, 1968, 1971
- National Hurling League: 1964–65, 1967–68
- All-Ireland Under-21 Hurling Championship: 1964
- Munster Under-21 Hurling Championship: 1964, 1965
- Munster Minor Hurling Championship: 1962

Munster

- Railway Cup: 1968, 1969, 1970

=== Management ===
Kilruane MacDonaghs

- All-Ireland Senior Club Hurling Championship: 1986
- Munster Senior Club Hurling Championship: 1985
- Tipperary Senior Hurling Championship: 1977, 1978, 1979, 1985
- North Tipperary Senior Hurling Championship: 1977, 1978, 1979, 1985, 1986, 1987
- Tipperary Under-21 A Hurling Championship: 1973, 1974, 1975, 1976
- North Tipperary Under-21 A Hurling Championship: 1972, 1973, 1974, 1975, 1976, 1978
- Tipperary Minor A Hurling Championship: 1972
- North Tipperary Minor A Hurling Championship: 1971, 1972

Moycarkey-Borris

- Tipperary Senior Hurling Championship: 1982
- Mid Tipperary Senior Hurling Championship: 1982

Shannon Rovers

- Tipperary Intermediate Hurling Championship: 1986
- North Tipperary Intermediate Hurling Championship: 1985, 1986

Newport

- Tipperary Intermediate Hurling Championship: 1989
- North Tipperary Intermediate Hurling Championship: 1989

Clonoulty-Rossmore

- Tipperary Senior Hurling Championship: 1989
- West Tipperary Senior Hurling Championship: 1989

Tipperary

- Ford Cup: 1985
- Munster Under-21 Hurling Championship: 2006

Sporting positions
| Preceded by Séamus Durack | Clare Senior Hurling Manager; 1990–1994 | Succeeded by Ger Loughnane |
| Preceded by Tom Fogarty | Tipperary Senior Hurling Manager; 1996–1998 | Succeeded by Nicky English |
| Preceded by Éamonn Kelly | Tipperary Intermediate Hurling Manager; 2004–2006 | Succeeded by Connie Maher |
| Preceded by Michael Ryan | Munster Hurling Manager; 2008–2009 | Succeeded by Liam Sheedy |
