= Mick Minogue =

Irish hurler (1936–2024)

Personal information
- Native name: Micheál Ó Muineog (Irish)
- Born: 1936 Knockshigowna, County Tipperary, Ireland
- Died: 13 December 2024 (aged 88) Roscrea, County Tipperary, Ireland

Sport
- Sport: Hurling
- Position: Midfield
Club
- Years: Club
- Roscrea
Club titles
- Offaly titles: 5
- Leinster titles: 1
- All-Ireland Titles: 1
Inter-county
- Years: County
- 1958-1961: Tipperary
Inter-county titles
- Leinster titles: 0
- All-Irelands: 0
- NHL: 0
- All Stars: 0

Michael C. Minogue (1936 – 13 December 2024) was an Irish hurling coach and player. At club level he played with Roscrea and at inter-county level he played with the Tipperary senior hurling team. Minogue also served as a manager, coach and selector with various club and inter-county teams.

== Playing career ==
Minogue played his club hurling with Roscrea at a time when the club had a number of successes. He won five Tipperary SHC medals in a six-years period between 1968 and 1973. Minogue was at midfield when Roscrea won the Munster Club SHC title in 1970, before winning an All-Ireland Club SHC medal in 1971 following Roscrea's 4–05 to 2–05 defeat of St Rynagh's in the final. At inter-county level, he made a number of appearances for the Tipperary senior hurling team in the National Hurling League between 1958 and 1961.

== Management career ==
Minogue began his coaching career at club level with Moneygall and guided them to their first ever Tipperary SHC title in 1975. At inter-county level, he coached Tipperary's minor team to the All-Ireland MHC title in 1976. This began a 15-year association with Tipperary at all levels. At senior level, Minogue was part of the selection panel on a number of occasions, including for Tipperary's National Hurling League success in 1979. He was also part of five All-Ireland U21HC-winning management teams between 1979 and 1989.

== Death ==
Minogue died on 13 December 2024, at the age of 88.

== Honours ==
=== Player ===
Roscrea

- All-Ireland Senior Club Hurling Championship: 1971
- Munster Senior Club Hurling Championship: 1970
- Tipperary Senior Hurling Championship: 1968, 1969, 1970, 1972, 1973
- North Tipperary Senior Hurling Championship: 1963, 1967, 1968, 1969, 1970, 1971

=== Management ===
Moneygall

- Tipperary Senior Hurling Championship: 1975

Tipperary

- National Hurling League: 1978–79
- All-Ireland Under-21 Hurling Championship: 1979, 1980, 1981, 1985, 1989
- Munster Under-21 Hurling Championship: 1979, 1980, 1981, 1984, 1985, 1989, 1990
- All-Ireland Minor Hurling Championship: 1976
- Munster Minor Hurling Championship: 1976
