= Michael Murphy =

Michael, Mick, or Mike Murphy may refer to:

== Artists and entertainers ==
- Michael Murphy (actor) (born 1938), American actor
- Michael Murphy (Canadian actor) (born 1996), Canadian actor best known for the role of "Sam Foster" in the sitcom Life with Boys
- Mike Murphy (musician) (1946–2006), American drummer for the Bee Gees and Chicago
- Michael Bryan Murphy, lead singer of REO Speedwagon
- Michael John Murphy, American folk musician
- Mike L. Murphy (born 1975), American film maker and animator
- Michael Murphy (singer) (born 1986), New Zealand Idol runner up
- Mic Murphy (born 1958), member of musical duo The System
- Michael Murphy (sculptor) (born 1975), American artist
- Mick Murphy (guitarist) (born 1972), American guitarist and multi-instrumentalist

== Sportspeople ==
=== Association football ===
- Mick Murphy (footballer) (born 1976), English former football midfielder
- Mike Murphy (footballer) (born 1939), English former football goalkeeper

=== Gaelic football ===
- Michael Murphy (Gaelic footballer) (born 1989), Donegal and Glenswilly sportsman
- Mick Murphy (Gaelic footballer) (1931–2009), Irish Gaelic footballer

=== Gridiron football ===
- Mike Murphy (American football) (born 1944), American football coach
- Mike Murphy (Canadian football) (born 1954), Canadian Football League fullback
- Mike Murphy (trainer and coach) (1860–1913), trainer of boxing champion John L. Sullivan, first Michigan Wolverines football coach, and the "father of American track athletics"

=== Hurling ===
- Mick Murphy (Limerick hurler) (1897–1955), Irish hurler who played as a goalkeeper for the Limerick senior team
- Michael Murphy (Templederry hurler) (born 1959), Irish hurler
- Mick Murphy (Tipperary hurler) (1940–2018), Irish sportsperson
- Mick Murphy (hurler, born 1918) (1918–2018), Irish hurler with Tipperary and Clare
- Mick Murphy (Cork hurler) (1894–1968), Irish sportsman and revolutionary figure

=== Other sports ===
- Michael Murphy (Australian footballer) (born 1965), VFL/AFL player
- Mick Murphy (rugby league) (1941–2019), rugby union and rugby league footballer of the 1960s and 1970s
- Mike Murphy (baseball) (1888–1952), American Major League Baseball catcher
- Michael Murphy (cricketer) (1854–1890), Australian cricketer
- Mick Murphy (cyclist) (1934–2015), Irish cyclist, wrestler and boxer
- Michael Murphy (diver) (born 1973), Australian Olympic diver
- Mike Murphy (ice hockey, born 1950), ice hockey player and head coach, currently NHL vice-president of hockey operations
- Mike Murphy (ice hockey, born 1989), Canadian ice hockey goaltender
- Mike Murphy (trainer and coach) (1860–1913), trainer of boxing champion John L. Sullivan, first Michigan Wolverines football coach, and the "father of American track athletics"
- Mick Murphy (speedway rider) (1911 – 1998), Australian speedway rider

== Politicians ==
- Michael Murphy (New Hampshire politician), member of the New Hampshire House of Representatives
- Michael Murphy (Indiana politician) (born 1957), member of the Indiana House of Representatives
- Michael Pat Murphy (1919–2000), Irish Labour Party politician
- Michael Murphy (Tennessee politician), member of the Tennessee House of Representatives (1971–1986)
- Michael C. Murphy (New York politician) (1839–1903), New York politician and Medal of Honor recipient
- Michael C. Murphy (Michigan politician) (1952–2014), member of the Michigan House of Representatives
- Mick Murphy (Irish Socialist politician), Irish Socialist Party political activist
- Mick Murphy (Sinn Féin politician) (born 1942), nationalist politician in Northern Ireland
- Mike Murphy (Illinois politician), Illinois politician
- Mike Murphy (New Brunswick politician) (born 1958), Canadian lawyer and Liberal politician
- Mike Murphy (political consultant) (born 1962), American Republican political consultant
- Mike Murphy (Washington politician), treasurer of the state of Washington
- Michael Murphy (Kansas politician), member of the Kansas House of Representatives
- Michael A. Murphy (1837–1909), associate justice of the Supreme Court of Nevada
- Michael Murphy (Fine Gael politician), Irish Fine Gael politician

== Soldiers ==
- Michael Murphy (VC) (c. 1837–1893), Irish recipient of the Victoria Cross
- Michael D. Murphy, U.S. Air Force colonel charged with falsely claiming to be an attorney
- Michael P. Murphy (1976–2005), U.S. Navy SEAL and Medal of Honor recipient, killed in the War in Afghanistan

== Characters ==
- Michael Murphy, fictional character in the TV series The Leftovers
- Michael Murphy, main protagonist of Babylon Rising

== Others ==
- Michael Murphy (author) (born 1930), American Integral Movement author and co-founder of the Esalen Institute
- Michael Murphy (priest) (c. 1767–1798), co-leader of the Irish Rebellion of 1798
- Michael Murphy (bishop), 20th-century Irish Roman Catholic bishop
- Michael Derrington Murphy (born 1940), chemistry professor and bluegrass musician
- Michael J. Murphy (police commissioner) (1913–1997), American police commissioner
- Michael Joseph Murphy (1915–2007), American prelate of the Roman Catholic Church
- Michael R. Murphy (born 1947), American judge
- Michael Murphy (academic), former President of University College Cork
- Michael Murphy (New Zealand magistrate) (1806–1852), New Zealander clerk, police magistrate, and subsheriff
- Michael Murphy (journalist) (born 1948/49), news reader with RTÉ
- Mike Murphy (presenter) (born 1941), Irish broadcaster
- Mike Murphy (sports radio personality) (born 1951), nicknamed "Murph", American radio talk-show host
- Michael J. Murphy (builder) (1885–1959), master builder in the Carmel-by-the-Sea, California
- Michael J. Murphy (diplomat), American diplomat
- USS Michael Murphy, a United States Navy destroyer

== See also ==
- Michael Martin Murphey (born 1945), American singer and songwriter
