= Pat Looby =

Irish hurler

Personal information
- Born: 1958 (age 67–68) Bouladuff, County Tipperary, Ireland

Sport
- Sport: Hurling
- Position: Left corner-forward
Club
- Years: Club
- Drom & Inch
Club titles
- Tipperary titles: 0
Inter-county
Years	County	Apps (scores)
1979-1980	Tipperary	0 (0-00)
Inter-county titles
- Munster titles: 0
- All-Irelands: 0
- NHL: 1
- All Stars: 0

Patrick Looby (born 1958) is an Irish former hurler. At club level he played with Drom & Inch and was also a member of the Tipperary senior hurling team. He usually lined out as a forward.

== Career ==
Looby first played hurling at juvenile and underage levels with the Drom & Inch club. He eventually joined the club's senior team and won a Mid Tipperary Championship title in 1984. Looby first appeared on the inter-county scene with the Tipperary minor team that won the All-Ireland Minor Championship in 1976. He progressed onto the Tipperary under-21 team and an All-Ireland Under-21 Championship title in 1979. Looby subsequently made a number of league and championship appearances with the Tipperary senior hurling team between 1979 and 1980.

== Honours ==
Drom & Inch

- Mid Tipperary Senior Hurling Championship: 1984

Tipperary

- National Hurling League: 1978-79
- All-Ireland Under-21 Hurling Championship: 1979
- Munster Under-21 Hurling Championship: 1979
- All-Ireland Minor Hurling Championship: 1976
- Munster Minor Hurling Championship: 1976
