= Tom Moloughney =

Irish hurler (1940–2021)

Personal information
- Native name: Tomás Ó Maolfhachtna (Irish)
- Born: 23 October 1940 Ardcroney, County Tipperary, Ireland
- Died: 6 March 2021 (aged 80) Ardcroney, County Tipperary, Ireland
- Height: 5 ft 10 in (178 cm)

Sport
- Sport: Hurling
- Position: Full-forward
Club
- Years: Club
- Kilruane MacDonagh's
Club titles
- Tipperary titles: 0
Inter-county*
Years	County	Apps (scores)
1959–1963	Tipperary	11 (7-07)
Inter-county titles
- Munster titles: 3
- All-Irelands: 2
- NHL: 2
- *Inter County team apps and scores correct as of 22:20, 6 March 2021.

Thomas Moloughney (23 October 1940 – 6 March 2021) was an Irish hurler who played at club level with Kilruane MacDonagh's and at inter-county level with Tipperary.

== Career ==
Born in Ardcroney, Moloughney was a member of the Kilruane MacDonagh's club. Having never played minor at inter-county level, he first played for Tipperary in a National League game against Galway in October 1959 after impressive club displays. After claiming the league title, McLoughney's debut season ended with him collecting the first of three successive Munster Championship medals. After losing the 1960 All-Ireland final to Wexford, Tipperary went on to claim the following two titles, with Moloughney lining out in the full-forward line in both those victories. His last appearance came as a substitute in the 1963 National League final.

Having never won a County Championship title during his own playing days, Moloughney served as a selector when Kilruane MacDonagh's won three successive titles between 1977 and 1979. He also served as a selector with the Tipperary senior team for a number of seasons.

== Honours ==
=== Player ===
Kilruane MacDonaghs

- North Tipperary Senior Hurling Championship: 1959, 1965

Tipperary

- All-Ireland Senior Hurling Championship: 1961, 1962
- Munster Senior Hurling Championship: 1960, 1961, 1962
- National Hurling League: 1959–60, 1960–61

=== Selector ===
Kilruane MacDonaghs

- Tipperary Senior Hurling Championship: 1977, 1978, 1979
