= Joe Banaghan =

Irish hurler

Joe Banahan
Personal information
- Native name: Seosamh Ó Beannacháin (Irish)
- Born: 1961 (age 64–65) Cloughjordan, County Tipperary, Ireland
- Occupation: Stores assistant

Sport
- Sport: Hurling
- Position: Right wing-back
Club
- Years: Club
- Kilruane MacDonaghs
Club titles
- Tipperary titles: 1
- Munster titles: 1
- All-Ireland Titles: 1
Inter-county
Years	County	Apps (scores)
1985-1986	Tipperary	0 (0-00)
Inter-county titles
- Munster titles: 0
- All-Irelands: 0
- NHL: 0
- All Stars: 0

Joseph Banaghan (born 1961) is an Irish former hurler. At club level he played with Kilruane MacDonaghs and was also a member of the Tipperary senior hurling team.

== Career ==
Banaghan first played hurling at juvenile and underage levels with the Kilruane MacDonaghs club. He eventually progressed onto the club's senior team and was at right wing-back on the Kilruane MacDonaghs team that won the All-Ireland Club Championship title in 1986.

At inter-county level, Banaghan never played at minor or under-21 levels. His performances at club level earned a call-up to the Tipperary senior hurling team for the 1986 Munster SHC campaign.

== Honours ==
Kilruane MacDonaghs

- All-Ireland Senior Club Hurling Championship: 1986
- Munster Senior Club Hurling Championship: 1985
- Tipperary Senior Hurling Championship: 1985
