= Séamus Hennessy =

Séamus Hennessy may refer to:

- Séamus Hennessy (hurler, born 1989), Irish hurler for Tipperary and Kilruane MacDonagh's
- Séamus Hennessy (hurler, born 1956), his father, Irish hurler for Tipperary and Kilruane MacDonagh's
