= Séamus Hennessy (hurler, born 1956) =

Irish hurler

Personal information
- Native name: Séamus Ó hAonasa (Irish)
- Born: 1956 (age 69–70) Cloughjordan, County Tipperary, Ireland
- Occupation: Farmer

Sport
- Sport: Hurling
- Position: Midfield
Club
Years	Club	Apps (scores)
	Kilruane MacDonaghs	31 (5-118)
Club titles
- Tipperary titles: 4
- Munster titles: 1
- All-Ireland Titles: 1
Inter-county
Years	County	Apps (scores)
1978-1979	Tipperary	0 (0-00)
Inter-county titles
- Munster titles: 0
- All-Irelands: 0
- NHL: 0
- All Stars: 0

Séamus Hennessy (born 1956) is an Irish former hurler. At club level he played with Kilruane MacDonaghs and was also a member of the Tipperary senior hurling team.

== Career ==
Hennessy first played hurling at juvenile and underage levels with the Kilruane MacDonaghs. He is the only player to have lined out in six consecutive divisional under-21 finals and is one of only a handful of players to have won four consecutive Tipperary U21AHC titles with the club from 1973 to 1976. Hennessy was the youngest ever Kilruane player to line out in a North Tipperary SHC final when he did so as a 17-year-old in 1973. He came on as a substitute for Enda Hogan at midfield when Kilruane MacDonaghs won the All-Ireland Club Championship title in 1986

Hennessy first appeared on the inter-county scene during a two-year tenure with the Tipperary minor hurling team. He also spent two seasons with the under-21 team. Hennessy's performances at club level earned his inclusion on the senior team for the 1979 Munster SHC campaign.

== Personal life ==
His son, also called Séamus Hennessy, was part of the Tipperary team that won the All-Ireland SHC title in 2010.

== Honours ==
Kilruane MacDonaghs

- All-Ireland Senior Club Hurling Championship: 1986
- Munster Senior Club Hurling Championship: 1985
- Tipperary Senior Hurling Championship: 1977, 1978, 1979, 1985
- North Tipperary Senior Hurling Championship: 1977, 1978, 1979, 1985, 1986, 1987
- Tipperary Under-21 A Hurling Championship: 1973, 1974, 1975, 1976
