= Michael Murphy (Templederry hurler) =

Irish hurler

Personal information
- Born: 1959 (age 66–67) Templderry, County Tipperary, Ireland
- Occupation: Farmer

Sport
- Sport: Hurling
- Position: Right corner-forward
Club
- Years: Club
- Templederry Kenyons
Club titles
- Tipperary titles: 0
Inter-county*
Years	County	Apps (scores)
1979-1980	Tipperary	1 (0-00)
Inter-county titles
- Munster titles: 0
- All-Irelands: 0
- NHL: 1
- All Stars: 0
- *Inter County team apps and scores correct as of 23:04, 27 August 2021.

Michael Murphy (born 1959) is an Irish former hurler. At club level he played with Templederry Kenyons and was also a member of the Tipperary senior hurling team. He usually lined out as a forward.

== Career ==
Murphy first played juvenile and underage hurling with the Templederry Kenyons club before joining the club's top adult team. He had some divisional success, winning a North Tipperary Intermediate Championship title. Murphy first appeared on the inter-county scene with the Tipperary minor team that won the All-Ireland Minor Championship in 1976. He progressed onto the Tipperary under-21 team and won back-to-back All-Ireland Under-21 Championship titles from three consecutive finals appearances between 1978 and 1980. Murphy subsequently made a number of league and championship appearances with the Tipperary senior hurling team and was part of the National Hurling League-winning side in 1979.

== Honours ==
Killenaule

- North Tipperary Intermediate Hurling Championship: 1979

Tipperary

- National Hurling League: 1978-79
- All-Ireland Under-21 Hurling Championship: 1979, 1980
- Munster Under-21 Hurling Championship: 1978, 1979, 1980
- All-Ireland Minor Hurling Championship: 1976
- Munster Minor Hurling Championship: 1976
