= Séamus Gibson =

Irish hurler

Personal information
- Native name: Séamus Mac Gib (Irish)
- Nickname: Sharkey
- Born: 26 December 1962 (age 63) Cloughjordan, County Tipperary, Ireland
- Occupation: Creamery employee
- Height: 5 ft 10 in (178 cm)

Sport
- Sport: Hurling
- Position: Left corner-back
Club
- Years: Club
- Kilruane MacDonaghs
Club titles
- Tipperary titles: 1
- Munster titles: 1
- All-Ireland Titles: 1
Inter-county
Years	County	Apps (scores)
1986-1988	Tipperary	8 (0-00)
Inter-county titles
- Munster titles: 2
- All-Irelands: 0
- NHL: 1
- All Stars: 0

Séamus Gibson (born 26 December 1962) is an Irish former hurler. At club level he played with Kilruane MacDonaghs and was also a member of the Tipperary senior hurling team.

== Career ==
Gibson first played hurling at juvenile and underage levels with the Kilruane MacDonaghs club. He eventually progressed onto the club's senior team and was at left corner-back on the Kilruane MacDonaghs team that won the All-Ireland Club Championship title in 1986.

At inter-county level, Gibson never played at minor or under-21 levels, however, his performances at club level earned a call-up to the Tipperary senior hurling team in 1986. He claimed his first inter-county silverware after giving a man of the match display in the 1987 Munster final replay defeat of Cork. Gibson added a National Hurling League title to collection in 1988 before winning a second successive Munster SHC medal. He was an unused substitute when Tipperary were beaten by Galway in the 1988 All-Ireland final.

== Honours ==
Kilruane MacDonaghs

- All-Ireland Senior Club Hurling Championship: 1986
- Munster Senior Club Hurling Championship: 1985
- Tipperary Senior Hurling Championship: 1985

Tipperary

- Munster Senior Hurling Championship: 1987, 1988
- National Hurling League: 1987-88
