= Joe O'Dwyer (hurler, born 1959) =

Irish hurler

Personal information
- Born: 1959 (age 66–67) Killenaule, County Tipperary, Ireland

Sport
- Sport: Hurling
- Position: Centre-back
Club
- Years: Club
- Killenaule
Club titles
- Tipperary titles: 0
Inter-county*
Years	County	Apps (scores)
1981-1985	Tipperary	2 (0-00)
Inter-county titles
- Munster titles: 0
- All-Irelands: 0
- NHL: 0
- All Stars: 0
- *Inter County team apps and scores correct as of 23:04, 27 August 2021.

Joseph O'Dwyer (born 1959) is an Irish former hurler. At club level he played with Killenaule and was also a member of the Tipperary senior hurling team. His regular position was centre-back.

== Career ==
O'Dwyer first played junior hurling with the Killenaule club before joining the club's senior team. He had success in different divisions, winning consecutive South Tipperary Championship titles. O'Dwyer first appeared on the inter-county scene with the Tipperary minor team that won the All-Ireland Minor Championship in 1976. He progressed to the Tipperary under-21 team and won back-to-back All-Ireland Under-21 Championship titles. He appeared in three consecutive finals between 1978 and 1980. O'Dwyer subsequently made a number of league and championship appearances with the Tipperary senior hurling team before lining out with the junior team.

== Honours ==
Killenaule

- South Tipperary Senior Hurling Championship: 1988, 1989

Tipperary

- Munster Junior Hurling Championship: 1985
- All-Ireland Under-21 Hurling Championship: 1979, 1980
- Munster Under-21 Hurling Championship: 1978, 1979, 1980
- All-Ireland Minor Hurling Championship: 1976
- Munster Minor Hurling Championship: 1976
