= Vincent Mullins =

Irish hurler

Personal information
- Nickname: Vinnie
- Born: 1959 (age 66–67) Clonmel, County Tipperary, Ireland

Sport
- Sport: Hurling
- Position: Goalkeeper
Club
- Years: Club
- St. Mary's Clonmel
Club titles
- Tipperary titles: 0
Inter-county*
Years	County	Apps (scores)
1980-1981	Tipperary	0 (0-00)
Inter-county titles
- Munster titles: 0
- All-Irelands: 0
- NHL: 0
- All Stars: 0
- *Inter County team apps and scores correct as of 14:15, 27 August 2021.

Vincent Mullins (born 1959) is an Irish former hurler. At club level he played with St. Mary's Clonmel and was also a member of the Tipperary senior hurling team. He usually lined out as a goalkeeper.

== Career ==
Mullins played juvenile and underage hurling with the St. Mary's club in Clonmel. He was just 16-years-old when he lined out with the St. Mary's team that won the County Junior Championship title in 1975, before later winning a South Tipperary Senior Championship title in 1981. Mullins's performances for the club brought him to the attention of the Tipperary minor team selectors and he lined out in goal for their All-Ireland Minor Championship success in 1976. He progressed onto the Tipperary under-21 team and won consecutive All-Ireland Under-21 Championship titles from 1979 and 1980. Mullins lined out as sub-goalkeeper with the Tipperary senior hurling team for one season.

== Honours ==
St. Mary's Clonmel

- South Tipperary Senior Hurling Championship: 1981
- Tipperary Junior A Hurling Championship: 1975

Tipperary

- All-Ireland Under-21 Hurling Championship: 1979, 1980
- Munster Under-21 Hurling Championship: 1978, 1979, 1980
- All-Ireland Minor Hurling Championship: 1976
- Munster Minor Hurling Championship: 1976
