= John Stone (hurler) =

Irish hurler

Personal information
- Native name: Seán Ó Maolchluiche (Irish)
- Born: 1958 (age 67–68) Roscrea; County Tipperary , Ireland
- Occupation: ESB employee

Sport
- Sport: Hurling
- Position: Full-forward
Club
- Years: Club
- Roscrea
Club titles
- Tipperary titles: 1
Inter-county
Years	County	Apps (scores)
1980-1981	Tipperary	0 (0-00)
Inter-county titles
- Munster titles: 0
- All-Irelands: 0
- NHL: 0
- All Stars: 0

John Stone (born 1958) is an Irish former hurler. At club level he played with Roscrea and was also a member of the Tipperary senior hurling team.

== Career ==
Stone first played hurling at juvenile and underage levels with the Roscrea club. He was part of the club's minor team that won three consecutive North Tipperary MHC titles from 1974 to 1976. Stone progressed onto the senior team and was at left wing-forward when Roscrea beat Kilruane MacDonaghs in the 1980 final.

Stone first appeared on the inter-county scene as a member of the Tipperary minor hurling team. He was at full-forward when Tipperary beat Kilkenny by 16 points in the 1976 All-Ireland minor final. Stone later won consecutive All-Ireland U21HC titles with the Tipperary under-21 team in 1978 and 1979. He joined the senior team for the 1980-81 season.

== Honours ==
Roscrea

- Tipperary Senior Hurling Championship: 1980
- North Tipperary Senior Hurling Championship: 1980, 1982

Tipperary

- All-Ireland Under-21 Hurling Championship: 1978, 1979
- Munster Under-21 Hurling Championship: 1978, 1979
- All-Ireland Minor Hurling Championship: 1976
- Munster Minor Hurling Championship: 1976
