= Jim Williams (hurler) =

Irish hurler

Personal information
- Native name: Séamus Mac Liam (Irish)
- Born: 1952 (age 73–74) Cloughjordan, County Tipperary, Ireland
- Occupation: Council employee

Sport
- Sport: Hurling
- Position: Centre-forward
Club
- Years: Club
- 1969-1995: Kilruane MacDonaghs
Club titles
- Tipperary titles: 4
- Munster titles: 1
- All-Ireland Titles: 1
Inter-county
- Years: County
- 1971-1976 1975-1986: Tipperary (SF); Tipperary (SH)
Inter-county titles
- Munster titles: 0
- All-Irelands: 0
- NHL: 1
- All Stars: 0

James Williams (born 1952) is an Irish former hurler and Gaelic footballer. At club level he played with Kilruane MacDonaghs and was also a member of the Tipperary senior teams as a dual player.

== Career ==
Williams first played hurling and Gaelic football at juvenile and underage levels with the Kilruane MacDonaghs club. He won a number of divisional minor and under-21 titles in both codes and was also a member of the team that won the first of four consecutive Tipperary Under-21AHC titles in 1973. Williams made his first appearance for the club's senior team as a 16-year-old in 1969. He was at centre-forward on the Kilruane MacDonaghs team that won the All-Ireland Club Championship title in 1986, having earlier won four Tipperary SHC titles, including one as team captain, and a Tipperary SFC title in 1975. His 26-year club career came to an end in 1995.

Williams first appeared on the inter-county scene as a member of the Tipperary minor football team in 1970. He later spent three seasons with the under-21 team, however, his underage career ended without silverware. Williams was just out of the minor grade when he was selected for the senior team in 1971. He became dual inter-county player in 1975 when he joined the Tipperary senior hurling team. Williams was part of the Tipperary team that won the 1978-79 National League.

== Honours ==
Kilruane MacDonaghs

- All-Ireland Senior Club Hurling Championship: 1986
- Munster Senior Club Hurling Championship: 1985
- Tipperary Senior Football Championship: 1975
- Tipperary Senior Hurling Championship: 1977, 1978, 1979, 1985
- Tipperary Under-21 A Hurling Championship: 1973

Tipperary

- National Hurling League: 1978-79
