= Brian Gaynor =

Irish hurler

Personal information
- Native name: Brian Mag Fhionnbhairr (Irish)
- Nickname: Beanie
- Born: 4th of April 1973 Kilruane, County Tipperary, Ireland
- Occupation: Farmer

Sport
- Sport: Hurling
- Position: Right wing-back
Club
- Years: Club
- Kilruane MacDonagh's
Club titles
- Tipperary titles: 0
- Munster titles: 0
- All-Ireland Titles: 0
Inter-county
Years	County	Apps (scores)
1994–1997	Tipperary	0 (0-00)
Inter-county titles
- Munster titles: 0
- All-Irelands: 0
- NHL: 0
- All Stars: 0

Brian Gaynor (born 1973) is an Irish retired hurler who played as a right wing-back for the Tipperary senior team.

Gaynor joined the team during the 1995–95 National League and was a regular member of the team for just three seasons. During that time he failed to claim any honours at senior level.

At club level Gaynor played with the Kilruane MacDonagh's club.
