= 1975 Tipperary Senior Hurling Championship =

Annual hurling competition season

- Champions: Moneygall (1st title); Pat Sheehy (captain)
- Runners-up: Kilruane MacDonaghs; Paddy Williams (captain)

The 1975 Tipperary Senior Hurling Championship was the 84th staging of the Tipperary Senior Hurling Championship since its establishment by the Tipperary County Board in 1887.

Thurles Sarsfields were the defending champions.

The final, a replay, was played on 26 October 1975 at Semple Stadium in Thurles, between first-time finalists Moneygall and Kilruane MacDonaghs. Moneygall won the match by 3–13 to 0–05 to claim their first ever championship title.

== Results ==
=== Semi-finals ===
31 August 1975 Semi-final	Kilruane MacDonaghs	3-14 - 0-05	Silvermines	MacDonagh Park

14 September 1975 Semi-final	Moneygall	2-09 - 1-09	Moycarkey–Borris	MacDonagh Park

=== Final ===
12 October 1975 Final	Moneygall	3-09 - 3-09	Kilruane MacDonaghs	Semple Stadium
	P Ryan 1-6, S Doughan 1-2, P Sheedy 1-1.		P Williams 1-3, L Gaynor 1-1, M Waters 1-1, J Williams 0-2, L O'Shea 0-1, D Whelan 0-1.

=== Final replay ===
26 October 1975 Final replay	Moneygall	3-13 - 0-05	Kilruane MacDonaghs	Semple Stadium
	P Ryan 1-4, J Ryan 1-1, D Kennedy 1-1, P Sheedy 0-3, S Ryan 0-2, B McLeish 0-1, S Doughan 0-1.		J Williams 0-2, M Keogh 0-1, S Hennessy 0-1, D Whelan 0-1.	Referee: G Ryan (Lattin)
