= 1976 Tipperary Senior Hurling Championship =

Annual hurling competition season

- Champions: Moneygall (2nd title); Mick Doherty (captain)
- Runners-up: Roscrea; Brendan Maher (captain)

The 1976 Tipperary Senior Hurling Championship was the 85th staging of the Tipperary Senior Hurling Championship since its establishment by the Tipperary County Board in 1887.

Moneygall were the defending champions.

The final was played on 12 September 1976 at Semple Stadium in Thurles, between Moneygall and Roscrea, in what was their first ever meeting in the final. Moneygall won the match by 1–09 to 2–05 to claim their second consecutive championship title.

== Results ==
=== Semi-finals ===
22 August 1976 Semi-final	Roscrea	5-13 - 2-02	Oliver Plunketts	Semple Stadium

22 August 1976 Semi-final	Moneygall	1-13 - 1-06	Thurles Sarsfields	Semple Stadium

=== Final ===
12 September 1976 Final	Moneygall	1-09 - 2-05	Roscrea	Semple Stadium
	P Ryan 0-6, P Sheedy 1-1, P Fanning 0-1, E Ryan 0-1.		P Queally 2-0, F Loughnane 0-2, L Spooner 0-1, D Moloney 0-1, J Tynan 0-1.	Referee: G Ryan (Lattin)

== Championship statistics ==
=== Miscellaneous ===
- The final of the Tipperary Senior Football Championship was played as the curtain raiser to the hurling final. It was the first time that both county finals were played together on the same day.
