= Seán O'Meara (Tipperary hurler) =

Irish hurler

Personal information
- Native name: Seán Ó Meára (Irish)
- Nickname: Big Johnny
- Born: 1951 Cloughjordan, County Tipperary, Ireland
- Died: 6 February 2010 (aged 58) Cloughjordan; County Tipperary, Ireland
- Occupation: Post office employee

Sport
- Sport: Hurling
- Position: Full-forward
Club
- Years: Club
- 1970-1982: Kilruane MacDonaghs
Club titles
	Football	Hurling
Tipperary titles	1	3
Inter-county
Years	County	Apps (scores)
1976-1977	Tipperary	1 (0-00)
Inter-county titles
- Munster titles: 0
- All-Irelands: 0
- NHL: 0
- All Stars: 0

Seán O'Meara (1951 - 6 February 2010) was an Irish hurler. At club level he played with Kilruane MacDonaghs and was also a member of the Tipperary senior hurling team.

== Career ==
O'Meara first played hurling and Gaelic football at juvenile and underage levels with the Kilruane MacDonaghs club. He won a North Tipperary U21AFC title in 1970 before captaining the under-21 hurlers to divisional honours two years later. By that stage O'Meara had already joined the club's senior team after making his debut in 1970. He won a Tipperary SFC title in 1975 before later being part of the Kilruane senior hurling team that won three consecutive Tipperary SHC titles from 1977 to 1979.

At inter-county level, O'Meara never played at minor or under-21 levels as a hurler, however, he was drafted onto the Tipperary under-21 football team in 1972. His performances at club level resulted in O'Meara being called-up to the Tipperary senior hurling team for the 1977 Munster SHC. He made his only appearance in a drawn match with Clare as a broken finger prevented him from lining out in the replay. In retirement from playing, O'Meara served as a coach and selector at various levels with Kilruane MacDonaghs.

== Death ==
O'Meara died on 6 February 2010, aged 58.

== Honours ==
Kilruane MacDonaghs

- Tipperary Senior Football Championship: 1975
- Tipperary Senior Hurling Championship: 1977, 1978, 1979
- North Tipperary Senior Hurling Championship: 1977, 1978, 1979
- North Tipperary Senior Football Championship: 1972, 1976, 1977, 1978, 1979, 1981
