= Mike Murphy (footballer) =

English footballer

Personal information
- Full name: Michael Murphy
- Date of birth: 15 April 1939 (age 87)
- Place of birth: Reading, England
- Position: Goalkeeper

Senior career*
Years	Team	Apps	(Gls)
1958–1960	Thornycroft Athletic		(0)
1958	Reading	1	(0)
	Redhill		(0)
- * Club domestic league appearances and goals

Michael Murphy (born 15 April 1939) is an English former amateur footballer who played in the Football League Third Division South as a goalkeeper for Reading.

He also played for several amateur clubs, including Thornycroft Athletic in the Hampshire League, Redhill in the Athenian League and, while doing his National Service, Wembley in the Corinthian League. His two first team appearances for Reading were in a league match against Brentford (lost 2–1) and a London Charity Cup fixture against Queens Park Rangers (drew 1–1).
