= Mike Murphy (sports radio personality) =

American sports radio personality (born 1951)

Mike Murphy (born May 1, 1951) is an American sports radio personality, who hosted The Mike Murphy Show on Chicago's Sports Radio 670 The Score. His last show aired on June 12, 2009. He currently hosts a show on WMVP-AM every Saturday from 9 am-12 pm with Fred Huebner.

Mike "Mad Bugler" Murphy was a founding member of the Left Field Bleacher Bums, a group of dedicated Chicago Cubs fans who sat in the left field bleachers of Wrigley Field and rallied the team in the late 1960s and 70s.

== Career ==
Mike Murphy started broadcasting in April 1990 for WLS, a talk radio station in Chicago, hosting a weekly show on Sunday nights called "Fan Talk". Murph would host this show for 18 months, before he was approached by WXRT, a Chicago rock radio station, which was founding a new sports talk radio station, The Score. Murph originally hosted a weekend show on WSCR, but eventually moved to weekdays, where he hosted "The Mike Murphy Show". He currently hosts a show on Saturdays on WMVP-AM.

== The Mike Murphy Show ==
The Mike Murphy Show aired on Sports Radio 670 The Score. Segments included:

- What's Your Beef? sponsored by Brown's Chicken: Callers voiced what was "beefing" them in the world of sports. The best "beefs" deemed by Murph won gift certificates to Brown's.
- Tool Of The Week sponsored by RentalMax: Callers voiced what figure in the world of sports who had, through their actions or words, proved to be the biggest tool in the past week. The figure with the most votes was deemed "tool of the week".
- Stat Of The Week with John Dewan: Chicago sports statistician John Dewan, owner of Baseball Info Solutions, called Murph every Tuesday to give an insightful sports statistic.
- Swami Murph: The swami and his caller guest swamis gave their humorous predictions, always prefaced with "I predict...."
- Compressed Columns: Murphy reviewed sports columns of interest to him that appeared in that morning's newspapers, stating that he did so for those who did not have time to read them.
- Murph Moment: a personal opinion segment.
- Murph Minute: Murphy talked Cubs post-season baseball; also used as a promotional announcement during other programs.
- Random Tapes: A segment when an old tape recording, somewhat relevant to a current sports event, was played.
- The Fans' Court: "Judge Murphy" took calls from "jurors" on who was to blame for a sports debacle.
- Sports Spurts: Originally, callers were required to recite a grammatically correct sentence on a sports topic, making various spitting sounds for the punctuation; however, when brought back after a 5-year hiatus, most of the rules about grammar and punctuation were abolished, the only requirement being one simple sentence.

The Mike Murphy Show's theme song is sung by Howard Berk.

In June 2009, it was announced that Murphy's program would be dropped from WSCR's lineup later that month to make room for Dan McNeil's "Danny Mac Show." He remained off the air from that point, and his contract expired in May, 2010.

In June 2010, Murphy sued WSCR's ownership, CBS Radio, over a right of first refusal clause in their contract that prevented him from seeking employment within 50 miles of the station for 90 days before and 6 months after terminating employment with CBS Radio, unless he gave CBS the right to match the offer.

Mike Murphy returned to radio on WMVP-AM (1000) on Sunday April 23, 2011 from 9 a.m. to 1 p.m. during the baseball season. His co-hosts the show with Fred Huebner, whom he previously co-hosted with at WSCR.

On August 30, 2012, a conversation during an episode of the Boers and Bernstein radio show on the Score between Dan Bernstein, Laurence Holmes and Matt Abattacola, revealed that a regular contributor to Murphy's show was fictional. During many of Murphy's shows, Murphy would read emails he said were from a long time listener named Kenny Owens. However, Kenny Owens was a fictional character created by Murphy, whose emails were sent from Murphy's wife's email address, according to Abattacola (Murphy's email screener at the time). Upon finding this out, Rock Mamola, a member of Murphy's production staff at the time, called in using the moniker 'Kenny Owens' and outed Murphy's fabrication.
