= Ger O'Neill =

Irish hurler

Personal information
- Native name: Gearóid Ó Néill (Irish)
- Born: 1962 (age 63–64) Cappawhite, County Tipperary, Ireland
- Height: 5 ft 8 in (173 cm)

Sport
- Sport: Hurling
- Position: Left corner-forward
Club
- Years: Club
- Cappawhite
Club titles
- Tipperary titles: 1
Inter-county
| Years | County | Apps (scores) |
| 1982-1991 | Tipperary | 6 (2-7) |
Inter-county titles
- Munster titles: 0
- All-Irelands: 0
- NHL: 0
- All Stars: 0

Ger O'Neill (born 13 October 1962) is an Irish retired hurler who played as a corner-forward for the Tipperary senior team.

O'Neill joined the team during the 1982 championship and was a regular member of the team until his retirement almost a decade later. During that time he won one All-Ireland winners' medal as a non-playing substitute.

At club level O'Neill is a one-time county club championship winners' medalist with Cappawhite.
