= Paddy Williams =

Irish hurler

Personal information
- Native name: Pádraig Mac Uilliam (Irish)
- Born: 1949 (age 76–77) Cloughjordan, County Tipperary, Ireland

Sport
- Sport: Hurling
- Position: Right corner-back
Club
- Years: Club
- Kilruane MacDonaghs
Club titles
- Tipperary titles: 4
- Munster titles: 1
- All-Ireland Titles: 1
Inter-county*
Years	County	Apps (scores)
1973-1981	Tipperary	5 (0-00)
Inter-county titles
- Munster titles: 0
- All-Irelands: 0
- NHL: 1
- All Stars: 1
- *Inter County team apps and scores correct as of 21:05, 1 March 2017.

Patrick Williams (born 1949) is an Irish retired hurler. His league and championship career with the Tipperary senior team spanned nine seasons from 1973 to 1981.

Williams made his debut on the inter-county scene at the age of sixteen when he was selected for the Tipperary minor team. He enjoyed two championship seasons with the minor team, before, joining the under-21 team. His underage career ended without any provincial successes. Williams joined the Tipperary senior team for the 1973 championship. He remained on and off the team over the next nine seasons and won one National Hurling League medal as captain of the team in 1979.
