= Séamus Hennessy (hurler, born 1989) =

Irish hurler

Personal information
- Native name: Séamus Ó hAonasa (Irish)
- Born: 1 May 1989 (age 37) Kilruane, County Tipperary, Ireland
- Height: 1.88 m (6 ft 2 in)

Sport
- Sport: Hurling
- Position: Midfield
Club
- Years: Club
- 2006-: Kilruane MacDonagh's
Club titles
- Tipperary titles: 1
College
- Years: College
- NUI Galway
College titles
- Fitzgibbon titles: 1
Inter-county
Years	County	Apps (scores)
2009-2013	Tipperary	3 (0-1)
Inter-county titles
- All-Irelands: 1

Séamus Hennessy (born 9 October 1989) is an Irish hurler who played as a midfielder for the Tipperary senior team.

Hennessy made his first appearance for the team during the 2009 Waterford Crystal Cup. During that time he has won one All-Ireland Senior Hurling Championship winners' medal on the field of play.

At club level Hennessy plays with the Kilruane MacDonaghs club.

== Playing career ==
=== Club ===
Hennessy plays his club hurling with the Kilruane MacDonaghs club. He was part of the winning team that claimed a first Tipperary County Final victory since 1985 for Kilruane in 2022

=== University ===
During his studies at NUI Galway, Hennessy became a key member of the university hurling team. He won a Fitzgibbon Cup medal in 2010 following a 1–17 to 1–16 defeat of the Waterford Institute of Technology. He was conferred with a Master of Science (International Management) in 2012.

=== Minor and under-21 ===
Hennessy first came to prominence on the inter-county scene as a member of the Tipperary minor hurling team in 2006 as Tipperary reached the All-Ireland decider via the "back-door" in 2006. Three-in-a-row hopefuls Galway provided the opposition, however, Tipp powered to 2–18 to 2–7 victory. It was Hennessy's first All-Ireland medal in that grade.

In 2007 Hennessy won a Munster medal in that grade following an 0–18 to 1–11 defeat of Cork. Both sides met again in the All-Ireland decider, however, Cork also failed on that occasion. A 3–14 to 2–11 victory gave Hennessy a second successive All-Ireland medal.

Hennessy joined the Tipperary under-21 team in 2008 as captain. He won a Munster medal in this grade in his debut season following a controversial one-point defeat of Clare. Tipp later reached the All-Ireland, however, Hennessy's side were defeated by Kilkenny.

After surrendering their provincial crown in 2009, Tipperary bounced back the following year. A 1–22 to 1–17 defeat of Clare gave Hennessy a second Munster medal. Tipp later played Galway in the All-Ireland final and went on to trounce the westerners by 5–22 to 0–12. It was Hennessy's first All-Ireland medal in that grade.

=== Senior ===
Hennessy made his senior competitive debut for Tipperary during the pre-season Waterford Crystal Cup in 2009. Later that year he made his National Hurling League debut against Cork, however, Hennessy was an unused substitute during Tipp's subsequent championship campaign.

In 2010 Hennessy made his championship debut in a ten-point defeat by Cork. Tipperary regrouped in the qualifiers and reached a second successive All-Ireland decider. Kilkenny, a team chasing an unprecedented fifth successive championship, provided the opposition and a great game was expected. Tipperary got off to a great start which was bolstered by an early Lar Corbett goal. He subsequently completed a hat-trick of goals and Tipperary had a fourth by Noel McGrath to deny Kilkenny's drive-for-five and secure a remarkable and convincing 4–17 to 1–18 victory. Hennessy came on as a substitute in that game to claim an All-Ireland medal on the field of play.

Hennessy underwent surgery to cure a knee cartilage complaint in 2011. This injury ruled him out of the subsequent championship campaign. The injury and recuperation process proved lengthier than first thought, and Hennessy also missed the 2012 championship.

He returned to the Tipperary panel in 2013 but his knee broke down again in training, with Hennessy forced to retire from the inter-county scene because of the knee injury.

== Honours ==
=== Team ===
Tipperary

- All-Ireland Senior Hurling Championship (1): 2010
- All-Ireland Under-21 Hurling Championship (1): 2010
- Munster Under-21 Hurling Championship (2): 2008 (c), 2010
- All-Ireland Minor Hurling Championship (2): 2006, 2007
- Munster Minor Hurling Championship (1): 2007

Kilruane MacDonagh's

- Tipperary Senior Hurling Championship: 2022
