= 1962 All-Ireland Minor Hurling Championship =

All-Ireland Minor Hurling Championship 1962
All Ireland Champions
- Winners: Kilkenny (7th win)
- Captain: Joe Dunphy

All Ireland Runners-up
- Runners-up: Tipperary
- Captain: Michael "Babs" Keating

Provincial Champions
- Munster: Tipperary
- Leinster: Kilkenny
- Ulster: Antrim
- Connacht: Roscommon

The 1962 All-Ireland Minor Hurling Championship was the 32nd staging of the All-Ireland Minor Hurling Championship since its establishment by the Gaelic Athletic Association in 1928.

Kilkenny entered the championship as the defending champions in search of a third successive title.

On 2 September 1962 Kilkenny won the championship following a 3-6 to 0-9 defeat of Tipperary in the All-Ireland final. This was their third All-Ireland title in-a-row and their seventh title overall.

== Results ==
=== All-Ireland Minor Hurling Championship ===
Semi-final

12 August 1962 Semi-final	Tipperary	5-21 - 1-03	Antrim	Thurles Sportsfield, Thurles

Final

2 September 1962 Final	Kilkenny	3-06 - 0-09	Tipperary	Croke Park, Dublin
