= Paul Byrne (hurler) =

Irish hurler and teacher

Personal information
- Native name: Pól Ó Broin (Irish)
- Born: 1949 (age 76–77) Thurles, County Tipperary, Ireland

Sport
- Sport: Hurling
- Position: Left wing-forward
Club
- Years: Club
- Thurles Sarsfield's
Inter-county
| Years | County | Apps (scores) |
| 1970-1977 | Tipperary | 9 (0-3) |
Inter-county titles
- Munster titles: 1
- All-Irelands: 1
- NHL: 1
- All Stars: 0

Paul Byrne is an Irish retired sportsperson. He played hurling with his local club Thurles Sarsfield's and was a member of the Tipperary senior inter-county team in the 1960s and 1970s. Byrne won his sole set of All-Ireland and Munster winners' medals with Tipp in 1971.

Paul is an accomplished button accordion player and former primary school principal.
