= John Carey (hurler) =

Irish hurler

Personal information
- Native name: Seán Ó Ciardha (Irish)
- Born: 1949 (age 76–77) Kilcommon, County Tipperary, Ireland

Sport
- Sport: Hurling
- Position: Right corner-forward
Club
- Years: Club
- Seán Treacys
Club titles
- Tipperary titles: 0
Inter-county
Years	County	Apps (scores)
1975-1978	Tipperary	0 (0-00)
Inter-county titles
- Munster titles: 0
- All-Irelands: 0
- NHL: 0
- All Stars: 0

John Carey (born 1949) is an Irish former hurler. At club level he played with Seán Treacys and was also a member of the Tipperary senior hurling team.

== Career ==
Carey first played hurling at juvenile and underage levels with the Seán Treacys club. He was a part of the club's under-21 team that won their very first North Tipperary U21AHC title in 1970. By that stage Carey had joined the Seán Treacys senior team and won six West Tipperary SHC titles between 1968 and 1982.

At inter-county level, Carey never played at minor level, however, he was drafted onto the under-21 team in 1970. He was a member of the Tipperary senior hurling team between 1975 and 1978. In retirement from playing, Carey served the Seán Treacys club in a number of administrative capacities.

== Honours ==
Seán Treacys

- West Tipperary Senior Hurling Championship: 1968, 1973, 1974, 1977, 1978, 1979, 1982
