= Séamus Mackey =

Irish hurler

Personal information
- Native name: Séamus Mac Aodha (Irish)
- Born: Carrick-on-Suir, County Tipperary

Sport
- Sport: Hurling
- Position: Midfield
Club
- Years: Club
- 1950s-1970s: Carrick Swans
Club titles
- Tipperary titles: 0
Inter-county
- Years: County
- 1960s: Tipperary
Inter-county titles
- Munster titles: 1 (1 as sub)
- All-Irelands: 1 (1 as sub)

Séamus Mackey (born 1938 in Carrick-on-Suir, County Tipperary) is a retired Irish sportsperson. He played hurling with his local club Carrick Swans and was a member of the Tipperary senior inter-county team in the 1960s. Mackey won a set of All-Ireland and Munster titles with Tipperary as a non-playing sub in 1965.
