= Kilruane =

Townland in County Tipperary, Ireland

Kilruane (Cill Ruáin in Irish) is a townland and civil parish in the historical barony of Ormond Lower, County Tipperary in Ireland. It is located between Nenagh and Cloughjordan.

== Sport ==
Kilruane MacDonagh's GAA club grounds are located nearby in Cloughjordan.

== Buildings of note ==
The ruins of Kilruane Church of Ireland are still standing. Built with the assistance of the Board of First Fruits in 1820, the ruins display some detailed stone work. The remains of a medieval church stand within the graveyard.

== See also ==
- List of civil parishes of County Tipperary
