= 1978 Tipperary Senior Hurling Championship =

Annual hurling competition season

- Dates: 27 August - 15 October 1978
- Sponsor: 8
- Champions: Kilruane MacDonaghs (2nd title); Jim Williams (captain)
- Runners-up: Roscrea; Liam Spooner (captain)

Tournament statistics
- Matches played: 7
- Goals scored: 37 (5.29 per match)
- Points scored: 161 (23 per match)

The 1978 Tipperary Senior Hurling Championship was the 87th staging of the Tipperary Senior Hurling Championship since its establishment by the Tipperary County Board in 1887.

Kilruane MacDonaghs entered the championship as the defending champions.

On 15 October 1978, Kilruane MacDonaghs won the championship after a 2–14 to 2–13 defeat of Roscrea in the final at Semple Stadium. It was their second championship title overall and their second title in succession.

== Results ==
=== Quarter-finals ===
27 August 1977 Quarter-final	Kilruane MacDonaghs	2-15 - 2-11	Cappawhite	Semple Stadium
	J Williams 1-2, S O'Meara 1-1, E O'Shea 0-4, L O'Shea 0-2, S Hennessy 0-2, J Reddan 0-2, D Whelan 0-1, S Kehoe 0-1.		P O'Neill 1-3, A Buckley 1-0, M McDermott 0-3, J O'Neill 0-3, E Ryan 0-1, M McDermott 0-1.

27 August 1977 Quarter-final	Roscrea	2-20 - 2-08	Seán Treacys	Semple Stadium
	F Loughnane 0-10, J Tynan 1-1, P Queally 0-4, J Stone 1-0, L Spooner 0-3, T O'Connor 0-1, D Moloney 0-1.		D Ryan 2-0, P Quigley 0-6, F Berkery 0-2.

27 August 1977 Quarter-final	Drom-Inch	2-15 - 3-07	Carrick Swans	Clonmel GAA Ground
	E Butler 1-2, J Harkins 1-2, G Doherty 0-5, T Butler 0-4, J Kennedy 0-1, P Ryan 0-1.		J Kehoe 1-3, Maurice Walsh 1-1, Michael Walsh 1-0, T Kirby 0-1, T Russell 0-1, P PHelan 0-1.

27 August 1977 Quarter-final	Holycross-Ballycahill	4-14 - 4-06	Fionn MacCumhaill	Clonmel GAA Ground
	S Mackey 2-5, T Stakelum 1-3, J Ferncombe 1-0, M Doyle 0-3, P Lowry 0-1, R Stakelum 0-1, M Quinlan 0-1.		M Brennan 1-2, M McGrath 1-0, J Cahill 1-0, B Perry 1-0, J Molloy 0-2, J Ivors 0-1, Jim Molloy 0-1.

=== Semi-finals ===
17 September 1978 Semi-final	Kilruane MacDonaghs	3-13 - 2-06	Holycross-Ballycahill	MacDonagh Park
	J Williams 1-3, S Hennessy 0-5, L O'Shea 1-1, S O'Meara 1-0, M Keogh 0-3, L Gaynor 0-1.		M Doyle 1-1, S Mackey 0-4, P Lowry 1-0, J Fitzpatrick 0-1.

17 September 1978 Semi-final	Roscrea	4-13 - 3-06	Drom-Inch	MacDonagh Park
	J Spooner 1-2, F Loughnane 0-5, G O'Connor 1-1, J Tynan 1-1, P Queally 1-0, J Stone 0-2, D Moloney 0-1, T O'Connor 0-1.		T Butler 2-1, J Harkins 0-4, G Doherty 1-0, P Butler 0-1.

=== Final ===
15 October 1978 Final	Kilruane MacDonaghs	2-14 - 2-13	Roscrea	Semple Stadium
	S Hennessy 0-12, S O'Meara 1-0, Gilbert Williams 1-0, E O'Shea 0-1, L O'Shea 0-1.		F Loughnane 1-11, J Stone 1-0, L Spooner 0-1, G O'Connor 0-1.	Referee: L Ryan (Holycross-Ballycahill)

== Championship statistics ==
=== Top scorers ===
Overall

Rank	Player	Club	Tally	Total	Matches	Average
1	Francis Loughnane	Roscrea	1-26	29	3	9.66
2	Séamus Hennessy	Kilruane MacDonaghs	0-19	19	3	6.33
3	Séamus Mackey	Holycross-Ballycahill	2-09	15	2	7.50
4	Tommy Butler	Drom-Inch	2-05	11	2	5.50
4	Jim Williams	Kilruane MacDonaghs	2-05	11	3	3.66
6	Seán O'Meara	Kilruane MacDonaghs	3-01	10	3	3.33
7	John Harkin	Drom-Inch	1-06	9	2	4.50
8	John Stone	Roscrea	2-02	8	3	2.66
8	Joe Tynan	Roscrea	2-02	8	3	2.66
8	Ger Doherty	Drom-Inch	1-05	8	2	4.00

In a single game

Rank	Player	Club	Tally	Total	Opposition
1	Francis Loughnane	Roscrea	1-11	14	Kilruane MacDonaghs
2	Séamus Hennessy	Kilruane MacDonaghs	0-12	12	Roscrea
3	Séamus Mackey	Holycross-Ballycahill	2-05	11	Fionn MacCumhaill
4	Francis Loughnane	Roscrea	0-10	10	Seán Treacys
5	Tommy Butler	Drom-Inch	2-01	7	Roscrea
6	Dinny Ryan	Seán Treacys	2-00	6	Roscrea
6	Pat O'Neill	Cappawhite	1-03	6	Kilruane MacDonaghs
6	Jim Kehoe	Carrick Swans	1-03	6	Drom-Inch
6	Tony Stakelum	Holycross-Ballycahill	1-03	6	Fionn MacCumhaill
6	Jim Williams	Kilruane MacDonaghs	1-03	6	Holycross-Ballycahill
6	Pat Quigley	Seán Treacys	0-06	6	Roscrea
