= Seán Treacy's GAA (Tipperary) =

Gaelic games club in County Tipperary, Ireland

Sean Treacy's GAA
- Cumann Sheáin Uí Threasaigh
- Founded: 1962
- County: Tipperary
- Colours: Blue and Gold
- Grounds: Kilcommon
- Coordinates: 52.6794°N 8.1637°W

Playing kits
Standard colours

Sean Treacy's GAA is a Tipperary GAA club which is located in County Tipperary, Ireland. Both hurling and Gaelic football are played in the West-Tipperary divisional competitions. The club is centred on the parish of Hollyford, Kilcommon and Rearcross in the Slieve Felim Hills, west of Thurles. and close to the county boundary with Limerick. The Club is named after Old IRA member Sean Treacy.

== Achievements ==
- West Tipperary Senior Hurling Championship (7) 1968, 1973, 1974, 1977, 1978, 1979, 1982
- Tipperary Intermediate Hurling Championship (1) 2019
- Tipperary Junior A Football Championship (1) 2023
- West Tipperary Intermediate Hurling Championship (3) 2003, 2016, 2018
- West Tipperary Crosco Cup Hurling (5) 1973,1974,1978,2022,2023
- West Tipperary Junior A Football Championship (5) 2011, 2012, 2016, 2019, 2022
- West Tipperary Junior B Football Championship (3) 1998, 2005, 2009
- Tipperary Junior A Hurling Championship (1) 1966
- West Tipperary Junior A Hurling Championship (4) 1966, 1972, 2000, 2001
- West Tipperary Junior 2 Hurling Championship (2)1974, 1977
- West Tipperary Junior B Hurling League (1) 2024
- Tipperary Under-21 B Football Championship (1) 1999
- West Tipperary Under-21 B Football Championship (1) 1999
- Tipperary Under-21 C Football Championship (1) 2008
- West Tipperary Under-21 C Football Championship (2) 2007, 2008
- West Tipperary Under-21 A Hurling Championship (3) 1970, 2015 (with Cappawhite), 2016 (with Cappawhite)
- Tipperary County Under-21 B Hurling Championship (1) 1990 (with Aherlow)
- West Tipperary Under-21 B Hurling Championship (5) 1989, 1990 (with Aherlow), 1997, 2014 (with Cappawhite),2019 (with Emly)
- Tipperary Under-21 C Hurling Championship (1) 2008
- West Tipperary Under-21 C Hurling Championship (1) 2007
- West Tipperary Under-19 B Hurling Championship (2) 2021,2023 {with Eire Og}
- West Tipperary Minor C Football Championship (1) 2001
- West Tipperary Minor A Hurling Championship (Hollyford / Kilcommon / Glengar under the name Seán Treacys) (1) 1942
- West Tipperary Minor B Hurling Championship (3) 2005, 2013(with Emly), 2014(with Emly)
- West Tipperary Minor B Shield championship (1) 2020(with Emly)
- Tipperary Minor C Hurling Championship (1) 2003
- West Tipperary Minor C Hurling Championship (2) 2001, 2003

== Notable players ==
- John Carey
