= 1977 Tipperary Senior Hurling Championship =

Annual hurling competition season

- Dates: 28 August - 23 October 1977
- Teams: 8
- Champions: Kilruane MacDonaghs (1st title); Dinny Cahill (captain)
- Runners-up: Borris-Ileigh; Pat Maher (captain)

Tournament statistics
- Matches played: 8
- Goals scored: 20 (2.5 per match)
- Points scored: 148 (18.5 per match)
- Top scorer(s): Séamus Hennessy (2-14)

The 1977 Tipperary Senior Hurling Championship was the 86th staging of the Tipperary Senior Hurling Championship since its establishment by the Tipperary County Board in 1887.

Moneygall were the defending champions.

On 23 October 1977, Kilruane MacDonaghs won the championship after a 1–05 to 0–05 defeat of Borris-Ileigh in a final replay at Semple Stadium. It was their first ever championship title.

== Results ==
=== Quarter-finals ===
28 August 1977 Quarter-final	Kilruane MacDonaghs	4-14 - 1-05	Carrick Swans	Semple Stadium
	S O'Meara 1-3, S Hennessy 0-6, J Reddan 1-0, D Whelan 1-0, E O'Shea 1-0, J Williams 0-3, M Keogh 0-1, L O'Shea 0-1.		N Russell 1-0, J Kehoe 0-3, T Fitzpatrick 0-2.

28 August 1977 Quarter-final	Borris-Ileigh	1-10 - 0-10	Carrick Davins	Semple Stadium
	M Stapleton 1-1, N Maher 0-3, T O'Dwyer 0-3, P Ryan 0-3, N O'Dwyer 0-1.		PJ Ryan 0-3, M Ryan 0-2, T Foran 0-2, T Russell 0-1, K Cronin 0-1, J Walsh 0-1.

28 August 1977 Quarter-final	Seán Treacys	1-13 - 0-09	Holycross-Ballycahill	Leahy Park
	J Carey 1-5, P Quigley 0-6, S Quigley 0-1, D Ryan 0-1.		S Mackey 0-7, R Stakelum 0-1, M McGrath 0-1.

28 August 1977 Quarter-final	Moyne-Templetuohy	2-12 - 1-06	Kickhams	Leahy Park
	W Fogarty 0-7, W O'Grady 1-1, E Kelly 1-0, P Sweeney 0-2, L Everard 0-1, D Kelly 0-1.		P Hayes 0-4, R Kennedy 1-0, J Keane 0-2.

=== Semi-finals ===
18 September 1977 Semi-final	Kilruane MacDonaghs	3-09 - 1-12	Seán Treacys	Semple Stadium
	J Williams 1-3, S Hennessy 1-2, P Williams 1-1, E O'Shea 0-2, J Reddan 0-1.		J Carey 0-4, P Quigley 0-4, F Berkery 1-0, D Carey 0-1, D Ryan 0-1, P Ryan 0-1, JJ Ryan 0-1.

18 September 1977 Semi-final	Borris-Ileigh	1-11 - 1-08	Moyne-Templetuohy	Semple Stadium
	M Stapleton 1-1, P Kavanagh 0-4, N Maher 0-2, L Carroll 0-2, T O'Dwyer 0-1, B Kenny 0-1.		W Fogarty 0-5, T Quinlan 1-0, E Kelly 0-1, M O'Grady 0-1, W O'Grady 0-1.

=== Final ===
2 October 1977 Final	Kilruane MacDonaghs	1-11 - 2-08	Borris-Ileigh	Semple Stadium
	S Hennessy 0-5, J Williams 1-1, L O'Shea 0-2, Ger Williams 0-1, E O'Shea 0-1, J Reddan 0-1.		P Kavanagh 1-2, M Stapleton 1-0, T O'Dwyer 0-3, B Kenny 0-1, L Carroll 0-1, N Maher 0-1,

23 October 1977 Final replay	Kilruane MacDonaghs	1-05 - 0-05	Borris-Ileigh	Semple Stadium
	S Hennessy 1-1, L O'Shea 0-2, Ger Williams 0-1, S O'Meara 0-1.		P Kavanagh 0-3, N Maher 0-1, B Kenny 0-1.

== Championship statistics ==
=== Top scorers ===
Overall

Rank	Player	Club	Tally	Total	Matches	Average
1	Séamus Hennessy	Kilruane MacDonaghs	2-14	20	4	5.00
2	Jim Williams	Kilruane MacDonaghs	2-07	13	4	3.25
3	John Carey	Seán Treacys	1-09	12	2	6.00
3	Pat Kavanagh	Borris-Ileigh	1-09	12	3	4.00
3	Willie Fogarty	Moyne-Templetuohy	0-12	12	2	6.00

In a single game

Rank	Player	Club	Tally	Total	Opposition
1	John Carey	Seán Treacys	1-05	8	Holycross-Ballycahill
2	Séamus Mackey	Holycross-Ballycahill	0-07	7	Seán Treacys
2	Willie Fogarty	Moyne-Templetuohy	0-07	7	Kickhams
4	Seán O'Meara	Kilruane MacDonaghs	1-03	6	Carrick Swans
4	Jim Williams	Kilruane MacDonaghs	1-03	6	Seán Treacys
4	Séamus Hennessy	Kilruane MacDonaghs	0-06	6	Carrick Swans
4	Pat Quigley	Seán Treacys	0-06	6	Holycross-Ballycahill
8	Séamus Hennessy	Kilruane MacDonaghs	1-02	5	Seán Treacys
8	Pat Kavanagh	Borris-Ileigh	1-02	5	Kilruane MacDonaghs
8	Séamus Hennessy	Kilruane MacDonaghs	0-05	5	Borris-Ileigh
8	Willie Fogarty	Moyne-Templetuohy	0-05	5	Borris-Ileigh
