= 1978–79 National Hurling League =

48th season of the National Hurling League

League details
- Dates: 15 October 1978 – 6 May 1979

League champions
- Winners: Tipperary (14th win)

Other division winners
- Division 2: Kerry

The 1978–79 National Hurling League was the 48th season of the National Hurling League.

== Division 1 ==
National Hurling League Division 1
- Season: 1978-79
- Champions: Tipperary; 14th National League title Captain: Paddy Williams
- Relegated: Carlow
- All statistics correct as of 1 March 2017.

Clare came into the season as defending champions of the 1977-78 season. Carlow entered Division 1 as the promoted team.

On 6 May 1979, Tipperary won the title after a 3–15 to 0–8 win over Galway in the final. It was their 14th league title overall and their first since 1967-68.

Carlow were relegated from Division 1 after just one season in the top flight.

=== Division 1A table ===
Pos	Team	Pld	W	D	L	Pts	Notes
1	Clare	6	5	1	0	11	
2	Galway	6	3	2	1	8	Division 1 runners-up
3	Limerick	6	3	1	2	7	
4	Offaly	6	2	2	2	6	
5	Kilkenny	6	2	0	4	4	
6	Waterford	6	2	0	4	4	Relegated to Division 1B
7	Wexford	6	1	0	5	2	Relegated to Division 1B

=== Group stage ===
1 October 1978	Galway	3-12 - 0-18	Wexford	Pearse Stadium, Salthill
	PJ Molloy 2-2, F Gantley 1-5, P Fahy 0-1, I Clarke 0-1, M Connolly 0-1, J Connolly 0-1, N Lane 0-1.		N Buggy 0-12, J Quigley 0-3, T Doran 0-1, M Quigley 0-1, M Casey 0-1.	Referee: N O'Driscoll (Clare)

1 October 1978	Offaly	2-8 - 2-8	Clare	St. Brendan's Park, Birr
	P Horan 2-2, P Kirwan 0-2, P Delaney 0-1, P Carroll 0-1, K Mooney 0-1, M Cashin 0-1.		E O'Connor 1-2, C Honan 0-5, N Casey 1-1.	Referee: S O'Connor (Limerick)

15 October 1978	Clare	3-6 - 1-6	Waterford	Dr. Daly Park, Tulla
	J Callinan 1-2, C Honan 1-0, B Gilligan 1-0, M Murphy 0-2, F Quilligan 0-1, S Stack 0-1.		P Daly 1-1, T Casey 0-2, P Egan 0-1, M Whelan 0-1, M Walsh 0-1.	Referee: M Duggan (Limerick)

15 October 1978	Kilkenny	5-6 - 3-13	Galway	Nowlan Park, Kilkenny
	M Ruth 3-1, J Lyng 1-1, T Malone 1-0, M Kennedy 0-2, F Cummins 0-2.		Joe Connolly 1-3, PJ Molloy 1-2, M Connolly 0-4, M Conneely 1-0, F Gantley 0-2, John Connolly 0-2.	Referee: J Moloney (Tipperary)

15 October 1978	Wexford	0-17 - 2-17	Offaly	Páirc Uí Shíocháin, Gorey
	N Buggy 0-5, M Quigley 0-5, T Doran 0-3, B Rowesome 0-2, C Kehoe 0-1, M Butler 0-1.		T Kirwan 1-6, J Kelly 1-2, J Mooney 0-2, B Bermingham 0-2, P Delaney 0-1, D Egan 0-1, K Mooney 0-1, M Kennedy 0-1, P Carroll 0-1.	Referee: M Meally (Kilkenny)

29 October 1978	Offaly	3-10 - 2-6	Kilkenny	St. Brendan's Park, Birr
	P Carroll 1-3, P Kirwan 0-5, P Horan 1-0, J Kelly 1-0, B Bermingham 0-1, P Delaney 0-1.		B Fitzpatrick 1-4, F Cummins 1-0, T Malone 0-1, G Fennelly 0-1.

29 October 1978	Waterford	2-12 - 4-12	Wexford	Walsh Park, Waterford
	D Fitzpatrick 0-5, M Walsh 0-4, P Daly 1-0, J Greene 1-0, K Ryan 0-2, J Galvin 0-1.		N Buggy 2-4, B Murphy 2-1, J Murphy 0-3, R Kinsella 0-3, M Maher 0-1.

12 November 1978	Wexford	3-8 - 3-11	Clare	St. Patrick's Park, Enniscorthy
	N Buggy 1-4, N Goff 1-0, M Quigley 0-2, P Courtney 0-1, M Maher 0-1.		N Casey 2-0, E O'Connor 1-0, S Hehir 0-3, C Honan 0-2, P O'Connor 0-2, B Gilligan 0-2, J McNamara 0-1, M Murphy 0-1.	Referee: JJ Landers (Waterford)

12 November 1978	Limerick	2-14 - 0-8	Offaly	Gaelic Grounds, Limerick
	E Cregan 2-7, P Kelly 0-3, E Grimes 0-2, J McKenna 0-2.		P Kirwan 0-4, B Keeshan 0-1, J Kelly 0-1, D Egan 0-1, J Mooney 0-1.	Referee: J Woods (Clare)

12 November 1978	Kilkenny	3-12 - 4-7	Waterford	Nowlan Park, Kilkenny
	M Ruth 2-1, J Lyng 1-1, B Fitzpatrick 0-5, G Fennelly 0-3, F Cummins 0-1, H Ryan 0-1.		J Crean 2-2, P Daly 1-0, M Ormond 1-0, T Casey 0-3, M Whelan 0-1, M Walsh 0-1.	Referee: J Moloney (Tipperary)

19 November 1978	Limerick	1-8 - 0-10	Kilkenny	Gaelic Grounds, Limerick
	E Cregan 0-6, S Condon 1-0, J McKenna 0-2.		B Fitzpatrick 0-7, M Brennan 0-3.	Referee: S Brennan (Galway)

26 November 1978	Clare	0-10 - 0-6	Kilkenny	Dr. Daly Park, Tulla
	M Moroney 0-3, N Casey 0-3, C Honan 0-2, P O'Connor 0-2.		B Fitzpatrick 0-3, M Brennan 0-1, T Malone 0-1, M Ruth 0-1.	Referee: G Ryan (Tipperary)

26 November 1978	Offaly	1-9 - 0-12	Galway	St. Brendan's Park, Birr
	P Kirwan 1-5, P Carroll 0-1, P Delaney 0-1, M Kennedy 0-1, K Mooney 0-1.		J Connolly 0-6, F Gantley 0-2, M Conneely 0-1, S Mahon 0-1, M Connolly 0-1, J Greaney 0-1.	Referee: J O'Grady (Limerick)

26 November 1978	Waterford	4-10 - 3-3	Limerick	Fraher Field, Dungarvan
	E Connors 2-0, T Casey 0-6, J Greene 1-2, P Egan 1-0, M Walsh 0-2.		J McKenna 2-0, E Cregan 1-2, P Kelly 0-1.	Referee: J Denton (Wexford)

10 December 1978	Galway	2-5 - 0-11	Limerick	Duggan Park, Ballinasloe
	F Gantley 1-1, John Connolly 1-0, N Lane 0-2, PJ Molloy 0-1, M Connolly 0-1.		E Cregan 0-3, G Moloney 0-3, L O'Donoghue 0-1, W FItzmaurice 0-1, J McKenna 0-1.	Referee: G Kirwan (Offaly)

11 February 1979	Limerick	1-7 - 2-7	Clare	Gaelic Grounds, Limerick
	J McKenna 1-1, E Grimes 0-2, O O'Connor 0-2, E Cregan 0-2.		N Casey 1-0, B Gilligan 1-0, C Honan 0-3, M Moroney 0-3, S Hehir 0-1.	Referee: G Kirwan (Offaly)

25 February 1979	Waterford	1-14 - 1-8	Offaly	Fraher Field, Dungarvan
	T Casey 0-10, K Ryan 1-1, M Walsh 0-3.		K Mooney 1-0, P Kirwan 0-3, P Delaney 0-3, E Coughlan 0-1, M Cleere 0-1.	Referee: N O'Donoghue (Dublin)

25 February 1979	Clare	3-8 - 2-9	Galway	Dr. Daly Park, Tulla
	J Callanan 1-1, N Casey 1-1, P O'Connor 1-0, C Honan 0-3, G Loughnane 0-1, B Gilligan 0-1, S Lynch 0-1.		A Fenton 2-0, J Connolly 0-5, M Connolly 0-2, I Clarke 0-1, J Connolly 0-1.	Referee: G Kirwan (Offay)

25 February 1979	Wexford	1-9 - 0-13	Limerick	O'Kennedy Park, New Ross
	N Buggy 0-5, J Holohan 0-2, C Doran 0-1, M Butler 0-1.		J McKenna 0-3, O O'Connor 0-3, E Cregan 0-3, L O'Donoghue 0-2, W Fitzmaurice 0-1, E Grimes 0-1.

4 March 1979	Galway	0-15 - 1-9	Waterford	Duggan Park, Ballinasloe
	John Connolly 0-8, Joe Connolly 0-2, PJ Molloy 0-2, N Lane 0-1, M Connolly 0-1.		T Casey 0-4, P Daly 1-0, M Ormonde 0-2, K Ryan 0-1, J Greene 0-1.	Referee: N O'Donoghue (Dublin)

8 April 1979	Kilkenny	1-10 - 1-9	Wexford	Nowlan Park, Kilkenny
	L O'Brien 0-5, K Fennelly 1-0, B Fitzpatrick 0-2, M Brennan 0-2, J Mulcahy 0-1.		N Goff 1-0, N Buggy 0-5, M Casey 0-2, T Doran 0-1, C Keogh 0-1.	Referee: J Moloney (Tipperary)

=== Division 1B table ===
Pos	Team	Pld	W	D	L	Pts	Notes
1	Tipperary	6	6	0	0	12	Division 1 champions
2	Cork	6	5	0	1	10	Promoted to Division 1A
3	Antrim	6	3	0	3	6	
4	Dublin	6	3	0	3	6	
5	Laois	6	2	0	4	4	
6	Kildare	6	1	0	5	2	
7	Carlow	6	1	0	5	2	Relegated to Division 2

=== Group stage ===
1 October 1978	Antrim	3-7 - 1-15	Laois	Corrigan Park, Belfast
	J Crossey 1-1, R McDonnell 1-1, P Boyle 0-4, D McNaughton 1-0, S Donnelly 0-1.		F Keenan 0-6, J Mahon 1-1, Mick Cuddy 0-4, M Walsh 0-2, L O'Shaughnessy 0-1, C Jones 0-1.	Referee: N O'Donoghue (Dublin)

8 October 1978	Laois	3-5 - 5-11	Cork	O'Moore Park, Portlaoise
	F Keenan 2-3, Mick Cuddy 1-1, M Walsh 0-1.		S O'Leary 2-3, J Allen 2-1, E O'Donoghue 1-0, C McCarthy 0-3, D Herlihy 0-1, P Horgan 0-1, J Fenton 0-1, D McCurtain 0-1.	Referee: D Nealon (Tipperary)

15 October 1978	Kildare	4-11 - 5-14	Antrim	Sallins Road, Naas
	J Walsh 1-5, T Walsh 2-1, P White 0-2, V Moore 0-1, P Dooley 0-1.		P McFall 2-4, B McGaughtey 2-1, D McNaughton 1-2, M O'Connell 0-4, J Crotty 0-1, P McIlhatton 0-1.	Referee: E Keddy (Wicklow)

29 October 1978	Antrim	3-9 - 4-5	Dublin	Glenravel
	J Crossey 3-1, M O'Connell 0-3, E Donnelly 0-3, B McGaughey 0-1, S McNaughton 0-1.		L Henneberry 1-2, D Murphy 1-1, J Towell 1-1, M Holden 1-0, J McCarthy 0-1.

29 October 1978	Cork	0-18 - 1-8	Kildare	Páirc Uí Chaoimh, Cork
	S O'Leary 0-8, J Barry-Murphy 0-3, J Horgan 0-2, J Allen 0-2, J Stenson 0-1, T Crowley 0-1, P Moylan 0-1.		M O'Connell 1-2, J Walsh 0-3, J O'Connell 0-1, J Tompkins 0-1, T Johnson 0-1.

29 October 1978	Carlow	4-6 - 1-10	Laois	Dr. Cullen Park, Carlow
	T Kelly 1-2, P Kehoe 1-0, P Foley 1-0, J Kavanagh 1-0, W Cullen 0-3, G Hughes 0-1.		F Keenan 0-4, P Dollard 1-0, J Phelan 0-2, J Mahon 0-1, P Dunphy 0-1, M Walsh 0-1, M Cuddy 0-1.

12 November 1978	Dublin	2-11 - 4-11	Cork	Croke Park, Dublin
	V Holden 1-1, M Holden 1-1, D Murphy 0-3, J McCarthy 0-2, P Carton 0-1, D Gaule 0-1, T Naughton 0-1, T McSweeney 0-1.		E O'Donoghue 2-0, J Barry-Murphy 2-0, C McCarthy 0-3, S O'Leary 0-2, P Moylan 0-1, R Cummins 0-1, J Crowley 0-1.

12 November 1978	Laois	1-3 - 3-15	Tipperary	Kelly Daly Park, Rathdowney
	T Duggan 1-0, M Mahon 0-1, M Walsh 0-1, D Doyle 0-1.		T Butler 1-6, P O'Neill 1-4, K Fox 1-1, J Kehoe 0-1, B Kenny 0-1, P Queally 0-1, M Brophy 0-1.	Referee: M Slattery (Clare)

12 November 1978	Kildare	3-13 - 4-8	Carlow	Geraldine Park, Athy
	J Walsh 1-6, M O'Connell 1-2, J Tompkins 1-1, T White 0-2, P White 0-1, T Johnson 0-1.		E Quirke 2-4, J Doyle 1-0, P Kavanagh 1-0, P Quirke 0-2, M Murphy 0-1, W Cullen 0-1.	Referee: C Foley (Dublin)

19 November 1978	Dublin	2-11 - 0-9	Kildare	Croke Park, Dublin
	A McSweeney 1-1, J Hackett 0-4, M Holden 1-0, P Carton 0-3, J McCarthy 0-2, T Naughton 0-1.		J Walsh 0-8, T Johnson 0-1.	Referee: K Campbell (Meath)

26 November 1978	Tipperary	5-11 - 3-5	Kildare	Semple Stadium, Thurles
	D Butler 2-1, F Loughnane 0-6, P Queally 1-1, S Fox 1-0, J Kehoe 1-0, J Grace 0-2, N O'Dwyer 0-1.		J Tompkins 1-0, J O'Leary 1-0, J White 1-0, A Lynch 0-2.	Referee: G Kirwan (Offaly)

26 November 1978	Cork	1-11 - 0-10	Antrim	Páirc Uí Chaoimh, Cork
	C McCarthy 1-2, E O'Donoghue 0-3, J Allen 0-2, P Moylan 0-2, J Buckley 0-1, R Cummins 0-1.		E Donnelly 0-3, J Crossan 0-2, M O'Connell 0-2, D McLoughlin 0-2, P McFall 0-1.	Referee: J Landers (Waterford)

26 November 1978	Carlow	0-4 - 5-9	Dublin	Dr. Cullen Park, Carlow
	E Quirke 0-3, P Quirke 0-1.		M Holden 2-3, D Murphy 1-2, T McSweeny 1-1, J Towell 1-0, D Kavanagh 0-2, J Hackett 0-1.

17 December 1978	Tipperary	8-14 - 0-5	Carlow	Semple Stadium, Thurles
	P O'Neill 1-6, T Butler 2-1, T Sheppard 2-1, E O'Shea 1-4, J Guilfoyle 1-0, J Kehoe 0-3.		W Cullen 0-2, J Kavanagh 0-2, J Murphy 0-1.

28 January 1979	Cork	1-10 - 2-11	Tipperary	Páirc Uí Chaoimh, Cork
	J Barry-Murphy 1-1, P Moylan 0-4, J Fenton 0-2, T Cashman 0-1, E O'Donoghue 0-1, J Horgan 0-1.		F Loughnane 0-7, P O'Neill 1-2, T Butler 1-0, S Bourke 0-1, P Queally 0-1.	Referee: N Dalton (Waterford)

11 February 1979	Dublin	1-8 - 2-11	Tipperary	Croke Park, Dublin
	J Morris 1-1, J Towell 0-2, D Kavanagh 0-2, D Murphy 0-2, J Carton 0-1.		F Loughnane 2-3, N O'Dwyer 0-3, J Williams 0-1, P O'Neill 0-1, S Bourke 0-1.	Referee: M Kelleher (Kildare)

11 February 1979	Antrim	5-12 - 3-5	Carlow	Corrigan Park, Belfast
	B Donnelly 2-4, S McNaughton 2-1, C Ward 1-1, M O'Connell 0-3, J Crossey 0-2, E Donnelly 0-1.		E Quirke 1-5, M Murphy 1-0, W Cullen 1-0.

11 February 1979	Kildare	1-7 - 1-12	Laois	Geraldine Park, Athy
	J Walsh 0-5, V Moore 1-0, M Moore 0-1.		M Walsh 0-6, F Keenan 0-5, M Cuddy 1-0, D Doyle 0-1.

25 February 1979	Laois	3-8 - 5-6	Dublin	Dr. Daly Park, Tulla
	F Keenan 1-5, J Mahon 2-1, B Bohane 0-1, D O'Loughlin 0-1.		M Holden 2-0, P Carton 1-1, J Cunningham 0-4, J Morris 1-0, J Towell 1-0, J McCarthy 0-1.	Referee: N Clarke (Westmeath)

25 February 1979	Tipperary	3-14 - 0-6	Antrim	Semple Stadium, Thurles
	F Loughnane 1-7, P O'Neill 1-3, S Bourke 1-1, N O'Dwyer 0-2, T Butler 0-1.		S Collins 0-1, M O'Connell 0-1, C Ward 0-1, D McNaughton 0-1, E Donnelly 0-1, S McNaughton 0-1.	Referee: J Woods (Clare)

25 February 1979	Carlow	0-5 - 3-13	Cork	Dr. Cullen Park, Carlow
	R Moore 0-2, C Hughes 0-2, E Quirke 0-1.		G McCarthy 2-3, S O'Leary 1-1, C McCarthy 0-3, P Moylan 0-2, J Fenton 0-2, T Crowley 0-1, P Horgan 0-1.	Referee: J Denton (Wexford)

=== Play-off ===
29 April 1979 Play-off	Kilkenny	1-12 - 0-9	Waterford	O'Kennedy Park, New Ross
	L O'Brien 1-3, M Brennan 0-3, J Hennessy 0-2, G Fennelly 0-2, J Mulcahy 0-1, B Fitzpatrick 0-1.		M Walsh 0-3, P McGrath 0-1, J Dalton 0-1, N Connors 0-1, K Ryan 0-1, M Ormonde 0-1, T Casey 0-1.	Referee: G Ryan (Tipperary)

=== Knock-out stage ===
Quarter-finals

1 April 1979 Quarter-final	Limerick	2-12 - 2-11	Cork	Semple Stadium, Thurles
	J McKenna 2-3, E Cregan 0-2, O O'Connor 0-2, E Grimes 0-2, G Moloney 0-1, S Foley 0-1, M Carroll 0-1.		J Fenton 2-0, C McCarthy 0-3, S O'Leary 0-3, P Moylan 0-2, E O'Donoghue 0-1, J Barry-Murphy 0-1, T Crowley 0-1.	Referee: J Woods (Clare)

8 April 1979 Quarter-final	Tipperary	1-17 - 4-8	Offaly	Nowlan Park, Kilkenny
	F Loughnane 1-5, P Queally 0-5, P O'Neill 0-3, P Fitzell 0-2, J Kehoe 0-1, N O'Dwyer 0-1.		P Kirwan 1-4, P Horan 1-2, M Cleere 1-0, J Kelly 1-0, P Carroll 0-2.	Referee: N O'Donoghue (Dublin)

15 April 1979 Quarter-final replay	Tipperary	1-18 - 0-10	Offaly	Croke Park, Dublin
	E O'Shea 1-4, F Loughnane 0-4, N O'Dwyer 0-3, M Doyle 0-3, S Bourke 0-2, P O'Neill 0-1, P Queally 0-1.		P Kirwan 0-6, P Delaney 0-1, J Kelly 0-1, M Cleere 0-1, P Horan 0-1.	Referee: N O'Donoghue (Dublin)

Semi-finals

15 April 1979 Semi-final	Galway	1-15 – 4-5	Limerick	Semple Stadium, Thurles
	PJ Molloy 0-8, P Ryan 1-0, S Mahon 0-3, John Connolly 0-2, F Burke 0-1, F Gantley 0-1.		J McKenna 2-0, E Cregan 1-3, P Kelly 1-0, W Fitzmaurice 0-1, O O'Connor 0-1.	Referee: J Rankins (Laois)

16 April 1979 Semi-final	Tipperary	2-13 – 2-12	Clare	Gaelic Grounds, Limerick
	F Loughnane 0-8, P Queally 1-0, T Butler 1-0, E O'Shea 0-2, S Power 0-1, M Doyle 0-1, J Kehoe 0-1.		P O'Connor 1-2, C Honan 1-2, M Moroney 0-3, J Callinan 0-3, S Stack 0-1, B Gilligan 0-1.	Referee: N O'Donoghue (Dublin)

Final

6 May 1979 Final	Tipperary	3-15 – 0-8	Galway	Gaelic Grounds, Limerick
	J Kehoe 1-6, F Loughnane 1-4, P Queally 1-0, N O'Dwyer 0-2, G Stapleton 0-1, M Doyle 0-1, S Power 0-1.		PJ Molloy 0-3, John Connolly 0-3, Joe Connolly 0-1, M Connolly 0-1.	Attendance: 27,203; Referee: J Rankins (Laois)

=== Scoring statistics ===
Top scorers overall

Rank	Player	Team	Tally	Total
1	Francis Loughnane	Tipperary	5-44	59
2	Ned Buggy	Wexford	3-35	44
3	Éamonn Cregan	Limerick	4-28	40

== Division 2 ==
National Hurling League Division 2
- Season: 1978-79
- Champions: Kerry
- Matches: 15
- All statistics correct as of 2 March 2017.

Kerry won the title after a 3–7 to 3–4 win over Meath in the final round of the group stage.

=== Division 2 table ===
Pos	Team	Pld	W	D	L	Pts	Notes
1	Kerry	5	4	0	1	8	Division 2 champions
2	Westmeath	5	3	1	1	7	
3	Meath	5	2	1	2	5	
4	Down	5	2	0	3	4	
5	Wicklow	5	0	3	2	3	
6	Roscommon	5	1	1	3	3	
