= 1979 Tipperary Senior Hurling Championship =

Annual hurling competition season

- Dates: 19 August - 7 October 1979
- Teams: 8
- Champions: Kilruane MacDonaghs (3rd title); Liam O'Shea (captain)
- Runners-up: Thurles Sarsfields; Michael Dundon (captain)

Tournament statistics
- Matches played: 7
- Goals scored: 30 (4.29 per match)
- Points scored: 168 (24 per match)
- Top scorer(s): Séamus Hennessy (0-23)

The 1979 Tipperary Senior Hurling Championship was the 88th staging of the Tipperary Senior Hurling Championship since its establishment by the Tipperary County Board in 1887.

Kilruane MacDonaghs entered the championship as the defending champions.

On 7 October 1979, Kilruane MacDonaghs won the championship after a 2–18 to 3–06 defeat of Thurles Sarsfields in the final at Semple Stadium. It was their third championship title overall and their third title in succession.

== Results ==
=== Quarter-finals ===
19 August 1979 Quarter-final	Cappawhite	3-11 - 2-12	Carrick Davins	Semple Stadium
	J O'Neill 1-5, Martin McDermott 1-0, M O'Shea 1-0, Micheal McDermott 0-3, A Buckley 0-3.		T Roche 0-6, J Kennedy 1-0, J Moroney 1-0, J Murphy 0-2, J Walsh 0-1, PJ Ryan 0-1, K Cronin 0-1.

19 August 1979 Quarter-final	Seán Treacy's	1-15 - 1-06	Fionn MacCumhaill	Semple Stadium
	D Carey 1-2, PJ Caplis 0-5, J Carey 0-5, T Ryan 0-2, F Berkery 0-1.		M Brennan 1-3, J Molloy 0-1, M McGrath 0-1, D Shelly 0-1.

26 August 1979 Quarter-final	Kilruane MacDonaghs	5-15 - 2-08	Holycross-Ballycahill	MacDonagh Park
	S Hennessy 0-10, S Waters 2-0, S Keogh 1-2, E O'Shea 1-1, S O'Meara 1-0, L O'Shea 0-2.		S Mackey 2-3, M Doyle 0-3, J Doyle 0-1, J Ryan 0-1.

26 August 1979 Quarter-final	Thurles Sarsfields	2-12 - 0-13	Moneygall	MacDonagh Park
	P McCormack 0-7, P Byrne 1-2, T Doyle 1-0, J Dwyer 0-1, M Gleeson 0-1, J Doyle 0-1.		S Ryan 0-7, P Sheedy 0-3, E Sutton 0-2, J Ryan 0-1.

=== Semi-finals ===
9 September 1979 Semi-final	Kilruane MacDonaghs	2-19 - 5-07	Cappawhite	Semple Stadium
	L O'Shea 1-3, S Waters 1-2, S Hennessy 0-5, S O'Meara 0-3, E O'Shea 0-3, Ger Williams 0-2, J Williams 0-1.		Paddy O'Neill 2-1, Martin McDermott 1-3, J O'Neill 1-0, Michael McDermott 1-0, E Ryan 0-1, A Buckley 0-1, Pat O'Neill 0-1.

9 September 1979 Semi-final	Thurles Sarsfields	1-17 - 1-09	Seán Treacys	Semple Stadium
	P McCormack 0-9, P Burns 1-2, J Doyle 0-2, M Maher 0-2, M Dundon 0-1, J Cahill 0-1.		J Carey 0-4, T Ryan 1-0, D Carey 0-2, PJ Caplins 0-2, JJ Ryan 0-1.

=== Final ===
7 October 1979 Final	Kilruane MacDonaghs	2-18 - 3-06	Thurles Sarsfields	Semple Stadium
	S Hennessy 0-8, E O'Shea 1-3, S O'Meara 1-3, S Waters 0-2, Ger Williams 0-1, J Williams 0-1.		J Burke 1-1, P Byrne 1-1, P McCormack 0-4, T Barry 1-0.	Referee: J Moloney

== Championship statistics ==
=== Top scorers ===
Overall

Rank	Player	Club	Tally	Total	Matches	Average
1	Séamus Hennessy	Kilruane MacDonaghs	0-23	23	3	7.66
2	Pat McCormack	Thurles Sarsfields	0-20	20	3	6.66
3	Paul Byrne	Thurles Sarsfields	3-05	14	3	4.66
4	Séamus Waters	Kilruane MacDonaghs	3-04	13	3	4.33
4	Eamon O'Shea	Kilruane MacDonaghs	2-07	13	3	4.33
6	Seán O'Meara	Kilruane MacDonaghs	2-06	12	3	4.00
7	John O'Neill	Cappawhite	2-05	11	2	5.50
8	Séamus Mackey	Holycross-Ballycahill	2-03	9	1	9.00
8	Martin McDermott	Cappawhite	2-03	9	2	4.50
8	John Carey	Seán Treacys	2-03	9	1	9.00

In a single game

Rank	Player	Club	Tally	Total	Opposition
1	Séamus Hennessy	Kilruane MacDonaghs	0-10	10	Holycross-Ballycahill
2	Séamus Mackey	Holycross-Ballycahill	2-03	9	Kilruane MacDonaghs
2	Pat McCormack	Thurles Sarsfields	0-09	9	Seán Treacys
4	John O'Neill	Cappawhite	1-05	8	Carrick Davins
4	Séamus Hennessy	Kilruane MacDonaghs	0-08	8	Thurles Sarsfields
6	Paddy O'Neill	Cappawhite	2-01	7	Kilruane MacDonaghs
6	Pat McCormack	Thurles Sarsfields	0-07	7	Moneygall
6	Séamus Ryan	Moneygall	0-07	7	Thurles Sarsfields
9	Séamus Waters	Kilruane MacDonaghs	2-00	6	Holycross-Ballycahill
9	Martin Brennan	Fionn Mac Cumhaill	1-03	6	Seán Treacys
9	Liam O'Shea	Kilruane MacDonaghs	1-03	6	Cappawhite
9	Martin McDermott	Cappawhite	1-03	6	Kilruane MacDonaghs
9	Eamon O'Shea	Kilruane MacDonaghs	1-03	6	Thurles Sarsfields
9	Seán O'Meara	Kilruane MacDonaghs	1-03	6	Thurles Sarsfields
9	Tommy Roche	Carrick Davins	0-06	6	Cappawhite
