= 1985 Tipperary Senior Hurling Championship =

Annual hurling competition season

- Dates: 8 September - 13 October 1985
- Teams: 8
- Champions: Kilruane MacDonaghs (4th title); Tony Sheppard (captain); Len Gaynor (manager)
- Runners-up: Roscrea; Ger O'Connor (captain)

Tournament statistics
- Matches played: 7
- Goals scored: 28 (4 per match)
- Points scored: 129 (18.43 per match)
- Top scorer(s): Michael Scully (1-17)

The 1985 Tipperary Senior Hurling Championship was the 94th staging of the Tipperary Senior Hurling Championship since its establishment by the Tipperary County Board in 1887.

Moycarkey-Borris were the defending champions.

On 13 October 1985, Kilruane MacDonaghs won the championship after a 2–11 to 0–10 defeat of Roscrea in the final at Semple Stadium. It was their fourth championship title overall and their first title since 1979.

== Results ==
=== Quarter-finals ===
8 September 1985 Quarter-final	Cappawhite	4-08 - 2-12	St. Mary's	Canon Hayes Park
	G O'Neill 3-1, P O'Neill 1-2, G Ryan 0-1, E Ryan 0-1, A Buckley 0-1, D Hennessy 0-1.		W Peters 0-5, D Williams 1-1, T Walsh 1-0, J McNamara 0-2, T Smith 0-2, F Kelly 0-1, J Redmond 0-1.

8 September 1985 Quarter-final	Carrick Swans	3-09 - 0-10	Cashel King Cormacs	Canon Hayes Park
	MJ Russell 1-5, T Fitzpatrick 1-1, B Lonergan 1-1, T Waters 0-1, P Murphy 0-1.		T Gorgan 0-6, S Slattery 0-2, B Fitzelle 0-1, T Slattery 0-1.

15 September 1985 Quarter-final	Kilruane MacDonaghs	2-10 - 2-03	Thurles Sarsfields	Semple Stadium
	S Hennessy 0-6, E O'Shea 0-4, J Williams 1-0, Philip Quinlan 1-0.		P McCormack (g'keeper) 2-0, P McCormack 0-2, K Carroll 0-1.

15 September 1985 Quarter-final	Roscrea	2-11 - 1-10	Holycross-Ballycahill	Semple Stadium
	M Scully 1-5, G O'Connor 1-2, G Ryan 0-2, J Stone 0-1, J Pyne 0-1.		M Fleming 1-2, S Dwan 0-2, T Lanigan 0-2, P Lowry 0-1, PJ Lanigan 0-1, M McGrath 0-1, M Doyle 0-1.

=== Semi-finals ===
29 September 1985 Semi-final	Kilruane MacDonaghs	2-08 - 2-02	Cappawhite	Semple Stadium
	Pat Quinlan 1-2, Philip Quinlan 1-0, Ger Williams 0-2, S Hennessy 0-2, J Williams 0-2.		G O'Neill 1-0, C Ryan 1-0, P O'Neill 0-1 A Buckley 0-1.

29 September 1985 Semi-final	Roscrea	4-17 - 2-08	Carrick Swans	Semple Stadium
	F Loughnane 2-4, M Scully 0-7, E Bergin 1-1, J Stone 1-0, L Spooner 0-2, G O'Connor 0-1, P Queally 0-1, G Ryan 0-1.		MJ Russell 2-4, G Walsh 0-2, P Murphy 0-1, T Waters 0-1.

=== Final ===
13 October 1985 Final	Kilruane MacDonaghs	2-11 - 0-10	Roscrea	Semple Stadium
	E O'Shea 1-4, Pat Quinlan 1-0, P Williams 0-2, S Hennessy 0-2, J Williams 0-2, Ger Williams 0-1.		M Scully 0-5, D Keely 0-1, G Ryan 0-1, L Spooner 0-1, J Stone 0-1, G O'Connor 0-1.	Referee: D O'Gorman (Thurles Sarsfields)

== Championship statistics ==
=== Top scorers ===
Overall

Rank	Player	Club	Tally	Total	Matches	Average
1	Michael Scully	Roscrea	1-17	20	3	6.66
2	M. J. Russell	Carrick Swans	3-09	18	2	9.00
3	Ger O'Neill	Cappawhite	4-01	13	2	6.50
4	Eamon O'Shea	Kilruane MacDonaghs	1-08	11	3	3.66
5	Francis Loughnane	Roscrea	2-04	10	3	3.33
5	Séamus Hennessy	Kilruane MacDonaghs	0-10	10	3	3.33
7	Pat Quinlan	Kilruane MacDonaghs	2-02	8	3	2.66
8	Ger O'Connor	Roscrea	1-04	7	3	2.33
8	Jim Williams	Kilruane MacDonaghs	1-04	7	3	2.33
10	Pat McCormack	Thurles Sarsfields	2-00	6	2	3.00
10	Pat O'Neill	Cappawhite	1-03	6	2	3.00
10	Tommy Grogan	Cashel King Cormacs	0-06	6	1	6.00

In a single game

Rank	Player	Club	Tally	Total	Opposition
1	Ger O'Neill	Cappawhite	3-01	10	St. Mary's
1	Francis Loughnane	Roscrea	2-04	10	Carrick Swans
1	M. J. Russell	Carrick Swans	2-04	10	Roscrea
4	M. J. Russell	Carrick Swans	1-05	8	Cashel King Cormacs
4	Michael Scully	Roscrea	1-05	8	Holycross-Ballycahill
6	Eamon O'Shea	Kilruane MacDonaghs	1-04	7	Roscrea
6	Michael Scully	Roscrea	0-07	7	Kilruane MacDonaghs
8	Pat McCormack	Thurles Sarsfields	2-00	6	Kilruane MacDonaghs
8	Tommy Grogan	Cashel King Cormacs	0-06	6	Carrick Swans
8	Séamus Hennessy	Kilruane MacDonaghs	0-06	6	Thurles Sarsfields
