= 1976 All-Ireland Minor Hurling Championship =

All-Ireland Minor Hurling Championship 1976
All Ireland Champions
- Winners: Tipperary (13th win)
- Captain: Joe Hogan

All Ireland Runners-up
- Runners-up: Kilkenny
- Captain: Eddie Mahon

Provincial Champions
- Munster: Tipperary
- Leinster: Kilkenny
- Ulster: Down
- Connacht: Not Played

The 1976 All-Ireland Minor Hurling Championship was the 46th staging of the All-Ireland Minor Hurling Championship since its establishment by the Gaelic Athletic Association in 1928.

Kilkenny were the defending champions.

The All-Ireland final was played on 5 September 1976 at Croke Park in Dublin, between Tipperary and Kilkenny, in what was their 12th meeting in the final overall and a first meeting in the final in 14 years. Tipperary won the match by 2–20 to 1–07 to claim their 13th championship title overall and a first tile in 17 years.

== Munster Minor Hurling Championship ==
=== Munster first round ===
15 May 1976 First round	Kerry	1-03 - 7-10	Tipperary	Tom Healy Park
	J Sheehan 1-0, S Flaherty 0-2, G Hannafin 0-1.

19 May 1976 First round	Waterford	5-07 - 4-03	Clare	Canon Hayes Park
	D Fitzpatrick 2-1, J O'Regan 1-3, J Cotter 1-0, J Kelly 1-0, S Daly 0-2, K Brophy 0-1.		C Lyons 2-0, J Power 1-0, J Colleran 1-0, T Quilligan 0-1, P Deasy 0-1, M Nugent 0-1.

=== Munster semi-finals ===
28 May 1976 Semi-final	Tipperary	1-13 - 2-08	Cork	Gaelic Grounds
	M Murphy 1-1, P Power 0-3, T Grogan 0-3, J Hogan 0-2, J Stone 0-2, E O'Shea 0-1, M Doyle 0-1.		M Lynch 1-3, D Buckley 1-0, J O'Sullivan 0-3, P Horgan 0-2.

4 July 1976 Semi-final	Limerick	3-20 - 2-03	Waterford	Semple Stadium
	T Dunne 1-12, S Herbert 0-4, O O'Connor 1-0, M Lonergan 1-0, M O'Donnell 0-1, B Carroll 0-1, J Mann 0-1, D Punch 0-1.		M Hannon 1-0, R Fives 1-0, J O'Regan 0-2, T Ryan 0-1.

=== Munster final ===
1 August 1976 Final	Tipperary	5-10 - 5-06	Limerick	Páirc Uí Chaoimh
	T Grogan 1-4, P Looby 2-0, M Murphy 1-2, J Hogan 0-4, J Stone 1-0.		T Dunne 2-2, M Lonergan 1-2, S Óg Herbert 1-0, V O'Connor 1-0, B Ryan 0-1, J Mann 0-1.

== All-Ireland Minor Hurling Championship ==
=== All-Ireland semi-final ===
15 August 1976 Semi-final	Kilkenny	6-17 - 0-06	Galway	Páirc Uí Chaoimh
	J Heffernan 1-6, J Ryan 1-6, J Waters 2-1, J Wall 0-3, P Brennan 1-0, L Fennelly 1-0, J Brennan 0-1.		P Ryan 0-2, B Dolan 0-2, D Connolly 0-1, J Ryan 0-1.

=== All-Ireland final ===
5 September 1976 Final	Tipperary	2-20 - 1-07	Kilkenny	Croke Park
	T Grogan 1-7, E O'Shea 1-1, P Ryan 0-3, M Doyle 0-3, M Murphy 0-2, J Hogan 0-2, G Stapleton 0-1, P Power 0-1.		J ryan 0-4, J Brennan 1-0, G Stapleton 0-1, T Lennon 0-1, S Hennessy 0-1.	Referee: P Cronin (Cork)
