= 1979 All-Ireland Under-21 Hurling Championship =

All-Ireland Under-21 Hurling Championship 1979
Championship Details
- Dates: 11 April 1979 - 23 September 1979

All Ireland Champions
- Winners: Tipperary (3rd win)
- Captain: Michael Doyle

All Ireland Runners-up
- Runners-up: Galway
- Captain: Conor Hayes

Provincial Champions
- Munster: Tipperary
- Leinster: Wexford
- Ulster: Antrim
- Connacht: Not Played

Championship Statistics
- Top Scorer: Michael Nash (3-23)

The 1979 All-Ireland Under-21 Hurling Championship was the 16th staging of the All-Ireland Under-21 Hurling Championship since its establishment by the Gaelic Athletic Association in 1964. The championship began on 11 April 1979 and ended on 23 September 1979.

Galway entered the championship as the defending champions.

On 23 September 1979, Tipperary won the championship following a 2-12 to 1-09 defeat of Galway in the All-Ireland final. This was their third All-Ireland title overall and their first title since 1967.

Kilkenny's Michael Nash was the championship's top scorer with 3-23.

== Results ==
=== Leinster Under-21 Hurling Championship ===
Quarter-finals

6 June 1979 Quarter-final	Laois	0-03 - 2-10	Kilkenny	O'Moore Park, Portlaoise
			M Nash 1-6, J Ryan 1-0, S Fennelly 0-1, L Fennelly 0-1, J Power 0-1, J Wall 0-1.

10 June 1979 Quarter-final	Dublin	1-07 - 0-14	Offaly	Croke Park, Dublin
	J Morris 1-1, D Murphy 0-2, A McSweeney 0-2, B Murphy 0-1, L Broderick 0-1.		P Kirwan 0-8, L Currams 0-3, J Abbott 0-2, J Mooney 0-1.

Semi-finals

7 July 1979 Semi-final	Kilkenny	6-18 - 2-07	Meath	Nowlan Park, Kilkenny
	J Wall 3-1, M Nash 0-6, P Brennan 1-1, J Ryan 1-0, L Fennelly 1-0, J Power 0-3, G Ryan 0-2, S Hennessy 0-2, J Lalor 0-1, E Egan 0-1, J Mulcahy 0-1.		S Garrigan 1-3, J Masterson 1-1, A Doherty 0-1, S Ryan 0-1, J Priest 0-1.	Referee: M Kelleher (Kildare)

18 July 1979 Semi-final	Wexford	2-14 - 2-05	Offaly	O'Moore Park, Portlaoise
	J Sweeney 2-1, B O'Connor 0-7, J Barron 0-3, J Jordan 0-2, G Flood 0-1.		P Kirwan 1-1, J Millon 1-0, J Abbott 0-2, T Kennelly 0-1, J Mooney 0-1.

Final

25 July 1979 Final	Wexford	0-14 - 2-08	Kilkenny	Dr. Cullen Park, Carlow
	B O'Connor 0-7, J Barron 0-3, B Sheehan 0-1, P Doyle 0-1, J Fleming 0-1, J Jordan 0-1.		M Nash 2-4, T Brennan 0-1, P Murphy 0-1, J Mulcahy 0-1, R Murphy 0-1.	Referee: J Rankins (Laois)

12 August 1979 Final replay	Wexford	1-08 - 0-10	Kilkenny	Dr. Cullen Park, Carlow
	B O'Connor 1-6, S O'Leary 0-1, B Sheehan 0-1.		M Nash 0-7, E Deegan 0-1, L Fennelly 0-1, J Power 0-1.	Referee: T Hughes (Carlow)

=== Munster Under-21 Hurling Championship ===
First round

11 April 1979 First round	Tipperary	6-13 - 2-03	Clare	Semple Stadium, Thurles
	M Murphy 3-2, P Looby 2-0, M Doyle 1-1, P Ryan 0-4, T Grogan 0-2, P Power 0-2, C Stapleton 0-2.		M Nugent 1-2, C Lyons 1-0, M Meehan 0-1, C Martin 0-1.

16 April 1979 First round	Kerry	3-06 - 0-10	Waterford	Ardfert
	S Flaherty 1-4, P Stack 1-1, J O'Connell 1-0, P McMahon 0-1.		P Curran 0-5, E Rockett 0-2, B Power 0-1, J Cotter 0-1, C Curley 0-1.

Semi-finals

25 April 1979 Semi-final	Tipperary	1-17 - 1-06	Limerick	Semple Stadium, Thurles
	T Grogan 0-7, P Looby 1-1, M Murphy 0-3, M Doyle 0-3, T Slattery 0-1, P Power 0-1, D O'Connell 0-1.		E Meskill 1-0, M O'Connor 0-2, O O'Connor 0-2, B Carroll 0-1, J Mann 0-1.

25 April 1979 Semi-final	Kerry	0-06 - 1-08	Cork	Ardfert
	P Stack 0-2, J Sheehan 0-2, S Flaherty 0-1, P McMahon 0-1.		S O'Gorman 1-2, J Cremin 0-2, J Buckley 0-1, J Dineen 0-1, T McCarthy 0-1, U Kennefick 0-1.

Final

25 July 1979 Final	Tipperary	1-13 - 2-07	Cork	Semple Stadium, Thurles
	T Grogan 0-8, M Doyle 1-1, T Slattery 0-1, P Looby 0-1, P Power 0-1, E O'Shea 0-1.		M Carroll 1-1, R O'Connor 1-0, J O'Sullivan 0-2, J Buckley 0-1, J Cremin 0-1, P Horgan 0-1, S O'Gorman 0-1.

=== Ulster Under-21 Hurling Championship ===
Final

21 July 1979 Final	Armagh	2-02 - 9-13	Antrim	Athletic Grounds, Armagh
				Referee: B Crawford (Down)

=== All-Ireland Under-21 Hurling Championship ===
Semi-finals

12 August 1979 Semi-final	Tipperary	7-13 - 4-06	Antrim	Semple Stadium, Thurles
	P Power 3-0, T Grogan 1-4, E O'Shea 0-5, J Stone 1-0, P Looby 1-0, G O'Connor 1-0, G Stapleton 0-1, D O'Connell 0-1, T Slattery 0-1, J O'Dwyer 0-1.		D Donnelly 2-4, B Donnelly 1-1, D McKiernan 1-1.

9 September 1979 Semi-final	Galway	1-12 - 2-08	Wexford	Nowlan Park, Kilkenny
	J Coen 0-8, J Ryan 1-2, S Dolan 0-2.		J O'Connor 1-1, E Kehoe 1-0, B O'Connor 0-3, B Sheehan 0-2, J Barron 0-1, S O'Leary 0-1.	Referee: J Woods (Clare)

Final

23 September 1979 Final	Tipperary	2-12 - 1-09	Galway	O'Moore Park, Portlaoise
	M Doyle 1-2, P Looby 1-1, T Grogan 0-3, M Murphy 0-2, E O'Shea 0-2, T Slattery 0-1, B Mannion 0-1.		J Ryan 1-2, J Coen 0-4, P Ryan 0-1, S Davoren 0-1, C Hayes 0-1.	Referee: N Dalton (Waterford)

== Championship statistics ==
=== Top scorers ===
Overall

Rank	Player	County	Tally	Total	Matches	Average
1	Michael Nash	Kilkenny	3-23	32	4	8.00
2	Tommy Grogan	Tipperary	1-24	27	5	5.40
3	Brendan O'Connor	Wexford	1-23	26	4	6.50

=== Miscellaneous ===
- On 16 April 1979, Kerry won their first and, to date, only Munster Championship match when they defeated Waterford by 3-06 to 0-10.
