= 1985–86 All-Ireland Senior Club Hurling Championship =

All-Ireland Senior Club Hurling Championship 1985–86
Championship Details
- Dates: 25 August 1985 – 16 March 1986
- Teams: 33

All Ireland Champions
- Winners: Kilruane MacDonagh's (1st win)
- Captain: Tony Sheppard

All Ireland Runners-up
- Runners-up: Buffer's Alley
- Captain: Seán Whelan

Provincial Champions
- Munster: Kilruane MacDonagh's
- Leinster: Buffer's Alley
- Ulster: Ruairí Óg
- Connacht: Turloughmore

Championship Statistics
- Top Scorer: Mick Butler (2–28)

The 1985–86 All-Ireland Senior Club Hurling Championship was the 16th staging of the All-Ireland Senior Club Hurling Championship, the Gaelic Athletic Association's premier inter-county club hurling tournament. The championship ran from 25 August 1985 to 16 March 1986.

St Martin's of Kilkenny were the defending champions, however, they failed to qualify after being beaten by Glenmore in the semi-final of the 1985 Kilkenny SHC. Kilmaley of Clare made their championship debut.

The All-Ireland final was played at Croke Park in Dublin on 16 March 1986, between Kilruane MacDonagh's of Tipperary and Buffers Alley of Wexford, in what was a first championship meeting between the teams. Kilruane MacDonagh's won the match by 1–15 to 2–10 to claim their only title.

Mick Butler was the championshi's top scorer with 2–28.

== Connacht Senior Club Hurling Championship ==
=== Connacht first round ===
6 October 1985 First round	Tourlestrane	1–05 – 1–02	Gortletteragh	Corran Park
	D McVeigh 1–1, L Gaughan 0–1, M McVeigh 0–1, B Walsh 0–1, G Gaughan 0–1.		T McLoughlin 1–2.

=== Connacht second round ===
13 October 1985 Second round	Tourlestrane	0–06 – 3–10	Tooreen	Corran Park
	J Quinn 0–1, J Walsh 0–1, W Kavanagh 0–1, J Gaughan 0–1.		J Henry 2–4, S Rodgers 1–0, J Cunnane 0–2, T Henry 0–2, M Trench 0–1, P Malone 0–1.

=== Connacht semi-final ===
27 October 1985 Semi-final	Tooreen	1–06 – 2–07	Ballygar	Ballyhaunis Grounds
	J Henry 0–5, S Regan 1–0, J Cunnane 0–1.		PJ Lynch 2–0, T Heavey 1–1, P Flynn 0–3, M Lohan 0–3.

=== Connacht final ===
24 November 1985 Final	Ballygar	2–04 – 1–08	Turloughmore	Athleague Sportsfield
	P Flynn 1–3, PJ Fahy 1–0, P Feeney 0–1.		G Burke 0–5, G Doherty 1–1, M Naughton 0–2.

== Leinster Senior Club Hurling Championship ==
=== Leinster preliminary round ===
29 September 1985 Preliminary round	Naomh Colmcille	3–13 – 7–06	St Kieran's	Páirc Mhuire

=== Leinster first round ===
12 October 1985 First round	Brownstown	0–07 – 1–09	Naomh Eoin	Kinnegad Grounds
			N Minchin 1–0, M Slye 0–3, T Quirke 0–3, J Nolan 0–1, C Kenny 0–1, P Quirke 0–1.

13 October 1985 First round	Arklow Rock Parnells	2–05 – 1–04	Rathmolyon	Pearse Park
	J Kelly 1-3, P Connor 1-0, M Byrne 0-1, M Fortune 0-1.		P Farrell 1-0, D Tuite 0-1, N Hunt 0-1, C Ennis 0-1, P Lawless 0-1.

13 October 1985 First round	St Kieran's	1–04 – 4–09	Ardclough	Rathcline Grounds
	F Jordan 1–0, A Jordan 0–2, M Carroll 0–2.		J Walsh 1–3, N Byrne 1–2, T Johnson 1–1, N Walsh 1–0, M Devanney 0–2, T Christian 0–1.

=== Leinster quarter-finals ===
27 October 1985 Quarter-final	Buffers Alley	4–13 – 1–02	Kilmacud Crokes	Wexford Park
	M Butler 1–4, T Dempsey 2–0, T Doran 1–2, T Dwyer 0–4, M Casey 0–1, M Foley 0–1, S O'Leary 0–1.		F Rutledge 1–0, J Hackett 0–1, N Howard 0–1.

27 October 1985 Quarter-final	Kinnitty	4–20 – 2–11	Ardclough	Naas Grounds
	P Corrigan 2–9, M Corrigan 1–5, T Carroll 1–0, L Carroll 0–3, B Kennedy 0–2, S Donoghue 0–1.		J Walsh 0–7, N Sullivan 1–1, M Deveney 1–0, N Walsh 0–2,	Referee: J Rankins (Laois)

27 October 1985 Quarter-final	Arklow Rock Parnells	2–05 – 1–09	Clonad	Aughrim County Ground
	M Fortune 1–2, M Barnes 1–0, J Reilly 0–2, P Corr 0–1.		M Dolan 1–3, G Lanham 0–3, P Coss 0–1, T Moran 0–1, N Roe 0–1.

27 October 1985 Quarter-final	Ballyhale Shamrocks	w/o – scr.	Naomh Eoin	Dr Cullen Park, Carlow

=== Leinster semi-finals ===
10 November 1985 Semi-final	Kinnitty	1–09 – 0–09	Ballyhale Shamrocks	Dr Cullen Park
	P Corrigan 1–8, P Delaney 0–1.		G Fennelly 0–6, M Fennelly 0–1, L Fennelly 0–1, B Fennelly 0–1.	Referee: N O'Donoghue (Dublin)

10 November 1985 Semi-final	Buffers Alley	5–11 – 0–11	Clonad	Dr Cullen Park
	M Butler 0–7, S O'Leary 2–0, T Doran 1–2, T Dempsey 1–0, S Whelan 1–0, G Sweeney 0–1, T Dwyer 0–1.		M Drennan 0–4, D Sheeran 0–3, J Farrell 0–1, J Killeen 0–1, M Doran 0–1, N Roe 0–1.	Referee: M Kelleher (Kildare)

=== Leinster final ===
24 November 1985 Final	Buffers Alley	3–09 – 0–07	Kinnitty	Nowlan Park
	C Doran 2–1, M Butler 0–6, T Dempsey 1–0, G Sweeney 0–1, T Dwyer 0–1.		P Corrigan 0–4, M Corrigan 0–2, S Donoghue 0–1.	Referee: P Long (Kilkenny)

== Munster Senior Club Hurling Championship ==
=== Munster quarter-finals ===
13 October 1985 Quarter-final	Lixnaw	0–09 – 1–13	Tallow	Hermitage Park
	S Flaherty 0–9		L Moroney 1–1, P Murphy 0–4, P Daly 0–3, M Beecher 0–2, M Curley 0–1, J McDonnell 0–1, J Kelly 0–1.	Referee: K Walsh (Limerick)

13 October 1985 Quarter-final	Kilmaley	0–10 – 1–17	Blackrock	Cusack Park
	G Kennedy 0–3, S Fitzpatrick 0–2, M Murphy 0–1, G Pyne 0–1, J Mungovan 0–1, M Killeen 0–1, J Griffey 0–1.		F Collins 1–3, F Delaney 0–5, P Kavanagh 0–2, P Deasy 0–2, É O'Donoghue 0–2, T Cashman 0–1, J Cashman 0–1, P Moylan 0–1.	Referee: J Moloney (Tipperary)

=== Munster semi-finals ===
27 October 1985 Semi-final	Tallow	1–17 – 1–18	Kilruane MacDonaghs	Tallow Grounds
	P Curley 1–2, C Curley 0–4, M Beecher 0–4, P Murphy 0–3, P Daly 0–2, M Curley 0–1, J McDonnell 0–1.		Jim Williams 1–4, P Williams 0–3, D Cahill 0–3, É O'Shea 0–2, P Quinlan 0–2, S Hennessy 0–2, Jerry Williams 0–1, G Williams 0–1.	Referee: W Horgan (Cork)

27 October 1985 Semi-final	Blackrock	2–21 – 4–10	Kilmallock	Páirc Uí Chaoimh
	F Delaney 2–8, F Collins 0–3, P Moylan 0–3, T Cashman 0–3, P Deasy 0–1, M Kilcoyne 0–1, É O'Donoghue 0–1, P Kavanagh 0–1.		J Neenan 3–2, P Kelly 1–2, L Tobin 0–2, M Carroll 0–1, B Guiney 0–1, B Savage 0–1, G O'Brien 0–1.	Referee: J Moore (Waterford)

=== Munster finals ===
24 November 1985 Final	Kilruane MacDonaghs	1–08 – 1–08	Blackrock	Gaelic Grounds
	É O'Shea 1–1, S Hennessy 0–4, Jerry Williams 0–1, P Williams 0–1, D Cahill 0–1.		F Delaney 1–1, F Collins 0–3, T Deasy 0–1, M Kilcoyne 0–1, É O'Donoghue 0–1, P Moylan 0–1.	Referee: T Murray (Limerick)

=== Munster final replay ===
1 December 1985 Final replay	Kilruane MacDonaghs	0–12 – 0–06	Blackrock	Gaelic Grounds
	P Williams 0–3, Jerry Williams 0–2, P Quinlan 0–2, Jim Williams 0–2, É O'Shea 0–1, E Hogan 0–1, S Hennessy 0–1.		P Moylan 0–2, F Delaney 0–2, F Collins 0–1, É O'Donoghue 0–1.	Referee: T Murray (Limerick)

== Ulster Senior Club Hurling Championship ==
=== Ulster first round ===
25 August 1985 First round	Lisbellaw St Patricks	4–12 – 4–06	Setanta	Brewster Park
	S Breslin 1-6, K Corrigan 1-2.

25 August 1985 First round	Cavan Gaels	3–07 – 1–11	Middletown	Breffni Park

30 August 1985 First round	Eire Óg Carrickmore	2–06 – 1–04 (abandoned)	Clontibret O'Neills	Eire Óg Grounds

=== Ulster second round ===
8 September 1985 Second round	Lisbellaw St Patricks	1–03 – 7–11	Lavey	Donagh Grounds

15 September 1985 Second round	Clontibret O'Neills	3–07 – 2–10	Cavan Gaels	Páirc Uí Néill

22 September 1985 Second round replay	Cavan Gaels	1–05 – 1–08	Clontibret O'Neills	Breffni Park

=== Ulster semi-finals ===
29 September 1985 Semi-final	Clontibret O'Neills	0–07 – 8–16	Ruairí Óg, Cushendall	Páirc Uí Néill
	W Connolly 0-3, M O'Dowd 0-2, C Brennan 0-1, A Morgan 0-1.		B McGaughey 4-1, L McAllister 2-2, A McGuile 2-0, M Delargy 0-4, F McAllister 0-3, D McNaughton 0-2, J McNaughton 0-2, A McNaughton 0-2.

Semi-final	Ballycran	w/o – scr.	Lavey

=== Ulster final ===
13 October 1985 Final	Ruairí Óg, Cushendall	0–19 – 0–10	Ballycran	Páirc Mhuire
	D McNaughton 0–12, B McGaughey 0–2, B McNaughton 0–2, M Delargy 0–1, A McGuile 0–1, I McNaughton 0–1.		D O'Prey 0–6, M Blaney 0–3, D Hughes 0–1.

== All-Ireland Senior Club Hurling Championship ==
=== All-Ireland quarter-final ===
19 January 1986 Quarter-final	Kilruane MacDonaghs	2–09 – 0–04	Desmonds	MacDonagh Park
	E O'Shea 1–2, Jim Williams 1–2, P Williams 0–3, Jerry Williams 0–2.		M Burke 0–4.	Referee: P Delaney (Laois)

=== All-Ireland semi-finals ===
2 February 1986 Semi-final	Kilruane MacDonaghs	3–09 – 0–09	Turloughmore	MacDonagh Park
	P Williams 1–4, Jim Williams 1–1, S Williams 1–0, Jerry Williams 0–2, E O'Shea 0–2.		G Bourke 0–9.	Referee: P Long (Kilkenny)

2 February 1986 Semi-final	Ruairí Óg, Cushendall	0–05 – 1–10	Buffers Alley	Páirc Mhuire
	D McNaughton 0–3, B McNaughton 0–1, N Delargy 0–1.		M Butler 0–5, S O'Leary 1–1, T Doran 0–1, G Sweeney 0–1, T Dwyer 0–1, M Casey 0–1.	Referee: J Bailey (Dublin)

=== All-Ireland final ===
16 March 1986 Final	Kilruane MacDonaghs	1–15 – 2–10	Buffers Alley	Croke Park
	P Quinlan 1–2, Jim Williams 0–5, G Williams 0–3, P Williams 0–2, P Quinlan 0–2, Jerry Williams 0–1.		M Butler 1–6, T Doran 1–0, S O'Leary 0–2, T Dempsey 0–1, G Sweeney 0–1.	Referee: T Murray (Limerick)

== Championship statistics ==
=== Top scorers ===
Rank	Player	Club	Tally	Total	Matches	Average
1	Mick Butler	Buffers Alley	2–28	34	5	6.80
2	Paddy Corrigan	Kinnitty	3–21	30	3	10.00
3	Finbarr Delaney	Blackrock	3–16	25	4	6.25
4	Jim Williams	Kilruane MacDonaghw	3–14	23	6	3.83
5	Tony Doran	Buffers Alley	5–06	21	5	4.20

=== Miscellaneous ===
- The Ulster Championship first round game between Eire Óg Carrickmore and Clontibret O'Neills was abandoned by the referee with nine minutes remaining due to fading light.
