= Kilruane MacDonagh's GAA =

Gaelic sports club in County Tipperary, Ireland

Kilruane MacDonaghs
- Cill Ruain Mhic Dhonnchadhaí
- Founded: 1937
- County: Tipperary
- Colours: White and Black
- Grounds: MacDonagh Park, Cloughjordan
- Coordinates: 52°56′30.49″N 8°02′31.42″W

Playing kits
Standard colours

Senior Club Championships
	All Ireland	Munster champions	Tipperary champions
Football:	-	-	1
Hurling:	1	1	6

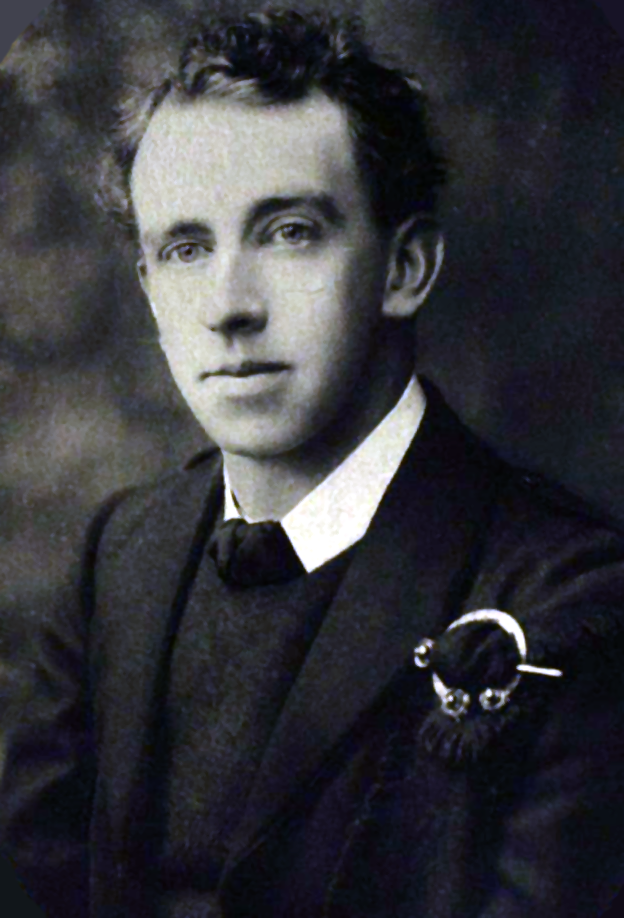
Picture of Thomas MacDonagh (an Irish political activist, poet, playwright, educationalist and 1916 leader)

Kilruane MacDonaghs GAA is a Tipperary GAA club which is located in County Tipperary, Ireland. Both hurling and Gaelic football are played in the North-Tipperary divisional competitions. The club is centred on the villages of Kilruane, Ardcroney and Cloughjordan. The club was founded in 1937 and is named after Thomas MacDonagh, a signatory of the 1916 Proclamation who was born and lived in Cloughjordan. The clubhouse and playing field are located in Cloughjordan.

The finest day in the club's history was in 1986 when it won the Senior Hurling Club All-Ireland title, defeating Buffers Alley of Wexford GAA in the final by 1-15 to 2-10.

The club incorporates many of clubs that existed in the parishes at the time. A forerunner to the MacDonaghs club was the famous De Wets formed in 1900.

On 30 October 2022, Kilruane MacDonaghs defeated Kiladangan 2-20 to 1-16 in the 2022 Tipperary Senior Hurling Championship final after a replay to win their first title since 1985.

== Honours ==
- All-Ireland Senior Club Hurling Championship: 1
  - 1986
- Munster Senior Club Hurling Championship: 1
  - 1985
- Tipperary Senior Club Hurling Championship: (6)
  - 1902 (De Wets), 1977, 1978, 1979, 1985, 2022
- Tipperary Senior Club Football Championship: 1
  - 1975
- North Tipperary Senior Hurling Championship: 19
  - 1901, 1902, 1903, 1904, 1906, 1907, 1908 (De Wets), 1940, 1944, 1959, 1965, 1977, 1978, 1979, 1985, 1986, 1987, 1990, 2018
- North Tipperary Senior Football Championship 6
  - 1972, 1976, 1977, 1978, 1979, 1981
- Tipperary Intermediate Hurling Championship 2
  - 1978, 2003
- Munster Intermediate Club Hurling Championship Runners-up
  - 2003
- North Tipperary Intermediate Hurling Championship 1
  - 1978
- Tipperary Junior A Hurling Championship 2
  - 1960,1985
- North Tipperary Junior A Hurling Championship 10
  - 1913 (De Wets), 1950, 1954, 1956, 1960, 1964, 1975, 1985, 1995, 1998
- Tipperary Junior B Football Championship 1
  - 2022
- Tipperary Junior B Hurling Championship 1
  - 2004
- North Tipperary Junior B Hurling League 1
  - 2004
- North Tipperary Junior B Football Championship 1
  - 2022
- Tipperary Under-21 A Football Championship 1
  - 1978
- North Tipperary Under-21 A Football Championship 6
- 1970, 1973, 1974, 1975, 1976, 1978
- North Tipperary Under-21 B Football Championship 3
  - 1997, 1998, 2004
- North Tipperary Under-21 C Football Championship 1
  - 2002
- Tipperary Under-21 A Hurling Championship 7
  - 1973, 1974, 1975, 1976, 2006, 2007, 2010
- North Tipperary Under-21 A Hurling Championship 12
  - 1972, 1973, 1974, 1975, 1976, 1978, 2006, 2007, 2009, 2010, 2012, 2013
- Tipperary Under-21 B Hurling Championship 1
  - 1993
- North Tipperary Under-21 B Hurling Championship 1
  - 1993
- Tipperary Under-21 C Hurling Championship 1
  - 2002
- North Tipperary Under-21 C Hurling Championship 1
  - 2002
- Tipperary Minor B Football Championship 1
  - 2017
- North Tipperary Minor A Football Championship 4
  - 1970, 1972, 1984, 2024
- North Tipperary Minor B Football Championship 2
  - 2008, 2017
- Tipperary Minor A Hurling Championship 2
  - 1972, 2005
- North Tipperary Minor A Hurling Championship 8
  - 1952, 1964, 1971, 1972, 1973, 2004, 2005, 2006
- North Tipperary Minor B Hurling Championship 2
  - 1975, 2018

== Notable players ==
- Dinny Cahill
- Len Gaynor
- Brian Gaynor, Tipperary hurler 1994-97
- Seamus Gibson
- Séamus Hennessy
- Tom Moloughney, Tipperary hurler 1960-63, All Ireland winner 1961 and 1962
- Mark O'Leary
- Brian O'Meara
- Niall O'Meara
- Éamonn O'Shea
- Craig Morgan
