= Brendan Cummins (GAA player) =

Irish hurler and Gaelic football player

Personal information
- Nickname: cummins
- Born: 11 May 1975 (age 51) Ardfinnan, County Tipperary, Ireland
- Occupation: AIB Bank official
- Height: 6 ft 2 in (188 cm)

Sport
- Football Position: Half-forward
- Hurling Position: Goalkeeper
Clubs
- Years: Club
- Ballybacon–Grange (Hurling); Ardfinnan (Gaelic Football)
Club titles
- Munster titles: 1 (runner-up)
	Football	Hurling
Tipperary titles	0	1
Inter-county*
Years	County	Apps (scores)
1995-2013 1993-2002	Tipperary (hurling); Tipperary (football)	73 (0-01); 16
Inter-county titles
	Football	Hurling
Munster Titles	0	5
All-Ireland Titles	0	2
League titles	0	3
All-Stars	0	5
- *Inter County team apps and scores correct as of 14:39, 19 October 2013.

Brendan Cummins (born 11 May 1975) is an Irish hurler and hurling coach who played as a goalkeeper for the Tipperary senior team.

Born in Ardfinnan, County Tipperary, Cummins arrived on the inter-county scene at the age of seventeen when he first linked up with the Tipperary minor football team, before later joining the minor hurling team and the under-21 sides in both codes. He made his senior hurling debut in the 1993-94 National Hurling League. Cummins went on to play a key role as goalkeeper for twenty years, and won two All-Ireland medals, five Munster medals and three National Hurling League medals. He was an All-Ireland runner-up on three occasions.

Cummins represented the Munster inter-provincial team at various times throughout his career, winning two Railway Cup medals in 2000 and as captain in 2001. At club level, he plays hurling with Ballybacon–Grange and football with sister club Ardfinnan.

Throughout his hurling career Cummins made at the time a record 73 championship appearances for Tipperary. He announced his retirement from inter-county hurling on 17 October 2013.

His father, John Cummins, enjoyed a lengthy career as a Gaelic footballer and as a coach at various levels with Tipperary.

Cummins is widely regarded as one of the greatest goalkeepers in the history of the game. He has been repeatedly voted onto teams made up of the sport's greats, and collected five All-Star awards during his career.

In March 2015, Cummins was featured on the TG4 documentary series Laochra Gael.

Cummins released his autobiography called Standing My Ground in October 2015.

== Biography ==
Brendan Cummins was born in Ardfinnan, County Tipperary in 1975. He was born into a family that had a strong association with Gaelic games, particularly Gaelic football. His father, John Cummins, played football with Tipperary in the 1960s and also featured on the Munster inter-provincial team.

Cummins was educated at the local national school in the village, before later receiving his secondary schooling in nearby Cahir. He currently works as a bank official with the Allied Irish Bank and is based in Cahir.

== Playing career ==
=== Club ===
Cummins plays his club hurling with Ballybacon–Grange and Gaelic football with sister club Ardfinnan.

In 1998, Cummins was goalkeeper on the Ballybacon–Grange team that captured the South Tipperary intermediate championship. It was the first of four divisional titles in-a-row for Cummins and his club.

After failing to secure a fifth successive divisional championship, Ballybacon–Grange returned in 2003 to claim the South Tipp title once again. It was the first of two-in-a-row for Cummins and his team.

Cummins won a seventh South Tipp intermediate championship medal in 2007.

After an absence of five years Ballybacon–Grange were back in the divisional decider once again in 2012. Cummins registered 1–1 in that game to give Ballybacon a 1–13 to 0–11 victory over St. Mary's. It was an eighth divisional medal for Cummins.

=== Minor and under-21 ===
Cummins first came to prominence on the inter-county scene as a dual player in the respective minor grades.

He won a Munster medal as goalkeeper with the Tipperary minor hurling team in 1993 following a 1–12 to 1–9 defeat of Cork. Tipperary were subsequently defeated by Galway in the All-Ireland semi-final.

Two years later in 1995 Cummins had joined the Tipp under-21 team. That year he won a Munster medal in that grade following a 1–17 to 0–14 defeat of Clare. Tipp later reached the All-Ireland decider where Kilkenny, the reigning champions, were the opponents. A 1–14 to 1–10 victory gave Tipp the title and gave Cummins his first All-Ireland medal in any grade.

=== Senior ===
Cummins became a dual player at senior level in 1993. He made his debut with the Tipperary hurlers in a one-point National Hurling League victory over Waterford on 14 November 1993. His first silverware in the top flight came in April 1994, when the Tipperary senior football team won the delayed final of the McGrath Cup.

The retirement of Ken Hogan as first-choice goalkeeper on the Tipp senior hurling team in 1993 meant that the door was now open for a new player to join the starting fifteen. Cummins, who was just out of the minor grade, was overlooked as the position of custodian for the 1994 championship went to Jody Grace.

Cummins made his championship debut in Tipperary's opening championship game in 1995.

In 1997, Tipperary were narrowly defeated by Clare in the provincial decider. Clare subsequently qualified for the All-Ireland decider, however, due to the introduction of the "back-door" system Tipperary provided the opposition in the first all-Munster All-Ireland final. The game itself was one of the best of the decade. Clare were well on top for much of the game, however, Liam Cahill and Eugene O'Neill scored twice for Tipp in the last ten minutes. John Leahy missed a goal chance in the last minute while another Tipp point was controversially ruled wide. At the full-time whistle Clare won by a single point – 0–20 to 2–13.

In early 1999, Tipperary seemed to put down a benchmark for the championship when the team reached the final of the National League. In a repeat of the 1996 decider, Galway were the opposition. This time the result was reversed with Tipperary taking a 1–14 to 1–10 victory. It was Cummins's first National Hurling League medal.

In spite of a lack of championship success, Cummins was recognised as the top goalkeeper of the year in 2000 and duly collected his first All-Star award.

In 2001, Cummins lined out in a third successive National League final. Clare were the opponents in that game, however, the great Clare team of the 1990s was now heading over-the-hill. Tipperary were the victors by 1–19 to 0–17, giving Cummins a second National League medal inside three years. Tipp later qualified for a Munster final meeting with Limerick. A 2–16 to 1–17 victory gave Cummins his first Munster medal. The subsequent All-Ireland final pitted Tipperary against old rivals Galway. Mark O'Leary scored two goals to give Tipperary a reasonably comfortable cushion, just enough to withstand a Galway comeback. Fergal Healy hit the post twice, however, his goal, Galway's second, cut the deficit to one point with just nine minutes left in the game. Tipp outscored Galway during that period to secure a 2–18 to 2–15 victory. It was Cummins's first All-Ireland medal and Tipp's first championship in a decade. He was later honoured by claiming a second All-Star award as goalkeeper.

Tipperary hurling went into decline following this win, however, Cummins won a third All-Star award in 2003.

After losing back-to-back Munster finals to Cork in 2005 and 2006, worse was to follow for Cummins in 2007. Following Tipp's drawn game with Limerick in the opening round of the championship, Cummins was sensationally dropped by manager Babs Keating in favour of his understudy Gerry Kennedy. Cummins remained sidelined for all subsequent games, and saw Tipp exit the championship with a defeat by Wexford in the All-Ireland quarter-final. Speaking in 2013 about being dropped in 2007, Cummins said "2007 was certainly a challenge but I’d always preached that the team was the most important thing, now it was my turn to practise what I was preaching, my main focus was Gerry Kennedy — he was a young fella caught in the middle of a storm. I wanted Tipp to beat Limerick and what I’d normally do with a young fella is make sure he was ready for the game, for the rest of the year, I just trained harder. Then I got a lucky break in a lot of ways when Liam Sheedy came in and offered me a second chance."

Cummins was reinstated as first-choice goalkeeper under new manager Liam Sheedy in 2008. Tipperary announced their return to the big time in 2008 by remaining undefeated in the National League before meeting Galway in the final. In an exciting game Tipp emerged victorious by 3–18 to 3-16 and Cummins collected his third National League medal on the field of play. Tipperary later qualified for the Munster final where they defeated a resurgent Clare team by 2–21 to 0–19. Cummins collected his second Munster medal that day, however, Tipperary were subsequently defeated in a tense All-Ireland semi-final by Waterford on a scoreline of 1–20 to 1–18. Cummins was once again presented with an All-Star award.

In 2009, Cummins won his third Munster medal as Tipp defeated Waterford by 4–14 to 2–16. After a six-week lay-off and a facile semi-final win over Limerick, Tipperary qualified for an All-Ireland final meeting with Kilkenny. For much of the match it looked as if Tipp would pull off a shock and deny 'the Cats' a record-equaling four-in-a-row. Two quick goals in the space of a minute, one from a penalty by Henry Shefflin, sealed a 2–22 to 0–23 victory and defeat for Tipperary.

After surrendering their Munster title to Cork, Tipperary regrouped in the qualifiers and reached a second successive All-Ireland decider. Kilkenny, a team chasing a fifth successive championship, provided the opposition and a great game was expected. Tipperary got off to a great start which was bolstered by an early Lar Corbett goal. He subsequently completed a hat-trick of goals and Tipperary had a fourth by Noel McGrath to deny Kilkenny's drive-for-five and secure a remarkable and convincing 4–17 to 1–18 victory. It was Cummins's second All-Ireland medal. He finished off the season with a fifth All-Star award.

Tipperary returned as provincial kingpins once again in 2011. A 7–19 to 0-19 trouncing of Waterford in the southern decider gave Cummins a fourth Munster medal. For the third successive year, Tipperary faced off against Kilkenny in the All-Ireland final, however, on this occasion Kilkenny were slight underdogs going up against the new champions. Kilkenny started quickly and never surrendered the lead in the 2–17 to 1–16 victory.

In spite of an indifferent National League campaign, Tipperary were regarded as potential All-Ireland champions once again. A 2–17 to 0–16 defeat of Waterford in the provincial decider gave Cummins a fifth Munster medal. Tipperary later faced a humiliating 4–24 to 1–15 defeat by eventual champions Kilkenny in the All-Ireland semi-final.

In 2013, Cummins started his 19th competitive season in the Tipperary goalkeeper's jersey under new manager Eamon O'Shea.

On 17 October 2013, Cummins announced his retirement from inter-county hurling. He admitted that it was time to move on and spend more time with his family and that the 2013 would be his final year. His final game was against Kilkenny at Nowlan Park on 6 July 2013 in phase 2 of the All-Ireland Qualifiers, a game which Tipperary lost by 1–14 to 0-20. Speaking about the game he said "It was probably the most emotional I'd been after a game, when the full-time whistle blew that day, I fell to my knees, I’d like to say thanks for the support from my family, the support from Tipperary fans and from the club." He kept 22 clean sheets during his championship career of 73 matches.

=== Inter-provincial ===
Cummins has also lined out regularly with Munster in the inter-provincial hurling championship. He first played for his province in 1996 as Munster trounced Ulster by 5–13 to 0–7 in the semi-final. Cummins was replaced by Davy FitzGerald for the final which Munster won.

Cummins was the first-choice goalkeeper for Munster between 1999 and 2004, a period which saw some success on the inter-provincial front. Munster reached the final of the competition in 2000. Arch-rivals Leinster provided the opposition and a close game developed between the provinces finest. Munster just about sneaked a 3–15 to 2–15 win, giving Cummins a Railway Cup winners’ medal.

In 2001, Cummins was honoured by being appointed captain of his province for the series of games. After a defeat of Leinster he led his team out for the final against Connacht. Munster had a rather flattering 1–21 to 1–15 victory, however, Cummins had the distinction of lifting the Railway Cup on behalf of his province while also collecting a second consecutive winners’ medal.

In total, Cummins was part of the Munster hurling panel in the Inter-Provincial competition in 1996, 1999, 2000, 2001, 2002, 2003, 2004, 2008, 2009, and 2013 winning 4 medals in 1996, 2000, 2001 (as captain), and in 2013.

=== Poc Fada ===
Cummins has also enjoyed success in the famous Poc Fada competition held annually in the Cooley Mountains. After winning the pairs competition with Ian Scallan from Wexford in 1999, Cummins later went on to win nine singles titles between 2004 and 2015.

== Coaching career ==
In January 2014, Cummins was unveiled as the new goalkeeping coach for the Kerry hurling team, working under Tipperary native Eamonn Kelly . However, for Kerry's 2020 Joe McDonagh Cup Semi-Final match against Carlow, Cummins failed to show up, opting instead to commentate on the Senior Hurling Quarter-Final between his native Tipperary, and Galway, in which Tipperary were beaten.

On 8 September 2021, Cummins was announced as the new manager of the Tipperary under-20 hurling team on a three-year term.

On 31 May 2025, Tipperary won the 2025 All-Ireland Under-20 Hurling Championship after a 3-19 to 1-16 win against Kilkenny in the final.

== Media career ==
Cummins has been a guest panelist on various GAA programmes during his playing career. In May 2014, it was announced that Cummins would join RTÉ's team of GAA analysts on radio and television, starting with the 2014 championships.

He has also written articles for the official GAA website in 2014, the Irish Independent and other sports websites.

== Honours ==
=== Player ===
Ballybacon-Grange

- South Tipperary Intermediate Hurling Championship (11): 1998, 1999, 2000, 2001, 2003, 2004, 2007, 2012, 2013, 2018, 2019
- South Tipperary Junior 'A' Hurling Championship (2): 2016, 2017
- Tipperary Junior 'A' Hurling Championship (1): 2017

Tipperary

- All-Ireland Senior Hurling Championship (2): 2001, 2010
- Munster Senior Hurling Championship (5): 2001, 2008, 2009, 2011, 2012
- National Hurling League (4): 1994, 1999, 2001, 2008
- McGrath Cup (1): 1993
- All-Ireland Senior B Football Championship (1): 1995
- All-Ireland Under-21 Hurling Championship (1): 1995
- Munster Under-21 Hurling Championship (1): 1995
- Munster Minor Hurling Championship (1): 1993
- Waterford Crystal Cup (3): 2007, 2008, 2012

Munster

- Railway Cup (4): 1996, 2000, 2001, 2013

=== Individual ===
- All-Stars (5): 2000, 2001, 2003, 2008, 2010
- Poc Fada (9): 2004, 2006, 2007, 2008, 2011, 2012, 2013, 2014, 2015
- In May 2020, a public poll conducted by RTÉ.ie named Cummins as goalkeeper in a team of hurlers who had won All Stars during the era of The Sunday Game.

=== Manager ===
Tipperary

- All-Ireland Under-20 Hurling Championship (1): 2025
- Munster Under-20 Hurling Championship (2): 2024, 2025

Sporting positions
Preceded by Fergal Ryan (Munster)	Interprovincial Hurling Final winning captain 2001	Succeeded by Andy Comerford (Leinster)
