= Michael Cronin =

Michael or Mick Cronin may refer to:

== Sports ==
- Mick Cronin (hurler) (1902–1982), Irish hurler
- Mick Cronin (footballer) (1911–1979), Australian rules football player, umpire and television commentator
- Mick Cronin (rugby league) (born 1951), Australian rugby league footballer
- Michael Cronin (cricketer) (born 1961), English cricketer
- Mick Cronin (basketball) (born 1971), American basketball coach

== Other people ==
- Michael Cronin (actor) (born 1942), English actor and author
- Michael Cronin (academic) (born 1960), Irish author and academic

== See also ==
- Mikal Cronin (born 1985), American musician
- Mikal Cronin (album)
