= Noel Lane =

Noel Lane may refer to:

- Noel Lane (Galway hurler) (born 1954), Irish hurler, later a manager
- Noel Lane (Tipperary hurler) (born 1943), Irish hurler
- Noel Lane, British police officer killed in the Harrods bombing
