= Rory Garrett =

Irish hurler

Personal information
- Native name: Ruairí Ó Gairbhith (Irish)
- Born: 2006 (age 19–20) Johnstown, County Kilkenny, Ireland

Sport
- Sport: Hurling
- Position: Right wing-back
Club
- Years: Club
- 2024-present: Fenians
Club titles
- Kilkenny titles: 0
Inter-county*
Years	County	Apps (scores)
2026-	Kilkenny	0 (0-00)
Inter-county titles
- Leinster titles: 0
- All-Irelands: 0
- NHL: 0
- All Stars: 0
- *Inter County team apps and scores correct as of 21:48, 23 April 2026.

Rory Garrett (born 2006) is an Irish hurler. At club level he plays with Fenians and at inter-county level with the Kilkenny senior hurling team.

== Career ==
Garrett attended Coláiste Mhuire in Johnstown and played in all grades of hurling during his time there. At club level, he first played for Fenians at juvenile and underage levels before progressing to adult level.

At inter-county level, Garrett first appeared for Kilkenny as a member of the minor team in 2023. He immediately progressed to the under-20 team and lined out with them in the 3–19 to 1–16 defeat by Tipperary in the 2025 All-Ireland U20HC final. Garertt made his senior team debut in a National Hurling League game against Offaly in January 2026.

== Honours ==
Kilkenny

- Leinster Under-20 Hurling Championship: 2025
