= 2023 Tipperary Premier Intermediate Hurling Championship =

- Dates: 26 July – 21 October 2023
- Teams: 16
- Sponsor: FBD Insurance
- Champions: Lorrha (1st title); Michael Dolan (captain); Ken Hogan (manager)
- Runners-up: Thurles Sarsfields; Mossie McCormack (captain)
- Relegated: Portroe

The 2023 Tipperary Premier Intermediate Hurling Championship was the seventh staging of the Tipperary Premier Intermediate Hurling Championship since its establishment by the Tipperary County Board in 2017 and subsequent rebranding in 2022. The draws for the group stage pairings took place on 3 April 2023. The championship ran from 26 July to 21 October 2023.

The final, a replay, was played on 21 October 2023 at MacDonagh Park in Nenagh, between Lorrha and Thurles Sarsfields, in what was their first ever meeting in the final. Lorrha won the match by 2-13 to 0-18 to claim their first ever championship title.

== Team changes ==
=== To Championship ===
Relegated from the Tipperary Senior Hurling Championship

- Éire Óg Annacarty

Promoted from the Tipperary Intermediate Hurling Championship

- Lorrha

=== From Championship ===
Promoted to the Tipperary Senior Hurling Championship

- Roscrea

Relegated to the Tipperary Intermediate Hurling Championship

- Kiladangan

== Knockout stage ==
=== Semi-finals ===
1 October 2023 Semi-final	Thurles Sarsfields	2-21 - 3-13	Killenaule	Boherlahen Grounds
		Report

8 October 2023 Semi-final	Lorrha	3-19 - 1-17	Cashel King Cormacs	St Michael's Park

=== Final ===
14 October 2023 Final	Lorrha	2-15 - 1-18	Thurles Sarsfields	MacDonagh Park
	C Fogarty 2-0; C Fogarty (0-4, 0-3f); D Guinan 0-3; C Hogan 0-3; P Maher 0-2; N McIntyre 0-1, M Dolan 0-1 65; A O’Meara 0-1 sl-cut.	Report Report]	J Lanigan 0-11f; M O’Brien 1-2; L McCormack 0-1, M McCormack 0-1, R Stapleton 0-1, A Ryan 0-1, K Moloney 0-1.

=== Final replay ===
21 October 2023 Final replay	Lorrha	2-13 - 0-18	Thurles Sarsfields	MacDonagh Park
