= Liam King (hurler) =

Irish hurler (1940–2026)

Personal information
- Native name: Liam Ó Cionga (Irish)
- Born: 1942 Lorrha, County Tipperary, Ireland
- Died: 31 August 2026 (aged 84) Galway, Ireland
- Height: 5 ft 11 in (180 cm)

Sport
- Sport: Hurling
- Position: Right corner-back
Club
- Years: Club
- 1956–1979: Lorrha–Dorrha
Club titles
- Tipperary titles: 0
Inter-county
Years	County	Apps (scores)
1969–1975	Tipperary	10 (0–00)
Inter-county titles
- Munster titles: 1
- All-Irelands: 1
- NHL: 0
- All Stars: 0

Liam King (1942 – 31 August 2026) was an Irish hurler. At club level he played with Lorrha–Dorrha and at inter-county level with the Tipperary senior hurling team.

== Career ==
Born and raised in Lorrha, County Tipperary, his father, Joe King, won an All-Ireland JHC medal with Offaly in 1929. King first played hurling at juvenile levels with the Lorrha–Dorrha club. He won consecutive North Tipperary U15HC titles in 1956 and 1957, before winning a Tipperary U15HC title in the latter year. King won a North Tipperary SHC medal in 1966, following a 3–11 to 2–13 win over Toomevara.

King never played in organised competitions at schools' and colleges' levels and never played for Tipperary in the minor, junior or intermediate grades. He made his senior team debut in a game against New York in October 1969 and won a Munster SHC medal in 1971, after coming on as a substitute in the one-point win over Limerick. An injury to clubmate Noel Lane resulted in King lining out at corner-back in the 5–17 to 5–14 defeat of Kilkenny in the 1971 All-Ireland SHC final.

== Death ==
King died on 31 August 2026, at the age of 84.

== Honours ==
Lorrha

- North Tipperary Senior Hurling Championship (1): 1966
- Tipperary Under-15 Hurling Championship (1): 1957
- North Tipperary Under-15 Hurling Championship (2): 1956, 1957

Tipperary

- All-Ireland Senior Hurling Championship (1): 1971
- Munster Senior Hurling Championship (1): 1971
