= Christy Forde =

Irish hurler

Personal information
- Native name: Criostóir Mac Giollarnáth (Irish)
- Born: 21 December 1903 Lorrha, County Tipperary, Ireland
- Died: 20 November 1959 (aged 55) St. Kevin's Hospital, Dublin, Ireland
- Occupation: Army officer

Sport
- Sport: Hurling
- Position: Goalkeeper
Club
- Years: Club
- Lorrha–Dorrha
Inter-county
- Years: County
- 1933-1940 1937: Dublin; Tipperary
Inter-county titles
- Leinster titles: 2
- All-Irelands: 1
- NHL: 1

Christopher "Christy" Forde (21 December 1903 – 20 November 1959) was an Irish hurler who played as a goalkeeper for the Dublin and Tipperary senior teams.

Forde made his first appearance for the Dublin team during the 1933 championship and was a regular member of the starting fifteen until his retirement after the 1940 championship. During that time he won one All-Ireland medal, two Leinster medals and one National Hurling League medal.

At club level Forde began his career with Lorrha–Dorrha before later playing club hurling in Dublin.
