= Ivan Bolger =

Irish hurler

Personal information
- Native name: Seán Ó Bolguidhir (Irish)
- Born: 2005 (age 20–21) Graignamanagh, County Kilkenny, Ireland
- Occupation: Student

Sport
- Sport: Hurling
- Position: Right corner-back
Club
- Years: Club
- 2023-present: Graignamanagh
Club titles
- Kilkenny titles: 0
College
- Years: College
- 2023-present: DCU Dóchas Éireann
College titles
- Fitzgibbon titles: 0
Inter-county
Years	County	Apps (scores)
2026-	Kilkenny	0 (0-00)
Inter-county titles
- Leinster titles: 0
- All-Irelands: 0
- NHL: 0
- All Stars: 0

Ivan Bolger (born 2005) is an Irish hurler. At club level he plays with Graignamanagh and at inter-county level with the Kilkenny senior hurling team.

== Career ==
Bolger attended Kilkenny CBS and played in all grades of hurling during his time there, including in the Leinster Colleges SAHC. He later studied at Dublin City University and earned selection to their Fitzgibbon Cup team. At club level, Bolger plays with Graignamanagh.

At inter-county level, Bolger first played for Kilkenny as a member of the minor team in 2022. He immediately progressed to the under-20 team and lined out with them in the 3–19 to 1–16 defeat by Tipperary in the 2025 All-Ireland U20HC final. Bolger made his senior team debut in a National Hurling League game against Cork in March 2026.

== Honours ==
Kilkenny

- Leinster Under-20 Hurling Championship: 2025
