= John Madden (hurler) =

Irish hurler and selector

Personal information
- Native name: Seán Ó Madáin (Irish)
- Born: 1968 (age 57–58) Lorrha, County Tipperary, Ireland
- Occupation: Sales
- Height: 6 ft 1 in (185 cm)

Sport
- Sport: Hurling
- Position: Right corner-back
Club
- Years: Club
- Lorrha–Dorrha
Club titles
- Tipperary titles: 0
Inter-county
Years	County	Apps (scores)
1989-1991	Tipperary	4 (0-00)
Inter-county titles
- Munster titles: 2
- All-Irelands: 2
- NHL: 0
- All Stars: 0

John Madden (born 13 February 1968) is an Irish hurling selector and former player whose championship career with the Tipperary senior team lasted three years from 1989 to 1991.

Born in Lorrha, County Tipperary, Madden first appeared at underage levels with the Lorrha–Dorrha club. He subsequently joined the club's senior team and won one North Tipperary championship medal in 1989.

Madden made his debut on the inter-county scene at the age of sixteen when he was picked on the Tipperary minor panel, however, he enjoyed little success in this grade. After failing to make the Tipperary under-21 team in 1987, he was added to the panel in 1988 before claiming Munster and All-Ireland medals in the grade in 1989. Madden was added to the Tipperary senior panel in 1989 and won his first All-Ireland medal that year, albeit as a non-playing substitute. He later became a regular on the starting fifteen, however, he won his second All-Ireland medal in 1991 as a non-playing substitute once again. Madden played his last game for Tipperary in July 1991.

In retirement from playing Madden became involved in team management and coaching. He was a selector with the Portumna senior team that won the All-Ireland title in 2014. Madden later served as manager of the Silvermines senior team before being appointed as a selector with the Tipperary senior team in 2015. . On 4 September 2016, Tipperary defeated Kilkenny in the final by 2–29 to 2-20.

== Honours ==
=== Player ===
Lorrha–Dorrha

- North Tipperary Senior Hurling Championship (1): 1989

Tipperary

- New York Senior Hurling Championship (5): 1997, 1999, 2000, 2002, 2003

Tipperary

- All-Ireland Senior Hurling Championship (2): 1989 1991
- Munster Senior Hurling Championship (2): 1989, 1991

New York

- All-Ireland Senior B Hurling Championship (1): 1996

=== Selector ===
Portumna

- All-Ireland Senior Club Hurling Championship (1): 2014
- Galway Senior Hurling Championship (1): 2013

Tipperary

- Munster Senior Hurling Championship (1): 2016

All Ireland Senior Hurling Championship 2016
