= John Cummins (Gaelic footballer) =

Tipperary Gaelic footballer

Personal information
- Native name: Seán Ó Cuimin (Irish)
- Born: 1948 (age 77–78) Ardfinnan, County Tipperary, Ireland

Sport
- Sport: Gaelic football
- Position: Centre-forward
Club
- Years: Club
- Ardfinnan
Club titles
- Tipperary titles: 2
Inter-county
- Years: County
- 1969–1978: Tipperary
Inter-county titles
- Munster titles: 0
- All-Irelands: 0
- NFL: 0
- All Stars: 0

John Cummins (born 1948) is an Irish Gaelic football manager and former player as a centre-forward at senior level for the Tipperary county team.

== Career ==
Born in Ardfinnan, County Tipperary, Cummins arrived on the inter-county scene at the age of sixteen when he first linked up with the Tipperary minor team, before later joining the under-21 and junior sides. He made his senior debut in the 1969 championship. Cummins went on to play a key role for almost a decade; however, he experienced little in terms of silverware with Tipp.

At club level Cummins won two championship medal with Ardfinnan.

Cummins retired from inter-county football on following the conclusion of the 1978 championship.

In retirement from playing, Cummins became involved in team management and coaching. He has been a long-serving selector, coach and manager to the Tipperary minor and under-21 football teams.

Cummins's son, Brendan, had a lengthy career as a dual player with Tipperary and is regarded as one of the greatest hurling goalkeepers of all-time.

Sporting positions
Preceded by Séamus McCarthy	Tipperary Minor Football Manager; 1987–1989	Succeeded by Séamus McCarthy
Preceded by Noel Byrne	Tipperary Under-21 Football Manager; 1995–1996	Succeeded by Don Ryan
Preceded by Joe Curran	Waterford Senior Football Manager; 1998–1999	Succeeded by Greg Fives
Preceded by Walter Moloney	Tipperary Under-21 Football Manager; 2002–2003	Succeeded by
