= Michael Phelan =

Michael or Mike Phelan may refer to:

- Michael Francis Phelan (1875–1941), Member of the United States House of Representatives from Massachusetts
- Michael L. Phelan (born 1947), judge of the Federal Court of Canada
- Mike Phelan (born 1962), English football player
- Michael Phelan (billiards player) (1819–1871), Irish-born billiards star
- Michael Phelan (football coach), 40th head coach of Franklin & Marshall Diplomats football
- Michael Phelan (hurler) (born 1967), Irish hurler and manager
- Michael Phelan (police officer), Chief Police Officer, Australian Capital Territory Police
- Michael Phelan (Gaelic footballer) (born 1982), Irish Gaelic footballer
- Michael Phelan, writer-director of the 2005 film Into the Fire
