= Babs Keating =

Tipperary hurler and Gaelic footballer

Michael "Babs" Keating
Personal information
- Native name: Mícheál Ó Céitinn (Irish)
- Nickname: Babs
- Born: 17 April 1944 (age 82) Ardfinnan, County Tipperary, Ireland
- Occupation: Retired ESSO executive
- Height: 5 ft 9 in (175 cm)

Sport
- Sport: Hurling
- Position: Left wing-forward
Clubs
- Years: Club
- Ballybacon–Grange; Ardfinnan
Club titles
	Football	Hurling
Tipperary titles	5	0
Inter-county*
Years	County	Apps (scores)
1964–1975	Tipperary	27 (16–65)
Inter-county titles
- Munster titles: 4
- All-Irelands: 2
- NHL: 2
- All Stars: 1
Inter-county management
- Years: Team
- 1978–1979 1986–1994 1995–1997 1997–1998 2005–2007: Galway; Tipperary; Laois; Offaly; Tipperary
Inter-county titles as manager
County	League	Province	All-Ireland
Tipperary	2	5	5
- *Inter County team apps and scores correct as of 17:01, 18 February 2015.

Michael "Babs" Keating (born 17 April 1944) is an Irish former hurler and Gaelic footballer who played as a forward for the Tipperary senior teams.

Born in Ardfinnan, County Tipperary, Keating first played competitive Gaelic games during his schooling at CBS High School Clonmel. He arrived on the inter-county scene at the age of sixteen when he first linked up with the Tipperary minor teams in both codes, before later joining the under-21 sides. He joined the senior football panel during the 1960 championship before being added to the senior hurling panel four years later. Keating was a regular member of the starting fifteen on both teams, and won two All-Ireland medals, four Munster medals and two National Hurling League medals. He was an All-Ireland runner-up on two occasions.

As a member of both Munster inter-provincial teams on a number of occasions, Keating won a combined total of three Railway Cup medals. At club level he was a five-time football championship medallist with Ardfinnan. Keating played his club hurling with Ballybacon–Grange.

Throughout his career Keating made 27 championship appearances with the senior hurlers. He retired from inter-county hurling following the conclusion of the 1975 championship, however, his inter-county football career lasted until the end of the 1980 championship.

Keating is widely regarded one of the greatest players of his generation. In 1971 he was named on the inaugural All-Star team, while he also collected the Texaco Hurler of the Year award. Delaney was also chosen as one of the 125 greatest hurlers of all time in a 2009 poll.

In retirement from playing Keating became involved in team management and coaching. At various times he has served as manager of the Galway, Offaly and Laois senior teams, however, it has been with his own native Tipperary that he enjoyed his greatest success, guiding the team to two All-Ireland victories.

== Biography ==
Michael Keating was born in Ardfinnan, County Tipperary in 1944. The youngest member of a large family, he received the nickname 'Babs' when he went to national school where he was the youngest of three Michael Keatings in the school. The nickname has remained with him into adult life and he is almost always exclusively referred to as Babs. As well as his sporting career, Keating has worked for many years for the petroleum oil company Esso. He is married to Nancy Maher, sister of Gerry Maher and his son-in-law is Irish jockey Johnny Murtagh, who is married to his daughter Orla.

== Playing career ==
=== Club ===
Keating enjoyed a lengthy club hurling career with Ballybacon–Grange, winning a number of divisional championship medals, however, it was with the Ardfinnan footballers that he enjoyed his greatest successes.

In 1962 Ardfinnan made a long-awaited breakthrough in the senior championship. A 4–11 to 1–6 defeat of Thurles Crokes gave Keating, who lined out at centre-forward, his first championship medal.

The following year Keating was at full-forward as Ardfinnan qualified for a second successive county decider. A relatively comfortable 1–9 to 1–2 defeat of Templemore gave him a second championship medal.

Ardfinnan made it three-in-a-row in 1964. Keating bagged 2–2 in a 5–10 to 3–3 defeat of a disjointed and disappointing North selection. It was Keating's third championship medal.

After securing the three-in-a-row, Ardfinnan went on to lose three deciders in-a-row at the end of the decade. This losing streak was halted in 1970, with Keating collecting a fourth championship medal following an ugly 1–11 to 2–2 defeat of Clonmel Commercials

Keating won a fifth and final championship medal in 1974, following a narrow 1–6 to 1–4 defeat of Fethard.

=== Minor and under-21 ===
Keating first played for Tipperary as a dual player in the minor grades in 1960. He won his first Munster medal with the hurlers that year, following a 6–7 to 4–3 defeat of Galway. The subsequent All-Ireland decider saw Tipperary face Kilkenny in a repeat of the previous years final. A huge 7–12 to 1–11 defeat was Keating's lot on that occasion.

In 1961 Keating added a second Munster medal to his collection following a 7–11 to 1–6 defeat of Cork. The subsequent All-Ireland decider saw Tipperary face Kilkenny for the third successive year. The game was much closer than the previous year, however, Keating still ended up on the losing side by 3–13 to 0–15.

Keating was captain of the minor team in 1962. He won a third successive Munster medal that year as Tipperary outclassed Cork by 4–11 to 4–1. Kilkenny were the opponents in the subsequent All-Ireland decider once again, however, "the Cats" maintained the upper hand over their near neighbours. Goals were key as a 3–6 to 0–9 defeat meant Ketaing ended up on the losing side for a third successive year. It was his last game in the minor grade.

In 1964 Keating was an automatic choice on Tipperary's inaugural under-21 hurling team. An 8–9 to 3–1 defeat of Waterford gave him a Munster medal in that grade. Wexford provided the opposition in the subsequent All-Ireland decider, however, the game turned into a rout. A huge 8–9 to 3–1 victory gave Keating an All-Ireland Under-21 Hurling Championship medal.

Keating missed Tipperary's second consecutive Munster under-21 triumph in 1965, however, he was restored to the starting fifteen for the subsequent All-Ireland final against Wexford. The Leinster champions avenged the previous years defeat as Tipperary fell to a 3–7 to 1–4 defeat.

=== Senior ===
==== Early success ====
Having been a regular member of the Tipperary senior football team since 1960, Keating joined the Tipperary senior hurlers in 1964. He won his first National Hurling League medal that year following a 4–16 to 6–6 defeat of New York. Keating made his senior championship debut on 5 July 1964 in a 6–13 to 2–5 Munster semi-final defeat of Clare. Tipperary later cantered casually past Cork by fourteen points in the provincial decider, giving Keating his first Munster medal. The All-Ireland final on 6 September 1964 saw reigning champions Kilkenny enter the game as firm favourites against Tipperary. John "Mackey" McKenna scored Tipp's first goal after ten minutes as the Munster champions took a 1–8 to 0–6 interval lead. The second half saw Tipperary score goals for fun, with Donie Nealon getting a hat-trick and Seán McLoughlin another. Kilkenny were humiliated at the full-time whistle as Tipperary triumphed by 5–13 to 2–8. It was Keating's first All-Ireland medal.

Keating found it difficult to nail down a permanent place on the team over the next few years, and he missed Tipperary's All-Ireland triumph in 1965.

==== Tipperary decline ====
After surrendering their provincial crown in 1966, Tipperary bounced back the following year, with Keating, who was restored to the team, winning a second Munster medal following a 4–12 to 2–6 defeat of Clare. 3 September 1967 saw Kilkenny face Tipperary in the All-Ireland decider. Tipp looked like continuing their hoodoo over their near rivals as they took a 2–6 to 1–3 lead at half-time. Goalkeeper Ollie Walsh was the hero for Kilkenny as he made a series of spectacular saves, however, the team lost Eddie Keher and Tom Walsh to injury in the second half. In spite of this, Kilkenny laid to rest a bogey that Tipperary had over the team since 1922, and a 3–8 to 2–7 victory resulted in defeat for Keating's team.

Keating added a second league medal to his collection in 1968 following a 6–27 to 4–22 aggregate defeat of New York. Tipperary later retained their status as provincial kingpins and a 2–13 to 1–7 trouncing of Cork gave Keating a third Munster medal. For the fourth time of the decade, Wexford were Tipp's opponents in the subsequent All-Ireland final on 1 September 1968. At half-time it looked as if Tipperary were cruising to another victory as they took an eight-point lead. Just after the restart Wexford had a Christy Jacob goal disallowed before Tony Doran scored a goal after just six minutes. Tipp fought back; however, it was too late as Wexford won a remarkable game by 5–8 to 3–12.

==== Twilight success ====
By 1971 Keating had come to be regarded as one of the great full-forwards of the era, as Tipperary regrouped for one final push at glory. A 4–16 to 3–18 victory over Limerick gave him a fourth Munster medal. On 5 September 1971 Kilkenny faced Tipperary in the All-Ireland final, the first to be broadcast in colour by Telefís Éireann and the only eighty-minute meeting between the two sides. Kilkenny's ever-dependable goalkeeper, Ollie Walsh, had a nightmare of a game in which he conceded five goals, one of which passed through his legs, while Keating played out the closing stages of the game in his bare feet. Tipperary emerged the victors on a score line of 5–17 to 5–14. It was his second All-Ireland medal. Keating finished off the year by winning an All-Star before being named Texaco Hurler of the Year.

==== Final years ====
Tipperary went into decline following this victory as Limerick and Cork dominated the provincial series. On 20 July 1975 he played his last game for the Tipperary hurlers in a 0–17 to 1–10 Munster semi-final replay defeat by Limerick. He lined out with the Tipperary footballers for one further season in 1976, however, he was recalled to the team at the age of thirty-six in 1980.

=== Inter-provincial ===
In 1965 Keating was at left wing-forward as the Munster inter-provincial hurling team faced their age-old rivals Leinster in the championship decider. The southern province was completely outclassed on that occasion as Leinster powered to a 3–11 to 0–9 victory.

After failing to be picked for the team over the next two years, Keating was back with Munster in 1968 as the team faced Leinster once again in the inter-provincial decider. A 0–14 to 0–10 victory gave him his first Railway Cup medal.

In 1970 Keating lined out with Munster once again as the team faced Leinster in the decider. A huge 2–15 to 0–9 victory gave him his second Railway Cup medal.

Keating was a regular on the Munster inter-provincial football team during this period as well. In 1972 he was a member of the starting team that faced Leinster in the decider. A 1–15 apiece draw was the result on that occasion, however, the southern province made no mistake in the replay. A double scores 2–14 to 0–10 victory gave Keating a Railway Cup medal with the footballers, his third overall.

== Managerial career ==
=== Galway ===
Keating had just retired from inter-county hurling when he became involved in inter-county coaching. After an unsuccessful one-year stint as trainer of the Galway senior hurlers during the 1976–77 season, he was back as coach a year later. A good run of results during the group stage of the league allowed the team qualify for the final where Ketaing's native county of Tipperary provided the opposition. A 3–15 to 0–8 trouncing was the result on that occasion. Keating's side later shocked four-in-a-row hopefuls Cork in the All-Ireland semi-final and qualified for an All-Ireland final showdown with Kilkenny on 2 September 1979. In one of the worst All-Ireland finals of the decade, Tipperary-born Galway goalkeeper Séamus Shinnors had an absolute nightmare of a game. A 70-yards free by Liam "Chunky" O'Brien after just four minutes dipped, hit off Shinnors and ended up in the Galway net. Galway fought back and went two points up twelve minutes into the second half, however, they failed to score for the rest of the game. Four minutes before the end of the game another long-range free for Kilkenny ended up in the net behind Shinnors. It was a score which summed up the day for Keating's side as Kilkenny went on to win by 2–12 to 1–8.

=== First spell with Tipperary ===
In 1986 the Tipperary senior hurling team had hit an all-time low. The county hadn't won a Munster title since 1971 and went almost a decade without winning a single championship game. Tony Wall took over as manager in 1986, however, at the end of the year the Tipperary County Board turned to Keating in an effort to revive the county's flagging fortunes. In his first full season in charge, he guided the team to the Munster title after a stunning draw and extra-time replay victory over six-in-a-row hopefuls Cork.

Keating's side secured the league title in 1988 following a 3–15 to 2–9 defeat of Offaly. He later guided the team to a second successive Munster title as Cork were easily accounted for by 2–19 to 1–13. On 4 September 1988 Tipperary faced Galway in the All-Ireland decider. Galway had defeated Tipp in the semi-final the previous year, however, with an extra year's experience it was expected that Tipperary might shade the victory. Galway used this to motivate themselves. Noel Lane again scored the crucial goal for Galway while captain for the day Nicky English sent a late penalty over the bar for a point. A 1–15 to 0–14 score line resulted in defeat. Keating's two star players, Pat Fox and Nicky English, did not play to their potential that day and the manager also received criticism for introducing John Leahy, then an unknown teenager.

Tipperary made it a provincial three-in-a-row in 1989, with Keating's side winning a third Munster title following a 0–26 to 2–8 defeat of an overtly physical Waterford. On 3 September 1989 Tipperary faced Antrim in a unique All-Ireland final. The game was a one-sided affair from start to finish, with Nicky English setting a new scoring record by bagging 2–12 in the 4–24 to 3–9 victory. It was a first All-Ireland title for Keating as manager.

In 1990 Keating set out to prove that Tipperary's All-Ireland victory was not a flash-in-the-pan. Accordingly, both the team and the manager exuded an over-confidence from the start of the championship. In an infamous interview Keating dismissed Cork's chances in the championship by stating that "donkeys don’t win derbies." This comment severely riled the Cork hurlers, so much so that they defeated Tipperary by 4–16 to 2–14 in a classic Munster final.

Keating's side regrouped in 1991 and collected a fourth Munster title in five years following a remarkable 4–19 to 4–15 replay defeat of Cork. On 1 September 1991 Tipperary faced old rivals Kilkenny in the All-Ireland decider. The opening thirty-five minutes saw both sides trade score-for-score, however, a controversial 20-metre free, miss-hit by Michael Cleary, landed in the net and gave Tipp a lead which they never surrendered. The final score of 1–16 to 0–15 resulted in a second All-Ireland title for Keating as manager.

After a disappointing 1992 season, Tipperary claimed the Munster title again in 1993 following a huge 3–27 to 2–12 trouncing of Clare.

Tipperary annexed a second league title under Keating's stewardship in 1994, however, his side later exited the championship at an early stage. This defeat brought the curtain down on his managerial career with Tipperary.

=== Laois ===
On 8 September 1995 Keating was appointed manager of the Laois senior hurling team. Success came early as Keating's new charges qualified for the semi-final of the league. A narrow two-point defeat at the hands of Tipperary was the result on that occasion. Unfortunately for Keating, this proved to be the highlight of his tenure as Laois failed to record a single championship victory in either 1996 or 1997. Keating resigned following the team's 1997 championship exit.

=== Offaly ===
On 21 October 1997, Keating was appointed manager of the Offaly senior hurling team. Offaly, unlike Laois, had had several successes in the preceding years. They had won the All-Ireland title in 1994 and were regarded as one of the most skillful groups of hurlers in the country. The team also earned a reputation for being lazy when it came to training. While this was something that Keating sought to rectify, he earned the enmity of some key players. Relations is the dressing room were frosty at best, however, Keating's feelings weren't properly expressed until after the 1998 Leinster final defeat by Kilkenny. In a post-match interview Keating lamented his players performance and described the team as "sheep in a heap". The Offaly players took umbrage to his statement and effectively forced Keating out as manager. He was replaced by Michael Bond and Offaly later went on to win the All-Ireland title.

=== Return to Tipperary ===
In 2005, the Tipperary senior hurling team was in the doldrums. After winning the All-Ireland title in 2001 the team took a backward step and recorded few victories of note in the intervening years. After Ken Hogan's resignation as manager at the end of that year's championship, the Tipp County Board turned to Keating in an effort to revive the county's flagging fortunes once again.

Keating's first game of the championship was a Munster quarter-final meeting with near neighbours Limerick on 14 May 2006. In the first ten minutes Limerick scored two goals, however, Tipp fought back to seal the victory. A defeat of Waterford in the Munster semi-final set up a second consecutive Munster final meeting with Cork. Keating's side got off to a good start, however, the All-Ireland champions showed their worth by a capturing a 2–14 to 1–14 victory over Tipp. The subsequent All-Ireland quarter-final saw Keating's side take on Waterford for the second time that year. There was some mild controversy from the Tipp camp over this second meeting of the two sides. Keating was less than pleased when Waterford reversed the earlier defeat and captured a three-point victory.

2007 saw Keating's side taken on Limerick in their opening game. It was a game that Tipp were expected to win, however, Limerick put up a good fight and the game ended in a draw. For the replay of the game Keating made the drastic move of dropping legendary goalkeeper Brendan Cummins. The second game saw Keating's side lead by ten points at one stage, however, by the end of the seventy minutes both sides were level once again. A period of extra-time failed to separate these two sides were forced to meet for a third time. Once again extra-time had to be played, however, after nearly four hours of hurling Limerick emerged as the winners. After the defeat Keating looked less than impressed when he was forced to do a television interview alongside ecstatic Limerick manager Richie Bennis. The All-Ireland qualifiers saw Keating's side win all of their games, including a victory over Cork for the first time since 1991. It looked as if Tipp had come out on the easy side of the draw as their opponents, Wexford, were not regarded as being up to much. Because of this Keating may have been guilty of having one eye on the All-Ireland semi-final. His decision to relegate star forward Eoin Kelly to the substitutes bench baffled many, particularly since Kelly tops the chart as Tipp's all-time top scorer. The game itself was an exciting one, however, a Damien Fitzhenry penalty sealed the victory for Wexford and dumped Tipp out of the championship. Keating resigned as manager shortly after this defeat.

== Honours ==
=== Player ===
Ballybacon–Grange

- South Tipperary Senior Hurling Championship: 1968
- South Tipperary Under-21 A Hurling Championship: 1961, 1963
- South Tipperary Minor A Hurling Championship: 1961

Ardfinnan

- Tipperary Senior Football Championship: 1962, 1963, 1964, 1970, 1974
- South Tipperary Senior Football Championship: 1961, 1962, 1963, 1964, 1968, 1973, 1974
- Tipperary Under-21 A Football Championship: 1963
- South Tipperary Under-21 A Football Championship: 1962, 1963, 1964, 1965
- Tipperary Minor A Football Championship: 1961, 1962
- South Tipperary Minor A Football Championship: 1961, 1962

Tipperary

- All-Ireland Senior Hurling Championship: 1964, 1971
- Munster Senior Hurling Championship: 1964, 1967, 1968, 1971
- National Hurling League: 1963–64, 1967–68
- All-Ireland Under-21 Hurling Championship: 1964
- Munster Under-21 Hurling Championship: 1964, 1965
- Munster Minor Hurling Championship: 1960, 1961, 1962

Railway Cup

- Football: 1972
- Hurling: 1968, 1970

=== Management ===
Tipperary

- All-Ireland Senior Hurling Championship: 1989, 1991
- Munster Senior Hurling Championship: 1987, 1988, 1989, 1991, 1993
- National Hurling League: 1987-88, 1993–94

Awards
Preceded by Pat McDonnell (Cork)	Texaco Hurler of the Year; 1971	Succeeded by Eddie Keher (Kilkenny)
Achievements
Preceded by Cyril Farrell (Galway)	All-Ireland Senior Hurling Final winning manager 1989	Succeeded by Fr. Michael O'Brien (Cork)
Preceded by Fr. Michael O'Brien (Cork)	All-Ireland Senior Hurling Final winning manager 1991	Succeeded by Ollie Walsh (Kilkenny)
Sporting positions
Preceded by	Galway Senior Hurling Manager; 1976–1977	Succeeded by Joe McGrath
Preceded by Joe McGrath	Galway Senior Hurling Manager; 1978–1979	Succeeded by Cyril Farrell
Preceded by Tadhg O'Connor	Tipperary Senior Hurling Captain; 1972	Succeeded by Mick Cowan
Preceded by Tony Wall	Tipperary Senior Hurling Manager; 1986–1994	Succeeded by Fr. Tom Fogarty
Preceded by Pat Critchley	Laois Senior Hurling Manager; 1995–1997	Succeeded by Pádraig Horan
Preceded by John McIntyre	Offaly Senior Hurling Manager; 1997–1998	Succeeded by Michael Bond
Preceded by Ken Hogan	Tipperary Senior Hurling Manager; 2005–2007	Succeeded by Liam Sheedy
