= Lorrha–Dorrha GAA =

Gaelic games club in County Tipperary, Ireland

Lorrha–Dorrha
- Lothra agus Doire
- Founded: 1885
- County: Tipperary
- Colours: Blue and White
- Grounds: Tony Reddin Park (formerly St. Ruadhan's Park)
- Coordinates: 53°07′10.24″N 8°06′35.30″W

Playing kits
Standard colours

Lorrha–Dorrha GAA is a Tipperary GAA club which is located in County Tipperary, Ireland. Both hurling and Gaelic football are played in the North Tipperary divisional competitions. The club is centred on the parish of "Lorrha & Dorrha". The club is most famous for Hurling Team of the Millennium goalkeeper Tony Reddin, who played with the club from 1947 to 1957. Ken Hogan, who is a former manager and goalkeeper of Tipperary GAA, also played with Lorrha as did the heroes of the 1971 All-Ireland Championship team, Liam King and Noel Lane. In more recent times, John Madden was the club's representative on the team which won All-Ireland honours in 1989 and 1991. Also notable is Patrick 'Bonner' Maher (2009–present) who is the only Lorrha player to win both All-Ireland and Munster Medals at Senior, Under-21 and Minor with Tipperary And the mighty Lack O'Meara

== Honours ==
- Tipperary Premier Intermediate Hurling Championship Winners: 1
  - 2023
- Tipperary Intermediate Hurling Championship Winners: 1
  - 2007, 2022
- North Tipperary Senior Hurling Championship: 8
  - 1905, 1914, 1924, 1948, 1956, 1966, 1984, 1989
- North Tipperary Senior Football Championship: 1
  - 1983
- North Tipperary Premier Intermediate Hurling championship
  - 2023
- North Tipperary Intermediate Hurling Championship: 2
  - 1946, 2007, 2022
- North Tipperary Intermediate Football Championship: 2
  - 1983, 1984
- Tipperary Junior A Hurling Championship: 1
  - 1946
- North Tipperary Junior A Hurling Championship: 4
  - 1917, 1961, 1966, 1987
- Tipperary Junior B Hurling Championship: 1
  - 2003
- North Tipperary Junior B Hurling Championship: 1
  - 2003
- Tipperary Junior A Football Championship: 1
  - 1971
- North Tipperary Junior A Football Championship: 3
  - 1966, 1968, 1975
- Tipperary Under-21 A Hurling Championship: 1
  - 1966 (with Knockshegowna)
- North Tipperary Under-21 A Hurling Championship: 2
  - 1965 (with Knockshegowna), 1966 (with Knockshegowna)
- North Tipperary Under-21 B Hurling Championship: 2
  - 1983, 2017
- Tipperary Minor B Hurling Championship 1
  - 2006
- North Tipperary Minor B Hurling Championship: 3
  - 1993, 2006, 2010
- Tipperary Minor C Hurling Championship 1
  - 2000
- North Tipperary Minor C Hurling Championship: 1
  - 2000
- North Tipperary Minor B Football Championship 1
  - 2007
- North Tipperary Minor C Football Championship: 1
  - 2003

== Notable players ==
- Mick Cronin
- Tom Duffy
- Christy Forde
- Brian Hogan
- Ken Hogan
- Liam King
- Noel Lane
- John McIntyre
- John Madden
- Patrick "Bonner" Maher
- Tony Reddin
