= John McIntyre (hurler) =

Irish hurler and manager (born 1961)

Personal information
- Native name: Seán Mac an tSaoir (Irish)
- Born: Lorrha, County Tipperary
- Occupation: Journalist

Sport
- Sport: Hurling
- Position: Centre-back
Club
- Years: Club
- 1970s–1980s: Lorrha–Dorrha
Club titles
- Tipperary titles: 0
Inter-county
Years	County	Apps (scores)
1983–1986	Tipperary	8 (0–0)
Inter-county titles
- Munster titles: 0
- All-Irelands: 0
- NHL: 0
- All Stars: 0

John McIntyre (born 1961 in Lorrha, County Tipperary) is an Irish hurling manager and former player. He is the former manager of the Galway senior hurling team.

An effective centre-back, McIntyre enjoyed a relatively successful playing career at club level with Lorrha–Dorrha and at inter-county level with Tipperary. He was a member of the latter team for a number of seasons in the 1980s, when Tipperary were going through an uncharacteristic drought in terms of championship success.

After his playing days ended McIntyre gained notoriety as a manager and coach at all levels. A successful stint as coach working alongside manager Billy McGrath of the Clarinbridge club team in Galway followed his first term as manager of the Offaly senior hurling team in the 1990s. McIntyre returned as Offaly manager almost a decade later before being appointed manager of the Galway senior hurling team in November 2008.

== Playing career ==
=== Club ===
McIntyre played his club hurling with his local team Lorrha–Dorrha and enjoyed some success during the 1980s. In 1984 he captured a north Tipperary divisional title in 1984. This victory paved the way for Lorrha–Dorrha to advance to the final of the county senior championship. Moycarkey–Borris provided the opposition on that occasion, however, McIntyre's side could not match them. A 2–8 to 0–9 score line resulted in defeat for the north Tipp club. In spite of this, Lorrha–Dorrha were named club of the year in 1984, the centenary year of the Gaelic Athletic Association.

McIntyre added a second north Tipperary title to his collection in 1989.

=== Inter-county ===
McIntyre first came to prominence on the inter-county scene as a member of the Tipperary under-21 hurling team in the early 1980s. That year Tipp were hoping to capture a third All-Ireland under-21 title in-a-row. McIntyre was a key member of the team that claimed the Munster title following a 1–15 to 0–10 defeat of arch-rivals Cork. Tipperary later qualified for the All-Ireland final and McIntyre was once again named in the centre-back position on the team. Kilkenny provided the opposition, however, Tipp had too much for their near neighbours and fierce rivals. A final score of 2–16 to 1–10 meant that McIntyre had picked up an All-Ireland under-21 winners' medal.

McIntyre subsequently joined the Tipperary senior inter-county team, making his championship debut in a Munster quarter-final against Clare in 1983. It was a n uncharacteristic lean period for Tipp.

In his second season McIntyre lined out in his first Munster final. Cork provided the opposition and were going for a third provincial title in succession. Tipperary were hoping to win their first since 1971. With four minutes remaining Tipperary led by four points and the hoodoo looked set to end. Cork's Seánie O'Leary and Tony O'Sullivan had a different idea. Two quick goals clinched a 4–15 to 3–14 victory and McIntyre's side were defeated once again.

In 1985 Tipperary and Cork went to battle in the Munster decider once again. On this occasion there was no nail-biting finish as Cork secured a 4–17 to 4–11 victory and McIntyre found himself on the losing side for the second time.

By 1986 McIntyre was relegated to the substitutes' bench and was replaced at centre-back by Noel Sheehy. He came on as a replacement in Tipp's Munster semi-final defeat by Clare. This was his last game with Tipperary.

== Managerial career ==
=== Clarinbridge ===
In 2001 McIntyre was recruited to the Clarinbridge senior hurling team as coach. It was a successful year for the club, as Clarinbridge reached the final of the county senior championship. Reigning All-Ireland club champions Athenry provided the opposition and were the favourites going into the game. Former Galway star Darragh Coen scored a point from a disputed free deep into injury time to secure a deserved 0–18 to 2–11 victory for McIntyre's side. It was Calrinbridge's first county title. The club subsequently reached the Connacht club final. Four Roads of Roscommon provided the opposition, however, Clarinbridge were too strong and won the game by 2–18 to 1–6. McIntyre's side later defeated Ballygunner in the All-Ireland semi-final to set up a championship decider meeting with Birr. That game at Semple Stadium saw Birr take complete control and defeat Clarinbridge by 2–10 to 1–5.

=== Offaly ===
In late 1996 McIntyre became involved in inter-county management for the first time when he took charge of the Offaly senior team. His term in charge was not a successful one. After an average National League campaign Offaly subsequently had an unlucky Leinster semi-final defeat by Wexford. McIntyre's side lost that game by three points on a day when it took a fantastic save by Damien Fitzhenry to prevent Billy Dooley from scoring an equalising goal in injury-time. He was subsequently ousted as manager and replaced by fellow county-man Michael 'Babs' Keating.

McIntyre was appointed Offaly manager for the second time on 15 November 2004. By this stage Offaly was no longer the hurling power that it was in the 1980s and 1990s. His first season on charge was far from successful. After a 6–28 to 0–15 thrashing by Kilkenny in the Leinster semi-final, McIntyre's side later crashed out of the championship in the All-Ireland qualifier group stage. By 2006 little had changed. After a defeat by Wexford in the Leinster semi-final, McIntyre's side later exited the championship in the All-Ireland qualifier group stage once again. 2007 saw the pattern continue with Offaly being defeated in the semi-final stage of the provincial championship. A defeat of Dublin in the qualifiers failed to save McIntyre's side from being dumped out of the championship. He resigned as manager shortly afterwards.

=== Galway ===
McIntyre was confirmed as manager of the Galway senior hurling team, in succession to Ger Loughnane, on 18 November 2008. There were high hopes for Galway as the team entered the Leinster championship for the first time. After a trouncing of Laois in the opening round, McIntyre's Galway faced three-in-a-row All-Ireland champions Kilkenny in the provincial semi-final. Galway went five points ahead but 'the Cats' clawed their way back to win by 2–20 to 3–13. Galway later defeated Clare and Cork before being surprisingly defeated by Waterford in an All-Ireland quarter-final. In May 2010, he guided Galway to win the 2010 National Hurling League with a 2–22 to 1–17 win against Cork at Semple Stadium. In September 2011 McIntyre resigned as manager after a very disappointing season.

== Personal life ==
As of 2004, McIntyre was living in Galway and was sports editor of the Connacht Tribune.

Sporting positions
Preceded by Éamonn Cregan	Offaly Senior Hurling Manager; 1996–1997	Succeeded by Michael 'Babs' Keating
Preceded by Mike McNamara	Offaly Senior Hurling Manager; 2004–2007	Succeeded by Joe Dooley
Preceded by Ger Loughnane	Galway Senior Hurling Manager; 2008–2011	Succeeded by Anthony Cunningham
