= Ruadhán of Lorrha =

Irish abbot and saint

Saint Ruadhán of Lorrha
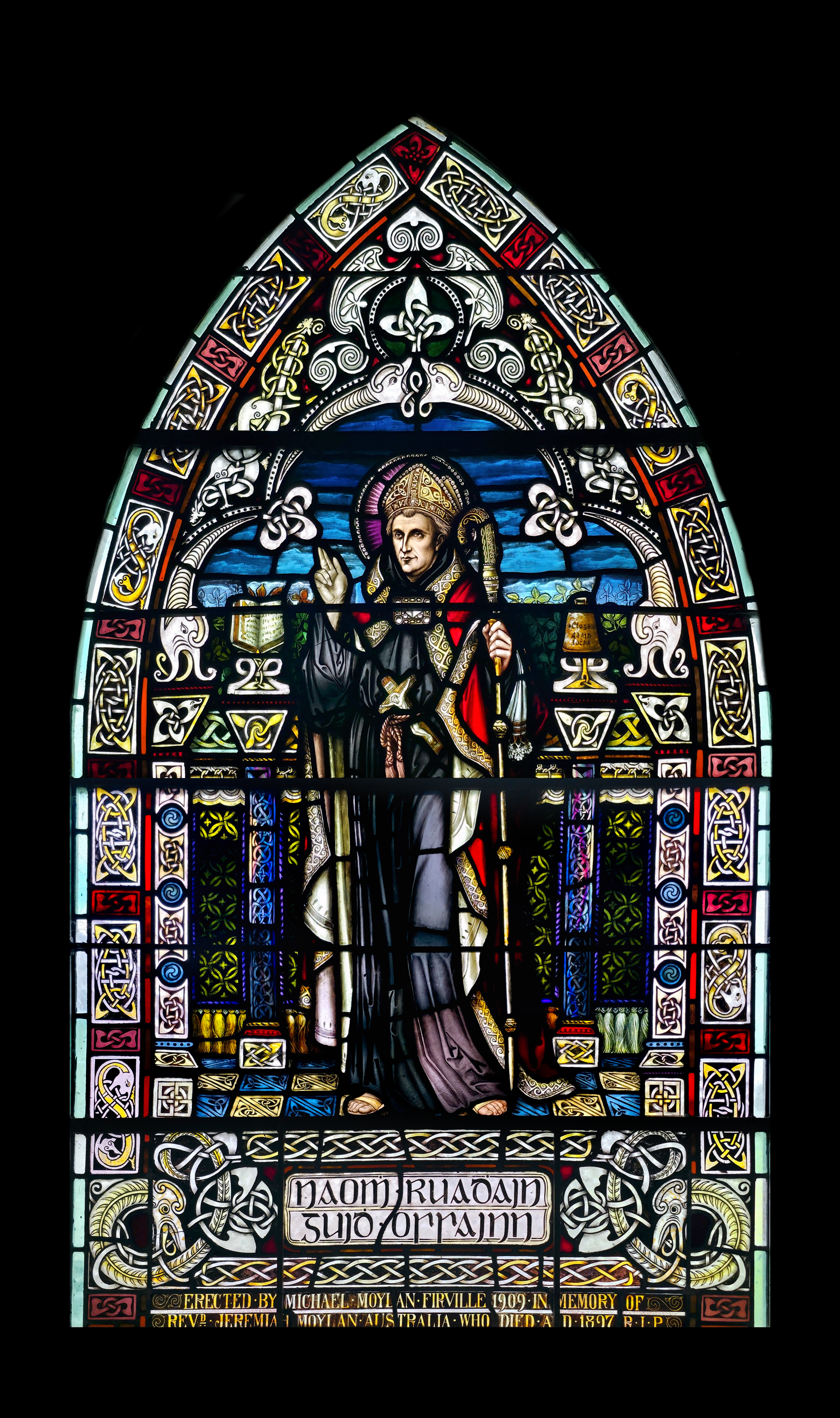
- St. Ruadhan by James Watson & Co. at St. Ruadhan's Church Lorrha
- Born: unknown Teamhair, Kingdom of Meath, Gaelic Ireland
- Died: 15 April 584; Monastery of Lothra, Munster, Gaelic Ireland
- Venerated in: Catholic Church, Eastern Orthodox Church
- Feast: 15 April

Ruadán mac Fergusa Birn, also known Rowan, Ruadon, Roadan, Ruadhán, Rodon and Rodan, (died 15 April 584) was an Irish Christian abbot who founded the monastery of Lorrha (Lothra, County Tipperary, Ireland), near Terryglass. He was known for his prophecies. After his death, he was venerated as a saint and as one of the "Twelve Apostles of Ireland". His feast day is 15 April.

== Life ==
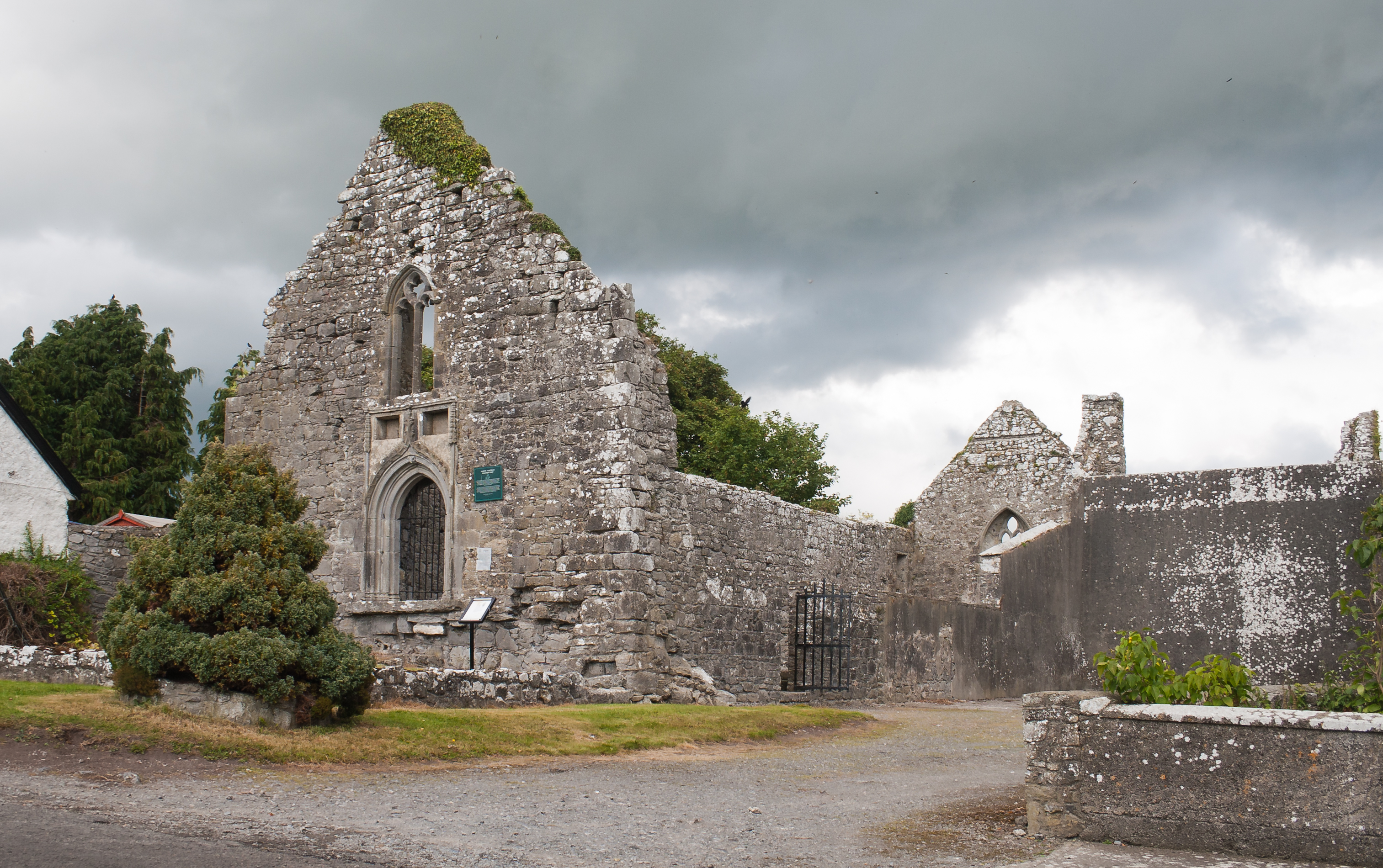
Lorrha Priory of St. Ruadan

Ruadan was born in Tara in Leinster, Ireland, and was educated at Clonard, County Westmeath by Finnian. He is known as one of the Twelve Apostles of Ireland. He is said to have replaced Brendan the Navigator at Lorrha, who then crossed the Shannon and set up his monastery at Clonfert, County Galway. Ruadan founded a monastic settlement there, where he directed 150 monks. A ditch or large mound would have been built around the settlement to keep animals in and intruders out, the outlines of which are still visible today. Life for the monks would have been tough but simple, rising early from their beds which would have consisted of rushes or straw placed on the bare ground. They then would pray and fast between their domestic chores. The settlement would have been self-sufficient in those days providing everything from food, and clothing, to shelter. Villages and towns often popped up around monastic settlements as trade and refuge attracted the local people, the origin of Lorrha village can be attributed to this.

Ruadan is said to have died at the monastery of Lorrha on 15 April 584. His feast is kept on the anniversary of his death.

== Ruadhán's prophecy ==
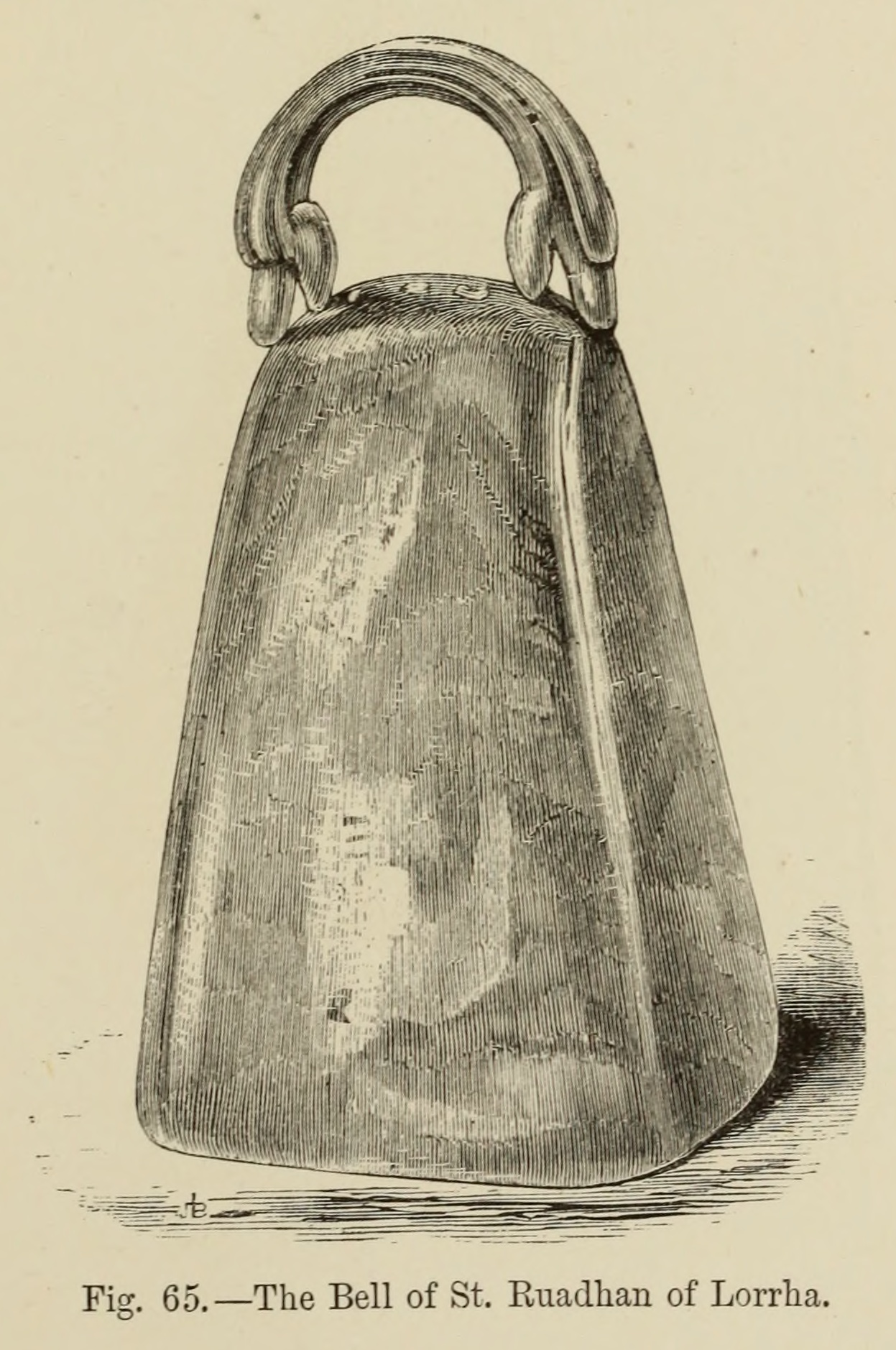
The Bell of St. Ruadhán. Cast bronze with decorated handle.

His embassy in 556 to King Diarmait mac Cerbaill at Tara, is worked into a legend known as the "Curse of Tara", but the high king continued to reside at Tara till his death in 564. The legend as to Tara's halls having been deserted after 564 is of comparatively late origin. Adomnan held a synod at Tara in 697.

Diarmuid Mac Cerbhaill had violated the sanctity of the church by taking a hostage from its protection. The downfall of Tara from a once-thriving royal residence is credited to Ruadhan.

Ruadhán gave the prophecy that Diarmait would be killed by the roof-beam of his hall at Tara. Diarmait had the beam cast into the sea. Diarmait then asked his druids to find the manner of his death, and they foretold that he would die of slaughter, drowning and burning, and that the signs of his death would be a shirt grown from a single seed of flax and a mantle of wool from a single sheep, ale brewed from one seed of corn, and bacon from a sow which had never farrowed. On a circuit of Ireland, Diarmait comes to the hall of Banbán at Ráith Bec, and there the fate of which he was warned comes to pass. The roof beam of Tara has been recovered from the sea by Banbán and set in his hall, the shirt and mantle and ale and bacon are duly produced for Diarmait. Diarmait goes to leave Banbán's hall, but Áed Dub, waiting at the door, strikes him down and sets fire to the hall. Diarmait crawls into an ale vat to escape the flames and is duly killed by the falling roof beam. Thus, all the prophecies are fulfilled.

The bell of St. Ruadhán was found in a well named after Ruadhán, and is now in the British Museum. This well is situated across the road from the present-day Church of Ireland.

Note that while Ruadhán is traditionally considered a saint, he is not listed in the latest official, complete martyrology of the Catholic Church, the 2004 Martyrologium Romanum in Latin.

== Visio Tnugdali ==
The Visio Tnugdali written c. 1149 refers to Ruadhán as follows:

Suddenly, Saint Ruadan approached them. He welcomed Tundale happily, took him into his arms and hugged him. 'My son, your arrival here is blessed indeed,' he said, and they stood together. 'From now onwards, while you live in the world you can look forward to a good end to your life. I was once your patron saint and in your worldly life you should be willing to show me some generosity and to kneel, as you well know, in my presence. When Saint Ruadan had fallen silent, Tundale looked happily about him and saw Saint Patrick of Ireland, dressed in shining robes alongside many bishops decked out in their finest regalia. They were all joyful and there was no sound of any sighing! Among that blessed company Tundale could see four bishops whom he recognised. They were all good men; one of them was Saint Cellach, a former archbishop of Armagh, who did much good for the sake of Our Lord. Another was Malachias O'Moore, who had become archbishop of Armagh after him and gave everything that he had to the poor. He founded a large number of churches and colleges, as many as forty-four in all, endowed them with land and rents and so allowed many men of religion to serve God devotedly, although he hardly retained enough for himself to live on.
