= Ardfinnan GAA =

GAA club in Tipperary, Ireland

Ardfinnan
- Árdfhionáin
- Founded: 1910
- County: Tipperary
- Nickname: The Village
- Colours: Maroon and white
- Grounds: Ardfinnan GAA ground Clonmel Road
- Coordinates: 52°19′08.61″N 7°51′48.03″W

Playing kits
Standard colours

Senior Club Championships
	All Ireland	Munster champions	Tipperary champions
Football:	-	-	8

Ardfinnan GAA is a Tipperary GAA club which is located in Ardfinnan, County Tipperary, Ireland. The club, which competes at county level and in the South Division of Tipperary GAA, is known by its supporters as "the village". The team's home ground is on the main Ardfinnan to Clonmel road (the R665) just outside the village. The club draws its players and support from the village of Ardfinnan and the neighbouring parishes of Grange and Ballybacon.

Ardfinnan club only plays Gaelic football but the area also has a senior hurling club, Ballybacon-Grange GAA, which is based in Goatenbridge village around three miles from Ardfinnan.

== History ==
Ardfinnan GAA club was formed in 1910. Prior to 1910 local teams had played on the green in Ardfinnan village. At that time the Ardfinnan Woollen Mills had a big influence on the club as many of the players were employed there. Then a junior club, Ardfinnan entered the Tipperary senior championship in 1912 for the first time but were beaten by Fethard. At this time Ardfinnan played in black and white jerseys, and so became known as "the magpies". The colours were then changed to green with a white band and white shamrock; that shamrock still remains on the jerseys to this very day. The club played senior in 1917 and 1918 but due to the War of Independence there was very little football played in the period between 1919 and 1922.

Ardfinnan reached their first South division final in 1927 but were beaten by a Carrick on Suir side that went on to win the County title. In 1928 Ardfinnan had two players on the Tipperary team that beat Kerry in the Munster Senior Football Championship, Ned Lonergan and John O'Leary; to date this was the last time Tipperary beat Kerry in a Munster Championship. The 1960s were Ardfinnan's golden era, in which the club won the county senior title three times and the South senior title five times, including four consecutive seasons.

In November 2005, Ardfinnan won their first county title since 1974 with a 1–5 to 1–4 win against Loughmore-Castleiney in Cashel. That title ended a 31-year famine with a late winning point by player manager Peter Lambert. Ardfinnan went on to lose to Nemo Rangers in the 2005 Munster Championship quarter-final on a 0–6 to 1–13 scoreline in Ardfinnan on 13 November.

In November 2011, the club published its official history.

On 14 October 2018, managed by former Tipperary manager John Evans, Ardfinnan reached their first county final since 2005 after an 0–9 to 0–8 win against Loughmore-Castleiney in the semi-final. In the final, Ardfinnan lost by 1–15 to 1–7 against Moyle Rovers on 28 October.

=== Honours ===
- Tipperary Senior Football Championship (8)
  - 1935, 1939, 1962, 1963, 1964, 1970, 1974, 2005
- South Tipperary Senior Football Championship (10)
  - 1935, 1939, 1961, 1962, 1963, 1964, 1968, 1973, 1974, 2018
- Tipperary Junior 'A' Football Championship (2)
  - 1934
  - (St Finnan's) 1954
- South Tipperary Junior 'A' Football Championship (2)
  - 1934
  - (St Finnan's) 1954
- Tipperary Under-21 'A' Football Championship (2)
  - 1963, 1994, 2013
- South Tipperary Under-21 'A' Football Championship (8)
  - 1962, 1963, 1964, 1965, 1994, 1995, 1997, 2013
- Tipperary Under-21 'B' Football Championship (2)
  - 1992, 2009
- South Tipperary Under-21 'B' Football Championship (4)
  - 1987, 1992, 2009, 2015
- Tipperary Minor 'A' Football Championship (4)
  - 1961, 1962, 1971, 2009
- South Tipperary Minor 'A' Football Championship (9)
  - 1961, 1962, 1969, 1971, 1991, 1994, 1997, 1998, 2009
- Tipperary Minor 'B' Football Championship (1)
  - 2001
- South Tipperary Minor 'B' Football Championship (3)
  - 1988, 2001,2017

== 2005 Tipperary Senior Football Champions squad ==
- Eamon Ryan
  Tony Ryan, Alan John Lonergan, Kieran O'Brien
  Michael Phelan, Hugh Bannon, Cathal Hennessy
  Thomas Maher, Lorcan Bannon
  Alan O'Gorman, Terry Kearns, John R Murphy
  Peter Hally, Peter Lambert, Declan Walsh
  Subs Sean Maher for Hennessy; Michael English for O Gorman; James Hackett for Walsh
  Scorers for Ardfinnan – H Bannon 1–0; P Lambert, P Hally 0–2 each; T Kearns 0–1.

=== Notable players ===
- Colm O'Shaughnessy
- Willie Barrett
- Brendan Cummins
- Michael "Babs" Keating
- Peter Lambert
- John Cummins
- Michael Phelan

== Facilities ==
In 1983, the club made the decision to purchase their own GAA grounds }6.5 acres (2.6 ha) of land on the Clonmel Road, work commenced in late 1984. In May 1988, the club's new grounds on Clonmel road were officially opened. The grounds consisted of a playing field, a covered stand, four changing rooms and a car park for up to 80 cars.
