= Mick Cronin (hurler) =

Tipperary hurler

Personal information
- Native name: Mícheál Ó Cróinín (Irish)
- Born: 26 September 1902 Lorrha, County Tipperary
- Died: 1982 (aged 79–80) Lorrha, County Tipperary
- Occupation: Primary school principal

Sport
- Sport: Hurling
- Position: Left corner-back
Club
- Years: Club
- 1923–1938: Lorrha–Dorrha
Club titles
- Tipperary titles: 0
Inter-county
- Years: County
- 1927–1936: Tipperary
Inter-county titles
- Munster titles: 1
- All-Irelands: 1
- NHL: 1

Michael Finbarr Cronin (26 September 1902 – 1982) was an Irish hurler who played as a left corner-back at senior level for the Tipperary county team.

Cronin made his first appearance for the team during the 1927 championship and was a regular member of the starting fifteen until his retirement after the 1936 championship. During that time he won one All-Ireland medal, one Munster medal and one National League medal.

At club level Cronin had a lengthy career with Lorrha–Dorrha.
