= Ardfinnan Castle =

Castle in Ireland

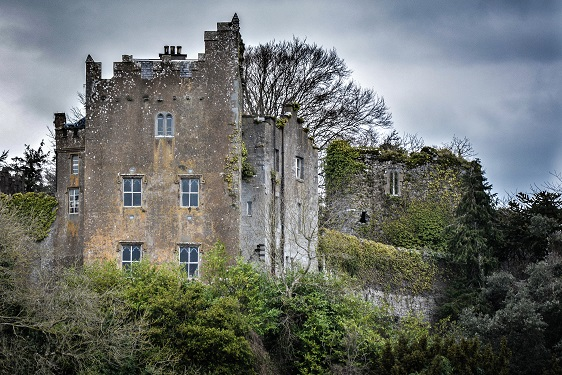
- Ardfinnan Castle, Ardfinnan

- Location within Ireland
- Former names: Castrum de Harfinan

General information
- Type: Castle
- Location: Ardfinnan, County Tipperary, Ireland
- Coordinates: 52.31°N 7.88°W
- Completed: 1185; 841 years ago
- Renovated: 1846
- Client: John, King of England

Design and construction
- Known for: John's first expedition to Ireland, Knights Templar

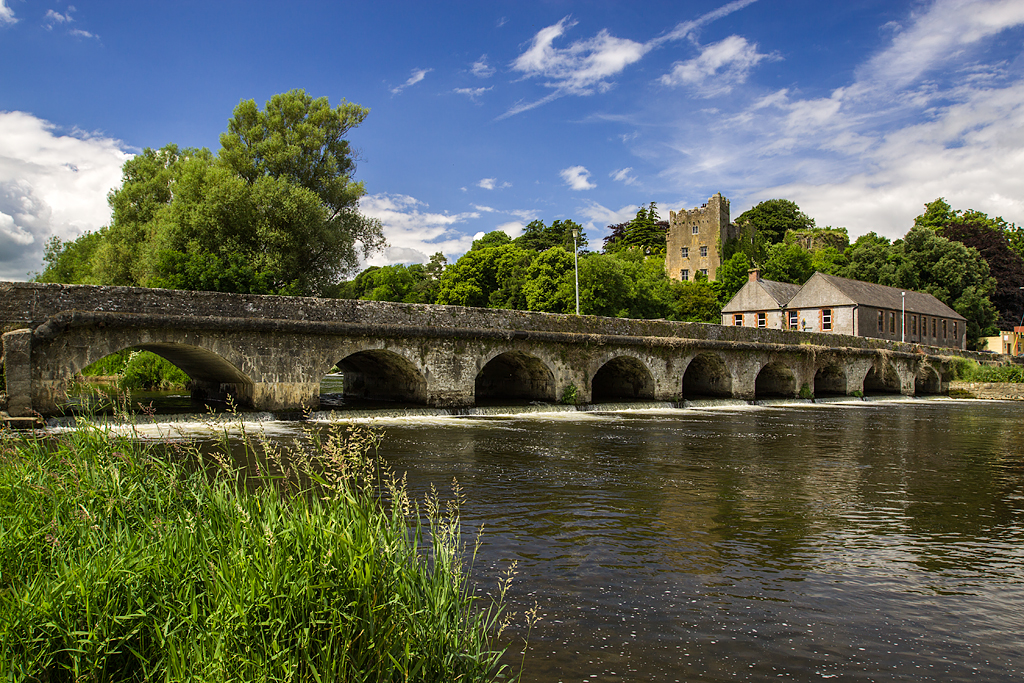
Ardfinnan Castle, Ardfinnan.

Ardfinnan Castle, is a castle built in 1185 with its sister Lismore Castle, by the river crossing at Ardfinnan (Ard Fhíonáin in Irish) in County Tipperary, Ireland. It is situated on the River Suir, four miles south of Cahir and seven miles west of Clonmel. One of the earliest Norman castles in Ireland, Ardfinnan and Lismore represent the oldest castles built by the Norman Crown in Ireland. The castle and grounds are a private residence and not open for public viewing.

The Anglo-Norman castle is positioned on a large rocky incline above a ford in the river, looking out over the Suir valley with the Knockmealdown Mountains to the south, and the Galtee Mountains to the northwest. The castle is a parallelogram in shape with a fortified entrance gateway, keep and circular 13th century preceptory at its eastern corners, while to the west are ruins of two towers and a great hall. The full extent of its structure is hidden by the trees of the Castle Wood. The castle is bound at the riverbank, bridge and road by its old watermill.

== Early history ==
The castle was built in 1185 by Prince John of England, then first Lord of Ireland, during his first expedition to Ireland. Ardfinnan and Lismore appear to be the first castles built and occupied by a member of the English Crown in Ireland. To guard the northern border of Waterford from the Gaelic kingdom of Thomond, John's father Henry II of England proposed Ardfinnan and Tybroughney on the fording of the river Suir, with Lismore on the Blackwater as key positions to erect castles, following his visit to these sites with Hugh de Lacy in 1171. He may have handed management of Ardfinnan to the Knights Templar in this year as he did with other sites downstream in Waterford and Wexford. Ardfinnan and Lismore were scenic early-Christian monastic sites on Saint Declán's 5th century pilgrim path developed into important abbeys by Saint Mochuda around 632 AD. John arrived in Waterford in April 1185 and built Ardfinnan castle on the former site of Ardfinnan Abbey, twelve miles directly north of its sister at Lismore Castle, constructed around the same time that year. Lismore Castle was also built over its former abbey. Maurice de Prendergast protected the royal castle of Ardfinnan or “Castrum de Harfinan” as its governor. John issued royal charters during his brief stay at the castle, with Hugh de Lacy as witness. One of these is signed "King of Limerick" and may be the first instance a member of the English crown titled himself a king of territory in Ireland.

Numerous raiding parties were launched from the castle into the surrounding north and western territories. In opposition to John's construction of the castles, Lismore Castle was taken by surprise in an attack by the Irish, and its governor, Robert de Barry, was slain along with his entire garrison. King of Munster Donal O'Brien, King of Connacht Rory O'Conner and King of Desmond Dermod MacCarthy, now headed for Ardfinnan. Opposite the imposing castle and on the other side of the river, O'Brien became aware that he would not be able to take it by force. Feinting retreat, he was pursued by the small garrison of knights holding Ardfinnan Castle. Having drawn them out of their stronghold, he swiftly turned back towards Ardfinnan and surrounded the now exposed knights, slaying a large portion of them and subsequently taking Ardfinnan Castle. After this and further successive defeats against the Irish Kings, John's original force of 300 men was decimated and by December 1185, he was summoned back to England by his father, leaving Hugh de Lacy at Ardfinnan.

Ardfinnan is subsequently referred to as an administrative cantred, under Philip of Worcester. Philip had been Governor of Ireland from 1184 and would subsequently replace Hugh de Lacy who died in 1186. As land was secured to the north, Philip was granted the barony of Kiltenenan in 1194, of which Cahir Castle, 4 miles north of Ardfinnan Castle, became the chief seat. Ardfinnan Castle under Norman control, an enquiry led by King John in 1206 reasserted its ownership by the English Crown. The cantred of Ardfynan (Ardfinnan) was again granted in 1215 to Philip of Worcester by Henry III, but three years later was again a possession of the English Crown. Philip's nephew, William of Worcester paid a fee of contract for the cantred of Ardfynan in 1225 to Henry III, indicating the continued royal status of Ardfinnan Castle and its surrounding cantred.

The castle had a continued presence of the monastic military order of the Knights Templar, and later the Knights Hospitaller. The Hospitaller's later credit Philip of Worcester and the king for the origin of their estate at Ardfinnan, after it passed to them from the Templars but it is not known if they existed here simultaneously. Maurice de Prendergast, as said to be the castle's first Governor was also an early Grand Prior of the Knights Hospitaller in Ireland at the Grand Priory at Kilmainham in 1203. In 1177 he gave Prendergast Castle in Wales to the Knights Hospitaller. The Templars had two watermills on the River Suir as part of their first chartered land grants in Ireland in 1172 and may be indicative of their presence at Ardfinnan for its monastic watermill and fertile land in the centre of the mountain valley. While the Templars managed this important pass into Waterford and between the ecclecsiatical centres of Cashel and Lismore, they constructed the castle's surviving round tower or Templar preceptory in the late 12th or early 13th century. The tower has been identified as a chief preceptory of the order when they first came to Ireland according to McCurtin's Annals. It's traditionally believed the Templars established the Ardfinnan woollen mills in the 12th century, alongside a fulling mill, to finish locally woven cloth around the confines of the castle while also corn milling at the ancient monastic mills on the river bank below the castle. As a vertically integrated system it would have been an early woollen mills. They had established numerous fulling mills in England for the first time in 1185, the same year Ardfinnan Castle was officially built. This would have supported earlier traditions and infrastructure brought by the monasteries and even reused a mill race and weir from the former Ardfinnan Abbey. The 13th to 16th century also saw a boom in exports of woollen Irish cloaks to mainland Europe from the port of Waterford, on which border Ardfinnan Castle defended and was directly navigable downstream via the river Suir. Dyers principally ran fulling mills in this era. A freeman (skilled artisan) named William le Teynturer (Norman English: William the Dyer) is recorded in the town of Ardfinnan in 1295.

Following dissolution of the Templars in 1312, their estates were transferred to the Hospitallers and according to the Hospitaller's register of chapter acts 1326–1339 were in possession of "the burgages in the town of Arfinan (Ardfinnan) and the church and all the tithes and appurtenances thereof" and as part of a charter agreed to a free church with appointment of a chaplain to minister daily. The scale of the economic success of the Hospitallers is evident when Ardfynan was exempted from customs and sanctions by an act of the Parliament of Ireland passed in 1449.

Henry VII dissolved the Irish Hospitallers in 1540, while later the last Grand Prior, Oswald Massingberd, tried to restore their presence at Ardfinnan c.1557-1558. Elizabeth I reinstated Henry VII's dissolution of the Catholic monastic orders and transfer of land ownership of Ardfinnan to Lord Cahir. This was immediately challenged in 1558 by the Bishop of Waterford and Lismore "for the freedom of the bishop's burgesses of Ardfinnan". An inquisition in 1588 showed that after the death of the same Bishop of Waterford and Lismore, the Manor of Ardfinnan, comprising 80 acres and a mill, was transferred to the hands of Elizabeth I.

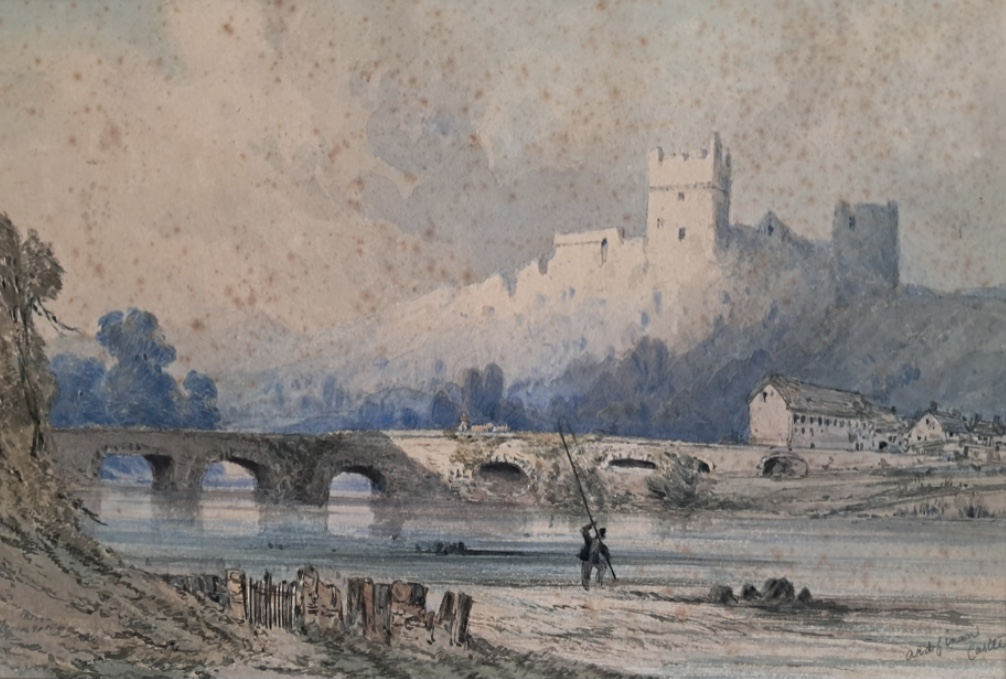
The castle depicted by 19th century romanticist John Callow.

== Cromwellian siege ==
Defending the castle for James II against the Parliamentarians with a small force of soldiers from 1649 was Captain David Fitzgibbon, "White Knight", Governor of Ardfinnan Castle. He married for the second time to Joanna Butler, widow of Richard Butler of Ardfinnan Castle, "grandson of an Earl of Ormond".

On Saturday 2 February 1650 major general Henry Ireton, who was accompanying Oliver Cromwell in his conquest of Ireland, had neither the boats nor the suitable weather conditions to make a crossing of the river Suir with his army and subsequently headed for the bridge at Ardfinnan to gain another crucial pass over the river Suir, second to the pass at Carrick-on-Suir. With a view to taking hold of the strategically placed castle which guarded this crossing from high above, he waited until around four o’clock the next morning to attempt a siege.

With cannons placed on a hill opposite the castle, Ireton bombarded its once impenetrable walls until there was a large breakthrough after about 8 shots and then proceeded to kill about thirteen of the out-guard and lost only two of his men with about ten wounded. However, another recount states that Fitzgibbon held out against a long overnight seize and lost none of his men until the walls were penetrated in the early hours of the following morning and subsequently followed by a surrender. Surrendered to the New Model Army, it would be used as a garrison throughout their time in Ireland. Guns, ammunition and other supplies arriving at Youghal would be brought over the river Blackwater at the pass at Cappoquin and then finally over the river Suir at Ardfinnan to reach the rest of the army in Tipperary. With the end of the Cromwellian campaign of Ireland, the departing Parliamentarian troops slighted Ardfinnan castle which left it partially in ruins. The castle's watermill on the bridge survived and was recorded in the Civil Survey 1654–6.

Fitzgibbon was spared his life for his honourable fight and surrender of the castle, but subsequently lost his lands at Ardfinnan and was transplanted to the west of Ireland in 1653. In 1666 he was living in County Clare. His orphaned grandson Philip Fitzgibbon would eventually return to the locality at Castle Grace (Castlegrace, Clogheen), with Phillips sons buried in Ardfinnan churchyard in the late 18th century. Rev. Graves suggested in 1876 that the earlier 14th century David Fitzgibbon, 2nd White Knight may have married into the house of Philip of Worcester, the same family who held Ardfinnan Castle and Cahir in their early history, refuting a long held claim that it was a marriage to a daughter of the Earl of Worcester.

At the time of the 1654 survey the Manor of Ardfinnan, being; castle, mill and weir, was again in possession of the Bishop of Lismore and Waterford and amounted to 5 acres, leased to a Richard Butler.

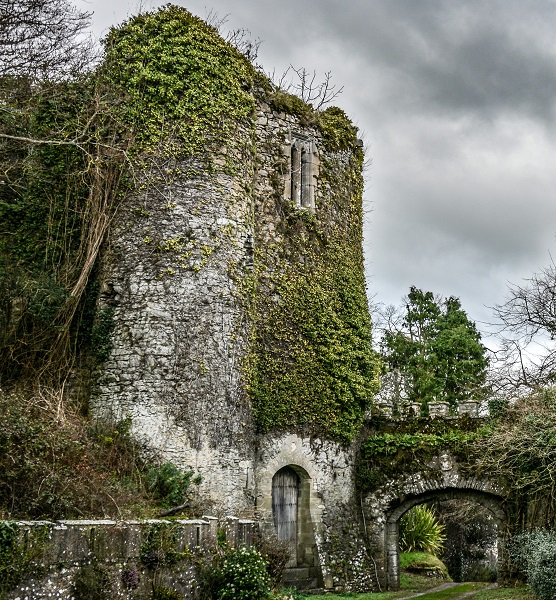
Slighted 13th-century fort, a knights preceptory. Uncommon in Ireland for its round shape.

== British Army garrison ==
In 1795 with the threat of invasion during the French Revolutionary Wars, the castle was once again occupied as a military garrison, with British Army fencible units. Despite being in ruins, the position of the castle still commanded over a chief pass on the river Suir and it would be used along with the rest of the Ardfinnan and Neddans area to hold a British Army summer training camp, with reserves ready against French invasion. Training in firing and marching were essential in forging these militia into an effective military force. Although initially established as a temporary encampment for the summer months, it became a permanent camp in March 1796 by the orders of John Pratt, 1st Marquess Camden, which amounted a force of 2,740 mainly Protestant soldiers. The camp was disbanded by 1802.

== Restoration ==
In the 18th or early 19th century, 15 acres with Ardfinnan Castle were reinstated to a descendant of Maurice de Prendergast and relative of Sir Thomas Prendergast, who were now the Prendergasts' of Newcastle. They were Protestant Ascendancy. The castle's tower-house received a restoration around 1846, with the addition of adjoining buildings and was essentially turned into a country house. Flying the Union Jack over the village and attempts at building a wall around the village green was a source of local resentment towards its new occupants. A grandson of Edmund Prendergast, Ardfinnan Castle, was the explorer Sir George Sutherland McKenzie. The last man holding the Prendergast family seat at Ardfinnan Castle was Admiral Sir Robert Prendergast, who settled in England following retirement in 1920.

John Mulcahy, a Catholic and local owner of the underlying Ardfinnan Woollen Mills, purchased the castle in 1921. Further restorations were made by 1929, during which mill workers recovered a Spanish helmet from the castle grounds dating to the 1601 Siege of Kinsale. The latest addition is the three-storey gable-ended wing, likely added during the 1930s.

The castle, bridge and adjoining watermill are the village's protected structures.
