= Peter Lambert (Gaelic footballer) =

Irish Gaelic footballer

Sport
- Sport: Gaelic football
- Position: Forward
Clubs
- Years: Club
- 1985–2006 1991–1996: Ardfinnan; Nemo Rangers
Club titles
- Tipperary titles: 1
- Munster titles: 0
Inter-county
Years	County	Apps (scores)
1988–2003	Tipperary	25 (13-73)
Inter-county titles
- Munster titles: 0
- All Stars: 0

Peter Lambert is a retired Irish sportsperson. He played Gaelic football with his local club Ardfinnan and also with Cork team Nemo Rangers, and was a member of the Tipperary senior inter-county team from 1991 until 2003. He made his last appearance for Tipperary against Donegal in July 2003 in the 2003 All-Ireland qualifiers.

Lambert played with Cork club Nemo Rangers from 1991 to 1996 and won an All-Ireland Senior Club Football Championship with them in 1994. In 2005 Lambert was player-manager as Ardfinnan won their first Tipperary Senior Football Championship since 1974 with a 1-5 to 1-4 win against Loughmore-Castleiney.

He also played with Munster in the Railway Cup in 1995, 1996, and was part of the winning team in 1999 that defeated Connacht 0-10 to 0-7 in the final.

== Honours ==
Tipperary

- McGrath Cup: 1
  - 1993

Nemo Rangers

- All-Ireland Senior Club Football Championship: 1
  - 1994
- Munster Senior Club Football Championship: 1
  - 1993
- Cork Senior Football Championship: 1
  - 1993

Ardfinnan

- Tipperary Senior Football Championships: 1
  - 2005 (Player-Manager)

Munster

- Railway Cup: 1
  - 1999
