= Ballybacon–Grange GAA =

GAA club in Tipperary, Ireland

Ballybacon–Grange
- Baile Bhéacáin–An Ghráinseach
- Founded: 1927
- County: Tipperary
- Colours: Green and gold
- Grounds: Goatenbridge
- Coordinates: 52°16′24.96″N 7°52′16.15″W

Playing kits
Standard colours

Ballybacon–Grange GAA is a Gaelic Athletic Association club located in the areas of Goatenbridge and Ardfinnan in County Tipperary, Ireland. The club competes in hurling in the Intermediate competitions at county level and in the South division of Tipperary GAA. The club has a fraternal co-existence with Ardfinnan Gaelic Football Club which is also affiliated to the GAA. As a consequence, some club hurlers also play football with Ardfinnan GAA.

== Hurling ==
In 2018, the club won its 13th South Tipperary Intermediate Hurling Championship after a four-point win against Carrick Davins in the final.

On 4 November 2017, they won the Tipperary Junior 'A' Hurling Championship after a 0–19 to 1–11 win against Toomevara, it was their first ever adult county title. On 12 November 2017, Ballybacon–Grange reached the 2017 Munster Club Junior Hurling Championship final after a 1–11 to 0–9 win against St Catherine's from Cork in the semi-final in Ardfinnan. They had earlier defeated Kenmare in the quarter-final by 5–24 to 1–4. In the final on 3 December 2017, they faced Ardmore in Mallow. They lost the final on a 3–11 to 2–8 scoreline in a match where four players were sent off, three from Ardmore.

== Honours ==
- South Tipperary Senior Hurling Championship (1)
  - 1968
- South Tipperary Intermediate Hurling Championship (14)
  - 1966, 1976, 1980, 1998, 1999, 2000, 2001, 2003, 2004, 2007, 2012, 2013 2018, 2019
- Tipperary Junior A Hurling Championship (1)
  - 2017
- South Tipperary Junior 'A' Hurling Championship (3)
  - 1962, 2016, 2017
- South Tipperary Junior 'B' Hurling Championship (3)
  - 1992 2001 2019
- South Tipperary Under-21 'A' Hurling Championship (5)
  - 1961, 1963, 1968, 1984 1995
- South Tipperary Under-21 'B' Hurling Championship (3)
  - 1992, 2002, 2010
- South Tipperary Minor 'A' Hurling Championship (5)
  - 1945, 1961, 1991, 1992, 2009
- South Tipperary Minor 'B' Hurling Championship (6)
  - 1984 1989, 1994, 2001, 2012, 2013

== Notable players ==
- Michael "Babs" Keating: Winner All-Ireland Senior Hurling Championship: 1964 and 1971 as a player, and 1989 and 1991 as manager.
- Brendan Cummins: Winner All-Ireland Senior Hurling Championship: 2001 and 2010
- Michael Phelan

== Camogie ==
Ballybacon–Grange formed a juvenile camogie club in 2013.
