= Michael Phelan (Gaelic footballer) =

Irish Gaelic footballer and hurler

Personal information
- Native name: Mícheál Ó Faoileáin (Irish)
- Born: 1982 (age 43–44) Ardfinnan, County Tipperary, Ireland

Sport
- Sport: Gaelic football
- Position: Right wing-back
Club
- Years: Club
- Ardfinnan
Club titles
- Tipperary titles: 1
Inter-county*
Years	County	Apps (scores)
2006-2009	Tipperary	4 (0-00)
Inter-county titles
- Munster titles: 0
- All-Irelands: 0
- NFL: 0
- All Stars: 0
- *Inter County team apps and scores correct as of 00:54, 4 August 2015.

Michael Phelan (born 1982) is an Irish Gaelic footballer who played as a right wing-back for the Tipperary senior team.

Born in Ardfinnan, County Tipperary, Phelan first arrived on the inter-county scene at the age of seventeen when he first linked up with the Tipperary minor team before later joining the under-21 side. He made his senior debut during the 2006 championship. Phelan subsequently became a regular member of the starting fifteen.

At club level Phelan is a one-time championship medallist with Ardfinnan. He also plays hurling with Ballybacon–Grange.

Phelan retired from inter-county football following the conclusion of the 2009 championship.

== Honours ==
=== Player ===
Ardfinnan

- Tipperary Senior Football Championship (1): 2005

Sporting positions
Preceded by Declan Browne	Tipperary Senior Football Captain; 2006	Succeeded by Colin Morrissey
