= Michael Cronin (cricketer) =

English cricketer

Michael Richard Cronin (born 21 October 1941) is a retired English cricketer. He was a left-handed batsman and right-arm off-break bowler who played for Shropshire. He was born in Bromyard, Herefordshire and educated at the Lady Hawkins Grammar School in Kington.

Cronin, who represented Shropshire in the Minor Counties Championship in 1988 and 1989, made a single List A appearance for the team, in the 1992 NatWest Trophy, while playing at club level for Newport in that county. From the tailend, he scored a single run, and took one wicket.

He was also a footballer. He had played professionally for Hereford United and in county matches for Herefordshire.
