= Noel Lane (Tipperary hurler) =

Irish hurler

Personal information
- Native name: Nollaig Ó Laighin (Irish)
- Born: 1943 (age 82–83) Lorrha, County Tipperary, Ireland

Sport
- Sport: Hurling
- Position: Rignt corner-back
Club
- Years: Club
- 1960s–1970s: Lorrha–Dorrha
Inter-county
- Years: County
- 1964–1972: Tipperary
Inter-county titles
- Munster titles: 1
- All-Irelands: 0
- NHL: 0
- All Stars: 0

Noel Lane (born 1943) is an Irish former hurler who played as a right corner-back at senior level for the Tipperary county team.

Lane made his first appearance for the team during the 1964 championship but did not become a semi-regular player until the end of the decade. During that time he won one All-Ireland winner's medal as a non-playing substitute and one Munster winner's medal.

At club level, Lane had a successful career with Lorrha–Dorrha. He also lined out with Munster in the inter-provincial championship.
