= 2025 All-Ireland Under-20 Hurling Championship Final =

- Event: 2025 All-Ireland Under-20 Hurling Championship
Tipperay	Kilkenny
3-19	1-16
- Date: 31 May 2025
- Venue: Nowlan Park, Kilkenny
- Referee: S. Hynes (Galway)
- Attendance: 14,455
- Weather: Sunny

The 2025 All-Ireland Under-20 Hurling Championship final was a hurling match that was played on 31 May to determine the winners of the 2025 All-Ireland Under-20 Hurling Championship, the 62nd season of the All-Ireland Under-20 Hurling Championship, a tournament organised by the Gaelic Athletic Association for the champion teams of Leinster and Munster.

The final was contested by Tipperary of Munster and Kilkenny of Leinster and was shown live on TG4. It was the 10th meeting between the two teams in the final overall and a first meeting in the final in 17 years.

Tipperary managed by Brendan Cummins and captained by Sam O'Farrell won the game on a 3-19 to 1-6 scoreline to claim their 12th championship title overall and a first title in six years.

== Match ==
=== Details ===
31 May 2025
15:00

Tipperary	3-19 - 1-16	Kilkenny
Paddy McCormack 2-1, Conor Martin 1-4, Darragh McCarthy 0-5 (5fs), Oisín O’Donoghue 0-3 (1s/l), Sam O’Farrell, Adam Daly, Cathal English 0-2 each.	Report; Highlights	Michael Brennan 0-11 (8fs), Marty Murphy 1-2, Jeff Neary, Ed McDermott, Greg Kelly 0-1 each.

Nowlan Park
Attendance: 14,455
Referee: S. Hynes (Galway)
