= Ken Hogan =

Tipperary hurler (born 1963)

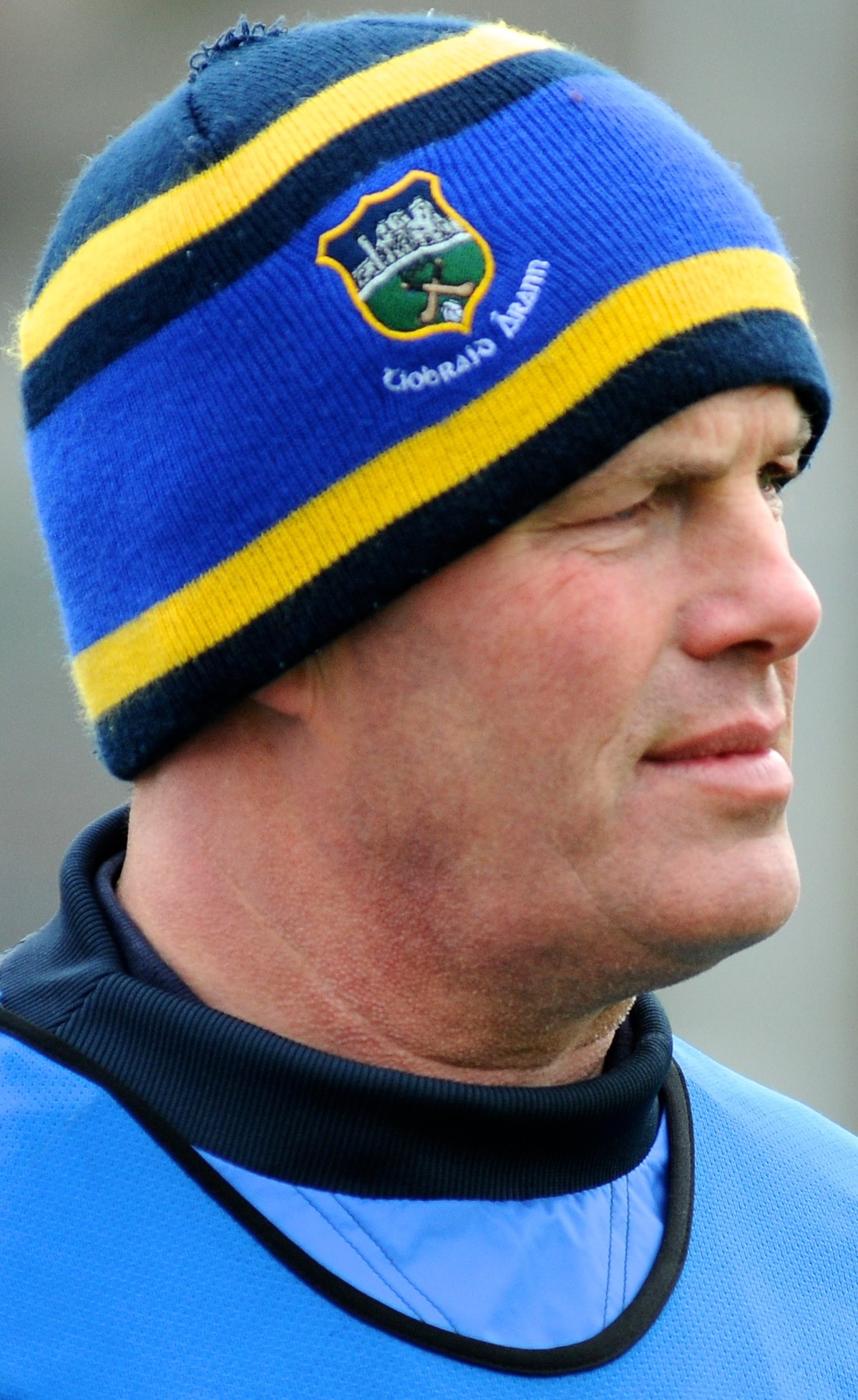
- Ken Hogan patrolling the sideline in a National Hurling League game against Galway in 2013

Personal information
- Native name: Séamus Cionnaith Ó hÓgain (Irish)
- Nickname: Killer
- Born: 1 May 1963 (age 63) Lorrha, County Tipperary, Ireland
- Occupation: Garda Síochána
- Height: 6 ft 2 in (188 cm)

Sport
- Sport: Hurling
- Position: Goalkeeper
Club
- Years: Club
- Lorrha–Dorrha
Inter-county*
Years	County	Apps (scores)
1987–1993	Tipperary	25 (0–00)
Inter-county titles
- Munster titles: 5
- All-Irelands: 2
- NHL: 1
- All Stars: 1
- *Inter County team apps and scores correct as of 17:26, 8 March 2014.

James Kenneth Hogan (born 1 May 1963) is an Irish former hurler who played as a goalkeeper at senior level for the Tipperary county team.

Born in Lorrha, County Tipperary, Hogan first played competitive hurling whilst at school at the Presentation College, Birr. He arrived on the inter-county scene at the age of seventeen when he first linked up with the Tipperary minor team, before later joining the under-21 team. He joined the senior team during the 1986 championship. Hogan went on to win two All-Ireland medals, five Munster medals and one National Hurling League medal. He was an All-Ireland runner-up on one occasion.

As a member of the Munster inter-provincial team on a number of occasions throughout his career, however, Hogan never won a Railway Cup medal. At club level he played with Lorrha-Dorrha.

Throughout his career Hayes made 20 championship appearances for Tipperary. His retirement came following the conclusion of the 1993 championship.

In retirement from playing, Hogan became involved in team management and coaching. He has served as manager of the Tipperary senior and under-21 teams, as well as a number of club teams.

== Early life ==
From a young age Ken Hogan showed great skill at the game of hurling. He was educated at the local national school and later studied at the Presentation College in Birr, County Offaly. Here Hogan won a Leinster colleges' title.

== Playing career ==
=== Club ===
Hogan began playing hurling with his local club, Lorrha–Dorrha, at a young age. He won two under-14 'B' championship medals in 1976 and 1977 with his club. Hogan subsequently won a North Tipperary under-21 'B' medal in 1983. He also won two North Tipperary senior hurling championship medals, captaining his side to the title in 1989.

=== Minor and under-21 ===
Hogan joined the Tipperary inter-county minor panel in 1980. That year he had his first major success when he captured a Munster Minor Hurling Championship title. He later lined out in the minor championship decider with Wexford providing the opposition. Tipp had a 2–15 to 1–10 win, giving Hogan an All-Ireland Minor Hurling Championship medal.

Hogan later joined the Tipperary under-21 panel, winning a Munster title at this level in 1983. He later lined out in the All-Ireland final against Galway. A final score of 0–12 to 1–9 in Galway's favour meant that Hogan ended up on the losing side. In 1984 he added a second consecutive Munster under-21 title to his collection before later lining out in a second consecutive All-Ireland final. Kilkenny were the opponents on that occasion, but Tipp were defeated again by 1–12 to 0–11. It was Hogan's last year with the county under-21 team.

=== Senior ===
Hogan subsequently joined the Tipperary senior panel and made his debut in 1987. Tipperary won its first Munster title in 16 years following a draw and a replay with Cork in FitzGerald Stadium, Killarney . In the subsequent All-Ireland semi-final Galway defeated Tipperary 3–20 to 2–17.

In 1988 Hogan added a National Hurling League medal to his collection. He later captured his second Munster medal following another victory over Cork. A subsequent defeat of Antrim allowed Tipp to advance to the All-Ireland final against Galway. Noel Lane scored a goal for Galway while Nicky English sent a late penalty over the bar for a point. A 1–15 to 0–14 score line resulted in victory for Galway.

In 1989, Hogan won his third provincial title in-a-row after a 0–26 to 2–8 win over Waterford. For the third time in as many years Tipp faced Galway in the All-Ireland series, but on this occasion the men from the West were without Tony Keady. In the game Tipp finally triumphed over Galway. Antrim, the surprise winners of the other semi-final, provided the opposition in the subsequent All-Ireland final. It was only the second appearance of an Ulster team in the championship decider. Tipperary however won convincingly with a 4–24 to 3–9 win. Tipp thus preserved their record of being the only team to win an All-Ireland title in every decade in GAA history. It was Hogan's first senior All-Ireland medal.

In 1990 Tipperary surrendered their Munster crown to Cork for the first time in four years. This defeat followed Babs Keating's infamous remark about Cork that "donkeys don't win derbies".

Tipp returned in 1991 and defeated Cork in a Munster final replay giving Hogan his fourth provincial medal. The subsequent All-Ireland final saw Tipp take on Kilkenny for the first time in twenty years. A goal by Michael Cleary in the first-half gave Tipp a lead which they never surrendered. A 1–16 to 0–15 victory allowed Hogan to capture his second All-Ireland medal in three years.

1992 saw Tipp exit the championship at an early stage, however, the team bounced back for one last hurrah in 1993. That year Hogan added a fifth Munster medal to his collection as Tipp beat Clare by 3–27 to 2–12. The subsequent All-Ireland semi-final saw Tipp renew their rivalry with Galway; however, on this occasion Galway won. This defeat brought the curtain down on Tipp's great revival while also being an end to Hogan's inter-county career.

== Managerial career ==
Ken Hogan
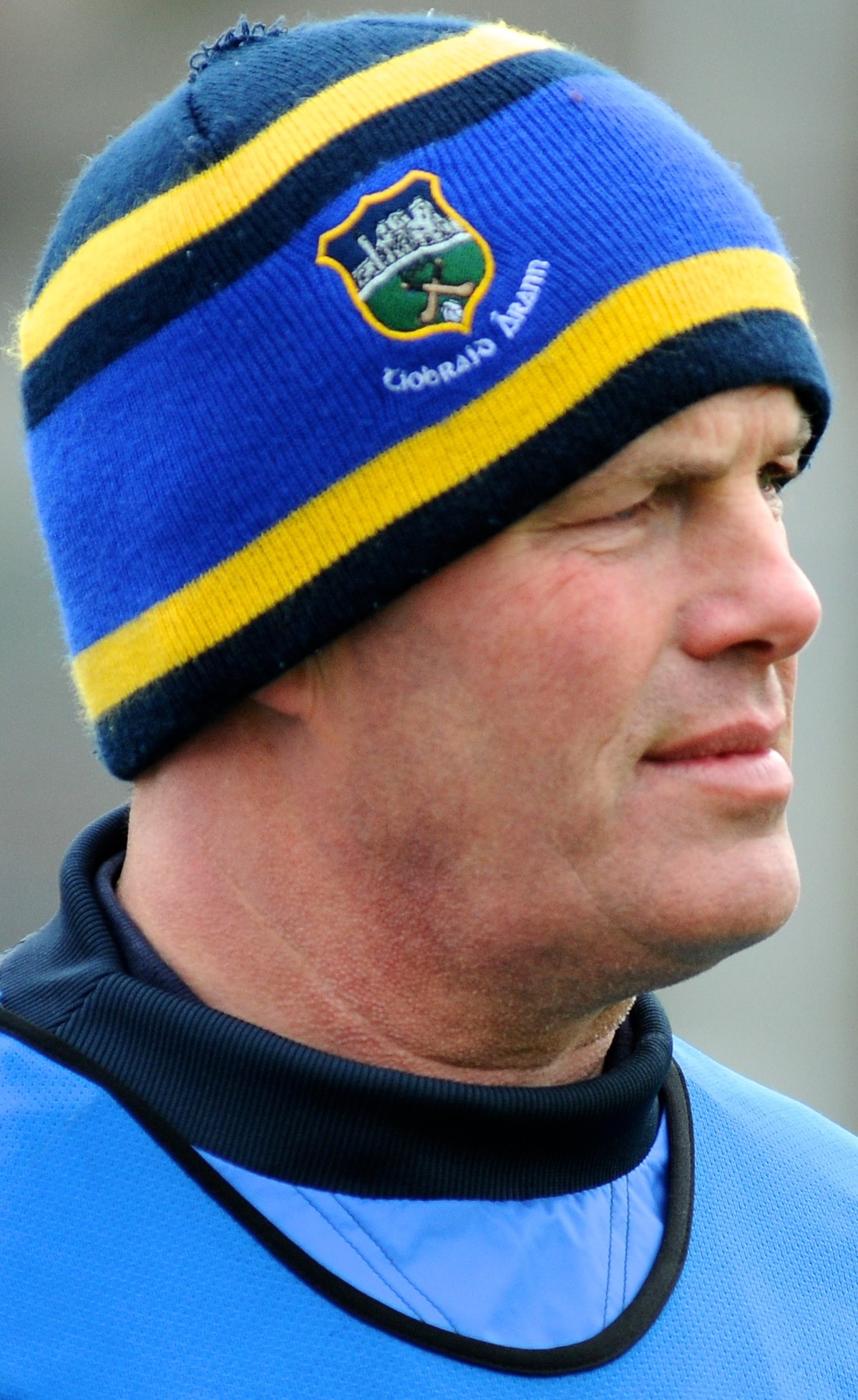

Sport
Inter-county management
- Years: Team
- 2003–2005: Tipperary

=== Tipperary Senior ===
Hogan maintained an interest in hurling following his retirement as a player. He served as a selector under Fr Tom Fogarty in the mid-1990s when Fogarty was Tipperary manager. He later held the same position under Nicky English in the early 2000s. Hogan succeeded Michael Doyle as manager of the Tipperary senior hurling team in 2003. He served as manager for two seasons but, apart from a Munster final appearance in 2005, had little success and left in 2005.

=== Tipperary Under-21 ===
On 11 September 2010, Tipperary Under-21 hurlers, managed by Hogan, won the All Ireland Under-21 title by defeating Galway by 5–22 to 0–12 at Semple Stadium. Hogan managed the Under-21 team from 2009 until stepping down in 2013.

== Honours ==
=== Tipperary ===
- All-Ireland Senior Hurling Championship (2)
  - 1989, 1991; runner-up 1988
- Munster Senior Hurling Championship (5)
  - 1987, 1988, 1989, 1991, 1993; runner-up 1990
- National Hurling League (1)
  - 1987–1988; runner-up 1988–1989
- All-Ireland Under-21 Hurling Championship
  - runner-up 1983, 1984
- Munster Under-21 Hurling Championship (2)
  - 1983, 1984
- All-Ireland Minor Hurling Championship (1)
  - 1980
- Munster Minor Hurling Championship (1)
  - 1980; runner-up 1981

Achievements
Preceded by John Minogue (Clare)	All-Ireland Under-21 HC winning manager 2010	Succeeded by Anthony Cunningham (Galway)
Sporting positions
Preceded by Michael Doyle	Tipperary Senior Hurling Manager; 2003–2005	Succeeded by Babs Keating
Preceded by Declan Carr	Tipperary Under-21 Hurling Manager; 2009–2013	Succeeded by T. J. Connolly
