= Lorrha =

Village in County Tipperary, Ireland

Lorrha Lothra
- Village
- Location in Ireland
- Coordinates: 53°05′32″N 8°07′25″W
- Country: Ireland
- Province: Munster
- County: County Tipperary
- Time zone: UTC+0 (WET)
  - Summer (DST): UTC-1 (IST (WEST))
- Website: www.lorrhadorrha.ie

Lorrha (from Irish: Lothra) is a small village at the northern tip of County Tipperary, Ireland. Ledewich described village as 'Larah' which is the common name for the talk-motes, mote hills etc. P. Dixon Hardy M.R.I.A. describes it as 'Loragh'

It is located on a minor road between the R489 Birr to Portumna road and the N65 Nenagh to Portumna road about five kilometres east of the point where the River Shannon enters Lough Derg.

It is also the name of a townland and a civil parish in the historical barony of Ormond Lower. The civil parish borders Portumna in County Galway and Birr in County Offaly.

== History ==
In 843 a Norse expedition led by Turgesius raided Lorrha and the neighbouring settlement of Terryglass. 'Cromwell certainly visited Lorrha, for tradition records him to have committed many sacrilegious acts in the English church-yards; as a proof of which, the remains of Broken crosses are still to be seen; tradition also tells us that the abbey bell was, at the same time, transferred to a neighbouring gentleman's house for security, where its silver tongue was exchanged for one of baser metal. That the abbey was taken possession of and burned, is likewise probable, as the east end, before it became overgrown with ivy, showed several marks of fire. it certainly must have been unroofed before Cromwell's time, for had it had been laid waste by him, tradition would not have so soon forgotten the date of its overthrow.'

Close to a historic crossing point of the River Shannon, the area has a long history of bridges and ferry crossings. The present Portumna bridge dates from 1911 (opening section replaced October 2008)

=== Ecclesiastic Ruins and Buildings ===
Lorrha has a rich ecclesiastical history evidenced by the ruins and active religious buildings within the village. The Roman Catholic Church of St. Ruadhan (c. 1912),

=== Dominican Friary ===
At the south of the village are the remains of a Dominican Friary founded in the 13th century by Walter de Burgh, Earl of Ulster. The remains consist of: 'It is an oblong uncompact pile of a building, measuring one hundred and twenty feet by twenty four within the walls, and the side walls about twenty-six feet in height. The windows are well proportioned and have stone mullions, which branch out into two parts at top. over most of them are partly flat arches, badly executed, but yet capable of supporting a weight which, perhaps the graceful ones beneath would not be sufficient to bear up. The East Gable is thrown down nearly to the foundation, which has greatly injured the beauty of the building, as the great window which it contained was wrought with elegance and taste. The West Gable, in which a handsome gothic window, is still entire, being raised to a considerable height above the proportion of the roof. It served for a belfry, for which purpose it still answers. Within about three feet of the top of the side walls, and continued for half the length of the entire building are projecting stones placed at equal distances asunder in which bellcasts were made in order that the water might descend without having any connection with the walls. The building which was continued above these dripstones served as a shield or break work to persons standing on the roof. There were formerly three ways of entrance into the abbey; one near the est end, facing the north, which is now built up; another in the west gable most likely to have been the principal; and the third fronting the south, but near the west end, the arched stones of which are picked out. At the left hand, just as you enter the abbey, by the last mentioned doorway, is a niche in the wall where will a short time ago, there was to be seen a wooden effigy of St. Ruaden, or Ruan, the founder. Of this image, nothing now remains but the head which is thrown about. As you pass towards the east end, you see the remains of a cross wall, which divided the building into nearly two equal parts; the east of which has the windows facing the south, and those of the west opposite the north, except two which look to the south. There are a great number of stone tablets inserted in the walls, most of which are highly ornamented, and bear Latin inscriptions. On one of these, which is of highly polished marble, is the coat of arms of the Mac Egan family.'

=== Site of St Ruadhan's Church ===
To the east of the village stands the Church of Ireland on the site of St. Ruadhan's church which was built c. 1000 AD and was itself built on the site of St. Ruadhan's Abbey, founded in the 6th century. Remains of two 8th-century high crosses stand in the churchyard.

=== Lorrha Abbey ===
The Augustinian Abbey founded in the 12th century by the Order of Canons Regular stands nearby. The carved head over the door is thought to represent the wife of Walter De Burgh. Water for the monastic settlement was supplied from St. Ruadhan's well located south of the road that passes the present Church of Ireland cemetery.

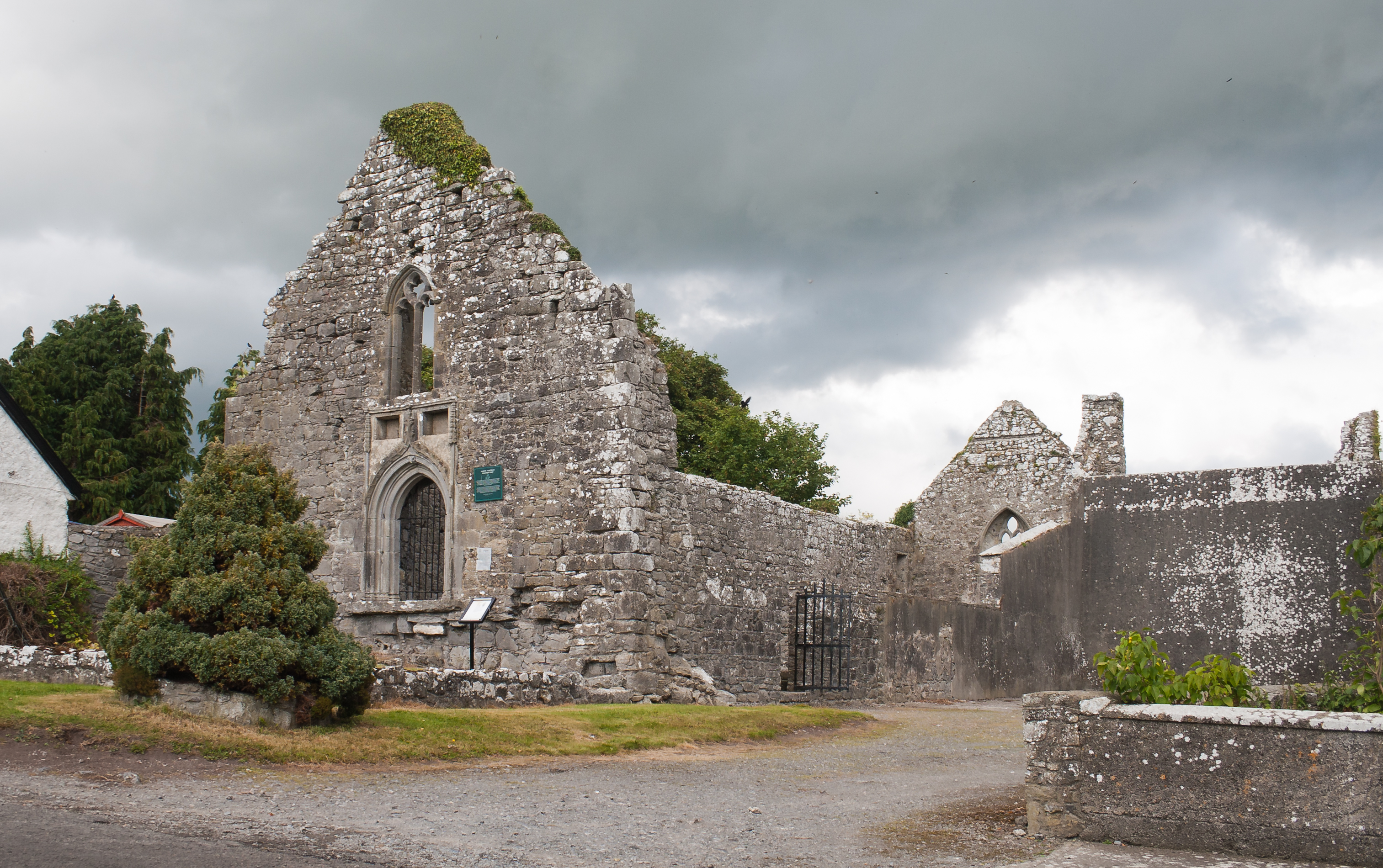
Lorrha Priory of St. Ruadhan

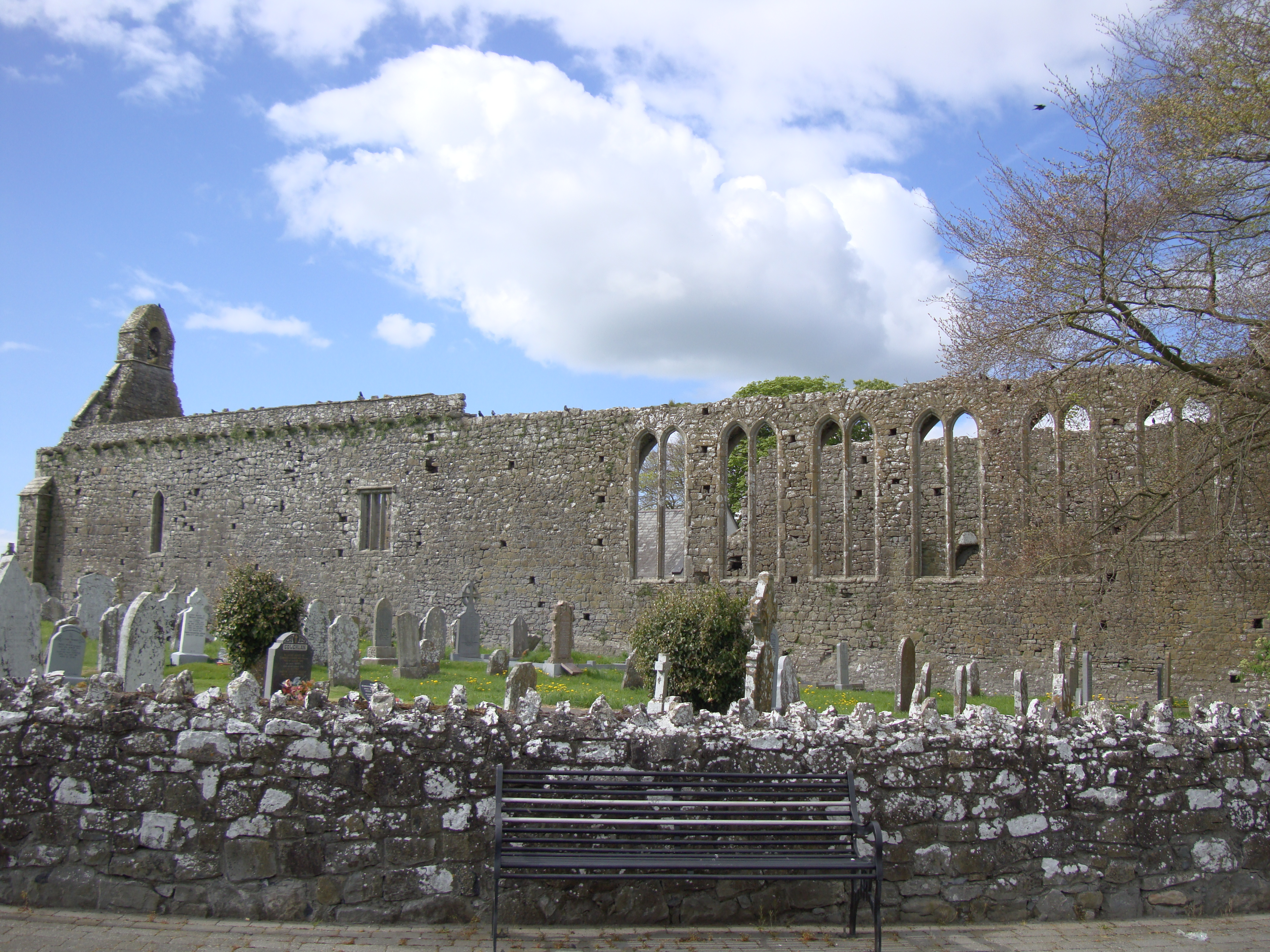
Lorrha Friary

=== Lorrha Castle ===
At the north side, and within a few paces of the abbey, is a ruinous old building, so much overgrown with ivy, that there is scarcely any part of the walls perceptible. from its similarity to most other military buildings, I am led to think that it is the ruins of a castle, notwithstanding the general opinion that it was an appendage to the abbey.

The Lorrha Missal, a translation of the Latin and Gaelic Missal was transcribed at Lorrha in the 9th century. It is now commonly known as the Stowe Missal.

=== Annalstic references ===
See Annals of Inisfallen

- AI707.2 Colmán, abbot of Lothra, rested.
- AI747a.1 Kl. Repose of Dúngal, abbot of Lothra. The slaying of Aed Dub.
- AI780.1 Kl. Repose of Ailill, abbot of Lothra.
- AI809.1 Kl. Coibdenach the learned, abbot of Lothra, [rested].
- AI1015.10 The vacating of Imlech Ibuir, and the invasion of Lothra.

== Notable buildings ==
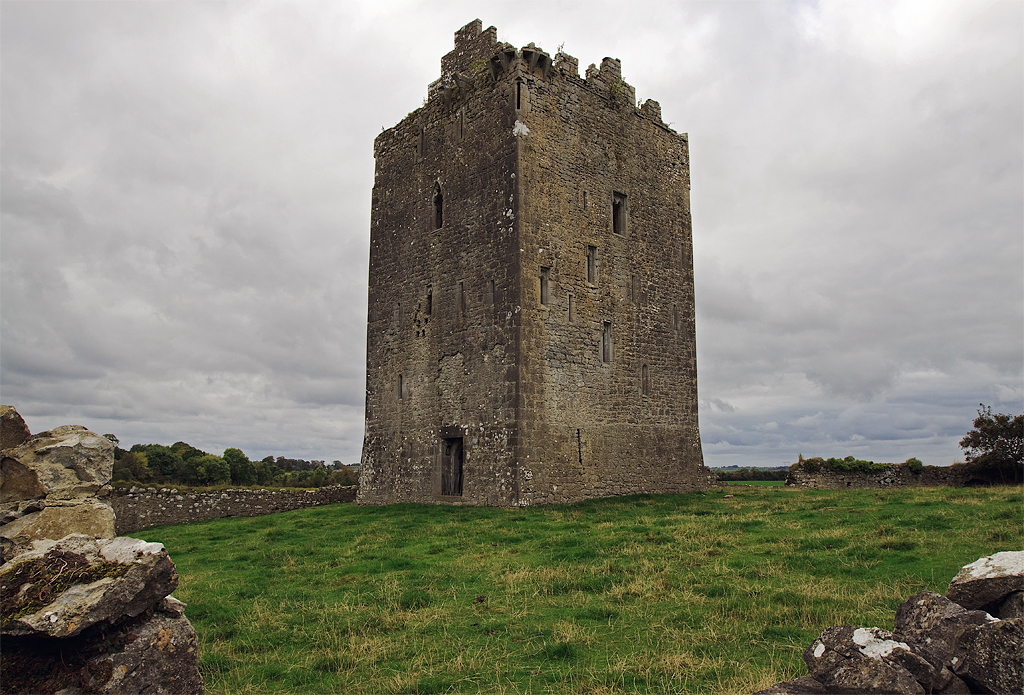
Lackeen Castle

- Lackeen Castle, A Kennedy stronghold occasionally open to the public (built 12th century, rebuilt 16th century). It was here that the Lorrha Missal was rediscovered inside a stone wall in the 18th century.
- Redwood Castle. Norman castle (built c. 1200).
- Abbeville. Small country house (built c. 1840 adjoining earlier structure).
- The Church of Ireland features a stained glass window from the An Túr Gloine studio by Michael Healy depicting The Holy Women at the Tomb (1918).

== Religion ==
For those residents of a Christian faith, Lorrha has both an active Roman Catholic and Anglican church. Lorrha is an ecclesiastical parish in the Roman Catholic Diocese of Killaloe.

== Sport and recreation ==
Lorrha–Dorrha is the local GAA sports club. Several well-known players have had Lorrha–Dorrha connections, see notable people below.

Lorrha is on the route of the Ormond Way which forms part of the Beara-Breifne Way, a long-distance walking and cycling trail from the Beara Peninsula in County Cork to Blacklion in County Cavan.

== Representation ==
Lorrha East and Lorrha West are both in the Dáil constituency of Offaly which incorporates 24 electoral divisions that were previously in the Tipperary North Dáil constituency.

== Notable people ==
- Ruadán mac Fergusa Birn, 6th-century founder and first abbot of the monastery of Lorrha.
- Cú Connacht mac Dundach, King of Síol Anmchadha, (died 1006 near Lorrha)
- Martin O'Meara VC (born 1882 in Sharragh, Lorrha –1935), recipient of the Victoria Cross
- Martin Charles Reddington (1919–2015), Irish sportsperson who played hurling for Lorrha-Dorrha GAA.
- Liam King (born 1940 in Lorrha) retired Irish sportsperson
- John McIntyre (born 1961 in Lorrha) Irish hurling manager and former player
- James Kenneth Hogan (born 1963 in Lorrha), current Irish hurling manager and former player
- Patrick (Bonner) Maher (born 1989), current Irish sportsperson playing on the Tipperary senior hurling team.

== See also ==
- List of civil parishes of County Tipperary
- List of towns and villages in Ireland
- Lorrha-Dorrha GAA
