= Ardfinnan =

Village in County Tipperary, Ireland

Ardfinnan Ard Fhíonáin
- Village
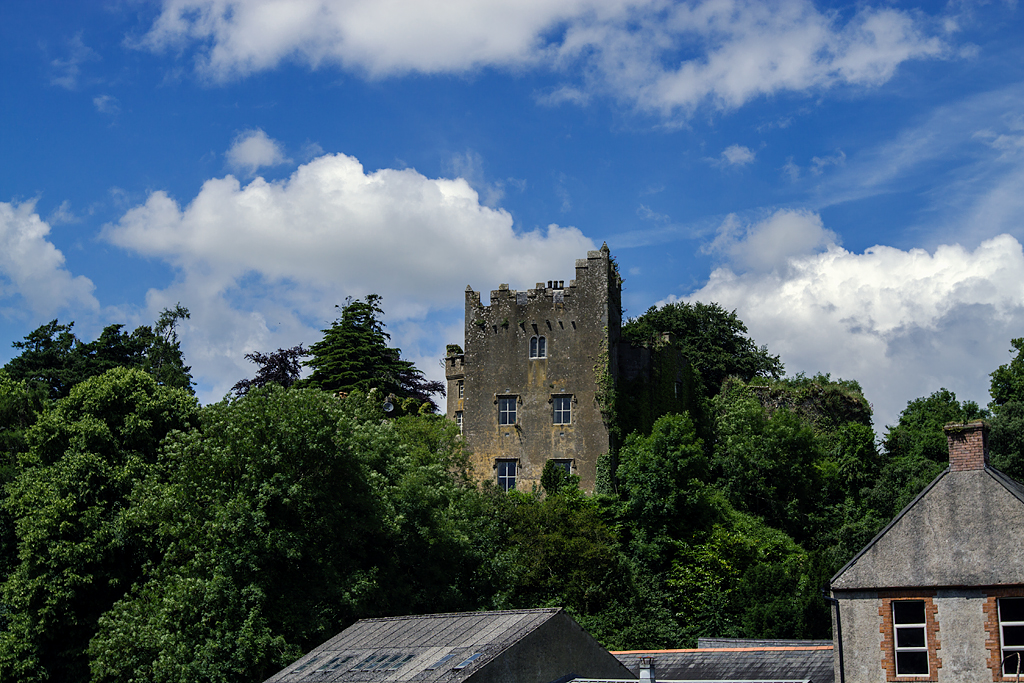
- Ardfinnan Castle

- Location in Ireland
- Coordinates: 52°18′35″N 7°53′07″W
- Country: Ireland
- Province: Munster
- County: Tipperary
- Elevation: 55 m (180 ft)

Population (2022)
  - Total: 978
- Time zone: UTC+0 (WET)
  - Summer (DST): UTC-1 (IST (WEST))
- Irish Grid Reference: S077174

Ardfinnan (Irish: Ard Fhíonáin, meaning 'High place of Finnian') is a village in County Tipperary in Ireland. It is situated on the River Suir and R665 regional road. The Catholic parish of Ardfinnan is made up of three areas: Ardfinnan, Ballybacon, and Grange. Ardfinnan is also a civil parish in the ancient barony of Iffa and Offa West. The village is located 14 km (9 mi) from the town of Clonmel and 10 km (6 mi) from Cahir via the R670 road. As of 2022, the village had a population of 978 people.

== History ==
=== Saint Declán ===
Saint Declán journeyed through here in the early 5th century on his famous early-christian pilgrimage route from his monastery at Ardmore to Cashel, “Saint Declan’s Way”. The ford in the Suir where the bridge is now was one of the most important waypoints for pilgrims. 19th century sources claimed the original name of the place was Druim-abhradh, meaning ridge-edge or ridge-brow.

=== Saint Finnian ===
It is traditionally believed that Saint Fíonán Lobhar (or Finnian the Leper) founded an abbey, with a leper colony here in the 6th century, high up behind the site of the now present castle, known as Ard Brennuin and later Ard Finnan in his namesake, where the village gets its name. The 10th-century text Litany of Irish Saints II refers to it as “de muntir Fhinnio i nAird Brendomnaig” and closely means “monastery of Finnian on the hill of Brennuin”. Saint Finnian's Church of Ireland church and graveyard sits on what is believed to be his monastic settlement.

=== Saint Carthage of Lismore ===
In c.631 AD the exiled Saint Carthage and his large cohort of 800 monks, plus laity, travelled south in search of refuge, arriving at Ard Breanuinn on the bank of the river Suir. They were confronted by King Maolochtair of the Déisi and his noblemen to refute the ownership of the land. Afterwards, the King's wife (a daughter of the King of Munster) had a dream which she recalled to him upon waking:

"a flock of very beautiful birds flying above her head and one bird was more beautiful and larger than the rest. The other birds followed this one and it nestled in the king's bosom". The King replied: "Woman you have dreamed a good dream and soon it will be realised; the flock of birds you have seen is Mochuda (Saint Carthage)" "with his monks coming from Rahen and the most distinguished bird is Mochuda himself. And the settling in my bosom means that the place of his resurrection will be in my territory. Many blessings will come to us and our territory through him."

King Maolochtair met Saint Carthage again to make peace and granted him this land to establish the settlement of Ardfinnan around Ardfinnan Abbey. A similar place further south on the pilgrim path was also granted, considering the large number of monks, from which grew Lismore around his great centre of western learning Lismore Abbey.

In 908, King of Munster Cormac mac Cuilennáin bequeathed one ounce of gold, one ounce of silver, his horses, armour and sword to Ardfinnan Abbey. The death of Giola, Prior of Ardfinnan, is recorded in 1085. It was said that when Lismore Abbey was sacked by Cambro-Normans during the Norman Invasion of Ireland in 1178, the monks brought all the "Sacred Vessels with them" to Ardfinnan. Ardfinnan Abbey was also said to be fled, then plundered and burnt in 1178 but Henry II was historically recorded to visit here in 1171 when he also transferred monastic lands to the Knights Templar. Both abbeys of Ardfinnan and Lismore were replaced by Norman sister castles in 1185. Ardfinnan Abbey possibly reformed 4 miles north at Caher Abbey in Cahir.

A Carmelite abbey was later built on the opposite side of the river valley, known as Lady's Abbey, of which its ruin is still extant after it was destroyed during the English Reformation. There was also a monastery for Franciscan Friars, Third Order Regular.

=== Ardfinnan Castle ===
A prominent feature of the village is the Anglo-Norman Ardfinnan Castle, built with its sister Lismore Castle by Prince John of England in 1185. It was likely built over and with the masonry of Ardfinnan Abbey. As Lord of Ireland, John issued royal charters from the castle during his brief stay there. The castle and surrounding manor was the site of numerous battles defending the border of Waterford. The 14 arch bridge was started soon after the castle was completed. The castle's list of former owners include the Knights Templar and Hospitaller. The castle is now a private home and is not open to the public.

The castle, bridge and adjoining watermill are the village's protected structures.

=== Spital-land ===
The Knights Hospitaller had a late medieval hospital in the area known as Spital-land in the village. This would have been a hospice and inn for pilgrims, sick and elderly.

=== Fairy Fort ===
A 50 meter diameter fairyfort exists at the crest of the highest point in Ardfinnan, in the Spital-land townland.

== Economy ==
=== Mills ===
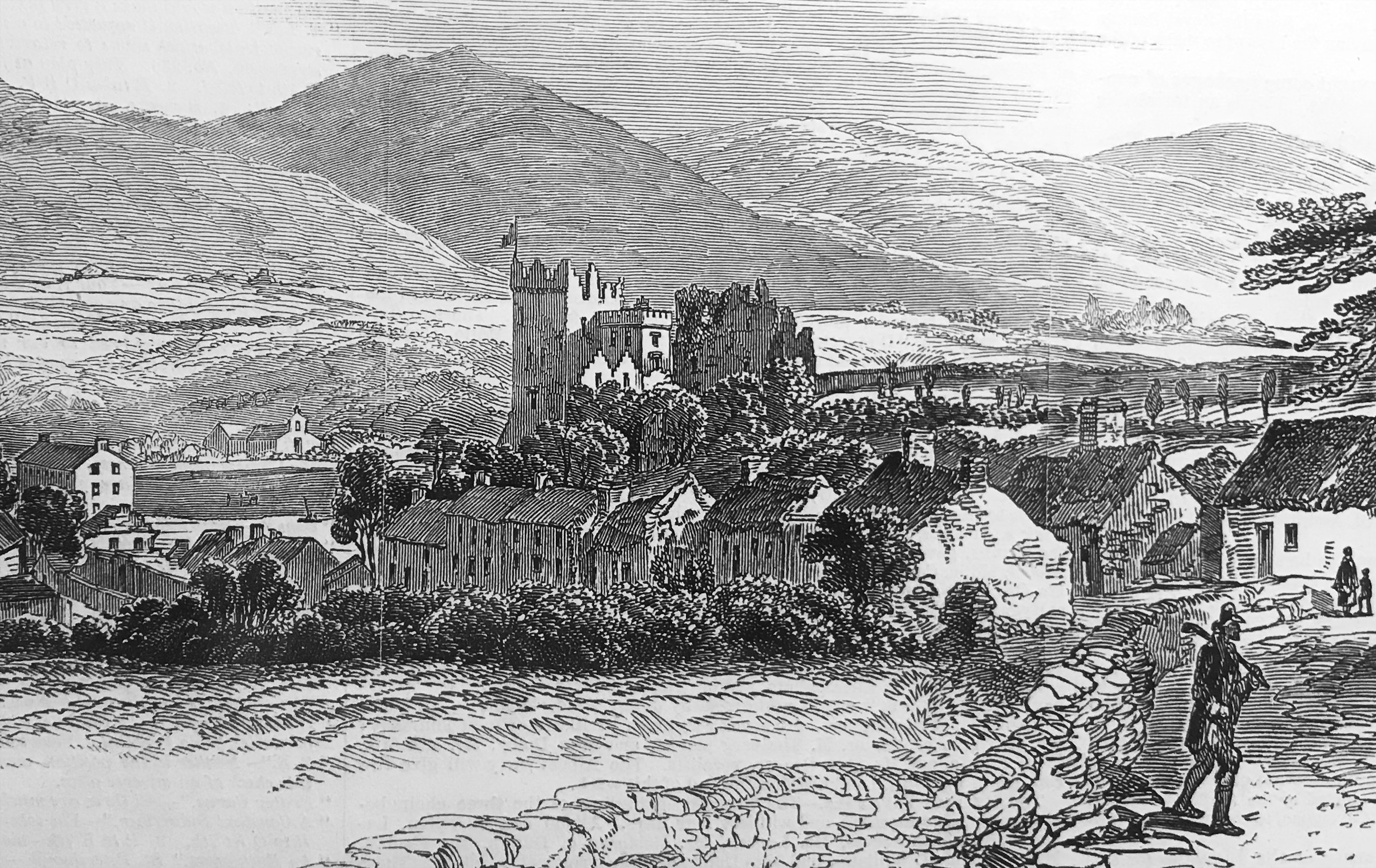
Ardfinnan Castle (centre) and five-story watermill (left) from Factory Hill Road, the now-demolished cottages were known for hand-weaving and spinning, c.1847.

Mulcahy, Redmond & Co. was established in the 19th century at the Ardfinnan woollen mills or "woollen factory" at the watermill of Ardfinnan Castle, making Ardfinnan internationally known in tailoring houses. The woollen mills became a leading firm in Irish textiles and was of great benefit to the village, providing employment to as many as 300 workers at its peak and electricity and gas for streetlights and homes in the surrounding area long before rural electrification. Edward VII visited the mills in 1904. It closed in 1973.

In the mid-nineteenth century the five-story watermill was for a time leased as a gristmill to James Fennell, a Quaker, by James Prendergast of Ardfinnan Castle. W. Schofield of Dublin and also John Hogan Burke & Co. of the South of Ireland Woollen Factory in Cahir leased the woollen mills here.

Factory Hill Road between the mills and St. Finnian's Church, location of the old medieval town of Ardfynan and monastery of Ardfinnan Abbey was known for cottage weaving and spinning into the 19th century. The Knights Templar are believed to have been given control of woollen production at the former monastery as an early monastic woollen mills after Henry II visited the site in 1171. Ardfinnan Castle and the Templars stimulated growth such that the monastic village became a burgess town, with a corporation. The Knights Templar are believed to have controlled cloth production in the cottages extending from their mill on the river to the top of Factory Hill Road at Saint Finnian's Church. A miller named William the Dyer was recorded in the medieval village of Ardfynan in 1295.

The old coach road between Cork and Dublin passed by here and the economy was stimulated by pilgrims since ancient times. Alternately, the Countess of Donoughmore set up an annual clothing market after the famine, called the Ardfinnan Clothing Club.

=== Developments ===
Ardfinnan was a location, used by Atari, for the manufacture of wooden video game arcade cabinets from 1974 to 1984. At its height 200 workers were building 2,000 arcade cabinets a month at the location just outside the village. The plant in Ardfinnan closed in 1989.

An insulation manufacturing company, Moy Isover, was also based in the village from 1974 until its closure in 2008.

In January 2017, €800,000 was allocated for essential remedial works on the bridge by the government. As a public safety initiative, a traffic light one way system was put in place on the bridge from the end of 2015 after significant structural damage was discovered.

== Transport ==
During the week, the area is served five times a day in each direction by Bus Éireann route 245 linking it to Clonmel, Mitchelstown, Fermoy and Cork. At the weekend, there are three buses each way.

== Sport ==
The local Gaelic Athletic Association clubs include Ballybacon-Grange GAA and Ardfinnan GAA. The former is primarily a hurling club. The latter, a Gaelic football club, won the Tipperary Senior Football Championship in 2005.

Ardfinnan Anglers have licensed fishing rights to approximately 15 km of river bank on the river Suir. Brown trout and Salmon can be caught in these waters. The river banks are maintained annually by club members who perform the work voluntarily before the commencement of the annual fishing season.

== See also ==
- List of abbeys and priories in the Republic of Ireland (County Tipperary)
