= 1971 All-Ireland Senior Hurling Championship final =

1971 All-Ireland Senior Hurling Final
- Event: 1971 All-Ireland Senior Hurling Championship
Tipperary	Kilkenny
5-17	5-14
- Date: 5 September 1971
- Venue: Croke Park, Dublin
- Referee: Frank Murphy (Cork)
- Attendance: 61,393

The 1971 All-Ireland Senior Hurling Championship Final was the 84th All-Ireland final and the culmination of the 1971 All-Ireland Senior Hurling Championship, an inter-county hurling tournament for the top teams in Ireland. The match took place on 5 September 1971, at Croke Park, Dublin. The match was contested by 1969 winners Kilkenny and 1968 runners-up Tipperary, and it was refereed by Frank Murphy from Cork.

== Background ==
The All-Ireland final was the thirteenth meeting of Kilkenny and Tipperary in a championship decider. Tipperary held the balance of power in all previous meetings between the two, having recorded seven All-Ireland victories to Kilkenny's five. Both sides last met in the All-Ireland final of 1967 when Kilkenny recorded their first championship victory over their nearest neighbours since 1922. Both Tipperary and Kilkenny had dominated hurling throughout the sixties, with Tipp winning All-Ireland titles in 1961, 1962, 1964 and 1965, and Kilkenny claiming the championship in 1963, 1967 and 1969. Moreover, Tipperary had lost back-to-back All-Ireland finals in 1967 and 1968. The thought of losing a third championship decider on-the-trot proved a great motivation.

In 1970, Cork defeated Wexford in the All-Ireland final to win their 21st title, drawing level with Tipperary. A Tipperary victory in 1971 would move them one title ahead of Cork, while Kilkenny were seeking their 18th title.

== Pre-match ==
=== Referee ===
Cork-based referee Frank Murphy was named as the referee for the 1971 All-Ireland final on 30 August 1971. His only experience in a national senior final was the National Hurling League final between Tipperary and Limerick the previous May. Twenty-seven-year-old Murphy, a former teacher and now a regional manager in Cork for an American publishing company, has been refereeing for ten years, having started his career in the Blackrock street leagues. He is currently the secretary of the Blackrock club and its representative on the Cork County Board. He has officiated at county finals all over the southern province but became prominent on the inter-county scene in 1970 when he officiated in two Munster championship matches. Earlier in 1971 Murphy was appointed to the Central Council refereeing panel and, following a competent display in the league decider, took charge of the Munster decider between Tipperary and Limerick.

Murphy's umpires for the final were J. Duggan, M. J. 'Inky' Flaherty (both Galway), E. Devlin (Tyrone) and D. Anglin (Antrim). Flaherty played with Galway for nearly two decades and was a distinguished referee in his own right, having taken charge of the 1949 All-Ireland final between Tipperary and Laois.

=== Wedding ===
On 28 August 1971, just one week before the All-Ireland final, Tipperary's John Flanagan married Margaret Gleeson in the Church of the Sacred Heart, Gortnahoe, County Tipperary.

== Broadcasting ==
The All-Ireland final was broadcast in Ireland by RTÉ with Michael O'Hehir providing the commentary. The programme ran from 1.20pm until 5.10pm and included basic coverage of both the All-Ireland minor and senior finals. Following on from RTÉ's broadcast of the 1971 Eurovision Song Contest in colour, this became the first All-Ireland final to be broadcast live in colour. The senior final was also broadcast live on Radio Éireann.

== Match ==
=== First half ===
The opening forty minutes proved to be a dour battle, characterised by close marking and a lack of free-flowing hurling. ipperary played with a strong breeze and defended the Railway end. They also had to contend with playing into a blazing sub. Tipp's Francis Loughnane opened the scoring after just three minutes when he captured the first two points of the day. What followed for the next fifteen minutes was a series of tit-for-tat scores, with no side building up a huge lead. After nineteen minutes Tipperary's Noel O'Dwyer scored the first goal of the match, a shot from long range that travelled along the ground. Kilkenny's Eddie Keher brought his team back into contention just a minute later when he blasted a 21-yards free straight into the net for Kilkenny's opening goal of the game. Just two minutes later John Flanagan capitalised on a shrewd pass from Roger Ryan to shoot Tipperary's second goal. A stalemate developed following this score, however, Keher tapped over another point for 'the Cats' eight minutes later. With just a minute left to play Mossy Murphy shot Kilkenny's second goal after being put in possession by Pat Delaney. Loughnane bookended the opening half when he scored the last point before the short whistle, giving Tipperary a 2-10 to 2-4 lead.

=== Second half ===
Kilkenny started the second period of play with two quick points by Eddie Keher. Michael 'Babs' Keating replied in kind for Tipp, however, in the forty-fifth minute Ned Byrne flicked home a Kilkenny goal after a lob from the right by Martin Brennan. Less than two minutes later a Séamus Hogan shot hit the upright and Roger Ryan goaled for Tipperary on the rebound. The Munster champions failed to capitalise on this and Eddie Keher scored three more points inside four minutes. A fourth unanswered point by Mossy Murphy brought Kilkenny within one. Tipperary stretched out their lead to three points with a succession of points, however, this lead was short-lived as Kieran Purcell brought Kilkenny back on level terms, 4-11 to 3-14, with a goal. After more than an hour of hurling played at this stage Frank Cummins stepped up with a point to give Kilkenny the lead for the first time in the match. Four minutes later Tipperary were back in front when Roger Ryan turned a free from Mick Roche into the Kilkenny net. Tipperary heaped on more punishment and stretched the lead with three more unanswered points. By this stage 'Babs' Keating had thrown off his boots and socks and was roaming around midfield in his bare feet. He sent a long ball into Dinny Ryan who sealed the game with Tipperary's fifth and final goal of the day. Kilkenny's Eddie Keher refused to give up and goaled a 21-yards free with just two minutes remaining. On the stroke of full-time Keher pointed again for Kilkenny and brought his own tally to 2-11. It was too late as Tipperary sealed a three-point victory.

=== Details ===
5 September
15:15 IST

Tipperary	5-17 – 5-14	Kilkenny
M. Keating (0-7), R. Ryan (2-0), J. Flanagan (1-2), D. Ryan (1-1), F. Loughnane (0-4), N. O'Dwyer (1-0), P.J. Ryan (0-2), P. Byrne (0-1).		E. Keher (2-11), M. Murphy (1-1), K. Purcell (1-0), N. Byrne (1-0), F. Cummins (0-2).

Croke Park, Dublin
Attendance: 61,393
Referee: Frank Murphy (Cork)

TIPPERARY:
GK	1	Peter O'Sullivan
RCB	2	Liam King
FB	3	John Kelly
LCB	4	John Gleeson
RWB	5	Tadhg O'Connor (c)
CB	6	Mick Roche
LWB	7	Len Gaynor
MD	8	P. J. Ryan
MD	9	Séamus Hogan	(substituted off) 57'
RCF	10	Francis Loughnane
CF	11	Noel O'Dwyer
LCF	12	Denis Ryan
LCF	13	John Flanagan	(substituted off) 59'
LCF	14	Roger Ryan
LCF	15	Babs Keating
Substitutes:
	16	John O'Donoghue
	17	Noel Lane
	18	Jimmy Doyle	(substituted on) 57'
	19	Jack Ryan
	20	Paul Byrne	(substituted on) 59'
	21	Jim Fogarty
	22	Michael Jones

KILKENNY:
GK	1	Ollie Walsh
RCB	2	Phil 'Fan' Larkin	(substituted off) 66'
FB	3	Pa Dillon
LCB	4	Jim Treacy
RWB	5	Willie Murphy	(substituted off) 40'
CB	6	Pat Henderson (c)
LWB	7	Martin Coogan
MD	8	Frank Cummins
MD	9	Pat Lawlor
RCF	10	Mossy Murphy
CF	11	Pat Delaney
LCF	12	Eddie Keher
LCF	13	Mick Brennan	(substituted off) 62'
LCF	14	Kieran Purcell
LCF	15	Ned Byrne
Substitutes:
	16	Noel Skehan
	17	Ted Carroll	(substituted on) 66'
	18	Phil Cullen	(substituted on) 62'
	19	Paddy Moran	(substituted on) 40'
	20	Mick Lawler
	21	Johnny Moriarty
	22	Nicky Orr
	23	Seán Leahy

MATCH OFFICIALS

- Umpires:
  - M. J. Flaherty (Galway)
  - J. Duggan (Galway)
  - E. Devin (Tyrone)
  - D. Anglin (Antrim)

MATCH RULES

- 80 minutes.
- Replay if sides level at the end of 80 minutes.
- Eight named substitutes.
- Maximum of three substitutions.
