= Patsy Rowland =

Irish hurler

Personal information
- Native name: Pádraig Ó Rothláin (Irish)
- Born: 1943 (age 82–83) Roscrea, County Tipperary, Ireland
- Occupation: Fitter
- Height: 5 ft 8 in (173 cm)

Sport
- Sport: Hurling
- Position: Right wing-back
Club
- Years: Club
- Roscrea
Club titles
- Offaly titles: 5
- Munster titles: 1
- All-Ireland Titles: 1
Inter-county
- Years: County
- 1968-1970: Tipperary
Inter-county titles
- Munster titles: 1
- All-Irelands: 0
- NHL: 1
- All Stars: 0

Patrick Rowland (born 1943) was an Irish hurling coach and player. At club level, he played with Roscrea and at inter-county level with the Tipperary senior hurling team. Rowland also served as a coach at club level.

== Playing career ==
Minogue played his club hurling with Roscrea at a time when the club had a number of successes. He won five Tipperary SHC medals in a six-year period between 1968 and 1973. Rowland was team captain when Roscrea won the Munster Club SHC title in 1969, before retaining the title in 1970. He won an All-Ireland Club SHC medal in 1971 following Roscrea's 4–05 to 2–05 defeat of St Rynagh's in the final.

At inter-county level, Rowland never played for Tipperary at underage levels but joined the senior team following club success with Roscrea. He won a National League–Munster SHC double in 1968 before being a substitute on the team beaten by Wexford in that year's All-Ireland final.

== Coaching career ==
In retirement from playing, Rowland remained involved with the Roscrea club. He was team manager when Moycarkey–Borris beat Roscrea by 2–12 to 0–11 in the 1982 final.

== Honours ==
Roscrea

- All-Ireland Senior Club Hurling Championship: 1971
- Munster Senior Club Hurling Championship: 1969 (c), 1970
- Tipperary Senior Hurling Championship: 1968, 1969, 1970 (c), 1972, 1973

Tipperary

- Munster Senior Hurling Championship: 1968
- National Hurling League: 1967–68
