= Joe Tynan =

Irish hurler

Personal information
- Native name: Seosamh Ó Teimhneáin (Irish)
- Born: 1950 (age 75–76) Roscrea; County Tipperary , Ireland
- Occupation: Painter

Sport
- Sport: Hurling
- Position: Right corner-forward
Club
- Years: Club
- Roscrea
Club titles
- Tipperary titles: 6
- Munster titles: 2
- All-Ireland Titles: 1
Inter-county
Years	County	Apps (scores)
1970-1974	Tipperary	1 (0-00)
Inter-county titles
- Munster titles: 0
- All-Irelands: 0
- NHL: 0
- All Stars: 0

Joe Tynan (born 1950) is an Irish former hurler. At club level he played with Roscrea and was also a member of the Tipperary senior hurling team.

== Career ==
Tynan first played hurling at juvenile and underage levels with the Roscrea club. He was part of the club's minor team that won consecutive North Tipperary MHC titles from 1966 and 1967, before later winning a Tipperary U21AHC title in 1968. By that stage Tynan had already joined the club's senior team and won the first of seven North Tipperary SHC titles and six Tipperary SHC medals. He top scored with two goals when Roscrea beat St. Rynagh's in the 1971 All-Ireland club final.

Performances at club level earned Tynan a call-up to the Tipperary minor hurling team, however, his two-year tenure with the team ended without success as Cork dominated the championship at the time. He also spent four seasons with the under-21 team at a time when Cork also dominated that championship. Tynan joined the senior team in 1970 but was later dropped before returning to the team in 1975.

== Honours ==
Roscrea

- All-Ireland Senior Club Hurling Championship: 1971
- Munster Senior Club Hurling Championship: 1969, 1970
- Tipperary Senior Hurling Championship: 1968, 1969, 1970, 1972, 1973, 1980
- North Tipperary Senior Hurling Championship: 1967, 1968, 1969, 1970, 1971, 1980, 1982
- Tipperary Under-21 A Hurling Championship: 1968
- Tipperary Minor A Hurling Championship: 1966, 1967
