= Peter O'Sullivan (hurler) =

Irish hurler (1943–2024)

Personal information
- Native name: Peadar Ó Súilleabháin (Irish)
- Born: 1943 Cashel, County Tipperary, Ireland
- Died: 7 July 2024 (aged 81) Cashel, County Tipperary, Ireland
- Occupation: Road worker
- Height: 5 ft 8 in (173 cm)

Sport
- Sport: Hurling
- Position: Goalkeeper
Club
- Years: Club
- 1959-1980: Cashel King Cormacs
Club titles
- Tipperary titles: 0
Inter-county
Years	County	Apps (scores)
1963-1972	Tipperary	7 (0-00)
Inter-county titles
- Munster titles: 3
- All-Irelands: 3
- NHL: 2
- All Stars: 0

Peter O'Sullivan (1943 – 7 July 2024) was an Irish hurler and coach. At club level he played with Cashel King Cormacs and was also a member of the Tipperary senior hurling team.

== Club career ==
O'Sullivan began his club career at juvenile level with the Rosgreen club, winning a West Tipperary U15HC title in 1957. He later transferred to the Cashel King Cormacs club and was part of the Cashel minor team that won three successive West Tipperary MAHC titles between 1959 and 1961, however, the club failed to secure a County MAHC title during that time.

By that stage, O'Sullivan had already progressed to the Cashel King Cormacs adult team. He was part of five West Tipperary SHC-winning teams between 1965 and 1980, however, a Tipperary SHC title eluded the club following these wins. O'Sullivan retired from club hurling with Cashel in December 1980.

== Inter-county career ==
O'Sullivan began his inter-county career with Tipperary at minor level in 1961. He won a Munster MHC medal that year after a 23-point defeat of Cork in the final. His minor career ended with a 3-13 to 0-15 defeat by Kilkenny in the 1961 All-Ireland minor final. O'Sullivan immediately progressed to the intermediate team and was in goal when Tipperary beat London by 1-10 to 1-07 in the 1963 All-Ireland intermediate final.

O'Sullivan's performances for the intermediate team resulted in an immediate call-up to the senior team for Tipperary's Oireachtas Cup defeat of Wexford in 1963. He was selected in goal the following year on Tipperary's inaugural under-21 team and ended the campaign with a winners' medal after an 8-09 to 3-01 defeat of Wexford in the 1964 All-Ireland under-21 final. O'Sullivan was also understudy goalkeeper to John O'Donoghue for Tipperary's National Hurling League-All-Ireland SHC double in 1964. He was again reserve goalkeeper the following year when Tipperary retained their National League and All-Ireland titles.

O'Sullivan was dropped from the senior team after Tipperary's bid for a third successive All-Ireland SHC title ended in 1966, however, he returned to the intermediate team in 1967. He earned a recall to the senior team in 1970 and came established himself as first-choice goalkeeper after coming on as a substitute for John O'Donoghue in the 1970 Munster final. O'Sullivan won his first Munster SHC medal on the field of play after a one-point defeat of Limerick in the 1971 Munster final. He ended the season with his first All-Ireland SHC medal on the field of play, after Tipperary beat Kilkenny by 5-17 to 5-14 in the 1971 All-Ireland final.

O'Sullivan's inter-county career ended in November 1972 when he received severe burns to his hands and face in a workplace accident.

== Inter-provincial career ==
O'Sullivan's performances at inter-county level resulted in his selection for Munster in their 1973 Railway Cup final defeat by Leinster.

== Coaching career ==
O'Sullivan enjoyed his first coaching success when he was part of the Seán Treacy's management team when the club won the West Tipperary SHC title in 1982. He became involved on inter-county coaching in 1985 when he was appointed as a selector with the Tipperary junior team. Tipperary claimed the Munster JHC title during his tenure, however, the team was beaten by Wexford in the 1985 All-Ireland junior final. O'Sullivan returned to club management with Cashel King Cormacs in 1988 and helped guide the team to the West Tipperary SHC title that year.

== Death ==
O'Sullivan died on 7 July 2024, at the age of 81.

== Honours ==
=== Player ===
Cashel King Cormacs

- West Tipperary Senior Hurling Championship: 1965, 1971, 1975, 1976, 1980
- West Tipperary Minor A Hurling Championship: 1959, 1960, 1961

Tipperary

- All-Ireland Senior Hurling Championship: 1964, 1965, 1971
- Munster Senior Hurling Championship: 1964, 1965, 1971
- National Hurling League: 1963–64, 1964–65
- All-Ireland Intermediate Hurling Championship: 1963
- Munster Intermediate Hurling Championship: 1963
- All-Ireland Under-21 Hurling Championship: 1964
- Munster Under-21 Hurling Championship: 1964
- Munster Minor Hurling Championship: 1961

=== Management ===
Seán Treacys

- West Tipperary Senior Hurling Championship: 1982

Cashel King Cormacs

- West Tipperary Senior Hurling Championship: 1988

Tipperary

- Munster Junior Hurling Championship: 1985
