= Tipperary county hurling team results (1970–1979) =

This article contains the results of the senior Tipperary county hurling team in the Championship during the 1970s.

Tipperary played 19 Championship games during the decade, winning 7, losing 9 and drawing 3. They won 1 Munster titles in 1971 and won 1 All Ireland title in 1971.

== 1970 ==
21 June
Munster Semi-final
3:30pm

Tipperary	2-9 – 0-5	Waterford
M. Roche (0-5), R. Ryan (1-1), N. O'Dwyer (1-0), J. McKenna (0-1), J. Flanagan (0-1), T. O'Connor (0-1).		P. Enright (0-4), S. Greene (0-5).

Cork Athletic Grounds, Cork
Referee: S. O'Connor (Limerick)

19 July
Munster Final
3:30pm

Cork	3-10 – 3-8	Tipperary
W. Walsh (2-0), C. Cullinane (1-0), C. McCarthy (0-3), G. McCarthy (0-2), D. Clifford (0-1), C. Roche (0-1), J. Murphy (0-1), T. Ryan (0-1), R. Cummins (0-1).		F. Loughnane (1-4), J. Flanagan (1-0), N. O'Dwyer (1-0), D. Ryan (0-2), M. Roche (0-1), P.J. Ryan (0-1).

Gaelic Grounds, Limerick
Referee: J. Fitzgerald (Limerick)

== 1971 ==
11 July
Munster Semi-final

Tipperary	1-15 – 3-4	Clare
M. Keating (1-3), L. Gaynor (0-3), S. Hogan (0-3), J. Flanagan (0-2), N, O'Dwyer (0-1), P. J. Ryan (0-1), F. Loughnane (0-1), T. O'Connor (0-1).		J. Rochford (1-1), M. Moroney (1-0), N. Casey (1-0), T. Ryan (0-1), P. Russell (0-1), M. Pewter (0-1).

Gaelic Grounds, Limerick
Attendance: 13,000
Referee: S. O'Connor (Limerick)

25 July
Munster Final

Tipperary	4-16 – 3-18	Limerick
M. Keating (3-4), J. Flanagan (0-5), P. J. Ryan (1-0), F. Loughnane (0-3), L. Gaynor (0-2), J. Doyle (0-1), N. O'Dwyer (0-1)		R. Bennis (0-12), É. Cregan (1-2), É. Grimes (1-1), D. Flynn (1-0), M. Graham (0-2), B. Hartigan (0-1)

FitzGerald Stadium, Killarney
Attendance: 31,118
Referee: F. Murphy (Cork)

15 August
All Ireland Semi-final

Tipperary	3-26 – 6-8	Galway
M. Keating (2-12), F. Loughnane (0-7), J. Flanagan (1-2), N. O'Dwyer (0-3), S. Hogan (0-1), J. Ryan (0-1).		P. Fahy (2-3), P. Ryan (2-0), B. O'Connor (1-1), P. Mitchell (1-1), J. Connolly (0-2), D. Coen (0-1).

St. Brendan's Park, Birr
Attendance: 15,022
Referee: J. Rankins (Laois)

5 September

All Ireland Final

Tipperary	5-17 – 5-14	Kilkenny
M. Keating (0-7), R. Ryan (2-0), J. Flanagan (1-2), D. Ryan (1-1), F. Loughnane (0-4), N. O'Dwyer (1-0), P.J. Ryan (0-2), P. Byrne (0-1).		E. Keher (2-11), M. Murphy (1-1), K. Purcell (1-0), N. Byrne (1-0), F. Cummins (0-2).

Croke Park, Dublin
Attendance: 61,393
Referee: F. Murphy (Cork)

Tipperary	Kilkenny

== 1972 ==
25 June
Munster Semi-final

Cork	3-8 – 3-8	Tipperary
C. McCarthy (1-6), R. Cummins (1-1), S. O'Leary (1-0), M. Malone (0-1).		N. O'Dwyer (1-1), J. Flanagan (1-1), R. Ryan (1-1), M. Roche (0-1), L. Gaynor (0-1).

Gaelic Grounds, Limerick
Referee: S. O'Connor (Limerick)

9 July
Munster Semi-final
Replay

Cork	3-10 – 2-7	Tipperary
G. McCarthy (2-1), M. Malone (1-2), R. Cummins (0-3), C. McCarthy (0-2), C. Roche (0-1), S. O'Leary (0-1).		S. Hogan (1-0), M. Coen (1-0), E. Loughnane (0-2), J. Flanagan (0-2), N. O'Dwyer (0-2), M. Roche (0-1).

Gaelic Grounds, Limerick
Referee: S. O'Connor (Limerick)

== 1973 ==
20 May
Munster Quarter-final

Tipperary	1-16 – 2-8	Waterford

Semple Stadium, Thurles

1 July
Munster Semi-final

Tipperary	5-4 – 1-10	Cork

Gaelic Grounds, Limerick

29 July
Munster Final

Tipperary	2-18 – 6-7	Limerick

Semple Stadium, Thurles
Referee: M. Slattery (Clare)

== 1974 ==
7 July
Munster Semi-Final

Clare	1-8 – 1-7	Tipperary
C. Honan (0-6), G. Lohan (1-0), M. Mooney (0-1), N. Casey (0-1).		F. Loughnane (1-4), J. Flanagan (0-1), P. Byrne (0-1), N. O'Dwyer (0-1).

Gaelic Grounds, Limerick
Referee: S. O'Connor (Limerick)

== 1975 ==
6 July
Munster Semi-Final

Tipperary	3-13 – 2-16	Limerick
M. Keating (2-3), F. Loughnane (1-3), J. Flanagan (0-3), S. Hogan (0-1), P. J. Ryan (0-1), F. Murphy (0-1), T. Butler (0-1).		R. Bennis (1-6), F. Nolan (0-4), G. Moloney (1-0), E. Grimes (0-3), L. O'Donoghue (0-2), J. Neenan (0-1).

Semple Stadium, Thurles
Attendance: 25,000
Referee: N. Dalton (Waterford)

20 July
Munster Semi-Final Replay

Limerick	0-17 – 1-10	Tipperary
R. Bennis (0-9), L. O'Donoghue (0-2), E. Grimes (0-2), N. Rea (0-2), E. Cregan (0-1), J. McKenna (0-1).		J. Flanagan (0-6), F. Murphy (1-1), F. Loughnane (0-1), M. Keating (0-1), P. J. Ryan (0-1).

Gaelic Grounds, Limerick
Attendance: 32,000
Referee: N. Dalton (Waterford)

== 1976 ==
14 June
Munster Semi-Final

Cork	4-10 – 2-15	Tipperary
J. Fenton (1-2), C. McCarthy (1-2), R. Cummins (1-1), S. O'Leary (1-1), J. Barry-Murphy (0-1), D. Coughlan (0-1), P. Moylan (0-1), M. Malone (0-1).		J. Grogan (1-8), T. Butler (1-3), T. Quigley (0-1), S. Power (0-1), S. Hogan (0-1), F. Loughnane (0-1).

Gaelic Grounds, Limerick
Referee: S. O'Grady (Limerick)

== 1977 ==
5 June
Munster First Round

Clare	1-10 – 0-13	Tipperary
N. Casey (1-0), M. Moroney (0-3), C. Honan (0-2), P. O'Connor (0-1), J. McNamara (0-1), E. O'Connor (0-1), J. Callinan (0-1), S. Stack (0-1).		P. Quigley (0-6), P. Fitzelle (0-1), T. O'Connor (0-1), J. Kehoe (0-1), N. O'Dwyer (0-1), M. Doyle (0-1), T. Butler (0-1), T. O'Dwyer (0-1).

Gaelic Grounds, Limerick
Attendance: 20,703
Referee: F. Murphy (Cork)

12 June
Munster First Round Replay

Clare	0-13 – 1-7	Tipperary
M. Moroney (0-3), P. O'Connor (0-3), C. Honan (0-2), J. Callinan (0-2), E. O'Connor (0-1), N. Casey (0-1), J. McNamara (0-1).		S. Ryan (1-3), P. Quigley (0-2), P. Queally (0-1), J. Kehoe (0-1).

Gaelic Grounds, Limerick
Attendance: 20,546
Referee: F. Murphy (Cork)

== 1978 ==
11 June Munster Quarter-final	Limerick	1-14 - 0-9	Tipperary	Páirc Uí Chaoimh

== 1979 ==
3 June Munster Semi-final	Cork	1–14 – 2–10	Tipperary	Páirc Uí Chaoimh
	C McCarthy (0–5), J Barry-Murphy (1–0), J Fenton (0–3), P Moylan (0–3), J Horgan (0–2), R Cummins (0–1).		P O'Neill (1–2), M Doyle (1–0), N O'Dwyer (0–3), F Loughnane (0–3), G Stapleton (0–1), E O'Shea (0–1).	Attendance: 40,690; Referee: N Dalton (Waterford)
