= 1971 Tipperary Senior Hurling Championship =

Annual hurling competition season

- Dates: 13 June – 31 October 1971
- Teams: 30
- Champions: Moyne-Templetuohy (1st title); Jim Fogarty (captain)
- Runners-up: Roscrea; Donie Moloney (captain)

The 1971 Tipperary Senior Hurling Championship was the 80th staging of the Tipperary Senior Hurling Championship since its establishment by the Tipperary County Board in 1887. The competition ran from 13 June to 31 October 1971.

Roscrea were the defending champions.

The final was played on 31 October 1971 at Semple Stadium in Thurles, between Moyne-Templetuohy and Rocrea, in what remains their only meeting in the final. Moyne-Templetuohy won the match by 2–08 to 0–06 to claim their only championship title.

== Results ==
=== Quarter-finals ===
12 September 1971 Quarter-final	Moyne-Templetuohy	4-12 - 2-06	Éire Óg Annacarty	Semple Stadium
	B Grady 2-2, W Fogarty 1-2, M Grady 1-1, T Egan 0-3, M Costigan 0-1, M Troy 0-1.		T O'Rourke 2-2, P Ryan 0-1, J O'Brien 0-1.

12 September 1971 Quarter-final	Thurles Sarsfields	2-15 - 2-08	Moneygall	MacDonagh Park
	J Doyle 1-7, P Byrne 1-1, J Cooke 0-3, J Doyle Jnr 0-2, N Kennedy 0-1, TJ Semple 0-1.		J Ryan 0-4, J Collison 1-0, D Kennedy 1-0, P Ryan 0-3, S Ryan 0-1.

12 September 1971 Quarter-final	Ballybacon–Grange	2-17 - 1-10	Kilrane MacDonaghs	Semple Stadium
	M Keating 1-7, B Bourke 1-2, J Cummins 0-3, P Savage 0-3, J Condon 0-1, J Maher 0-1, L Myles 0-1.		T Moloughney 1-1, N Killackey 0-4, S Dwan 0-2, D Gaynor 0-1, M Keogh 0-1, J Maher 0-1.

10 October 1071 Quarter-final	Roscrea	4-12 - 1-10	Borris–Ileigh	Semple Stadium
	F Loughnane 1-8, J Cunningham 1-2, L Brussells 1-0, J Hannon 1-0, D Moloney 0-1, J Tynan 0-1.		N Maher 1-1, N O'Dwyer 0-4, T Delaney 0-3, L Devaney 0-1, M Stapleton 0-1.

=== Semi-finals ===
10 October 1071 Semi-final	Moyne-Templetuohy	4-12 - 3-03	Ballybacon–Grange	Semple Stadium
	T Egan 0-8, T Quinlan 2-1, M Troy 1-1, B O'Grady 1-1, M O'Grady 0-1.		M Keating 2-1, J Cummins 1-1, L Myles 0-1.

17 October 1971 Semi-final	Roscrea	3-13 - 4-07	Thurles Sarsfields	MacDonagh Park
	F Loughnane 1-5, J Cunningham 1-1, J Tynan 1-0, T O'Connor 0-2, B Stapleton 0-1, J Hannon 0-1, D Moloney 0-1, P Roland 0-1, L Spooner 0-1.		J Doyle 3-4, TJ Semple 1-1, P Byrne 0-1, S McLoughlin 0-1.

=== Final ===
31 October 1971 Final	Moyne-Templetuohy	2-08 - 0-06	Roscrea	Semple Stadium
	M O'Grady 1-1, M Troy 1-0, T Egan 0-3, P Sweeney 0-2, W O'Grady 0-1, W Fogarty 0-1.		F Loughnane 0-3, T O'Connor 0-1, J Tynan 0-1, P Roland 0-1.	Referee: S Moloney
