= John Dillon (hurler) =

Irish hurler (1943–2019)

Personal information
- Native name: Seán Diolún (Irish)
- Born: 14 September 1943 Roscrea, County Tipperary, Ireland
- Died: 23 June 2019 (aged 75) Roscrea, County Tipperary, Ireland

Sport
- Sport: Hurling
- Position: Right corner-back
Club
- Years: Club
- Roscrea
Club titles
- Tipperary titles: 2
Inter-county
Years	County	Apps (scores)
1964-1965	Tipperary	0 (0-00)
Inter-county titles
- Munster titles: 1
- All-Irelands: 1
- NHL: 1

John Dillon (14 September 1943 – 23 June 2019) was an Irish hurler who played for Tipperary Senior Championship club Roscrea. He played for the Tipperary senior hurling team for one season, during which time he usually lined out as a right corner-back.

Dillon began his hurling career at club level with Roscrea. After enjoying much success in the minor and under-21 grades, he eventually broke onto the club's senior team. He enjoyed his first success at senior level when the club won the North Tipperary Championship in 1968. Dillon later captained Roscrea to the 1968 Tipperary Senior Championship title before winning a second title in 1969.

At inter-county level, Dillon was part of the Tipperary minor team that lost back-to-back All-Ireland finals in 1960 and 1961 before later winning an All-Ireland Championship with the under-21 team in 1964. He joined the Tipperary senior team in 1964. Dillon was a substitute on Tipperary's All-Ireland Championship-winning team in 1965. He also secured Munster Championship and National Hurling League medals that season.

== Honours ==
Roscrea

- Tipperary Senior Hurling Championship (2): 1968 (c), 1969
- North Tipperary Senior Hurling Championship (4): 1963, 1967, 1968, 1969
- Tipperary Under-21 Hurling Championship (2): 1963, 1964
- Tipperary Minor Hurling Championship (3): 1959, 1960, 1961

Tipperary

- All-Ireland Senior Hurling Championship (1): 1965
- Munster Senior Hurling Championship (7): 1965
- National Hurling League (1): 1964-65
- All-Ireland Under-21 Hurling Championship (1): 1965
- Munster Under-21 Hurling Championship (1): 1965
- Munster Minor Hurling Championship (2): 1960, 1961
