= 1971 All-Ireland Senior Club Hurling Championship final =

1971 All-Ireland Senior Club Hurling Final
- Event: 1970–71 All-Ireland Senior Club Hurling Championship
Roscrea	St. Rynagh's
4–5	2–5
- Date: 19 December 1971
- Venue: St. Brendan's Park, Birr
- Referee: Frank Murphy (Cork)

The 1971 All-Ireland Senior Club Hurling Championship final was a hurling match played at St. Brendan's Park on 19 December 1971 to determine the winners of the 1970–71 All-Ireland Senior Club Hurling Championship, the first season of the All-Ireland Senior Club Hurling Championship, a tournament organised by the Gaelic Athletic Association for the champion clubs of the four provinces of Ireland. The final was contested by Roscrea of Tipperary and St. Rynagh's of Offaly, with Roscrea winning by 4-5 to 2-5.

The match was played in deplorable conditions in the height of winter, however, in spite of this, both sides played excellent hurling. The Tipperary champions, Roscrea, were at their brilliant best and had an interval lead of 2–4 to 0–1. St. Rynagh's had a very slow start and were held scoreless against the wind for 29 minutes.

An early goal by Barney Moylan held out prospects of a St. Rynagh's comeback early in the second half, however, a solo-run goal by Joe Tynan produced a goal that put Roscrea back in command. Roscrea were regarded as the fitter side with Francis Loughnane leading a set of forwards who could not be held. Roscrea's half-back line also came in for praise in nullifying the St. Rynagh's attack.

St. Rynaghs' All-Ireland defeat was the first of two All-Ireland defeats in three years. They remain a team who has contested All-Ireland deciders but has never claimed the ultimate prize.

== Match ==
=== Details ===
19 December 1971

Roscrea	4–5 – 2–5	St. Rynagh's
J Tynan (2–0), J Cunningham (1–0), M Nolan (1–0), F Loughnane (0–3), P Roland (0–2).		B Moylan (1–2), B Johnston (1–1), P Mulhaire (0–1), B Lyons (0–1).

St. Brendan's Park, Birr
Referee: F Murphy (Cork)

Roscrea	St. Rynagh's
