= Martin Loughnane =

Irish hurler and coach (1922–2010)

Personal information
- Born: 24 November 1917 Roscrea; County Tipperary, Ireland
- Died: 17 October 2003 (aged 85) Roscrea, County Tipperary, Ireland
- Occupation: Factory worker

Sport
- Sport: Hurling
- Position: Left wing-forward
Club
- Years: Club
- 1934–1967: Roscrea
Club titles
- Tipperary titles: 0
Inter-county
- Years: County
- 1940–1945: Tipperary
Inter-county titles
- Munster titles: 1
- All-Irelands: 1
- NHL: 0

Martin Loughnane (24 November 1917 – 17 October 2003) was an Irish hurler and coach. At club level he played with Roscrea, and also lined out at inter-county level with various Tipperary teams.

== Playing career ==
Loughnane first played hurling as a young boy in the Roscrea street leagues as a member of the main street team. He was on the Roscrea NS team that won a North Tipperary title in 1930. Loughnane won a North Tipperary MHC title with the Roscrea minor team in 1931, before claiming two further titles in 1934 and 1935.

Loughnane was still eligible for the minor grade when he was selected in goal for the Roscrea senior team in 1934. He won a total of eight North Tipperary SHC medals between 1936 and 1954. Loughnane retired from club hurling shortly after, however, he returned to the team to claim a ninth winners' medal in 1967.

At inter-county levelwith Tipperary, Loughnane spent three years with the minor team. He was part of the team that won back-to-back All-Ireland MHC titles in 1933 and 1934. Loughnane later earned selection to the senior team and won Munster SHC and All-Ireland SHC medals in 1945.

== Coaching career ==
In retirement from playing, Loughnane trained a number of Roscrea teams. He achieved his most notable successes by winning Offaly SHC titles with Coolderry in 1979 and 1980, and with Kinnitty in 1984 and 1985.

== Death ==
Loughnane died on 17 October 2003, at the age of 85.

== Honours ==
Roscrea

- North Tipperary Senior Hurling Championship: 1936, 1937, 1939, 1941, 1942, 1945, 1949, 1954, 1967
- North Tipperary Minor Hurling Championship: 1931, 1934, 1935

Tipperary

- All-Ireland Senior Hurling Championship: 1945
- Munster Senior Hurling Championship: 1945
- All-Ireland Minor Hurling Championship: 1933, 1934
- Munster Minor Hurling Championship: 1933, 1934, 1935
