= Jack Ryan (Roscrea hurler) =

Irish hurler

Personal information
- Native name: Seán Ó Riain (Irish)
- Born: 1928 (age 97–98) Roscrea, County Tipperary, Ireland

Sport
- Sport: Hurling
- Position: Right corner-forward
Club
- Years: Club
- Roscrea
Club titles
- Tipperary titles: 0
Inter-county
- Years: County
- 1947-1953: Tipperary
Inter-county titles
- Munster titles: 0
- All-Irelands: 1
- NHL: 2

Jack Ryan (born 1928) is an Irish retired hurler who played as a right corner-forward for the Tipperary senior team.

Ryan joined the team during the 1947 championship and was a regular member of the extended panel until his retirement after the 1953 championship. During that time he won one All-Ireland medal and two National Hurling League medals.

At club level Ryan was a multiple North Tipperary divisional medalist with Roscrea.

His brothers, Mick and Dinny Ryan, also played with Tipperary.
