= Tadhg O'Connor =

Irish hurler and manager

Tadhg O’Connor
Personal information
- Native name: Tadhg Ó Conchubhair (Irish)
- Born: 1948 (age 77–78) Roscrea, County Tipperary, Ireland
- Height: 5 ft 8 in (173 cm)

Sport
- Sport: Hurling
- Position: Right wing-back
Club
- Years: Club
- Roscrea
Club titles
- Tipperary titles: 6
- Munster titles: 2
- All-Ireland Titles: 1
Inter-county
Years	County	Apps (scores)
1968-1982	Tipperary	23 (0-3)
Inter-county titles
- Munster titles: 1
- All-Irelands: 1
- NHL: 1
- All Stars: 3

Tadhg O'Connor (born 1948) is an Irish former hurling manager and former player who played as a right wing-back for the Tipperary senior team.

Born in Roscrea, County Tipperary, O'Connor was introduced to hurling in his youth. He developed his skills at Roscrea CBS while simultaneously becoming involved at underage levels with the Roscrea club. An All-Ireland medal winner with the Roscrea senior team, O'Connor also won two Munster medals and six championship medals.

O'Connor made his debut on the inter-county scene at the age of seventeen when he first linked up with the Tipperary minor team. After an unsuccessful time in this grade, he later won an All-Ireland medal with the under-21 team. O'Connor joined the extended Tipperary senior panel during the 1968 championship. He went on to play a key role for Tipperary in the half-back line, and won one All-Ireland medal, one Munster medal and one National Hurling League medal. O'Connor captained the team to All-Ireland victory in 1971.

As a member of the Munster inter-provincial team, O'Connor won two Railway Cup medals. Throughout his inter-county career, he made 23 championship appearances. O'Connor retired from inter-county hurling following the conclusion of the 1982 championship. He returned as a member of the Tipperary Masters team in 1992 and won two further All-Ireland medals.

O'Connor has been involved in team management and coaching in all grades at club level with Roscrea. He served as manager of the Tipperary under-21 team for an unsuccessful three-year spell between 1986 and 1988.

== Playing career ==
=== Club ===
In 1968, O'Connor was a key member of the Roscrea senior team that made a long-overdue breakthrough and claimed the championship for the very first time. The 2-13 to 3-4 defeat of Thurles Sarsfields gave O'Connor a first winners' medal in the competition.

Roscrea retained the title in 1969, with O'Connor winning a second championship medal following a 4-13 to 0-5 defeat of Carrick Davins. He later collected a Munster medal following a 3-6 to 1-9 defeat of Glen Rovers of Cork.

In 1970, Roscrea secured a third successive championship. The 3-11 to 2-12 defeat of Thurles Sarsfields gave O'Connor a third successive championship medal. Roscrea subsequently retained their provincial crown. The 4-11 to 1-6 defeat of Clarecastle gave O'Connor a second successive Munster medal. On 19 December 1971, Roscrea faced St. Rynagh's of Offaly in the inaugural All-Ireland final. The Tipperary champions held the upper hand and held a 2–4 to 0–1 interval lead. An early goal by Barney Moylan held out prospects of a St. Rynagh's comeback early in the second half. However, a solo-run goal by Joe Tynan produced a goal that put Roscrea back in command and they eventually secured a 4-5 to 2-5 victory. The win gave O'Connor an All-Ireland Senior Club Hurling Championship medal.

Four-in-a-row proved beyond Roscrea. However, the team bounced back in 1972. A 5-8 to 3-6 defeat of Borris-Ileigh gave O'Connor a fourth championship medal.

Roscrea retained the championship title once again in 1973. A 3-14 to 3-8 defeat of Kilruane McDonaghs secured a fifth winners' medal for O'Connor.

After a period of decline, including the loss of two finals, Roscrea reached the decider again in 1980. A narrow 3-11 to 2-13 defeat of Kilruane McDonaghs gave O'Connor his sixth championship medal.

=== Inter-county ===
O'Connor first played for Tipperary when he linked up with the minor team in 1966. His tenure in this grade was short-lived as Tipperary exited the provincial championship at the hands of Galway.

In 1967, O'Connor joined the Tipperary under-21 team. He captured a Munster medal that year following a 3-9 to 3-5 defeat of Galway. On 3 September 1967, Tipperary faced Dublin in the All-Ireland final. Pat O'Connor top scored for Tipperary with 1-3 as a narrow 1-8 to 1-7 victory gave Tipperary the title. The win also gave O'Connor an All-Ireland Under-21 Hurling Championship medal.

O'Connor was added to the extended Tipperary senior panel in 1968, however, he didn't make his championship debut until 21 June 1970 in a 2-9 to 0-5 Munster semi-final defeat of Waterford.

In 1971, O'Connor was appointed captain of the Tipperary senior team. A subsequent 4-16 to 3-18 victory over Limerick gave him a Munster medal. On 5 September 1971, Tipperary faced Kilkenny in the All-Ireland final, the first to be broadcast in colour by Telefís Éireann and the only eighty-minute meeting between the two sides. Kilkenny's ever-dependable goalkeeper, Ollie Walsh, had a nightmare of a game in which he conceded five goals, one of which passed through his legs, while Tipperary's Babs Keating played out the closing stages of the game in his bare feet. Tipperary emerged the victors on a score line of 5-17 to 5-14. As well as collecting an All-Ireland medal, O'Connor also had the honour of collecting the Liam MacCarthy Cup. His performances throughout the year also earned him a place on the inaugural All-Stars team.

Tipperary surrendered their Munster and All-Ireland title sin 1972. The team bounced back in 1973 to reach the Munster final again. Limerick were the opponents for the second time in three years, however, on this occasion O'Connor ended up on the losing side. In spite of this defeat he was later presented with a second All-Star.

The next decade saw Tipp go into terminal decline. The county failed to win a single championship match, however, O'Connor did win a National Hurling League medal in 1979. This league victory was followed by a third All-Star award. He retired from inter-county hurling without further success in 1982.

=== Inter-provincial ===
O'Connor also lined out with Munster in the inter-provincial hurling championship where he played alongside his championship rivals from other counties. He first played for his province in 1973 as Munster were defeated by arch-rivals Leinster. It was a similar story in 1974 as Leinster retained the title. Two years later, in 1976, O'Connor captured his first Railway Cup medal as Munster stopped a Leinster six in-a-row. Defeat was O'Connor's lot again in 1980; however, he collected a second winners' medal in the competition in 1981.

== Honours ==
=== Roscrea ===
- All-Ireland Senior Club Hurling Championship:
  - Winner (1): 1971
- Munster Senior Club Hurling Championship:
  - Winner (2): 1969, 1970
  - Runner-up (2): 1972, 1980
- Tipperary Senior Hurling Championship:
  - Winner (6): 1968, 1969, 1970, 1972, 1973, 1980
  - Runner-up (7): 1967, 1971, 1976, 1978, 1981, 1982, 1985

=== Tipperary ===
- All-Ireland Senior Hurling Championship:
  - Winner (1): 1971
- Munster Senior Hurling Championship:
  - Winner (1): 1971
  - Runner-up (2): 1970, 1973
- National Hurling League:
  - Winner (1): 1978-1979
  - Runner-up (2): 1970-1971, 1975-1976
- All-Ireland Under-21 Hurling Championship:
  - Winner (1): 1967
- Munster Under-21 Hurling Championship:
  - Winner (1): 1967

=== Munster ===
- Railway Cup:
  - Winner (2): 1976, 1981
  - Runner-up (3): 1973, 1974, 1980

=== Individual ===
- All Stars:
  - Winner (2): 1971, 1975

Sporting positions
Preceded by Francis Loughnane	Tipperary Senior Hurling Captain; 1971	Succeeded by Michael 'Babs' Keating
Achievements
Preceded by Paddy Barry (Cork)	All-Ireland Senior Hurling Final winning captain 1971	Succeeded by Noel Skehan (Kilkenny)
