= John Gleason =

John Gleason may refer to:

- John J. Gleason, American politician in Michigan
- John S. Gleason Jr., American banker and government administrator
- Jackie Gleason (John Herbert Gleason), American actor, comedian and writer

== See also ==
- John Gleeson (disambiguation)
