= Jim Fogarty (hurler) =

Irish hurler (born 1950)

Personal information
- Native name: Séamus Ó Fógartaigh (Irish)
- Born: 1950 (age 75–76) Moyne, County Tipperary, Ireland

Sport
- Sport: Hurling
- Position: Right corner-back
Club
- Years: Club
- Moyne–Templetuohy
Club titles
- Tipperary titles: 1
Inter-county
- Years: County
- 1969-1974: Tipperary
Inter-county titles
- Munster titles: 1
- All-Irelands: 1
- NHL: 0
- All Stars: 0

James Fogarty (born 1950) is an Irish former hurler. At club level he played with Moyne–Templetuohy and was also a member of the Tipperary senior hurling team.

== Career ==
Fogarty first played hurling at juvenile and underage levels with Moyne–Templetuohy. He progressed onto the club's senior team and captained the side to the Tippearry SHC title in 1971.

Fogarty first appeared on the inter-county scene for Tipperary at minor and under-21 levels, however, his underage career ended without success as Cork was the dominant team at the time. Fogarty joined the senior team in 1969 and was a substitute when Tipperary beat Kilkenny by 5-17 to 5-14 in the 1971 All-Ireland final. He also lined out with Munster in the Railway Cup.

== Honours ==
Moyne–Templetuohy

- Tipperary Senior Hurling Championship: 1971 (c)
- Mid Tipperary Senior Hurling Championship: 1970, 1972

Tipperary

- All-Ireland Senior Hurling Championship: 1971
- Munster Senior Hurling Championship: 1971
