= Dinny Ryan =

Dinny Ryan may refer to:

- Denis Ryan (footballer) (1916–1980), Australian rules footballer
- Dinny Ryan (hurler) (1927–2009), Irish hurler for Tipperary
