= 1970 Tipperary Senior Hurling Championship =

Annual hurling competition season

- Dates: 3 May – 4 October 1970
- Teams: 28
- Champions: Roscrea (3rd title); Patsy Rowland (captain)
- Runners-up: Thurles Sarsfields; T. J. Semple (captain)

Tournament statistics
- Matches played: 29
- Goals scored: 187 (6.45 per match)
- Points scored: 525 (18.1 per match)

The 1970 Tipperary Senior Hurling Championship was the 79th staging of the Tipperary Senior Hurling Championship since its establishment by the Tipperary County Board in 1887. The draw for the opening round fixtures was made on 7 April 1970. The competition ran from 3 May to 4 October 1970.

Roscrea were the defending champions.

The final was played on 4 October 1970 at Thurles Sportsfield, between Roscrea and Thurles Sarsfields, in what was their fifth meeting in the final overall and a first meeting in two years. Roscrea won the match by 3–11 to 2–12 to claim their third championship title overall and a third title in succession.

== Results ==
=== First round ===
3 May 1970 First round	Holycross–Ballycahill	4-03 - 3-09	Ballybacon–Grange	Leahy Park
	S Mackey 2-0, P Cahill 1-1, J Walsh 1-0, R Dwan 0-1, L Mackey 0-1.		M Keating 2-5, J Healy 1-0, M Burns 0-1, B Maher 0-1, P Savage 0-1, J Cummins 0-1.

3 May 1970 First round	Moneygall	4-08 - 4-05	Cashel King Cormacs	Thurles SPortsfield

3 May 1970 First round	Lorrha	4-01 - 5-10	Seán Treacys	MacDonagh Park

3 May 1970 First round	Wild Rovers	0-09 - 3-08	Kilruane MacDonaghs	Páirc Shíleáin

3 May 1970 First round	Marlfield	2-06 - 3-07	Moyne–Templetuohy	Leahy Park

3 May 1970 First round	Arravale Rovers	0-05 - 6-04	Newport	Thurles SPortsfield

3 May 1970 First round	Clonoulty–Rossmore	2-08 - 6-08	Borrisokane	Lacken Park
	J Ferncombe 1-5, T Dwyer 1-0, P Ryan 0-2, M Kennedy 0-1.		J Cahill 2-3, J McKenna 2-1, S Phelan 1-4.

3 May 1970 First round	Knockavilla Kickhams	3-05 - 6-07	St Brendan's	Lacken Park
	V Ryan 2-0, C Hayes 1-0, P Butler 0-1, J Ryan 0-1.		J Kennedy 3-0, M O'Sullivan 2-2, M O'Brien 1-1, P O'Brien 0-2, G Tierney 0-1, T King 0-1.

3 May 1970 First round	St Augustine's	2-09 - 6-07	Borris–Ileigh	Clonoulty Grounds

3 May 1970 First round	Erin go Brath	1-05 - 6-08	Toomevara	Páirc Shíleáin

3 May 1970 First round	Éire Óg Annacarty	3-02 - 7-10	Moycarkey–Borris	Clonoulty Grounds

3 May 1970 First round	Nenagh Éire Óg	1-03 - 3-11	Na Piarsaigh	MacDonagh Park
	W Condon 1-1, S English 0-1, M Kearns 0-1.		J Darcy 2-2, N Seymour 1-2, J Barry 0-2, JP McDonnell 0-2.

- Carrick Davins, Golden–Kilfeacle, Roscrea and Thurles Sarsfields received byes in this round.

=== Second round ===
7 June 1970 Second round	Kilruane MacDonaghs	2-08 - 0-10	Moyne–Templetuohy	St Cronan's Park
	B O'Shea 1-2, C Moloughney 1-0, J Williams 0-2, L Gaynor 0-2, G McCarthy 0-1, M Keogh 0-1.		M Esmonde 0-2, W O'Grady 0-2, P Sweeney 0-1, T Egan 0-1, M Troy 0-1, D Dunne 0-1, W Fogarty 0-1.

7 June 1970 Second round	Borrisokane	4-09 - 1-10	Moycarkey–Borris	St Cronan's Park
	J McKenna 2-2, S Whelan 0-4, N Brennan 1-0, E Brennan 1-0, J Cahill 0-2, T McKenna 0-1.		J Ryan 1-2, J Flanagan 0-2, W Gooney 0-2, M Gooney 0-2, P Coman 0-1, P Barry 0-1.

7 June 1970 Second round	Toomevara	6-19 - 4-07	Golden–Kilfeacle	Thurles Sportsfield
				Referee: L Ryan (Holycross)

14 June 1970 Second round	Roscrea	4-05 - 1-14	Seán Treacys	MacDonagh Park
	J Tyan 2-0, J Hannon 0-5, P Roland 1-0, M Nolan 1-0.		D Ryan 1-7, D Keane 0-3, J Keane 0-2, PJ Caplis 0-1, F Berkery 0-1.

14 June 1970 Second round	Borris–Ileigh	3-07 - 2-11	Newport	MacDonagh Park
	L Devaney 3-3, N O'Dwyer 0-3, L Carroll 0-1.		M Jones 1-3, N O'Shea 1-0, M Ryan 0-3, N O'Gorman 0-1, J O'Brien 0-1, P Jones 0-1, C Heffernan 0-1.

14 June 1970 Second round	Thurles Sarsfields	10-08 - 6-05	Na Piarsaigh	Thurles Sportsfield
				Referee: T English (Marlfield)

14 June 1970 Second round	Moneygall	1-10 - 1-12	Carrick Davins	Thurles Sportsfield
				Referee: J Moloney (Bansha)

14 June 1970 Second round	St Brendan's	2-06 - 3-13	Ballybacon–Grange	Clonoulty Grounds
	M O'Sullivan 1-2, P O'Brien 1-1, J Ryan 0-1, J Kennedy 0-1, T Gleeson 0-1.		M Keating 0-11, M Burns 1-2, J Healy 1-0, J Condon 1-0.

26 July 1970 Second round replay	Roscrea	2-16 - 0-10	Seán Treacys	MacDonagh Park
	F Loughnane 1-9, J Tynan 1-1, M Minogue 0-2, P Roland 0-1, H Loughnane 0-1, B Hogan 0-1, T O'Connor 0-1.		D Ryan 0-4, F Berkery 0-2, J Carey 0-2, P Ryan 0-1, P McLoughlin 0-1.

=== Quarter-finals ===
26 July 1970 Quarter-final	Thurles Sarsfields	5-16 - 3-09	Toomevara	MacDonagh Park
	J Doyle 0-10, P Leane 2-1, P Byrne 1-1, S McLoughlin 1-1, D Maher 1-0, J Cooke 0-2, P Doyle 0-1.		D Kennedy 2-6, P McGrath 1-2, N Maxwell 0-1.

26 July 1970 Quarter-final	Carrick Davins	2-23 - 3-07	Kilruane MacDonaghs	Thurles Sportsfield
	N Grace 0-5, R Walshe 1-1, T Ryan 1-1, J Walshe 0-4, M Roche 0-4, PJ Ryan 0-3, M Hassett 0-3, M Russell 0-2.		J Hogan 3-1, S Dwan 0-2, L O'Shea 0-1, J Williams 0-1, P Williams 0-1, J Kelly 0-1.

26 July 1970 Quarter-final	Borrisokane	5-10 - 5-10	Ballybacon–Grange	Thurles Sportsfield
	M Keating 3-8, J Healy 1-0, JJ Lonergan 1-0, J Cummins 0-1, M Burns 0-1.		J Cahill 3-0, M McKenna 2-3, S Whelan 0-2, M Brennan 0-2, T McKenna 0-2, V Duffe 0-1.

9 August 1970 Quarter-final	Newport	1-08 - 2-08	Roscrea	MacDonagh Park
	J O'Brien 1-3, M Jones 0-2, M O'Brien 0-1, C Heffernan 0-1, N O'Shea 0-1.		D Moloney 2-1, F Loughnane 0-5, P Roland 0-1, J Tynan 0-1.

23 August 1970 Quarter-final replay	Borrisokane	7-18 - 3-10	Ballybacon–Grange	Thurles Sportsfield
	J McKenna 2-7, V McKenna 3-1, T McKenna 1-4, N McDonnell 1-1, S Phelan 0-2, J Cahill 0-2, S McLoughlin 0-1.		M Keating 1-5, J Cummins 1-2, M Byrnes 1-0, P Savage 0-2, E O'Gorman 0-1.

=== Semi-finals ===
20 September 1970 Semi-final	Roscrea	5-15 - 2-09	Carrick Davins	Thurles Sportsfield
	F Loughnane 0-8, J Hannon 2-1, J Tynan 1-2, D Moloney 1-0, P Rowland 1-0, H Loughnane 0-2, B Hogan 0-1, M Nolan 0-1.		J Grace 1-0, M Hassett 1-0, M Roche 0-3, T Roche 0-3, J Walsh 0-2, PJ Ryan 0-1.

20 September 1970 Semi-final	Thurles Sarsfields	2-11 - 1-10	Borrisokane	Thurles Sportsfield
	J Doyle 0-8, P Byrne 1-1, S McLoughlin 1-0, J Cooke 0-1, TJ Semple 0-1.		T McKenna 0-5, J McKenna 1-1, S McLoughlin 0-2, N McDonnell 0-1, S Phelan 0-1.

=== Final ===
4 October 1970 Final	Roscrea	3-11 - 2-12	Thurles Sarsfields	Thurles Sportsfield
	F Loughnane 0-6, J Hannon 1-2, M Nolan 1-0, J Tynan 1-0, B Hogan 0-3.		J Doyle 1-8, S McLoughlin 1-1, TJ Semple 0-2, J Cooke 0-1.	Referee: S Moloney (Tipperary)
