= 1969 Munster Senior Club Hurling Championship =

- Dates: 22 February 1970 – 11 April 1971
- Teams: 6
- Champions: Roscrea (1st title); Patsy Rowland (captain)
- Runners-up: Glen Rovers; Denis O'Riordan (captain)

Tournament statistics
- Matches played: 5
- Goals scored: 31 (6.2 per match)
- Points scored: 73 (14.6 per match)
- Top scorer(s): Francis Loughnane (4–10)

The 1969 Munster Senior Club Hurling Championship was the sixth staging of the Munster Senior Club Hurling Championship since its establishment by the Munster Council in 1964. The championship ran from 22 February 1970 to 11 April 1971.

Newmarket-on-Fergus of Clare were the defending champions, however, they were beaten by Glen Rovers in the semi-finals. Killarney of Kerry made their championship debut.

The Munster final was played at Seán Treacy Park in Tipperary on 11 April 1971, between Roscrea of Tipperary and Glen Rovers of Cork, in what was a first championship meeting between the teams. Roscrea won the match by 3–06 to 1–09 to claim a first title.

Roscrea's Francis Loughnane was the championship's top scorer with 4–10.

== Results ==
=== First round ===
22 February 1970 First round	Roscrea	6-16 - 4-03	Killarney	St Cronan's Park
	F Loughnane 2-5, D Moloney 2-1, J Cunningham 1-3, J Tynan 0-4, B Hogan 1-0, J Hannon 0-1, H Loughnane 0-1, A Spooner 0-1.		J Culloty 3-1, T Fleming 1-1, M Spillane 0-1.

28 February 1971 First round	Patrickswell	0-08 - 2-08	Glen Rovers	Gaelic Grounds
	R Bennis 0-5, P Bennis 0-1, L Enright 0-1, S Casey 0-1.		P Harte 0-5, M Corbett 1-0, M O'Doherty 1-0, S Riordan 0-1, T O'Brien 0-1, J Young 0-1.	Referee: S O'Meara

=== Semi-finals ===
3 May 1970 Semi-final	Roscrea	3-08 - 4-03	Mount Sion	St Cronan's Park
	M Nolan 1-2, J Hannon 1-1, F Loughnane 0-4, J Tynan 1-0, M Minogue 0-1.		Stephen Greene 2-0, M Óg Morrissey 1-0, D Mahon 0-2, F Walsh 0-1.

28 March 1971 Semi-final	Glen Rovers	5-06 - 3-06	Newmarket-on-Fergus	FitzGerald Park
	T O'Brien 2-1, P Harte 1-2, L McAuliffe 1-1, J Young 1-0, M Kenneally 0-1, M Corbett 0-1.		T Ryan 2-2, J Hannan 1-1, M Arthur 0-1, J McNamara 0-1, G Lohan 0-1.

=== Final ===
11 April 1971 Final	Roscrea	3-06 - 1-09	Glen Rovers	Seán Treacy Park
	F Loughnane 2-1, A Spooner 1-0, J Cunningham 0-3, M Minogue 0-1, H Loughnane 0-1.		P Harte 1-3, J Young 0-1, D Coughlan 0-1, T O'Brien 0-1, M Corbett 0-1, L McAuliffe 0-1, S Kennefick 0-1.

== Championship statistics ==
=== Top scorers ===
Rank	Player	Club	Tally	Total	Matches	Average
1	Francis Loughnane	Roscrea	4–10	22	3	7.33
2	Patsy Harte	Glen Rovers	2–10	16	3	5.33
3	Johnny Culloty	Killarney	3–01	10	1	10.00
