= John Coffey (hurler) =

Irish hurler (1918–2019)

Personal information
- Native name: Seán Ó Cofaigh (Irish)
- Born: 14 January 1918 Boherlahan, County Tipperary, Ireland
- Died: 11 August 2019 (aged 101) County Dublin, Ireland
- Occupation: Telecom technician
- Height: 5 ft 10 in (178 cm)

Sport
- Sport: Hurling
- Position: Right corner-forward
Clubs
- Years: Club
- Boherlahan–Dualla; Young Irelands
Club titles
- Tipperary titles: 1
Inter-county
- Years: County
- 1940–1948: Tipperary
Inter-county titles
- Munster titles: 1
- All-Irelands: 1
- NHL: 0

John Coffey (14 January 1918 – 11 August 2019) was an Irish hurler. His league and championship career with the Tipperary senior spanned nine seasons from 1940 until 1948. As of 2018, he was one of only four All-Ireland hurling medallists to have become a centenarian.

Coffey made his debut on the inter-county scene at the age of sixteen when he was selected for the Tipperary minor team. He enjoyed three championship seasons with the minor team, the highlight of which was the winning of an All-Ireland medal in his debut year in 1934. Coffey subsequently joined the Tipperary junior team and played without success between 1936 and 1940. By this stage he had also joined the Tipperary senior team, making his debut during the 1940 championship. Coffey was a regular member of the starting fifteen at various times over the following nine seasons and won his sole All-Ireland medal in 1945. He also won one Munster medal. Coffey retired from inter-county hurling following the conclusion of the 1948 championship.

He died in August 2019 at the age of 101.

== Honours ==
Tipperary

- All-Ireland Senior Hurling Championship (1): 1945
- Munster Senior Hurling Championship (1): 1945
- All-Ireland Minor Hurling Championship (1): 1934
- Munster Minor Hurling Championship (1): 1934

Achievements
Preceded by Tommy Cooke	Oldest living All-Ireland medal winner 2014-2019	Succeeded by Johnny Everard
