= Séamus Hogan =

Irish hurler

Personal information
- Native name: Séamus Ó hÓgáin (Irish)
- Born: 1947 (age 78–79) Kildangan, County Tipperary, Ireland
- Height: 5 ft 11 in (180 cm)

Sport
- Sport: Hurling
- Position: Midfield
Club
- Years: Club
- Kiladangan
Club titles
- Tipperary titles: 0
College
- Years: College
- University College Galway
College titles
- Fitzgibbon titles: 1
Inter-county
- Years: County
- 1967–1969 1970 1971–1977: Tipperary; Galway; Tipperary
Inter-county titles
- Munster titles: 1
- All-Irelands: 1
- NHL: 0
- All Stars: 0

Séamus Hogan (born 1947) is an Irish former hurler. At club level he played with Kiladangan, and also lined out at inter-county level with various Tipperary teams.

== Career ==
Hogan first played hurling as a schoolboy with Kildangan NS, before later boarding at St. Flannan's College in Ennis, with whom he played in the Harty Cup. He later studied at University College Galway and captained the team to the Fitzgibbon Cup title in 1970.

At club level, Hogan enjoyed a lengthy career with Kiladangan. He won a Tipperary JHC title in 1971, while also winning four North Tipperary IHC medals.

Hogan first appeared on the inter-county scene with Tipperary as a member of the minor team in 1965. A subsequent two-year stint with the under-21 team yielded an All-Ireland medal in that grade in 1967. Hogan also made a number of appearances for the intermediate team, while making his senior team debut in a challenge game against Wexford in August 1967.

A season with the Galway senior hurling team in 1970 resulted in his selection to the Connacht team in the Railway Cup. He returned to the Tipperary senior team the following year and claimed an All-Ireland SHC medal after a defeat of Kilkenny in the 1971 All-Ireland final. Hogan continued to line out with Tipperary until 1977, during which time he also earned selection to the Munster team.

== Honours ==
University College Galway

- Fitzgibbon Cup: 1970 (c)

Kiladangan

- North Tipperary Intermediate Hurling Championship: 1966, 1971, 1977, 1980
- Tipperary Junior Hurling Championship: 1971

Tipperary

- All-Ireland Senior Hurling Championship: 1971
- Munster Senior Hurling Championship: 1971
- All-Ireland Under-21 Hurling Championship: 1967
- Munster Under-21 Hurling Championship: 1967
