= Mick Cowan =

Irish hurler

Personal information
- Native name: Mícheál Ó Comhain (Irish)
- Born: 1948 Templetuohy, County Tipperary, Ireland
- Died: 17 May 2010 (aged 61–62) Borrisoleigh, County Tipperary, Ireland
- Occupation: Publican

Sport
- Sport: Hurling
- Position: Left wing-forward
Clubs
- Years: Club
- Moyne–Templetuohy; Borris–Ileigh
Club titles
- Tipperary titles: 4
- Munster titles: 0
- All-Ireland Titles: 1
Inter-county
- Years: County
- 1969-1977: Tipperary
Inter-county titles
- Munster titles: 0
- All-Irelands: 0
- NHL: 0
- All Stars: 0

Michael Cowan (1948 – 10 May 2010) was an Irish hurler who played as a left wing-forward for the Tipperary senior team.

Regarded as one of Tipperary's most versatile players ever, Cowan joined the team during the 1969 championship and was a regular member of the starting fifteen until his retirement after the 1977 championship. His career coincided with a sharp downturn in the fortunes of the team, and he ended his playing days without any success.

At club level Cowan was a one-time All-Ireland medalist with Borris–Ileigh, after beginning his career with Moyne–Templetuohy. In addition to this he has also won four county club championship medals.

Sporting positions
| Preceded by Michael "Babs" Keating | Tipperary Senior Hurling Captain; 1972 | Succeeded by Francis Loughnane |
