= John Kelly (Tipperary hurler) =

Irish hurler (1948–2023)

Personal information
- Born: 1948 Cappawhite, County Tipperary, Ireland
- Died: 8 September 2023 (aged 75) Cappawhite, County Tipperary, Ireland
- Occupation: Secondary school teacher
- Height: 5 ft 10 in (178 cm)

Sport
- Sport: Hurling
- Position: Full-back
Clubs
- Years: Club
- Cappawhite → University College Cork; Kilruane MacDonaghs
Club titles
- Cork titles: 1
College
- Years: College
- University College Cork
College titles
- Fitzgibbon titles: 1
Inter-county
- Years: County
- 1967–1975: Tipperary
Inter-county titles
- Munster titles: 1
- All-Irelands: 1
- NHL: 1
- All Stars: 0

John Kelly (1948 – 8 September 2023) was an Irish hurler. At club level, he played with University College Cork, Cappawhite and Kilruane MacDonaghs, and he also lined out at inter-county level with various Tipperary teams.

== Playing career ==
Kelly first played hurling at juvenile and underage levels with the Cappawhite club. After winning back-to-back under-15 juvenile titles, he was part of the club's minor team that claimed their first Tipperary MAHC title in 1965. As a student, Kelly later lined out with University College Cork and won a Cork SHC medal in 1970 after a defeat of Muskerry.

Kelly first appeared on the inter-county scene with Tipperary during an unsuccessful three-year tenure with the minor team. He was a panel member in 1964 before making the starting team in 1965 and captaining the team in 1966. Kelly was in his final year with the minor team when he was drafted onto the Tipperary under-21 team. His four years in that grade yielded an All-Ireland U21HC title in 1967. He captained the team in his final year with the team in 1969.

By that stage, Kelly had already lined out with the senior team, having made his debut during the Oireachtas Tournament in 1967. He was part of the team during the successful 1967–68 National League-winning campaign but was dropped for the subsequent championship. Kelly earned a recall at the end of 1968 and immediately became first-choice full-back. He lined out in that position when Tipperary beat Kilkenny to win the All-Ireland SHC title in 1971.

Kelly also won a Railway Cup medal with Munster in 1970. He switched club allegiance by joining Kilruane MacDonaghs in 1972, however, he returned to the Cappawhite club after two unsuccessful seasons. Kelly ended his club career by winning a West Tipperary JAHC title in 1982.

== Coaching career ==
Kelly was still a player when he became involved in team management and club administration. He was a selector with the Tipperary minor team in 1979, while he also spent two different periods as a selector with the senior team. Kelly was chairman of the Cappawhite club from 1981 to 1984, served as a senior team selector and was later named Life President of the club.

== Personal life and death ==
Kelly worked as a secondary school teacher. He was principal of Cappawhite Vocational School and, following its closure, he ran a Youthreach programme before retiring in 2013. Kelly was diagnosed with a brain tumour in 2015.

Kelly died on 8 September 2023, at the age of 75.

== Honours ==
Cappawhite

- West Tipperary Junior A Hurling Championship: 1982
- Tipperary Minor A Hurling Championship: 1965
- West Tipperary Minor A Hurling Championship: 1965, 1966

University College Cork

- Fitzgibbon Cup: 1971
- Cork Senior Hurling Championship: 1970

Tipperary

- All-Ireland Senior Hurling Championship: 1971
- Munster Senior Hurling Championship: 1971
- National Hurling League: 1967–68
- Oireachtas Tournament: 1968, 1970, 1972
- All-Ireland Under-21 Hurling Championship: 1967
- Munster Under-21 Hurling Championship: 1967

Munster

- Railway Cup: 1970

Sporting positions
Preceded by	Tipperary minor hurling team captains 1966	Succeeded by
Preceded by Mick Roche	Tipperary under-21 hurling team captains 1969	Succeeded by
