= Jack Gleeson (Tipperary hurler) =

Irish hurler

John Gleeson (22 June 1910 – December 1970) was an Irish hurler. He played with his local club Roscrea and was a member of the Tipperary senior inter-county team in the late 1930s. Gleeson won a set of All-Ireland and Munster winners' medals with Tipperary in 1937.
