= 1964 All-Ireland Under-21 Hurling Championship final =

1964 All-Ireland Under-21 Hurling Championship Final
- Event: 1964 All-Ireland Under-21 Hurling Championship
Tipperary	Wexford
8-9	3-1
- Date: 4 October 1964
- Venue: Nowlan Park, Kilkenny
- Referee: Aubrey Higgins (Galway)

The 1964 All-Ireland Under-21 Hurling Championship Final was the first All-Ireland final and the culmination of the 1964 All-Ireland Under-21 Hurling Championship, an inter-county hurling tournament for players aged between 18 and 21 in Ireland. The match took place on 4 October 1964, at Nowlan Park, Kilkenny. The match was contested by Tipperary and Wexford, and it was refereed by Aubrey Higgins from Galway.

== Background ==
Naturally, the All-Ireland final was the first-ever meeting of Tipperary and Wexford at under-21 level. Both sides, however, had developed a keen rivalry at senior level since 1960. They met in two All-Ireland finals in five years, with Wexford claiming victory in 1960 and Tipp winning in 1962.

Tipperary were a team aiming to secure a unique hurling double. Just a month earlier the Tipp senior team had walloped Kilkenny to take the All-Ireland title in the top grade. Three players from that occasion, Michael 'Babs' Keating, Mick Roche and sub goalkeeper Peter O'Sullivan, were hoping to secure a second All-Ireland winners' medal in the space of a month. Wexford also had senior players in the form of Dan Quigley and Vincent Staples.

== Pre-match ==
=== Referee ===
Galway-based referee Aubrey Higgins was named as the referee for the inaugural All-Ireland under-21 final. This was his second major assignment of the year as he had earlier taken charge of the All-Ireland senior final between Tipperary and Kilkenny.

== Match ==
=== Report ===
The inaugural All-Ireland under-21 final was played as a curtain-raiser to the Oireachtas semi-final between Kilkenny and Cork.

=== Details ===
4 October
Final

Tipperary	8-9 – 3-1	Wexford
M. Keating (2-2), J. Fogarty (2-0), M. Lane (1-1), J. Dillon (1-1), T. K. Butler (1-1), M. Roche (1-0), F. Loughnane (0-3), T. Brennan (0-1).		C. Dowdall (2-1), C. Jacob (1-0).

Nowlan Park, Kilkenny
Referee: A. Higgins (Galway)

Tipperary	Wexford
