= John Gleeson =

John Gleeson may refer to:

- John Gleeson (cricketer) (1938–2016), Australian cricketer
- John Gleeson (hurler) (born 1941), former Irish hurler
- John Gleeson (judge) (born 1953), American judge
- John Gleeson (rugby league) (1938–2021), Australian rugby league footballer
- Johnny Tom Gleeson (1853–1924), Irish poet and songwriter
