= 1973 Tipperary Senior Hurling Championship =

Annual hurling competition season

- Champions: Roscrea (5th title); Francis Loughnane (captain)
- Runners-up: Kilruane MacDonaghs; Seán Hyland (captain)

The 1973 Tipperary Senior Hurling Championship was the 82nd staging of the Tipperary Senior Hurling Championship since its establishment by the Tipperary County Board in 1887.

Roscrea were the defending champions.

The final was played on 15 October 1973 at Semple Stadium in Thurles, between Roscrea and Kilruane MacDonaghs, in what was their first ever meeting in the final. Roscrea won the match by 3–14 to 3–08 to claim their fifth championship title overall and a second consecutive title.

== Results ==
=== Quarter-finals ===
16 September 1973 Quarter-final	Drom & Inch	5-07 - 1-16	Borris–Ileigh	Semple Stadium
	E Butler 2-1, J Carey 1-1, P Butler 1-1, J Harkin 0-3, O Quinn 1-0, T Butler 0-1.		B Kenny 1-5, N O'Dwyer 0-5, L Carroll 0-2, T Ryan 0-1, M Stapleton 0-1, T O'Dwyer 0-1, N Maher 0-1.

16 September 1973 Quarter-final	Roscrea	3-11 - 1-12	Carrick Davins	Semple Stadium
	F Loughnane 1-9, L Stapleton 1-0, J Tynan 1-0, R Ryan 0-1, J Cunningham 0-1.		J Walsh 0-8, T Roche 1-0, PJ Ryan 0-2, J Ryan 0-1, M Ryan 0-1.

=== Semi-finals ===
30 September 1973 Semi-final	Roscrea	5-11 - 4-07	Newport	MacDonagh Park
	J Cunningham 2-2, J Spooner 1-2, J Tynan 1-1, F Loughnane 0-4, B Stapleton 1-0, M Minogue 0-1, T O'Connor 0-1.		Joe O'Brien 1-6, C Moroney 2-0, Jimmy O'Brien 1-0, M Jones 0-1.

30 September 1973 Semi-final	Kilruane MacDonaghs	4-10 - 5-03	Drom & Inch	MacDonagh Park
	L O'Shea 2-0, L Gaynor 1-3, N Killackey 1-1, G Williams 0-3, S O'Meara 0-1, D Cahill 0-1, S Keogh 0-1.		E Butler 4-1, F Quinn 1-1, J Harkin 0-1.

=== Final ===
15 October 1973 Final	Roscrea	3-14 - 3-08	Kilruane MacDonaghs	Semple Stadium
	F Loughnane 1-4, J Cunningham 1-3, J Tynan 1-3, R Ryan 0-2, T O'Connor 0-1, J Spooner 0-1.		G Williams 1-3, S O'Meara 1-0, Jim Williams 1-0, L Gaynor 0-3, S Keogh 0-1, L O'Shea 0-1.	Referee: P Verdon (Solohead)
