= 1972 Tipperary Senior Hurling Championship =

Annual hurling competition season

- Champions: Roscrea (4th title); Jackie Hannon (captain)
- Runners-up: Borris-Ileigh; Noel O'Dwyer (captain)

The 1972 Tipperary Senior Hurling Championship was the 81st staging of the Tipperary Senior Hurling Championship since its establishment by the Tipperary County Board in 1887.

Moyne–Templetuohy were the defending champions, however, they were beaten by Roscrea in the quarter-finals.

The final was played on 12 November 1972 at Semple Stadium in Thurles, between Roscrea and Borris–Ileigh, in what was their first ever meeting in the final. Roscrea won the match by 5–08 to 3–06 to claim their fourth championship title overall and a first title in two years.

== Results ==
=== Quarter-finals ===
17 September 1972 Quarter-final	Roscrea	2-05 - 2-03	Moyne–Templetuohy	Semple Stadium

17 September 1972 Quarter-final	Borris–Ileigh	3-12 - 2-09	Carrick Davins	Semple Stadium

17 September 1972 Quarter-final	Kilruane MacDonaghs	3-08 - 3-14	Moneygall	MacDonagh Park

17 September 1972 Quarter-final	Toomevara	3-07 - 5-10	Lorrha	MacDonagh Park

=== Semi-finals ===
1 October 1972 Semi-final	Roscrea	3-11 - 1-11	Lorrha	MacDonagh Park

1 October 1972 Semi-final	Borris-Ileigh	5-08 - 5-07	Moneygall	MacDonagh Park

=== Final ===
12 November 1972 Final	Roscrea	5-08 - 3-06	Borris-Ileigh	Semple Stadium
	J Cunningham 1-5, F Loughnane 1-2, D Moloney 1-0, J Spooner 1-0, J Tynan 1-0, M Minogue 0-1.		N O'Dwyer 1-4, B Kenny 1-0, L Carroll 1-0, N Maher 0-1.	Referee: S Moloney (Bansha)
