= Elias O'Keeffe =

Irish hurler and Gaelic footballer

Personal information
- Native name: Elias Ó Caoimh (Irish)
- Nickname: Bud
- Born: 1886 Templetuohy, County Tipperary, Ireland
- Died: Unknown
- Occupation: Tailor

Sport
Clubs
- Years: Club
- Moyne–Templetuohy; Castleiney
Club titles
	Football	Hurling
Tipperary titles	1	0
Inter-county
- Years: County
- 1915 1907-1915: Tipperary (football); Tipperary (hurling)
Inter-county titles
	Football	Hurling
Munster Titles	0	1
All-Ireland Titles	0	0

Elias "Bud" O'Keeffe (born 1886) was an Irish hurler and Gaelic footballer who played for the Tipperary senior teams.

O'Keeffe made his first appearance for the Tipperary hurling team during the 1907 championship and was a regular member of the starting fifteen until he left the panel after the 1915 championship. During that time he won one Munster medal. O'Keeffe was an All-Ireland runner-up on one occasion. He also enjoyed one season as captain of the Tipperary football team.

At club level O'Keeffe played with Moyne–Templetuohy and was a one-time county football championship medallist with Castleiney.
