= John Coghlan (hurler) =

Irish sportsperson

Personal information
- Born: 6 January 1989 (age 37) County Tipperary
- Occupation: Teacher

Sport
- Sport: Hurling
- Position: Defender
Club
- Years: Club
- Moyne–Templetuohy
Inter-county
Years	County	Apps (scores)
2011–	Tipperary	1 (0-00)
Inter-county titles
- Munster titles: 0
- All-Irelands: 0
- NHL: 0

John Coghlan (born 6 January 1989) is an Irish sportsperson. He plays hurling with his local club Moyne–Templetuohy and with the Tipperary senior inter-county team.

== Career ==
Coghlan won an All-Ireland Minor Hurling medal with Tipperary in 2007, and an All-Ireland Under 21 Hurling Championship medal in 2010. He also won a Munster Under-21 Football Championship winners medal in 2010 with Tipperary, their first ever title.

He made his senior Tipperary hurling debut in the fourth round of the league on 13 March 2011, coming on at half time against Offaly in a 1–20 to 0–10 win. He made his Championship debut against Clare in the 2011 Munster Senior Hurling Championship on 19 July 2011, coming on as a substitute for Paul Curran in the last minute in a 4–19 to 1–19 win.

== Honours ==
=== Tipperary ===
- All-Ireland Minor Hurling Championship:
  - Winner (1): 2007
- Munster Minor Hurling Championship:
  - Winner (1): 2007
- Munster Under-21 Hurling Championship:
  - Winner (1): 2010
- All-Ireland Under 21 Hurling Championship:
  - Winner (1): 2010
