= 1970–71 All-Ireland Senior Club Hurling Championship =

All-Ireland Senior Club Hurling Championship 1970–71
Championship Details
- Dates: 24 January 1971 – 19 December 1971

All Ireland Champions
- Winners: Roscrea (1st win)
- Captain: Donie Moloney

All Ireland Runners-up
- Runners-up: St. Rynagh's
- Captain: Ray Horan

Provincial Champions
- Munster: Roscrea
- Leinster: St. Rynagh's
- Ulster: Loughgiel Shamrocks
- Connacht: Liam Mellows

Championship Statistics
- Top Scorer: Joe Tynan (8–08)

The 1970–71 All-Ireland Senior Club Hurling Championship was the inaugural staging of the All-Ireland Senior Club Hurling Championship, the Gaelic Athletic Association's premier inter-county club hurling tournament. The championship ran from 24 January to 19 December 1971.

The All-Ireland final was played at St Brendan's Park in Birr on 19 December 1971, between Roscrea of Tipperary and St Rynagh's of Offaly, in what was a first championship meeting between the teams. Roscrea won the match by 4–05 to 2–05 to claim a first title.

Roscrea's Joe Tynan was the championship's top scorer with 8–08.

== Connacht Senior Club Hurling Championship ==
=== Connacht final ===
28 March 1971 Final	Roscommon Gaels	2–05 – 4–10	Liam Mellows	Athleague Sportsfield

== Leinster Senior Club Hurling Championship ==
=== Leinster first round ===
10 April 1971 First round	Éire Óg	2–04 – 7–09	Faughs	St Conleth's Park

11 April 1971 First round	Buffer's Alley	6–08 – 3–09	Arklow Rock Parnells	Gorey Grounds

=== Leinster quarter-finals ===
11 April 1971 Quarter-final	Clonad	2–06 – 1–12	St Rynagh's	O'Moore Park
	L Conroy 1-2, G Conroy 1-0, D Rowe 0-2, J Whelan 0-1, F Fogarty 0-1.		B Moylan 0-6, G Burke 1-0, P Mulhare 0-3, B Lyons 0-2, R Horan 0-1.

11 April 1971 Quarter-final	The Fenians	7–14 – 1–01	Erin's Own	Nowlan Park
	T O'Connell 3–0, P Broderick 2–3, F Houlihan 1–4, B Watson 1–1, J Moriarty 0–3, D Walsh 0–1, P Henderson 0–1, M Garrett 0–1.		L Doyle 1–1.

11 April 1971 Quarter-final	St Brigid's	3–08 – 4–05	Athboy	Cusack Park
	O Egan 1–7, C Gavin 1–1, K Gavin 1–0.		J Doherty 2–2, M Mullen 1–0, P Andrews 1–0, S Speight 0–2, P Geraghty 0–1.

5 May 1971 Quarter-final replay	Athboy	3–10 – 3–03	St Brigid's	St Loman's Park
	J Doherty 2–5, M Mangan 1–0, M Mullen 0–2, T Ennis 0–2, S Speight 0–1.		O Egan 2–3, C Gavin 1–0.

5 May 1971 Quarter-final	Buffer's Alley	1–11 – 2–07	Faughs	Parnell Park
	W Murphy 0–7, J Kavanagh 1–0, P Butler 0–2, M Kinsella 0–1, M Casey 0–1.		J Bennett 1–1, F Condon 1–1, S Buckley 0–2, L White 0–1, C Muldoon 0–1, S White 0–1.

=== Leinster semi-finals ===
12 May 1971 Semi-final	St Rynagh's	1–12 – 0–12	The Fenians	St Brendan's Park
	R Horan 1-2, B Lyons 0-3, J Whelehan 0-3, G Burke 0-2, P Moylan 0-1, B Johnson 0-1.

13 June 1971 Semi-final	Buffer's Alley	6–18 – 1–05	Athboy	Croke Park
	M Butler 3–4, T Doran 1–2, M Casey 0–5, P Butler 1–1, J Hall 1–1, B Murphy 0–4, J Murphy 0–1.		J Doherty 0–4, P Foy 1–0, T Ennis 0–1.

=== Leinster final ===
1 August 1971 Final	St Rynagh's	4–10 – 2–09	Buffer's Alley	Croke Park
	G Burke 1–4, B Moylan 1–3, P Mulhaire 1–0, B Lyons 1–0, S Moylan 0–2, B Johnston 0–1.		M Butler 1–2, J Hall 1–0, W Murphy 0–3, M Casey 0–3, P Butler 0–1.

== Munster Senior Club Hurling Championship ==
=== Munster quarter-finals ===
24 January 1971 Quarter-final	Clarecastle	3–06 – 3–06	Patrickswell	Dr Daly Park
	D Fitzgerald 1–2, C Guinnane 1–1, M Slattery 1–0, P Russell 0–2, T Slattery 0–1.		J Shiels 1–1, S Casey 1–0, P Carey 1–0, R Bennis 0–3, L Foley 0–2.

7 February 1971 Quarter-final	Roscrea	10–09 – 1–08	Kilmoyley	St Cronan's Park
	J Tynan 3-2, F Loughnane 2-2, J Cunningham 1-3, D Moloney 1-1, H Loughnane 1-1, W Stapleton 1-0, M Minogue 1-0.		D Lovett 1-6, JM Brick 0-1, J Flanagan 0-1.	Referee: D Nealon (Tipperary)

21 February 1971 Quarter-final replay	Patrickswell	3–06 – 5–02	Clarecastle	Gaelic Grounds
	R Bennis 0–4, P Carey 1–0, M O'Connell 1–0, J Shields 1–0, F Nolan 0–1, P Bennis 0–1.		G Horan 2–0, C Hanrahan 1–1, T Guinane 1–1, D Fitzgerald 1–0.

=== Munster semi-finals ===
21 February 1971 Semi-final	Roscrea	3–10 – 1–10	Ballyduff-Portlaw	St Cronan's Park
	J Tynan 2–2, H Loughnane 1–1, J Cunningham 0–4, P Roland 0–2, D Moloney 0–1.		John Kirwan 1–4, D Power 0–3, W Kiely 0–2, M Regan 0–1.

28 March 1971 Semi-final	University College Cork	2–11 – 3–08	Clarecastle	FitzGerald Park
	M Crotty 1–1, J Darcy 1–0, T Buckley 0–3, E Fitzpatrick 0–3, R Cummins 0–2, D Walsh 0–1, H O'Sullivan 0–1.		P Kelly 1–0, P Condon 1–0, F McNamara 1–0, D Fitzgerald 0–3, C Guinane 0–3, P Russell 0–1, T Slattery 0–1.	Referee: S O'Grady (Limerick)

30 July 1971 Semi-final replay	University College Cork	2–05 – 3–07	Clarecastle	FitzGerald Park
	R Cummins 1–3, H O'Sullivan 1–1, J Darcy 0–1.		D Fitzgerald 1–2, C Guinane 1–2, H Russell 1–1, G Comane 0–2.

=== Munster final ===
18 August 1971 Final	Roscrea	4–11 – 1–06	Clarecastle	Gaelic Grounds
	F Loughnane 1–5, L Spooner 1–3, D Moloney 1–1, J Cunningham 1–0, J Tynan 0–1, J Spooner 0–1.		D Fitzgerald 1–2, C Guinane 0–1, P Russell 0–1, T Slattery 0–1, P Higgins 0–1.	Referee: S O'Connor (Limerick)

=== Ulster Senior Club Hurling Championship ===
Final

18 July 1971 Final	Loughgiel Shamrocks	6–15 – 2–05	Ballygalget	Fr Healy Park
	B McGarry 2-5, S Richmond 1-2, B Campbell 1-2, G McGarry 1-2, P Carey 1-0, S McMullan 0-2, JP McFadden 0-1.		M Roddy 1-2, G McGrattan 1-0, S Bailie 0-1, W Smyth 0-1.

== All-Ireland Senior Club Hurling Championship ==
=== All-Ireland semi-finals ===
14 November 1971 Semi-final	Roscrea	6–10 – 2–08	Loughgiel Shamrocks	Fr Healy Park
	T Dynan 2-0, J Tynan 1-3, J Crompton 1-1, F Dooley 1-1, B Stapleton 1-0, J Hannon 0-3, M Moloney 0-1, M Shanahan 0-1.		S Richmond 1-5, B Campbell 1-0, JP McFadden 0-2, G McGarry 0-1.

Semi-final	St Rynagh's	w/o – scr.	Liam Mellows

=== All-Ireland final ===
19 December 1971 Final	Roscrea	4–05 – 2–05	St Rynagh's	St Brendan's Park
	J Tynan 2–0, J Cunningham 1–0, M Nolan 1–0, F Loughnane 0–3, P Roland 0–2.		B Moylan 1–2, B Johnston 1–1, P Mulhaire 0–1, B Lyons 0–1.	Referee: F Murphy (Cork)

== Statistics ==
=== Miscellaneous ===
- Roscrea became the second team to retain the Munster Club Championship title, following a 4–11 to 1–06 defeat of Clarecastle in the final.
