= 1934 All-Ireland Minor Hurling Championship =

1934 sporting competition in Ireland

All-Ireland Minor Hurling Championship 1934
All Ireland Champions
- Winners: Tipperary (4th win)

All Ireland Runners-up
- Runners-up: Laois

Provincial Champions
- Munster: Tipperary
- Leinster: Laois
- Ulster: Down
- Connacht: Galway

The 1934 All-Ireland Minor Hurling Championship was the seventh staging of the All-Ireland Minor Hurling Championship since its establishment by the Gaelic Athletic Association in 1928.

Tipperary entered the championship as the defending champions.

On 2 September 1934 Tipperary won the championship following a 4-3 to 3-5 defeat of Laois in the All-Ireland final. This was their third All-Ireland title in-a-row and their fourth overall.

== Results ==
=== All-Ireland Minor Hurling Championship ===
Semi-finals

5 August 1934 Semi-final	Tipperary	8-08 - 1-00	Galway	St. Cronan's Park, Roscrea

26 August 1934 Semi-final	Laois	17-10 - 2-01	Down	Drogheda Park, Drogheda

Final

2 September 1934 Final	Tipperary	4-03 - 3-05	Laois	Croke Park, Dublin

== Championship statistics ==
=== Miscellaneous ===
- The All-Ireland semi-final between Laois and Down remains their only championship meeting.
- Tipperary became the first team to win three successive All-Ireland Championship titles.
