= John O'Donoghue (hurler) =

Irish hurler

Personal information
- Born: 1942 (age 83–84) Tipperary, County Tipperary, Ireland
- Occupation: Insurance agent
- Height: 6 ft 1 in (185 cm)

Sport
- Sport: Dual player
- Position: Goalkeeper
Clubs
- Years: Club
- Arravale Rovers; University College Cork
Club titles
- Cork titles: 1
College
- Years: College
- University College Cork
Inter-county
- Years: County
- 1962-1972 1964-1975: Tipperary (SH); Tipperary (SF)
Inter-county titles
- Munster titles: 5
- All-Irelands: 3
- NHL: 3
- All Stars: 0

John O'Donoghue (born 1942) is an Irish former hurler, Gaelic footballer and coach. At club level he played with Arravale Rovers, and also lined out at inter-county level with various Tipperary teams.

== Playing career ==
O'Donoghue first played Gaelic games as a student at the Abbey CBS in Tipperary. He was part of the school team that won the Harty Cup in 1959. O'Donoghue later lined out with University College Cork and won consecutive Fitzgibbon Cups and a Cork SHC medal in 1963.

At club level, O'Donoghue had a lengthy career as a dual player with Arravale Rovers. After winning a Tipperary MFC title in 1959, he later claimed West Tipperary SHC and SFC titles with the club's senior team.

O'Donoghue first appeared on the inter-county scene with Tipperary during a two-year tenure as a dual player at minor level. He was goalkeeper when Tipperary won the All-Ireland MHC title in 1959, before serving as team captain in his final year in the grade. A brief spell at under-21 level was followed by O'Donoghue becoming a dual player at senior level. He was part of the Tipperary senior hurling team that made a clean sweep of National League, Munster SHC and All-Ireland SHC titles in 1964 and 1965.

O'Donoghue won five Munster SHC titles in all and, after claiming a third National Hurling League medal in 1968, won a National Football League Division 2 title in 1971. He was a non-playing substitute when he claimed a third All-Ireland SHC medal later that year. O'Donoghue also won a total of four Railway Cup medals as a dual player with Munster.

== Management career ==
O'Donoghue replaced Theo English as a selector with the Tipperary senior hurling team in 1990. As part of the management team, he helped guide Tipperary to the All-Ireland SHC title in 1991. O'Donoghue was still a selector when Tipperary won a second Munster SHC during his tenure in 1993, before winning the National Hurling League title in 1994.

== Honours ==
=== Player ===
Abbey CBS

- Harty Cup: 1959

University College Cork

- Fitzgibbon Cup: 1962, 1963
- Cork Senior Hurling Championship: 1963

Arravale Rovers

- West Tipperary Senior Hurling Championship: 1966, 1970
- West Tipperary Senior Football Championship: 1972, 1973
- Tipperary Minor Football Championship: 1959

Tipperary

- All-Ireland Senior Hurling Championship: 1964, 1965, 1971
- Munster Senior Hurling Championship: 1964, 1965, 1967, 1968, 1971
- National Hurling League: 1963–64, 1964–65, 1967–68
- National Football League Division 2: 1970–71
- All-Ireland Minor Hurling Championship: 1959
- Munster Minor Hurling Championship: 1959, 1960 (c)

Munster

- Railway Cup (F): 1972
- Railway Cup (H): 1966, 1969, 1970

=== Management ===
Tipperary

- All-Ireland Senior Hurling Championship: 1991
- Munster Senior Hurling Championship: 1991, 1993
- National Hurling League: 1993–94
