= Dinny Ryan (hurler) =

Irish hurler

Personal information
- Native name: Donncha Ó Riain (Irish)
- Born: 1927 Roscrea, County Tipperary, Ireland
- Died: 28 September 2009 (aged 82) Roscrea, County Tipperary, Ireland

Sport
- Sport: Hurling
Club
- Years: Club
- Roscrea
Club titles
- Tipperary titles: 0
Inter-county
- Years: County
- 1949-1950: Tipperary
Inter-county titles
- Munster titles: 0
- All-Irelands: 0
- NHL: 0

Denis "Dinny" Ryan (1927 – 28 September 2009) was an Irish hurler who played for the Tipperary senior team.

Ryan joined the team during the 1949 championship and was a regular member of the extended panel for just two seasons. During that time he won one All-Ireland medal and one Munster medal as a non-playing substitute.

At club level Ryan was a multiple North Tipperary divisional medalist with Roscrea.

His brothers, Mick and Jack Ryan, also played with Tipperary.
