= 1933 All-Ireland Minor Hurling Championship =

All-Ireland Minor Hurling Championship 1933
All Ireland Champions
- Winners: Tipperary (3rd win)
- Captain: Joe Fletcher

All Ireland Runners-up
- Runners-up: Galway

Provincial Champions
- Munster: Tipperary
- Leinster: Kilkenny
- Ulster: Antrim
- Connacht: Galway

The 1933 All-Ireland Minor Hurling Championship was the sixth staging of the All-Ireland Minor Hurling Championship since its establishment by the Gaelic Athletic Association in 1928.

Tipperary entered the championship as the defending champions.

On 8 October 1933 Tipperary won the championship following a 4–6 to 2–3 defeat of Galway in the All-Ireland final. This was their second All-Ireland title in-a-row and their third overall.

== Results ==
=== All-Ireland Minor Hurling Championship ===
Semi-finals

| 27 August 1933 Semi-final | Galway | 8-00 - 1-01 | Antrim | Breffni Park, Cavan |

| 27 August 1933 Semi-final | Tipperary | 11-06 - 4-02 | Kilkenny | Gaelic Grounds, Limerick |

Final

| 8 October 1933 Final | Tipperary | 4-06 - 2-03 | Galway | Waterford Sportsfield, Waterford |

== Championship statistics ==
=== Miscellaneous ===
- Tipperary became the first team to complete back-to-back All-Ireland Championship titles.
