= 1985 All-Ireland Junior Hurling Championship =

All Ireland Champions
- Winners: Wexford (1st win)
- Captain: John Walsh

All Ireland Runners-up
- Runners-up: Tipperary
- Captain: Liam McGrath

Provincial Champions
- Munster: Tipperary
- Leinster: Wexford
- Ulster: Cavan
- Connacht: Not Played

The 1985 All-Ireland Junior Hurling Championship was the 64th staging of the All-Ireland Junior Championship since its establishment by the Gaelic Athletic Association in 1912.

Kilkenny entered the championship as the defending champions, however, they were beaten in the Leinster Championship.

The All-Ireland final was played on 18 August 1985 at Nowlan Park in Kilkenny, between Wexford and Tipperary, in what was their first ever meeting in a final. Wexford won the match by 3-09 to 1-13 to claim their first ever championship title.

== Results ==
=== All-Ireland Junior Hurling Championship ===
==== All-Ireland semi-finals ====
20 July 1985 Semi-final	Tipperary	8-20 - 1-03	Galway	Semple Stadium

28 July 1985 Semi-final	Galway	1-12 - 2-13	Wexford	Ballinasloe Sportsfield

==== All-Ireland final ====
18 August 1985 Final	Wexford	3-09 - 1-13	Tipperary	Nowlan Park
