= 1968 Tipperary Senior Hurling Championship =

Annual hurling competition season

- Dates: 8 September – 13 October 1968
- Teams: 8
- Champions: Roscrea (1st title); John Dillon (captain)
- Runners-up: Thurles Sarsfields; Benny Maher (captain)

Tournament statistics
- Matches played: 7
- Goals scored: 33 (4.71 per match)
- Points scored: 121 (17.29 per match)
- Top scorer(s): Francis Loughnane (1–14)

The 1968 Tipperary Senior Hurling Championship was the 77th staging of the Tipperary Senior Hurling Championship since its establishment by the Tipperary County Board in 1887. The championship ran from 8 September to 13 October 1968.

Carrick Davins were the defending champions, however, they failed to qualify after being beaten by Marlfield in the South Tipperary SHC semi-final.

The final was played on 13 October 1968 at Thurles Sportsfield, between Roscrea and Thurles Sarsfields, in what was their fourth meeting in the final overall. Roscrea won the match by 2–13 to 3–04 to claim their first ever championship title.

Roscrea's Francis Loughnane was the championship's top scorer with 1–14.

== Qualification ==
Championship	Champions	Second team
Mid Tipperary Senior Hurling Championship	Thurles Sarsfields	Moyne–Templetuohy
North Tipperary Senior Hurling Championship	Roscrea	Borris–Ileigh
South Tipperary Senior Hurling Championship	Ballybacon–Grange	Marlfield
West Tipperary Senior Hurling Championship	Seán Treacy's	Éire Óg Annacarty

== Results ==
=== Quarter-finals ===
8 September 1968 Quarter-final	Thurles Sarsfields	3-13 - 1-05	Éire Óg Annacarty	Leahy Park
	P Doyle 0-6, P Butler 1-2, S McLoughlin 1-1, J Duggan 1-0, P Byrne 0-2, TJ Semple 0-1, P Dorney 0-1.		J Hanley 1-1, P Corbett 0-2, H Cummins 0-1, J Cummins 0-1.

8 September 1968 Quarter-final	Moyne–Templetuohy	2-14 - 2-12	Seán Treacy's	Leahy Park
	M Grady 1-2, T Egan 0-5, M Troy 1-1, P Sweeney 0-4, M Coen 0-1, W Grady 0-1.		J Keane 0-5, J Quigley 1-1, M Ryan 1-0, E Moloughney 0-3, T Ryan 0-3.

15 September 1968 Quarter-final	Borris–Ileigh	4-11 - 1-07	Ballybacon–Grange	Thurles Sportsfield
	N Dwyer 3-2, O Ryan 1-0, L Devaney 0-3, K McDonnell 0-2, M Delaney 0-2, M Stapleton 0-1, J Loughnane 0-1.		M Keating 1-5, B Mahon 0-1, L Myles 0-1.

15 September 1968 Quarter-final	Roscrea	5-15 - 1-02	Marlfield	Thurles Sportsfield
	F Loughnane 1-4, J Tynan 1-4, M Nolan 2-0, J Hannon 1-2, L Brussels 0-5.		T English 1-1, M O'Connor 0-1.

=== Semi-finals ===
29 September 1968 Semi-final	Thurles Sarsfields	2-07 - 2-05	Borris–Ileigh	MacDonagh Park
	P Butler 0-4, G Hogan 1-0, S McLoughlin 1-0, T Wall 0-1, J Doyle 0-1, P Byrne 0-1.		L Devaney 1-4, O Ryan 1-0, J Loughnane 0-1.

29 September 1968 Semi-final	Roscrea	3-07 - 2-06	Moyne–Templetuohy	MacDonagh Park
	J Tynan 1-1, M Nolan 1-0, B Hogan 1-0, F Loughnane 0-3, P Roland 0-2, J Hannon 0-1.		T Egan 1-2, M O'Grady 1-0, W O'Grady 0-2, B O'Grady 0-2.

=== Final ===
13 October 1968 Final	Roscrea	2-13 - 3-04	Thurles Sarsfields	Thurles Sportsfield
	F Loughnane 0-7, J Tynan 1-1, H Loughnane 1-0, L Spooner 0-2, J Hannon 0-1, L Brussels 0-1, M Nolan 0-1.		J Doyle 1-1, P Byrne 1-1, S McLoughlin 1-0, P Dorney 0-1, T Wall 0-1.	Referee: S Moloney (Bansha)

== Championship statistics ==
=== Top scorers ===
Rank	Player	Club	Tally	Total	Matches	Average
1	Francis Loughnane	Roscrea	1-14	17	3	5.66
2	Joe Tynan	Roscrea	3-06	15	3	5.00
3	Noel O'Dwyer	Borris–Ileigh	3-02	11	2	5.50
4	Seán McLoughlin	Thurles Sarsfields	3-01	10	3	3.33
4	Mick Nolan	Roscrea	3-01	10	3	3.33
4	Tom Egan	Moyne–Templetuohy	1-07	10	2	5.00
4	Liam Devaney	Borris–Ileigh	1-07	10	2	5.00
