= 1960 All-Ireland Minor Hurling Championship =

All-Ireland Minor Hurling Championship 1960
All Ireland Champions
- Winners: Kilkenny (5th win)
- Captain: Billy Grace

All Ireland Runners-up
- Runners-up: Tipperary
- Captain: John O'Donoghue

Provincial Champions
- Munster: Tipperary
- Leinster: Kilkenny
- Ulster: Antrim
- Connacht: Roscommon

The 1960 All-Ireland Minor Hurling Championship was the 30th staging of the All-Ireland Minor Hurling Championship since its establishment by the Gaelic Athletic Association in 1928.

Tipperary entered the championship as the defending champions.

On 4 September 1960 Kilkenny won the championship following a 7-12 to 1-11 defeat of Tipperary in the All-Ireland final. This was their fifth All-Ireland title and their first in ten championship seasons.

== Results ==
=== Leinster Minor Hurling Championship ===
Final

24 July 1960 Final	Kilkenny	6-14 - 5-5	Wexford	Croke Park, Dublin

=== Munster Minor Hurling Championship ===
Final

31 July 1960 Final	Tipperary	6-7 - 4-3	Galway	Thurles Sportfield, Thurles

=== Leinster Minor Hurling Championship ===
Semi-finals

19 June 1960 Semi-final	Cork	5-7 - 3-7	Clare	FitzGerald Park, Kilmallock

3 July 1960 Semi-final	Tipperary	2-9 - 2-8	Limerick	Athletic Grounds, Cork

Final

17 July 1960 Final	Tipperary	6-13 - 2-3	Clare	Gaelic Grounds, Limerick

=== Ulster Minor Hurling Championship ===
Final

24 July 1960 Final	Antrim	16-4 - 1-0	Donegal	Casement Park, Belfast

=== All-Ireland Minor Hurling Championship ===
Semi-final

14 August 1960 Semi-final	Antrim	3-3 - 5-11	Tipperary	Casement Park, Belfast

Final

4 September 1960 Final	Kilkenny	7-12 - 1-11	Tipperary	Croke Park, Dublin
				Referee: P Cronin (Clare)
