= Phil Cullen =

Irish retired sportsperson

Personal information
- Native name: Pilib Ó Cuilinn (Irish)
- Born: Bennettsbridge, County Kilkenny

Sport
- Sport: Hurling
- Position: Midfield
Club
- Years: Club
- 1950s-1970s: Bennettsbridge
Inter-county
- Years: County
- 1971-1973: Kilkenny
Inter-county titles
- Leinster titles: 2 (1 as sub)
- All-Irelands: 0
- All Stars: 0

Phil Cullen (born 1943 in Bennettsbridge, County Kilkenny) is an Irish retired sportsperson. He played hurling with his local club Bennettsbridge and was a member of the Warwickshire and Kilkenny senior inter-county teams in the 1960s and 1970s.
