= Mossy Murphy =

Irish hurler

Personal information
- Native name: Muiris Ó Murchú (Irish)
- Born: Mullinavat, County Kilkenny

Sport
- Sport: Hurling
- Position: Forward
Club
- Years: Club
- Mullinavat
Inter-county
- Years: County
- 1970s: Kilkenny
Inter-county titles
- Leinster titles: 1
- All-Irelands: 1

Mossy Murphy is a retired Irish sportsperson. He played hurling with his local club Mullinavat and was a member of the Kilkenny senior inter-county team in the 1970s. With Kilkenny, Murphy won All-Ireland and Leinster titles in 1972.
