= John Gleeson (hurler) =

Irish hurler

Personal information
- Native name: Seán Ó Glíasáin (Irish)
- Born: 1941 (age 84–85) Moneygall, County Offaly, Ireland
- Height: 5 ft 9 in (175 cm)

Sport
- Sport: Hurling
- Position: Left corner-back
Club
- Years: Club
- Moneygall
Club titles
- Tipperary titles: 2
Inter-county
- Years: County
- 1966-1974: Tipperary
Inter-county titles
- Munster titles: 2
- All-Irelands: 1
- NHL: 0
- All Stars: 0

John Gleeson (born 1941) is an Irish retired hurler who played as a right corner-back for the Tipperary senior team.

Gleeson joined the team during the 1966 championship and was a regular member of the starting fifteen until his retirement after the 1974 championship. During that time he won one All-Ireland medal and two Munster medals.

At club level Gleeson was a double county club championship medalist with Moneygall.
