= 1969 Tipperary Senior Hurling Championship =

Annual hurling competition season

- Champions: Roscrea (2nd title); Michael Hogan (captain)
- Runners-up: Carrick Davins

The 1969 Tipperary Senior Hurling Championship was the 78th staging of the Tipperary Senior Hurling Championship since its establishment by the Tipperary County Board in 1887.

Roscrea were the defending champions.

On 26 October 1969, Roscrea won the championship after a 4–13 to 0–05 defeat of Carrick Davins in the final at Thurles Sportsfield. It was their second championship title overall and their second title in succession.

== Results ==
=== First round ===
6 July 1969 First round	Toomevara	10-09 - 2-02	Kilsheelan–Kilcash	Thurles Sportsfield

6 July 1969 First round	Newport	8-09 - 2-03	Cappawhite	St Michael's Park

6 July 1969 First round	Shannon Rovers	4-05 - 1-06	Ballybacon–Grange	Thurles Sportsfield

=== Second round ===
3 August 1969 Second round	Borrisokane	4-06 - 2-06	Drom & Inch	Páirc Shíleáin

3 August 1969 Second round	Moyne–Templetuohy	v	Borris–Ileigh	St Michael's Park

3 August 1969 Second round	Cashel King Cormacs	3-08 - 1-04	Moneygall	St Michael's Park

3 August 1969 Second round	Moycarkey–Borris	1-14 - 4-02	Kilruane MacDonaghs	Páirc Shíleáin

10 August 1969 Second round	Marlfield	5-06 - 1-07	Nenagh Éire Óg	Páirc Ciocaim

24 August 1969 Second round	Newport	2-05 - 2-04	Seán Treacy's	MacDonagh Park

24 August 1969 Second round	Shannon Rovers	5-06 - 4-06	Éire Óg Annacarty	MacDonagh Park

24 August 1969 Second round	St Brendan's	3-09 - 6-08	Moycarkey–Borris	MacDonagh Park

=== Third round ===
24 August 1969 Third round	Wild Rovers	0-07 - 4-08	Lorrha	Páirc Shíleáin

24 August 1969 Third round	Thurles Sarsfields	2-04 - 2-12	Roscrea	Páirc Shíleáin

31 August 1969 Third round	Carrick Davins	0-09 - 1-06	Cashel King Cormacs	Clonmel GAA Ground

31 August 1969 Third round	Newport	13-12 - 3-02	Gortnahoe–Glengoole	Thurles Sportsfield

31 August 1969 Third round	Moycarkey–Borris	3-13 - 4-06	Shannon Rovers	Bishop Quinlan Park

31 August 1969 Third round	Moyne–Templetuohy	0-15 - 0-09	Marlfield	Thurles Sportsfield

14 September 1969 Third round	Golden–Kilfeacle	4-04 - 5-16	Toomevara	Thurles Sportsfield

14 September 1969 Third round	Arravale Rovers	1-07 - 4-10	Borrisokane	Thurles Sportsfield

21 September 1969 Third round replay	Carrick Davins	4-10 - 1-09	Cashel King Cormacs	Thurles Sportsfield

=== Quarter-finals ===
5 October 1969 Quarter-final	Carrick Davins	1-13 - 2-06	Newport	Thurles Sportsfield

5 October 1969 Quarter-final	Moyne–Templetuohy	3-12 - 1-05	Moycarkey–Borris	Thurles Sportsfield

5 October 1969 Quarter-final	Lorrha	1-12 - 1-10	Toomevara	MacDonagh Park

5 October 1969 Quarter-final	Roscrea	4-11 - 3-07	Borrisokane	MacDonagh Park

=== Semi-finals ===
12 October 1969 Quarter-final	Moyne–Templetuohy	1-06 - 2-08	Carrick Davins	Leahy Park

12 October 1969 Semi-final	Roscrea	2-12 - 3-04	Lorrha	MacDonagh Park

=== Final ===
26 October 1969 Final	Roscrea	4-13 - 0-05	Carrick Davins	Thurles Sportsfield
