= Mick Ryan (hurler, born 1925) =

Irish hurler and Gaelic footballer

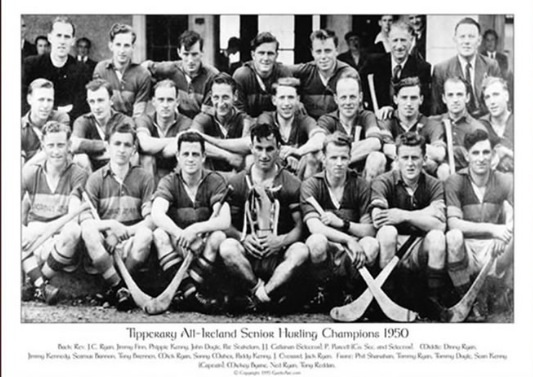

Personal information
- Native name: Mícheál Ó Riain (Irish)
- Born: Roscrea, County Tipperary

Sport
- Sport: Hurling and Gaelic Football
- Position: Forward
Clubs
- Years: Club
- Roscrea, Dicksboro, St John's, Blackrock, St Finbarr's, Clonakilty, Munster
Inter-county
- Years: County
- 1946-1954: Tipperary
Inter-county titles
- Munster titles: 3
- All-Irelands: 3

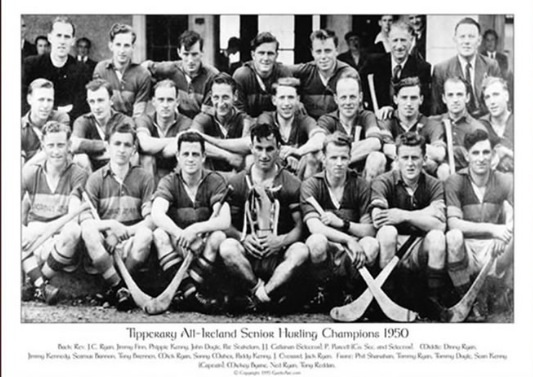
Ryan on the Tipperary Senior Hurling Panel in 1950, that year's All Ireland Senior Hurling Champions. Ryan is located fifth from the left in the middle row.

Mick Ryan (2 June 1925–7 December 2007) was an Irish sportsperson. He played hurling at various times with the Roscrea, Dicksboro, Blackrock and St Finbarr's clubs and was a member at senior level of the Tipperary county team from 1946 until 1954.

Mick Ryan was born in Roscrea, County Tipperary, Ireland, in 1925. He played inter-county hurling for his native, Tipperary from 1946 to 1955, picking up three All Ireland Senior Hurling Championships in a row. He played for various clubs in Tipperary, Kilkenny and Cork. Ryan also played Gaelic football for St. John's, after moving to Kilkenny after World War II, and for Clonakilty after moving to Cork in the 1950s, picking up a Kilkenny Senior Football Championship and a Cork Senior Football Championship. After retiring from GAA (Gaelic Athletics Association) Ryan started playing golf.

In 1955, Ryan purchased Frankfield House, and worked the farmland around the area. In the late 1970s, Ryan built an extension to the house, and licensed it for the sale of alcohol. Ryan also transformed the land around into a golf course, which was established in 1981. The official golf club was set up in 1984, which Ryan competed for in many competitions.

Mick Ryan died on 7 December 2007, aged 82 years old.

== Playing career ==
=== Inter-county ===
Ryan later lined out in his first championship decider at Croke Park where Laois, the surprise winners of the Leinster championship, provided the opposition. The game turned into a rout as Tipp trounced Laois on a score line of 3–11 to 0-3 giving Ryan his first All-Ireland medal. In 1950 Ryan collected a second consecutive National League title before adding a second Munster title to his collection following a victory over arch-rivals Cork.

This victory allowed Tipp to advance to the All-Ireland final where Kilkenny were the opponents. It was Tipp, however, who won a close and uninteresting final on a score line of 1–9 to 1-8 giving Ryan his second All-Ireland medal. 1951 saw Tipp aim to capture a third championship in-a-row. The year began well with the Premier County getting the better of Cork in the Munster final.

That victory gave Ryan his third provincial title and allowed Tipp to play in their third consecutive championship decider. Wexford took on Tipp in that game, however, victory went to the Munstermen on a score line of 7–7 to 3–9. Ryan had captured his third consecutive All-Ireland medal. With the three-in-a-row under their belt the men from Tipperary launched an all out bid to capture a fourth championship in-a-row. Things started well in 1952 with Ryan winning a third National League title. Tipperary, however, were later beaten by Cork in a thrilling Munster final. In 1954 Ryan won a fourth National League medal; however, Cork went on to defeat Tipp in a third consecutive Munster final. Ryan retired from inter-county hurling shortly after this.

=== Provincial ===
Ryan also lined out with Munster in the inter-provincial hurling competition. He won Railway Cup titles in 1950, 1951, 1952 and 1957.
