= Frank Murphy (sports administrator) =

Irish Gaelic games referee and administrator

Secretary of the Cork County Board
- In office 1 January 1973 – 17 December 2018
- Preceded by: Con Murphy
- Succeeded by: Kevin O'Donovan

Personal details
- Born: May 1944 (age 81) Blackrock, County Cork, Ireland
- Occupation: Gaelic games administrator

Frank Murphy (born May 1944) is an Irish Gaelic games administrator and former referee. He was secretary of the Cork County Board of the Gaelic Athletic Association 1972 to 2018 and has served on numerous Gaelic games committees at national level.

Murphy is seen as the most powerful figure in Gaelic games in Cork. At times he has been viewed as a divisive figure due to his central involvement in all three strikes by the Cork senior hurling team and Cork senior football team between 2002 and 2009.

Murphy previously served as a referee at the highest levels, taking charge of numerous All-Ireland deciders, while he was also a selector at all levels with various Cork Gaelic football and hurling teams.

Sporting positions
Preceded by Con Murphy	Secretary of the Cork County Board; 1973–2018	Succeeded by Kevin O'Donovan
Achievements
Preceded by Jimmy Hatton	All-Ireland SHC Final referee 1971	Succeeded by Mick Spain
Preceded by Newly created championship	All-Ireland Club SHC Final referee 1971	Succeeded by Noel Dalton
Preceded by Noel O'Donoghue	All-Ireland SHC Final referee 1981	Succeeded by Noel O'Donoghue
Preceded by Pascal Long	All-Ireland MHC Final referee 1984	Succeeded by Séamus Brennan
