= Roscrea GAA =

Gaelic sports club in County Tipperary, Ireland

Roscrea
- Ros Cré
- Founded: 1895
- County: Tipperary
- Colours: Red and white
- Grounds: St Cronan's Park
- Coordinates: 52°58′05.52″N 7°47′12.94″W

Playing kits
Standard colours

Senior Club Championships
| | All Ireland | Munster champions | Tipperary champions |
|---|---|---|---|
| Hurling: | 1 | 2 | 6 |

Roscrea GAA is a Gaelic Athletic Association club in Roscrea, County Tipperary, Ireland. The club is affiliated to the North Tipperary Board and is primarily concerned with the game of hurling.

== History ==
Located in the town of Roscrea, on the Tipperary-Offaly border, Roscrea GAA Club was founded in 1895. The club spent most of its early existence operating in the junior grade in the various North Tipperary competitions. Roscrea had their breakthrough success in 1936 when the club claimed their first North Tipperary SHC title.

Roscrea's breakthrough at county level came when the club won three successive Tipperary SHC titles between 1968 and 1970. The club also claimed back-to-back Munster Club SHC titles at this time. On 19 December 1971, Roscrea beat St Ryangh's by 4-05 to 2-05 to become the inaugural winners of the All-Ireland Club SHC title. The club won further Tipperary SHC titles in 1972, 1973 and 1980.

== Honours ==
- All-Ireland Senior Club Hurling Championship (1): 1971
- Munster Senior Club Hurling Championship (2): 1969, 1970
- Tipperary Senior Hurling Championship (6): 1968, 1969, 1970, 1972, 1973, 1980
- North Tipperary Senior Hurling Championship (17): 1936, 1937, 1939, 1941, 1942, 1945, 1949, 1954, 1963, 1967, 1968, 1969, 1970, 1971, 1980, 1982, 2004
- Tipperary Premier Intermediate Hurling Championship (1): 2022
- Tipperary Junior A Hurling Championship (3): 1982, 1986, 2015
- Tipperary Junior B Hurling Championship (1): 2012
- Tipperary Under-21 Hurling Championship (5): 1963, 1964, 1968, 1983, 1984
- Tipperary Minor A Hurling Championship (10): 1958, 1959, 1960, 1961, 1962, 1963, 1966, 1967, 1984, 2017
- North Tipperary Junior A Hurling Championship (5): 1930, 1942, 1946, 1982, 1986
- North Tipperary Junior A Football Championship (3): 1918, 1925, 1926
- North Tipperary Junior B Hurling Championship (1): 2012
- North Tipperary Under-21 A Hurling Championship (7): 1961, 1962, 1963, 1964, 1968, 1983, 1984
- North Tipperary Minor A Hurling Championship (32): 1928, 1929, 1930, 1931, 1934, 1935, 1943, 1944, 1945, 1946, 1950, 1958, 1959, 1960, 1961, 1962, 1963, 1965, 1966, 1967, 2017 1968, 1974, 1975, 1976, 1980, 1983, 1984, 1988, 1999, 2001, 2003, 2017

== Notable players ==
- Kieran Carey: All-Ireland SHC-winner (1958, 1961, 1962, 1964, 1965)
- John Carroll: All-Ireland SHC-winner (2001)
- Paul Delaney: All-Ireland SHC-winner (1989, 1991)
- John Dillon: All-Ireland SHC-winner (1965)
- Jack Gleeson: All-Ireland SHC-winner (1937)
- Francis Loughnane: All-Ireland SHC-winner (1971)
- Martin Loughnane: All-Ireland SHC-winner (1945)
- Tadhg O'Connor: All-Ireland SHC-winner (1971)
- Dinny Ryan: All-Ireland SHC-winner (1950)
- Mick Ryan: All-Ireland SHC-winner (1949, 1950, 1951)
- Roger Ryan: All-Ireland SHC-winner (1971)
- Alan Tynan: All-Ireland SHC-winner (2025
