= St Cronan's Park =

GAA stadium in County Tipperary, Ireland

St Cronan's Park is a GAA stadium in Roscrea, County Tipperary, Ireland. It is the main ground of Roscrea GAA's Gaelic football and hurling teams. The ground is named after St Cronan, patron of the diocese of Roscrea, and has hosted six All-Ireland Senior Hurling Championship semi-finals.

== See also ==
- List of Gaelic Athletic Association stadiums
