= Moyne–Templetuohy GAA =

Gaelic games club in County Tipperary, Ireland

- Cumann Iomanaíochta agus Peil Maighean agus Teampall na Tuaithe
- Founded: 1887
- County: Tipperary
- Colours: Green and Gold

Playing kits
Standard colours

Moyne–Templetuohy GAA is a Gaelic Athletic Association club that is centred on the adjoining parishes of Templetuohy and Moyne in County Tipperary, Ireland. As part of Tipperary GAA, the club participates in hurling and Gaelic football leagues and championships of the Board's Mid Tipperary division. It also participates in the county-wide competitions. While several sports are played, hurling is predominant in the club.

== History ==
Shortly after the foundation of the GAA in 1884, separate clubs were formed in Moyne and Templetuohy. Moyne's hurlers defeated Tullaroan (of Kilkenny) in Johnstown by 2-2 to nil in the club's first known match in 1887. Templetuohy played Gortnahoe on the same day.

The clubs continued as separate entities for almost 50 years, with Templetuohy allying with Castleiney in the 1910s to play as 'Templetuohy and Castleiney United'. In 1936, however, a 'Moyne and Templetuohy' hurling club affiliated to Tipperary GAA along with a 'Templetuohy and Moyne' football club.

In 1938, the local GAA secured ownership of the long-established Gaelic games grounds from the owners of the Longorchard estate. A new club, Moyne–St Albert's, had a brief existence in the parish in the 1950s.

In 1991 the club began a new phase with the amalgamation of the separate hurling and football clubs in the parish. The present name was adopted, with Longorchard as the grounds. In 1999 a new clubhouse was opened, and a second pitch.

The club is involved in Scór.

== Hurling ==
In 1914 Templetuohy and Castleiney United won the Mid and County Championships. Moyne recorded their first championship success in the Mid Junior Hurling Championship of 1917. In 1918, they defeated Ileigh in the Intermediate final.

In 1936 the newly-amalgamated Moyne and Templetuohy club lost the Mid Tipperary Senior Hurling final to Thurles Sarsfields. In the 1940s the club reached two Mid hurling finals.

Moyne recorded its first senior championship defeat of then-dominant Thurles Sarsfields in the Mid semi-final of 1966. In 1970 Moyne–Templetuohy won the Mid-Tipperary Senior Hurling Championship for the first time. The club went on to win its only county Senior Hurling title to date in 1971, with a 2-8 to 0-6 victory over Roscrea. The club won the Mid Senior Hurling Championship in 1976 and 1977, and the county Intermediate Championship in 1983.

=== Honours ===
- Tipperary Senior Hurling Championship (1)
  - 1971
- Tipperary Intermediate Hurling Championship (3)
  - 1983, 2014, 2021
- Mid Tipperary Senior Hurling Championship (4)
  - 1970, 1972, 1976, 1977
- Mid Tipperary Intermediate Hurling Championship (5)
  - 1982, 1983, 2001, 2002, 2004, 2019, 2021,
- Tipperary Junior A Hurling Championship (3)
  - 1961, 1965, 1990
- Mid Tipperary Junior A Hurling Championship (7)
  - 1917 (as Moyne), 1923 (as Templetuohy), 1930 (as Moyne), 1961, 1965, 2010, 2015
- Tipperary Junior B Hurling Championship (2)
  - 2001, 2008
- Mid Tipperary Junior B Hurling Championship (2)
  - 2001, 2008
- Mid Tipperary Under-21 A Hurling Championship (4)
  - 1965, 1973, 1975, 1985 (as Moyne-Gortnahoe)
- Tipperary Under-21 B Hurling Championship (2)
  - 2011 (as Moyne–Templetuohy Og), 2013 (as Moyne–Templetuohy Og)
- Mid Tipperary Under-21 B Hurling Championship (5)
  - 2001, 2003, 2010, 2011 (as Moyne–Templetuohy Og), 2013 (as Moyne–Templetuohy Og) 2018,
- Tipperary Minor A Hurling Championship (1)
  - 1964
- Mid Tipperary Minor A Hurling Championship (3)
  - 1964, 1965, 1966
- Tipperary Minor B Hurling Championship (2)
  - 1987, 2009 (as Moyne–Templetuohy Og)
- Mid Tipperary Minor B HurlingChampionship (2)
  - 1987, 2009 (as Moyne–Templetuohy Og) 2017 (Moyne Templetuohy Gaels)
- Mid Tipperary u21 B football

=== Notable players ===
- Hugh Coghlan, Tipperary senior footballer, 2006–
- John Coghlan – Tipperary player at Minor, U-21 and Senior levels, 2007–
- Mick Cowan
- Jim Fogarty
- Tom Fogarty – Tipperary player (1960s–70s), later Tipperary and Offaly hurling manager
- Tomás Hamill – All-Ireland Senior Hurling winner 2016
- Paul Maher – All-Ireland Minor Hurling winner 2012, All-Ireland Senior Hurling winner 2019
- Elias O'Keeffe – the first Templetuohy player to join a Tipperary team when he was selected by county champions, Toomevara (1913)

== Gaelic football ==
Templetuohy won the Mid Tipperary Senior Football Championship in 1911 and 1912, but lost the 1911 county championship final to Nenagh. An amalgamated Castleiney-Templetuohy team lost the 1915 final, again to Nenagh.

In the 1940s the club contested four Mid Senior Football Championship finals. After winning the Mid in 1949, Templetuohy met Galtee Rovers in the county final. Although Galtee Rovers won the match, the title was awarded to Templetuohy due to irregularities with the Rovers team. In 1950, Templetuohy retained the Mid title.

In 1980 Templetuohy won the Tipperary Junior Football Championship, defeating Arravale Rovers in the final. Promotion to the Intermediate ranks was immediately rewarded with a Championship title in 1981. The club next won the Mid Senior Championship in 1986 and 2001, defeating Loughmore–Castleiney on both occasions. The clubs met again in the 2007 and 2008 finals, both won by Loughmore–Castleiney.

=== Honours ===
- Tipperary Senior Football Championship (1)
  - 1949(as Templetuohy)
- Tipperary Intermediate Football Championship (3)
  - 1981, 2005, 2018
- Mid Tipperary Senior Football Championship (6)
  - 1911 (as Templetuohy), 1912 (as Templetuohy), 1949 (as Templetuohy), 1950, 1986, 2001
- Mid Tipperary Intermediate Football Championship (7)
  - 1981, 1982 (as Templetuohy), 1995, 1996, 2004, 2005, 2016
- Mid Tipperary Junior A Football Championship (12)
  - 1936 (as Templetuohy), 1940 (as Templetuohy), 1941 (as Templetuohy), 1942 (as Templetuohy), 1952 (as Templetuohy), 1964, 1965, 1971, 1973, 1974, 1977, 1980
- Mid Tipperary Junior B Football Championship (1)
  - 2018
- Mid Tipperary Under-21 A Football Championship (9)
  - 1967, 1968, 1973, 1975, 1983, 2000, 2001, 2002, 2003
- Tipperary Under-21 B Football Championship (1)
  - 1996
- Mid Tipperary Under-21 B Football Championship (2)
  - 1990, 1996
- Mid Tipperary Minor A Football Championship (1)
  - 1996
- Tipperary Minor B Football Championship (1)
  - 2005
- Mid Tipperary Minor B Football Championship (4)
  - 1994, 2005, 2008, 2010

2017 (Moyne Templetuohy Gaels)

Note - in some cases the team is shown as Templetuohy–Moyne in football competitions.

== Ladies' Gaelic football ==
The club a Ladies' Football section, fielding several girls' teams.
