= 1971 All-Ireland Senior Hurling Championship =

Championship details
- Dates: 16 May – 5 September 1971
- Teams: 15

All-Ireland champions
- Winning team: Tipperary (22nd win)
- Captain: Tadhg O'Connor

All-Ireland Finalists
- Losing team: Kilkenny
- Captain: Pat Henderson

Provincial champions
- Munster: Tipperary
- Leinster: Kilkenny
- Ulster: Not Played
- Connacht: Not Played

Championship statistics
- No. matches played: 14
- Top Scorer: Eddie Keher (4–43)
- Player of the Year: Michael 'Babs' Keating
- All-Star Team: See here

The 1971 All-Ireland Senior Hurling Championship was the 84th staging of the All-Ireland Senior Hurling Championship, the Gaelic Athletic Association's premier inter-county hurling tournament. The championship began on 16 May 1971 and ended on 5 September 1971.

Cork were the defending champions but were defeated by Limerick in the Munster semi-final. Antrim, who won the All-Ireland Intermediate Hurling Championship in 1970, were promoted to the senior championship after a long absence.

The All-Ireland final was played at Croke Park in Dublin on 5 September 1971 between Tipperary and Kilkenny, in what was their 16th championship meeting overall and a first meeting in the All-Ireland final four years. Tipperary won the match by 5–17 to 5–14 to claim their 22nd All-Ireland title overall and a first title in six years.

Kilkenny's Eddie Keher was the championship's top scorer with 4–43. Tipperary's Michael 'Babs' Keating was the choice for Texaco Hurler of the Year.

== The championship ==
=== Participating counties ===
| Province | County | Most recent success | |
| Province | County | All-Ireland | Provincial |
|---|---|---|---|
| Leinster | Dublin | 1938 | 1961 |
| | Kildare | | |
| | Kilkenny | 1969 | 1969 |
| | Laois | 1915 | 1949 |
| | Offaly | | |
| | Westmeath | | |
| | Wexford | 1968 | 1970 |
| Munster | Clare | 1914 | 1932 |
| | Cork | 1970 | 1970 |
| | Limerick | 1940 | 1955 |
| | Tipperary | 1965 | 1968 |
| | Waterford | 1959 | 1963 |
| Connacht | Galway | 1923 | 1922 |
| Ulster | Antrim | | 1946 |
| Britain | London | 1901 | |

=== Format ===
The All-Ireland Senior Hurling Championship of 1971 was run on a provincial basis as usual. It was a knockout tournament with pairings drawn at random in the respective provinces – there were no seeds.

Each match was played as a single leg. If a match was drawn there was a replay. If both sides were still level at the end of that game another replay had to take place.

==== Munster Championship ====
Quarter-final: (1 match) This was a single match between the first two teams drawn from the province of Munster.

Semi-finals: (2 matches) The winner of the lone quarter-final joined the other three Munster teams to make up the semi-final pairings.

Final: (1 match) The winner of the two semi-finals contested this game.

==== Leinster Championship ====
First round: (1 match) This was a single match between two of the 'weaker' teams drawn from the province of Leinster.

Quarter-finals: (2 matches) The winner of the first-round game joined three other Leinster teams to make up the two quarter-final pairings.

Semi-finals: (2 matches) The winners of the two quarter-finals joined Kilkenny and Wexford, who received a bye to this stage, to make up the semi-final pairings.

Final: (1 match) The winner of the two semi-finals contested this game.

==== All-Ireland Championship ====
Quarter-final: (1 match) This was a single match between Antrim and Galway, two teams who faced no competition in their respective provinces.

Semi-finals: (2 matches) The winner of the lone quarter-final joined London and the Munster and Leinster champions to make up the semi-final pairings. The provincial champions were drawn in opposite semi-finals.

Final: (1 match) The winner of the two semi-finals contested this game.

== Provincial championships ==
=== Leinster Senior Hurling Championship ===
First round

16 May 1971
First round

| Westmeath | 3–9 – 1–10 | Kildare |
|---|---|---|
| T. Ring (2–1), Pete Loughlin (1–1), J. Keary (0–3), W. Shanley (0–2), Mick Flanagan (0–2). | | J. Walsh (1–9), T. Carew (0–1). |

O'Connor Park, Tullamore
Referee: D. Kirwan (Offaly)

Quarter-finals

16 May 1971
Quarter-final

| Dublin | 2–14 – 1–11 | Laois |
|---|---|---|
| M. Bermingham (0–5), W. Pierce (1–0), F. Murphy (1–0), J. Kenny (0–3), H. Dalton (0–2), P. Pierce (0–2), B. Cooney (0–1), G. O'Driscoll (0–1). | | P. Dowling (1–3), P. Bates (0–4), B. Delaney (0–3), F. Bates (0–1). |

O'Connor Park, Tullamore
Referee: M. Spain (Offaly)

6 June 1971
Quarter-final

| Offaly | 1–20 – 1–15 | Westmeath |
|---|---|---|
| B. Moylan (0–8), Barry (0–4), J. Flaherty (0–4), P. J. Whelehan (1–0), A. Hanniffy (0–2), M. Cleere (0–2). | | T. Ring (0–10), C. Gavin (1–0), M. Flanagan (0–2), J. Keary (0–1), Fanning (0–1), L. Maher (0–1). |

St. Brendan's Park, Birr
Referee: C. Foley (Dublin)

Semi-finals

20 June 1971
Semi-final

| Kilkenny | 3–14 – 1–13 | Dublin |
|---|---|---|
| E. Keher (2–7), M. Brennan (0–4), K. Purcell (1–0), P. Delaney (0–2), N. Byrne (0–1). | | J. Kenny (0–4), M. Bermingham (0–4), B. Cooney (1–0), P. Pierce (0–2), D. Rheinisch (0–1), G. O'Driscoll (0–1), H. Dalton (0–1). |

Dr. Cullen Park, Carlow
Attendance: 5,000
Referee: J. Kirwan (Offaly)

27 June 1971
Semi-final

| Wexford | 2–14 – 2–6 | Offaly |
|---|---|---|
| T. Doran (2–1), T. Byrne (0–4), C. Dowdall (0–3), D. Bernie (0–3), C. Kehoe (0–3). | | P. Molloy (1–3), J. Kirwan (1–0), J. Flaherty (0–2), M. Cleare (0–1). |

Croke Park, Dublin
Attendance: 5,000
Referee: J. Rankins (Laois)

Final

11 July 1971
Final

| Kilkenny | 6–16 – 3–16 | Wexford |
|---|---|---|
| E. Keher (0–11), M. Murphy (2–2), P. Delaney (2–0), M. Coogan (1–0), N. Byrne (1–0), K. Purcell (0–1), P. Cullen (0–1), M. Brennan (0–1). | | C. Kehoe (1–7), T. Doran (1–1), T. Byrne (1–0), J. Quigley (0–3), D. Bernie (0–3), M. Quigley (0–1), C. Doran (0–1). |

Croke Park, Dublin
Referee: J. Rankins (Laois)

=== Munster Senior Hurling Championship ===
Quarter-finals

30 May 1971
Quarter-final

| Limerick | 3–10 – 2–8 | Waterford |
|---|---|---|
| R. Bennis (1–5), M. Cregan (1–1), É. Cregan (1–1), É. Grimes (0–2), J. O'Donnell (0–1). | | P. Enright (0–5), M. Ormond (1–1), S. Greene (1–0), A. Heffernan (0–1), J. Kirwan (0–1). |

Cork Athletic Grounds, Cork
Referee: F. Murphy (Cork)

Semi-finals

4 July 1971
Semi-final

| Limerick | 2–16 – 2–14 | Cork |
|---|---|---|
| R. Bennis (1–8), D. Flynn (1–1), J. Foley (0–2), É. Grimes (0–2), M. Graham (0–1), É. Cregan (0–1), J. O'Donnell (0–1). | | C. Kelly (0–7), R. Cummins (2–0), J. Horgan (0–2), C. Roche (0–1), S. Looney (0–1), P. Hegarty (0–1), M. Malone (0–1), J. McCarthy (0–1). |

Semple Stadium, Thurles
Attendance: 32,000
Referee: J. Maloney (Tipperary)

11 July 1971
Semi-final

| Tipperary | 1–15 – 3–4 | Clare |
|---|---|---|
| M. Keating (1–3), L. Gaynor (0–3), S. Hogan (0–3), J. Flanagan (0–2), N, O'Dwyer (0–1), P. J. Ryan (0–1), F. Loughnane (0–1), T. O'Connor (0–1). | | J. Rochford (1–1), M. Moroney (1–0), N. Casey (1–0), T. Ryan (0–1), P. Russell (0–1), M. Pewter (0–1). |

Gaelic Grounds, Limerick
Attendance: 13,000
Referee: S. O'Connor (Limerick)

Final

25 July 1971
Final

| Tipperary | 4–16 – 3–18 | Limerick |
|---|---|---|
| M. Keating (3–4), J. Flanagan (0–5), P. J. Ryan (1–0), F. Loughnane (0–3), L. Gaynor (0–2), J. Doyle (0–1), N. O'Dwyer (0–1) | | R. Bennis (0–12), É. Cregan (1–2), É. Grimes (1–1), D. Flynn (1–0), M. Graham (0–2), B. Hartigan (0–1) |

FitzGerald Stadium, Killarney
Attendance: 31,118
Referee: F. Murphy (Cork)

== All-Ireland Senior Hurling Championship ==
=== All-Ireland quarter-finals ===
25 July 1971
Quarter-final

| Galway | 7–24 – 1–8 | Antrim |
|---|---|---|
| D. Coen (3–4), T. Ryan (1–7), J. Lane (2–1), P. Ryan (1–1), J. Connolly (0–4), P. Fahy (0–3), P. Mitchell (0–2), C. Muldoon (0–1), T. Murphy (0–1). | | S. Burns (1–2), A. McAllin (0–4), S. Collins (0–2). |

McHale Park, Castlebar
Referee: J. Rankins (Laois)

=== All-Ireland semi-finals ===
15 August 1971
Semi-final

| Kilkenny | 2–23 – 2–8 | London |
|---|---|---|
| E. Keher (0–14), P. Delaney (1–2), M. Murphy (1–1), M. Brennan (0–4), F. Cummins (0–1), K. Purcell (0–1). | | F. Canning (1–4), N. Power, (1–0), L. Corless (0–2), T. Connolly (0–2). |

Croke Park, Dublin
Attendance: 2,000
Referee: C. Foley (Dublin)

15 August 1971
Semi-final

| Tipperary | 3–26 – 6–8 | Galway |
|---|---|---|
| M. Keating (2–12), F. Loughnane (0–7), J. Flanagan (1–2), N. O'Dwyer (0–3), S. Hogan (0–1), J. Ryan (0–1). | | P. Fahy (2–3), P. Ryan (2–0), B. O'Connor (1–1), P. Mitchell (1–1), J. Connolly (0–2), D. Coen (0–1). |

St. Brendan's Park, Birr
Attendance: 15,022
Referee: J. Rankins (Laois)

=== All-Ireland Final ===
5 September 1971

Final

| Tipperary | 5–17 – 5–14 | Kilkenny |
|---|---|---|
| M. Keating (0–7), R. Ryan (2–0), J. Flanagan (1–2), D. Ryan (1–1), F. Loughnane (0–4), N. O'Dwyer (1–0), P.J. Ryan (0–2), P. Byrne (0–1). | | E. Keher (2–11), M. Murphy (1–1), K. Purcell (1–0), N. Byrne (1–0), F. Cummins (0–2). |

Croke Park, Dublin
Attendance: 61,393
Referee: F. Murphy (Cork)

== Championship statistics ==
=== Scoring ===
- Widest winning margin: 34 points
  - Galway 7–24 : 1–8 Antrim (All-Ireland quarter-final)
- Most goals in a match: 10
  - Tipperary 5–17 : 5–14 Kilkenny (All-Ireland final)
- Most points in a match: 34
  - Tipperary 3–26 : 6–8 Galway (All-Ireland semi-final)
- Most goals by one team in a match: 7
  - Galway 7–24 : 1–8 Antrim (All-Ireland quarter-final)
- Most goals scored by a losing team: 6
  - Galway 6–8 : 3–26 Tipperary (All-Ireland semi-final)
- Most points scored by a losing team: 18
  - Limerick 3–18 : 4–16 Tipperary (Munster final)

=== Miscellaneous ===
- The All-Ireland final between Tipperary and Kilkenny was the first championship decider to be broadcast in colour by Telefís Éireann. Some years later, it was revealed that RTÉ had recorded over its only copy of archive footage of the game, due to a shortage of blank cassette tape.
- Kilkenny's Eddie Keher set a new scoring record in an All-Ireland final. He scored 2–11 of his team's total of 5–14 yet, remarkably, ended up on the losing team.

== Top scorers ==
=== Season ===
| Rank | Player | County | Tally | Total | Matches | Average |
|---|---|---|---|---|---|---|
| 1 | Eddie Keher | Kilkenny | 4–43 | 55 | 4 | 13.75 |
| 2 | Michael 'Babs' Keating | Tipperary | 6–26 | 44 | 4 | 11.00 |
| 3 | Richie Bennis | Limerick | 2–25 | 31 | 3 | 10.33 |
| 4 | Tommy Ring | Westmeath | 2–11 | 17 | 4 | 4.25 |
| 4 | John Flanagan | Tipperary | 2–11 | 17 | 2 | 8.50 |
| 6 | Mossy Murphy | Kilkenny | 4–04 | 16 | 4 | 4.00 |
| 7 | Francis Loughnane | Tipperary | 0–15 | 15 | 4 | 3.75 |
| 8 | Des Coen | Galway | 3–05 | 14 | 2 | 7.00 |
| 9 | Pat Delaney | Kilkenny | 3–04 | 13 | 4 | 3.25 |
| 9 | Christy Keogh | Wexford | 1–10 | 13 | 2 | 6.50 |

=== Single game ===
| Rank | Player | County | Tally | Total | Opposition |
|---|---|---|---|---|---|
| 1 | Michael 'Babs' Keating | Tipperary | 2–12 | 18 | Galway |
| 2 | Eddie Keher | Kilkenny | 2–11 | 17 | Tipperary |
| 3 | Eddie Keher | Kilkenny | 0–14 | 14 | London |
| 4 | Michael 'Babs' Keating | Tipperary | 3-04 | 13 | Limerick |
| 4 | Des Coen | Galway | 3-04 | 13 | Antrim |
| 4 | Eddie Keher | Kilkenny | 2-07 | 13 | Dublin |
| 5 | Johnny Walsh | Kildare | 1-09 | 12 | Westmeath |
| 5 | Richie Bennis | Limerick | 0–12 | 12 | Tipperary |
| 6 | Richie Bennis | Limerick | 1-08 | 11 | Cork |
| 6 | Eddie Keher | Kilkenny | 0–11 | 11 | Wexford |

== Player facts ==
=== Debutantes ===
The following players made their début in the 1971 championship:

| Player | Team | Date | Opposition | Game |
|---|---|---|---|---|
| Seánie O'Leary | Cork | July 4 | Limerick | Munster semi-final |

=== Retirees ===
The following players played their last game in the 1971 championship:

| Player | Team | Date | Opposition | Game | Début |
|---|---|---|---|---|---|
| Ollie Walsh | Kilkenny | September 5 | Tipperary | All-Ireland final | 1956 |
