= Francis Loughnane =

Irish hurler

Personal information
- Native name: Prionsias Ó Lachtnáin (Irish)
- Born: 24 June 1945 (age 81) Roscrea, County Tipperary, Ireland
- Height: 5 ft 8 in (173 cm)

Sport
- Sport: Hurling
- Position: Right wing-forward
Club
- Years: Club
- 1962-1985: Roscrea
Club titles
- Tipperary titles: 6
- Munster titles: 2
- All-Ireland Titles: 1
Inter-county
| Years | County | Apps (scores) |
| 1968-1979 | Tipperary | 19 (6-59) |
Inter-county titles
- Munster titles: 1
- All-Irelands: 1
- NHL: 1
- All Stars: 3

Francis Loughnane (born 24 June 1945) is an Irish retired hurler who played as a wing-forward for the Tipperary senior team.

Loughnane made his first appearance for the team during the 1968 championship and became a regular player over the course of the following decade. During that time he won one All-Ireland winner's medal, one Munster winner's medal, one National League winner's medal and three All-Star awards.

At club level, Loughnane is an All-Ireland medalist with Roscrea. In addition to this he has also won two Munster club winners' medals and six county championship winners' medals.

== Playing career ==
=== Club ===
Loughnane played his club hurling with Roscrea and enjoyed much success in a senior career that lasted more than twenty years.

He won his first county championship winners' medal in 1968, beginning a great era of success for the club.

In 1969 Roscrea retained the county championship title before Loughnane subsequently added a Munster club winners' medal to his collection.

A second set of county and provincial titles were annexed by Roscrea in 1970. Loughnane later lined out in the inaugural All-Ireland club final with St. Rynagh's providing the opposition. A 4–5 to 2–5 victory gave him an All-Ireland club winners' medal.

Roscrea continued to be a major force in club hurling over the next decade with Loughnane winning further county championship titles in 1972, 1973 and 1980. He brought the curtain down on his senior club career following a defeat by Kilruane MacDonagh's in the 1985 club championship decider.

When journalists decided, in 1996, to select a team of players to celebrate the 25th anniversary of the All-Ireland Club Hurling Championship (a team based on performances at club level) Francis Loughnane was the only Tipperary player chosen. He was honoured in his accustomed position of right half-forward.

=== Inter-county ===
By the early 1960s Loughnane had joined the Tipperary minor hurling panel. He won a Munster minor medal in 1962, however, he failed to win an All-Ireland medal at this level. Two years later in 1964 Loughnane captained Tipperary to inaugural Munster and All-Ireland under-21 titles. He won a second Munster under-21 title in 1965.

Three years later in 1968 Loughnane was a substitute when Tipp won the Munster senior title. Roscrea's period of dominance in Tipperary hurling meant that he was Tipperary senior hurling captain in 1969 and 1970. By 1971 he was a full member of the team and won his first senior Munster title. Loughnane later won his first All-Ireland title when Tipp defeated Kilkenny in a high-scoring game. He finished off the year by winning the first of three consecutive All-Star awards (1971–73). In 1973, Loughnane captained Tipperary when they reached the Munster final. In a classic thriller, Loughnane scored 2-10 but ended on the losing side as a last minute Richie Bennis point gave Limerick a one-point win on a scoreline of 6–7 to 2–18. The rest of the 1970s proved to be a bleak period for Tipperary's hurling fortunes, however, Loughnane finished off his career by winning a National Hurling League medal in 1979.

In 2009, he was ranked 111 of all-time greatest Irish hurlers by the Irish Independent.

Sporting positions
| Preceded by Mick Roche | Tipperary Senior Hurling Captain; 1969-1970 | Succeeded by Tadhg O'Connor |
| Preceded by Mick Cowan | Tipperary Senior Hurling Captain; 1973 | Succeeded by Roger Ryan |
Achievements
| Preceded by Newly created competition | All-Ireland Under-21 Hurling Final winning captain 1964 | Succeeded by Willie O'Neill |
