= Ecovillages in China =

Ecovillages in China are typically rural communities designed to promote ecological, cultural, economic, and social sustainability, in concert with the natural environment of a particular area. These are small human settlements with a community-based approach designed by the community themselves. Ecovillages are not completely isolated from other settlements, although they aspire to increased self-sufficiency.

== Overview ==
=== Definitions ===
Many scholars have proposed different definitions of ecovillages. However, the primary accepted definition of an ecovillage is an intentional village that has a focus on sustainability.

The Global Ecovillage Network (GEN) defines ecovillages as an intentional, traditional, or urban community that incorporates the four dimensions of sustainability to rebuild and regenerate the social and natural environment.

Robert Gilman is a thinker on sustainability whose work is instrumental in defining the ecovillage movement, as well as influencing the direction of the GEN purpose. Gilman defines ecovillages as a human-scale, full-featured settlement that incorporates human activities with the natural world in a harmless and sustainable manner that is supportive of human development while also being able to be continued into the indefinite future.

Diana Michelle Fischetti is the author of "Building Resistance from Home: Ecovillage at Ithaca as a Model of Sustainable Living". In her book, she defines ecovillages as "an intentional community whose members strive to live in a socially and environmentally sustainable manner, to practice voluntary simplicity, and to cultivate meaning, life satisfaction, and fulfillment."

Kosha Anja Joubert (former executive director of GEN) works around the world to help develop strategy and outreach in relation to GEN through methods such as curriculum development, training teams, international collaboration, and sustainable development. She defines ecovillages as a "way to rebuild fragmented villages and communities, establish new groups and enterprises and heal the wounds of conflict and social division…".

=== Top Down vs Bottom Up ===
Eco-villages in China can generally be categorized as top-down or bottom-up. Top-down villages receive funding and organization from the government, whereas bottom-up villages are founded by community members. Most Western theories about ecovillages generally only focus on bottom-up villages. Unlike ecovillages in many other countries, top-down ecovillages in China are generally more common than bottom-up ecovillages. In the development of top-down villages, the main goal is to satisfy the criteria of the ecovillage assessment standards set by the government (see sections on government involvement and evaluation criteria).

=== Ecovillage Organizations in China ===
These organizations are not sponsored by the Chinese government and promote the formation of bottom-up villages.

The Global Ecovillage Network (GEN) works to connect ecovillages from around the world that share three common core practices. These include: being rooted in local participatory practices, integrating different types of sustainability in an approach to sustainable development, and being active in restoring and regenerating the natural environment in which they are located. Approximately 10,000 communities and/or projects are associated with this organization. Within the GEN Oceania & Asia branch (GENOA), there are 11 villages or learning projects affiliated with GENOA within China and Taiwan. Ecovillages help countries as well as local towns and communities to better implement the UN Sustainable Development Goals and Climate Agreements.

The Sunshine Ecovillage Network (三生谷) was created in 2015 and is based at the Sunshine Ecovillage in Hangzhou, China. They help to promote and educate the public about the ecovillage movement in China and their goal is to sponsor the development of 100 ecovillages in China by 2020. The Sunshine Ecovillage Network is a member of the Global Ecovillage Network (GEN), the United Nations Education, Scientific, and Cultural Organization (UNESCO), and the China Ecovillage Network (CEN).

== History ==
The concept of an ecovillage was first conceptualized in Sweden at an international conference about sustainable communities in 1995. The Global Ecovillage Network (GEN) was also created during this same meeting as a way to build a community of sustainable villages and ecovillages from around the globe.

=== Urbanization ===
Multiple factors have contributed to increase interest in sustainable rural development in China. In response to the reform and opening up, the proportion of Chinese people who live in rural areas declined. In particular, working-age people left to find higher-paying employment in cities, while children and elderly people remained in rural areas. This, in turn, led to multiple negative impacts on rural communities, including abandoned farmland and rural hollowing. Rural hollowing is a process whereby deteriorating structures at the center of a village are gradually abandoned and new structures are constructed at the periphery of the village. Ecovillages are seen as a logical step to address these issues while promoting environmental sustainability.

=== Climate Change ===
Ecovillages can help to play a significant role in ecosystem development and restoration. Ecovillages aim to operate on the least amount of negative impact on the environment through the collective efforts of the local peoples' lifestyle choices and the physical design on the land. Not only do they aim to reduce their carbon footprint, but also work to help to restore the local environment. These villages help to restore water sources and cycles, the local soil, and the local ecosystem. Food system sustainability is also another important aspect of ecovillages. A significant portion of the food is grown from the land itself through processes such as permaculture or biodynamic farming. Energy systems are also sustainable and utilize power sources such as solar or wind energy, renewable biomass, hydroelectric power, and geothermal energy systems.

=== Government Involvement ===
In response to the issues of urbanization and climate change, the Chinese government has promoted the formation of ecovillages according to multiple official standards set forth by government agencies, including: National Eco-village Construction Standard, National Demonstration Eco-village Construction Indicators, Guide for Construction of Beautiful Countryside, and Evaluation for the Construction of Beautiful Villages (see section below).

These initiatives are in line with the broader economic goals of the Chinese government. The Chinese government is steadily moving towards incorporating more environmentally sustainable ideals within their decision and policy making. The government's climate goals, including the most recently approved 14th 5 Year Plan encompassing years 2021 to 2025, seek to focus on the combination of "sustained and healthy economic development" and "obvious improvements in quality and efficiency". The 14th 5 Year Plan also lists two new environmental goals of food and energy security. As part of these plans, the government planned to create 8000 new ecovillages. The goals of these plans include "rural development and agriculture modernization" as well as rural revitalization more broadly.

Multiple slogans related to valuing the natural environment and rural revitalization have been used as part of the justification for ecovillage development. The slogan "clear waters and green mountains are as valuable as gold and silver mountains" (Chinese: 綠水青山就是金山银山) was coined by Xi Jinping to promote ecological civilization in 2005. It has since been used as justification for the importance of ecovillage development.

== Assessment Methods ==
Multiple evaluation methods have been created and used to assess the effectiveness of ecovillage projects in China. Evaluation methods may consider ecological, social, and economic aspects.

| Assessment Name | Year | Organization/Agency |
|---|---|---|
| Guide to Assessment of Beautiful Countryside Construction | 2015 | General Administration for Quality Supervision, Inspection and Quarantine of China & Standardization Administration of China |
| National Eco-village Construction Standard (Pilot) | 2006 | Ministry of Ecology and Environment of the People's Republic of China |
| National Demonstration Eco-village Construction Indicators | 2014 | Ministry of Ecology and Environment of China |
| Evaluation for the Construction of Beautiful Villages | 2018 | Standardization Administration of China |
| BREEAM Communities Assessment | 1990 | Building Research Establishment (charitable organization) |
| Ecovillage Impact Assessment Tool | | Global Ecovillage Network |

=== BREEAM Communities Assessment ===
BREEAM (Building Research Establishment Environmental Assessment Method) community assessment is a tool for evaluating the sustainability of a neighborhood. It is meant to be used during the planning phases of development, and it was originally designed for use in the UK. A 2020 study assessed the potential of the BREEAM communities tool as a way to evaluate bottom-up Chinese ecovillages using 3 GEN-registered ecovillages.

Some experts say that one shortcoming of the BREEAM method is that its evaluation occurs only at a single time point, so it fails to capture whether a village is thriving or in decline. Additionally, a major goal of many Chinese ecovillages is to reclaim farmland and conduct sustainable agricultural practices, but the BREEAM Communities assessment does not assess farming. Also, many Chinese ecovillages renovate old buildings, whereas the BREEAM Communities assessment is more geared toward the construction of new sustainable buildings. Another problem is that as the standard of living in ecovillages improves, electricity use tends to increase, while the BREEAM Communities assessment prioritizes low electricity consumption.

=== GEN Ecovillage Assessment Tool ===
GEN's ecovillage assessment tool is based on the United Nations Sustainable Development goals, which fit into 17 categories: no poverty, zero hunger, good health and wellbeing, quality education, gender equality, clean water and sanitation, affordable and clean energy, decent work and economic growth, industry innovation and architecture, reduced inequalities, sustainable cities and communities, responsible consumption and production, climate action, life below water, life on land, peace, justice and strong institutions, and partnerships for the goals.

GEN invites people who live in the ecovillage to fill out a survey, and results are compiled on their public website as a "personal assessment." Additionally, a "collective assessment" is completed on behalf of the entire village. Under each broad goal, the survey asks whether specific activities are undertaken. In addition, participants are asked to assess their alignment with certain goals on a scale of 1–10. One example is, "We promote local and regional food security by growing our own food and seeds." These results are then used to assess the village's achievement of each of the UN Sustainable Development goals on a scale of 1–10.

The Southern Life Community ecovillage has completed this assessment.

=== Government Assessments ===
Guidelines set for ecovillages by the Chinese government, such as the Evaluation for the Construction of Beautiful Villages, are highly influential in the priorities of new ecovillage developments. Many local leaders seek to get their villages approved as ecovillages to help meet goals for the construction of new ecovillages set by the government. One criticism of ecovillage standards set by the Chinese government is that these standards focus on per capita income and neglect to evaluate the social sustainability of these developments.

==== Evaluation for Construction of Beautiful Villages (ECBV) Assessment ====
For the ECBV Assessment, the local government forms a panel that will evaluate an ecovillage once a year based on seven categories, using 101 indicators to test whether or not an ecovillage achieves the standard criteria. These seven categories include village planning, village construction, ecological environment, economic development, public service, rural civilization, primary organization, and innovation.

A limitation of the ECBV Assessment includes being unable to incorporate development trends into the assessment due to only collecting data from each year and disregarding historical data. The three pillars of sustainability are also not all equally reflected in the assessment. ECBV also provides a pass or fail result at the end of the evaluation, which does little to offer specific and detailed advice or criticism. Another limitation of the ECBV assessment is that it is rather inflexible and unable to accurately evaluate different types of ecovillages.

=== Ecovillage Assessment Controversy ===
Some researchers object to current ecovillage assessment standards put in place by the Chinese government. Instead, they advocate for assessment tools that are applicable to both bottom-up and top-down ecovillages. They support standards that evaluate ecovillages across longer periods of time, consider how indicators affect residents' satisfaction, and account for differences in local traditional culture that shape the unique goals of each community.

== Infrastructure ==
The physical and social infrastructure of an ecovillage help to regulate and keep track of the systems that are being used to sustainably support the land and its residents.

=== Water Supply ===
Rain water harvesting is a technique used by ecovillages to collect water and to prevent flooding. Collecting rain water also prevents wastage underground or oversaturation of the underground water supply. Collected water can be used for areas of land that are less humid and the water can also be saved for later use, especially during periods of drought.

Water in the Sunshine Ecovillage comes from natural mountain mineral water.

The Huatao Ecovillage installed a water-filtration system. However, this system came under criticism for being unnecessary, as the local water was already high quality. In addition, the system was expensive and wasteful, as it exceeded the needs of the ecovillage population.

=== Farming Techniques ===
Many ecovillages aim to produce their own food via sustainable farming methods. Two of GEN's criteria for evaluating ecovillages include establishing food security via farming and improving soil quality. Farming is also seen as a way of living in harmony with the land. Large swaths of farmland in China have been abandoned as the population urbanized, and some ecovillages aim to reclaim this farmland to restart food production.

The Southern Life Community ecovillage is one example of a village built on reclaimed land. Organic farming was one of the first activities prioritized when the community was established. They also have a system where bacteria biodegrade animal waste, thereby decreasing the potential for land contamination and increasing food safety.

The Sunshine ecovillage also includes reclaimed farmland and uses organic farming techniques.

=== Waste Management ===
Waste created onsite can be managed through vertical flow wetlands. Vertical flow wetlands copy natural wetlands in the way in which they filter water by removing pollutants and other impurities. Plant roots and minerals found at the root bed serve as filtration devices to treat waste that lead to clean run off.

=== Energy Systems ===
GEN advocates for the use of solar energy in ecovillages. Energy consumption in ecovillages usually encompasses energy use of households and agriculture production like food processing. Some ecovillages also use bio gas plants that enable them to process food and animal waste and turn it into biogas that can be used for everyday activities such as cooking. The use of solar plants in ecovillages also allows these ecovillages to be less dependent on power sources such as fossil fuels.

The Southern Life community ecovillage reports that 60% of its energy comes from renewable sources.

In the Sunshine Ecovillage, government subsidies on appliances have recently caused electricity consumption to rise.

=== Buildings and Architecture ===
Ecovillages may be built from scratch or use a combination of existing and new buildings.

Some ecovillages in China rely on buildings from existing traditional rural villages. One example of this is the Southern Life community, which renovated multiple buildings to serve a new purpose, such as guest housing. For this strategy, older buildings need to be refurbished to improve living conditions. Renovating old buildings is considered to be highly environmentally-friendly because there is no additional manufacturing, pouring cement, etc., which are all energy-intensive processes. Moreover, preserving traditional structures adds cultural value to the village.

Other ecovillages in China are entirely built from the ground up. An example of this is the Huatao Ecovillage. In the case of the Huatao Ecovillage, custom pre-manufactured panels were brought to the site to construct some buildings. One advantage of constructing new buildings is that they can be built to efficiently conserve water and energy. The rationale behind new construction is that any additional environmental costs of construction are offset by the sustainable characteristics of the building. Additionally, new buildings may provide communal gathering and educational spaces, which is important for the goals of many ecovillages. This approach has also encountered criticism for being more expensive and disconnected from the minimalistic ethos of ecovillages.

Another approach to ecovillage construction is to build new buildings using traditional methods. The Huangbaiyu village used this strategy and planned to construct 370 houses built from bricks made of earth and hay. The houses were planned to be south-facing, which is a common characteristic of houses in traditional Chinese villages meant to maximize heat capture during cold winter months.

The recent emphasis on rural revitalization has renewed discussion about traditional building methods. Since traditional residential buildings were developed to meet the needs of people living in a specific climate using natural, locally-found materials, they present an important source of knowledge when developing sustainable buildings in ecovillages. One example of this is the Dai folk house, the traditional dwelling style of the Dai people. These houses are raised up on stilts (known as balustrade architecture) to avoid damage from floods, which are common in the area, and are designed to minimize indoor temperature during the day. Although researching such traditional techniques could provide helpful information to those trying to revitalize rural settlements and create ecovillages, pressure for ethnic minorities to urbanize and assimilate has contributed to a loss of traditional building knowledge.

One example of sustainable building techniques based on traditional methods comes from the Sunshine Ecovillage. There, some houses are built from rammed earth, a building material made by compressing earth, gravel, lime, and other materials into firm bricks. This technique is traditional in the Yangshao and Longshan cultures. The properties of rammed earth make it well-suited to absorb and retain heat during colder months.

== Culture ==
=== Influence of Taoism ===
Taoism plays an influential role in Chinese culture, thus also affecting the way in which the country addresses ecology and climate change. Taoism (Daoism) is a philosophy and religion about self-cultivation and harmony with the cycles of nature. Taoism has often been seen as the "greenest of the schools of wisdom". In Taoism, deities are believed to inhabit nature and these living places of deities are to be respected and protected.

GEN claims that Taoism influences the ecovillage movement in China by contributing an appreciation for the natural environment. With the CCP's promotion of ecological civilization, Daoist environmental sentiments have resurged. The concept of "Xi Jinping Thought" and the plan to construct an ecological civilization is heavily influenced by the teachings of Taoism as well.

=== Cultural Preservation ===
Improving the long-term sustainability of ecovillages contributes to the preservation of ethnic minority cultures. One of the main goals of an ecovillage is to "build or regenerate diverse cultures". Another goal is to promote the sharing of rural cultural heritage.

=== Ecovillager Motivations ===
People who choose to live in bottom-up ecovillages have a variety of reasons for doing so. Many ecovillagers are young urbanites who come to the countryside seeking a simpler lifestyle. Others seek to take personal action to live a more sustainable lifestyle amidst the climate emergency.

Many ecovillages encourage residents to build deep connections with other people and forge a sense of community and interconnectedness, creating interdependence. This contrasts the push for individuality and independence in the current consumerist society of today. Ecovillages are also seen as a model for a cultural way of life that is based on a holistic worldview and one that is preferable to the modern lifestyle.

== List ==
107 top-down ecovillages in China have been certified by the government as of 2012. Other bottom-up ecovillages, including the Southern Life Community, HuaDao Ecovillage, and Sunshine Ecovillage, have not been certified by the Chinese government.

| English name | Chinese name | Location | Population |
|---|---|---|---|
| Huangbaiyu Village | 黄柏峪村 | Benxi, Liaoning, China | |
| MeiRong Village | 梅蓉村 | Hang Zhou, Zhe Jiang Province, China | 3200 |
| Qiandao Eco-Village | 千岛 | Maoliyuan Village, Jiangjia Town, Chunan County, Hangzhou City, Zhejiang Province | 20 |
| Southern Life Community | | Fuzhou, Minhou County, Fujian Province, China | 15 |
| HuaDao (Huatao) Ecological Community | 華道 | Qunan village, Longxing Town, Chongzhou, Chengdu | 15 |
| Sunshine Ecovillage | 三生谷 | Zhejiang, China | 30 |

=== Huangbaiyu (黄柏峪村) ===
Huangbaiyu Ecovillage was created as a sustainable living model located in China's Liaoning Province. The town was created by renowned architect and academic Dr. William McDonough and opened in 2002. The aim of the village is to establish a self-sufficient neighborhood that not only lessens its own environmental impact but also sets a good example for other neighborhoods to imitate.

The town was planned to employ renewable energy sources and be as energy-efficient as feasible. In order to use less energy to maintain the buildings, it also uses a variety of natural building materials, like clay and bamboo. The hamlet also uses a range of organic farming methods, including composting and polycultures, to generate food.

Since its founding, the hamlet has grown to be a well-liked tourist destination and has welcomed numerous dignitaries from around the world, including former US Vice President Al Gore. The town has also appeared in a number of documentaries, such as the Emmy-winning Big Ideas for a Small Planet series.

The community shows other communities how to live sustainably and acts as a role model for them. Other initiatives, including the Green Village, a different sustainable community situated in the same province, have drawn inspiration from it. Overall, Huangbaiyu Ecovillage is a prime example of how small-scale sustainable living can be accomplished.

Environmental Benefits of Huangbaiyu Ecovillage

Huangbaiyu Ecovillage is a notable model of sustainable living whose design allows for the reduction of environmental impact. The village was planned to be a self-sufficient neighborhood that decreases its own environmental impact and sets an example for other neighborhoods to follow.

Several energy-efficient and renewable energy sources have been incorporated into the design of the village. These include a wind turbine for extra energy, solar panels for electricity, and geothermal heat and cooling. Additionally, natural building materials that require less energy to produce and maintain than conventional building materials, like clay and bamboo, have been incorporated into the design of the village. The settlement also makes use of composting and polycultures, two organic farming practices, to generate food. These techniques lessen the energy required to grow food as well as the quantity of chemicals utilized during production.

A wastewater treatment system and a rainwater collection system are just a couple of the environmentally-friendly amenities the village has to offer. With the aid of these characteristics, the town is able to use less water and discharge less pollutants into the environment. The village is able to lessen its environmental effect and set an example for other communities by utilizing renewable energy sources, natural building materials, organic farming methods, and eco-friendly features.

Economic Impacts of Huangbaiyu Ecovillage

Huangbaiyu Ecovillage as a model of sustainable living, has benefited the neighborhood's economy. Although the village was intended to be self-sufficient and have a minimal impact on the environment, it has also benefited the local economy. By using locals for both the construction of the village and the upkeep and management of the many renewable energy sources, the community has helped to create jobs in the neighborhood. Restaurants, cafes, and gift shops, among other regional companies, now have more chances, thanks to the village.

Additionally, the village has drawn visitors from all over the world, which has benefited the local economy. Numerous foreign dignitaries have visited the village, and it has appeared in a number of documentaries, both of which have raised awareness of the place.

Furthermore, the village has served as an example for nearby sustainable communities like the Green Village. This project has brought in more money to the region and helped to add more jobs.

Local Government Support of Huangbaiyu Ecovillage

In China's Liaoning Province, the local government has given Huangbaiyu Ecovillage substantial backing. The village was intended to be self-sufficient and to have little impact on the environment, and the local government has taken action to help achieve this objective. The village's construction and the installation of renewable energy sources were both financially supported by the local government. The hamlet has grown more accessible and self-sufficient thanks to this funding.

Additionally, the village's organic farming practices and use of natural building materials have received support from the regional government. The village's rainwater collection system and sewage treatment system are both supported by the government. The village's efforts to draw tourists have also received help from the regional authorities. Numerous foreign dignitaries have visited the village, and it has appeared in a number of documentaries, both of which have raised awareness of the place.

Community Engagement and Education

The local community has been successfully involved and given educational opportunities through Huangbaiyu Ecovillage. The village has given the neighborhood's residents educational opportunities while also being self-sufficient and having a lower environmental effect. Numerous workshops and seminars on alternative energy sources, organic farming methods, and natural building materials have been held in the village. The local community has had the chance to learn more about sustainable living and how to lessen their personal environmental effect, thanks to these sessions.

The hamlet has also played host to a number of neighborhood gatherings, including concerts and festivals, which have helped bind the neighborhood together. These gatherings have promoted a sense of community and given the neighborhood's residents a chance to learn more about sustainable living.

The community has also participated in a number of educational programs, such as the Green Village Project, which offers educational opportunities to nearby institutions and schools. Through this project, the local community has had the chance to learn more about sustainable living and how they can lessen their own environmental impact.

Challenges Faced by Huangbaiyu Ecovillage

Since its inception, Huangbaiyu Ecovillage has encountered numerous difficulties. The village has faced a variety of challenges despite being built to be self-sufficient and have a minimal impact on the environment. The absence of finance has been one of the village's main problems. The construction of the hamlet and the installation of renewable energy sources were paid for by donations from the local government and private benefactors. The village has found it challenging to become self-sufficient as a result.

The town has also struggled with issues related to public perception. Many individuals are dubious of the village's attempts to lessen its environmental impact since they are unfamiliar with the idea of sustainable living.^{[5}] In spite of these difficulties, the village has been successful in its initiatives to build a self-sufficient neighborhood and lessen its environmental impact.

The Future of Huangbaiyu Ecovillage

The Huangbaiyu Ecovillage has a promising future. The village has acted as an example of how sustainable living can be accomplished and has encouraged other communities to embrace similar sustainable methods. The village may continue to lead by example in sustainable living for other communities with the ongoing assistance of the local government.

=== Sunshine Ecovillage ===
The Sunshine Ecovillage was founded in collaboration between the local government and a private company. However, it is still considered to be a bottom-up village. It has successfully hosted multiple conferences about ecovillages.

=== Huatao (Huadao) Ecovillage ===
Huatao Ecovillage was the first ecovillage in China to join the GEN and was first opened for residents to move into in 2016. This ecovillage was also newly constructed (as opposed to being repurposed from a traditional village). Its buildings meet the Taiwanese Ecology, Energy Saving, Waste Reduction, and Health standard (EEWH). Its emphasis on communal spaces, including a central courtyard, is influenced by traditional local architectural values. Multiple international conferences about ecovillages have taken place here. In 2018, many of the housing units were vacant, leading to some inefficiencies and services being shut down. This ecovillage has come under criticism for its use of high-tech building materials and expensive design, which are thought to run counter to the ecovillage mindset of simplistic living.

=== Southern Life Community ===
Southern Life Community is a self-sufficient ecovillage that was founded by the Zhengro Foundation and Another Land in 2015 and it is located on abandoned farmland. It includes multiple traditional buildings that have since been renovated. The fundamental philosophy of the Southern Life Community is "open sharing" or welcoming "life from all over the world" and the rejection of the current Chinese consumer economy where sustainable development is rare. This ecovillage emphasizes its organic food farm and education program, which teaches people to reclaim farmland. They also have an organic food barn with a system of bacteria that degrade animal waste.

=== House of I Heritage Chateau ===
The House of I is not an ecovillage but rather, an ecovillage education site associated with GEN and the Holistic Centers Network. It is located within a development north of Beijing near the Yanqing Mountains called Heritage Chateau. Their goal is to educate people to live in greater harmony with nature. They regularly host cultural events. Healing through music is a component of HOI, and they sell CDs of original music. An organic vineyard is part of the project, as well. In October 2019, the HOI hosted the GEN Ambassador Training Conference, which drew approximately 40 attendees.

=== The Second Home ===
The Second Home is the largest ecovillage in China and has become one of the models of ecological community living in China. This ecovillage was created in 2009 in Yunnan, China, by Xue Feng. The Second Home ecovillages emphasize harmony between human beings and nature and is a commune where all resources are shared and responsibilities such as caring for the sick and elderly, living, shelter, and transportation are communal responsibilities. The theoretical system followed by residents of Second Home is called the "New Universal Values" and is still in the process of being updated.

== Outreach ==
=== Ecotourism ===
Many ecovillages allow educational ecotours that bring tourists in and provide them with an immersive experience of what happens inside an ecovillage. These tourists are usually housed in the ecovillage themselves and volunteers bring them around the land and teach them about the importance of environmental conservation. Traveling to rural areas to stay with a local family is a common form of ecotourism in China, known as 农家乐 (traditional characters: 農家樂) in Chinese.

Tourists also are able to participate in hands-on activities related to everyday life at the ecovillage. These activities may include organic farming practices, milking cows, and making Compressed Stabilized Earth Blocks (CSEB).

The Southern Life is an example of an ecovillage that hosts guests, and they renovated a traditional building to create a place for them to stay.

=== Eco Conferences ===
Conferences pertaining to environmental conservation and ecovillages are hosted every year where conservation groups, college organizations, experts, and government officials are invited to speak about the topic of current pressing environmental issues.

Multiple ecovillages host conferences about the ecovillage lifestyle to encourage the development of similar villages elsewhere. In 2015, the Sunshine Ecovillage Network hosted a conference in collaboration with GEN. There were approximately 500 attendees. In October 2016, the Sunshine Ecovillage Network hosted the second annual international ecovillage forum. There were over 400 attendees, including ecovillage experts from GEN, leaders of traditional villages seeking to transition into becoming an ecovillage, as well as government officials.

=== Programs and Workshops ===
Ecovillages also host workshops and programs geared towards educating the general public about the environment, conservation techniques, and the overall mission of each specific ecovillage. One example of this would be rural development programs, where local farmers are invited to learn about the ways in which they can start using poly cultured farming systems or integrated farming systems that include horticulture, floriculture, and agriculture practices. Farmers are given advice on what to plant on their farms in order to maximize sources of income. These practices would not only help preserve and increase the amount of biodiversity in the land, but also help to make sure that farmers are able to generate an income throughout the year.

Many also host programs located within the village that relate to health and wellness. Self-help groups and training groups are usually formed within ecovillages that teach members about skills such as health, hygiene, bank account management, equipment, etc. Members are also encouraged to eat the fresh produce grown at the ecovillage.

== Controversies and Limitations ==
There have also been many skeptics about the effectiveness of ecovillages. According to one educator who stayed in an ecovillage, Leslie Bardon, the problems of ecovillages can be summarized in three main bullet points:

1. Ecovillages are actually very financially dependent on the outside world despite the marketing of these lands as being self-sufficient. The dependence on the outside world causes concern because it makes it difficult for them to challenge modern models of eco living.
2. The people who live in ecovillages live there voluntarily, which attracts a certain type of individual. The lack of variety among its residents may influence the way in which these ecovillages are perceived and run.
3. Each ecovillage is so small and also so different from one another that even though they are sites for experimentation of environmental conservation techniques, the results from these experiments cannot usually be applied to larger metropolitan cities.

Ecovillages also face another set of obstacles when it comes to carbon neutrality. The level of technological development, the lack of funds, and the cultural practices of the residents who reside in these communities play a large role in hindering this.

== Influence on Environmental Problems ==
Many experts have argued that ecovillages are not an effective enough way to lead to overall environmental betterment in China even though the country has set aside a large amount of farmland to be turned into these ecovillages. As a result, many local farmers and people who live in rural villages in the countryside are being forced out of their lands and into the city. Ecovillages have been described as being "too remote, too small, too class-exclusive, and expensive." They are also more susceptible to marketing, economic, and political influence. Regardless how ecovillages are marketed, they are still very dependent on the outside world. Ecovillages that are also too remote and self-contained may have little influence on how to improve the environment of land outside of its borders.

However, ecovillages can also bring many advantages and possibilities for ecological progress. These cities can become a "laboratory of clean technology." Ecovillages or eco-cities can serve as optimal places to test out new technologies and designs related to clean living before being introduced to the urban environment where the majority of the population live. Environmental systems such as new methods of public transportation, sewage systems, urban agriculture, renewable energy capture and storage, traffic regulation, and drinking water desalination or recycling can be first tested in these eco-cities before implementation in larger urban cities.
