= Oxpark =

Oxpark Páirc an Daimh
- townland
- Location within Ireland
- Coordinates: 52.89°N 8.03°W
- Country: Ireland
- County: Tipperary

Oxpark (Irish: Páirc an Daimh) is a townland in the Barony of Ormond Lower, County Tipperary, Ireland. It is located north of Main Street Cloughjordan.

== Historical structures ==
Cloughjordan House is an historic private residence within Oxpark. The present house comprises a central two storey five bay section flanked by two gable fronted sections. The grounds contain the remains of a moat and farm buildings from the 19th and 20th centuries. A business consisting of a cookery school, wedding venue, event destination and B & B accommodation operates from here. Historical records of the walled nursery garden have been transferred to the archives of the National Botanic Gardens (Ireland).

A sweathouse and fulacht fiadh were identified during excavations in 2006 prior to work commencing on development of the eco-village.

All that remains of Cloughjordan Fever hospital are a few stones accessed from the west side of the eco-village.

== Recent developments ==
An eco-village known as The Village is being constructed in Oxpark. on 67 acres (270,000 m^{2}) of land, it merges with the existing village of Cloughjordan. A community amphitheatre, created within the eco-village was opened by Michael D. Higgins, President of Ireland in April 2017.
