= Sole inheritance =

Sole inheritance or unitary inheritance is the passing of an estate from a person to a single heir upon death. It contrasts with partible inheritance. Forms of sole inheritance include:

- Primogeniture, sole inheritance by the first son
- Ultimogeniture, sole inheritance by the last son
- Agnatic seniority
