= Miccosukee (disambiguation) =

The Miccosukee are a Native American tribe of Florida.

Miccosukee can also refer to:

- Miccosukee, Florida, a small, now unincorporated, village in Leon County, Florida
- Lake Miccosukee in Jefferson County, Florida
- Mikasuki language
- Miccosukee Land Co-op, an intentional community in North Florida
- Miccosukee Resort & Gaming, a casino in Florida
