= Cloughjordan =

Town in County Tipperary, Ireland

Cloughjordan Cloch Shiurdáin
- Town
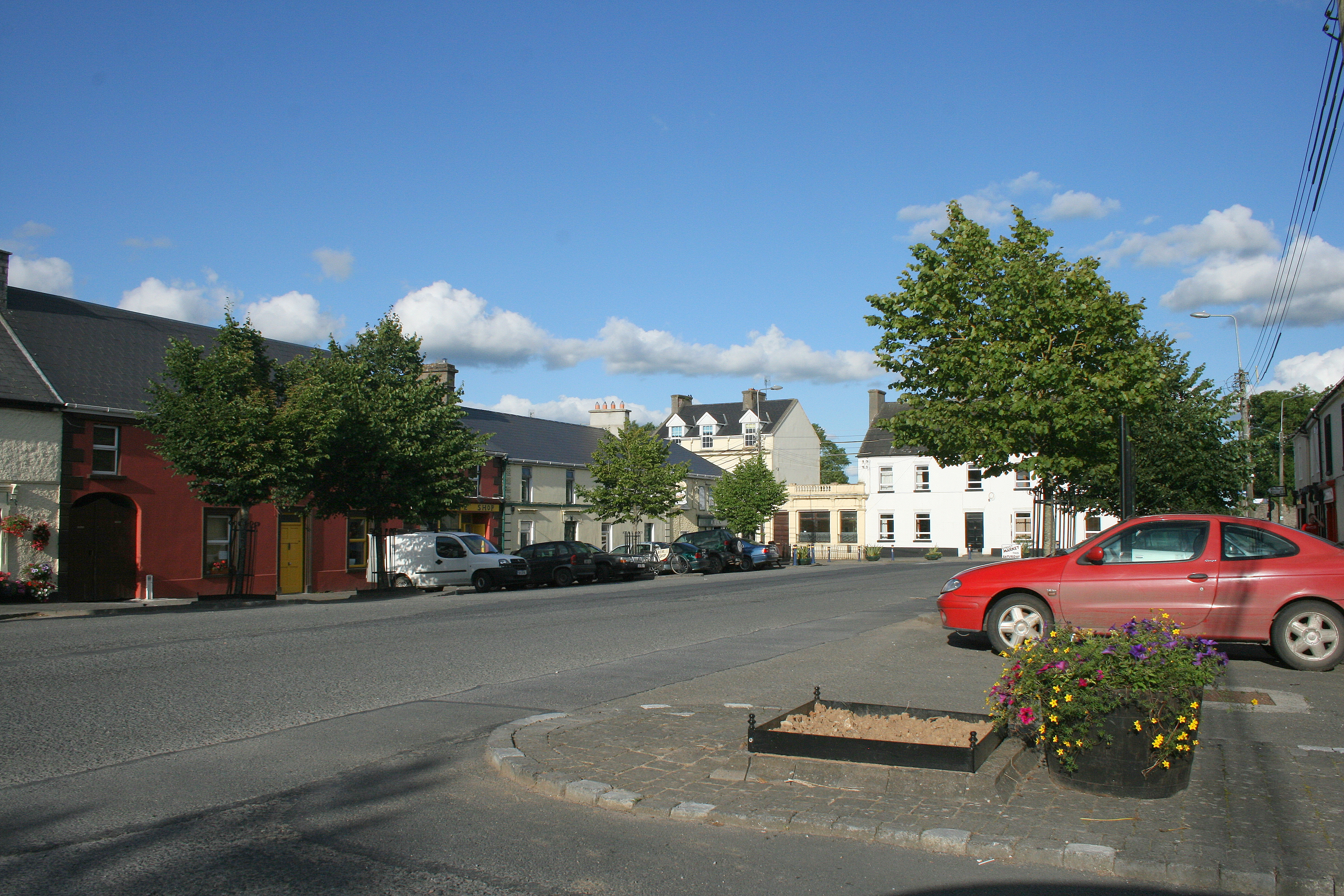
- Cloughjordan town centre

- Location in Ireland
- Coordinates: 52°56′25″N 8°02′08″W
- Country: Ireland
- Province: Munster
- County: County Tipperary
- Elevation: 380 m (1,250 ft)

Population (2022)
  - Total: 701
- Time zone: UTC+0 (WET)
  - Summer (DST): UTC-1 (IST (WEST))
- Irish Grid Reference: R9761087713

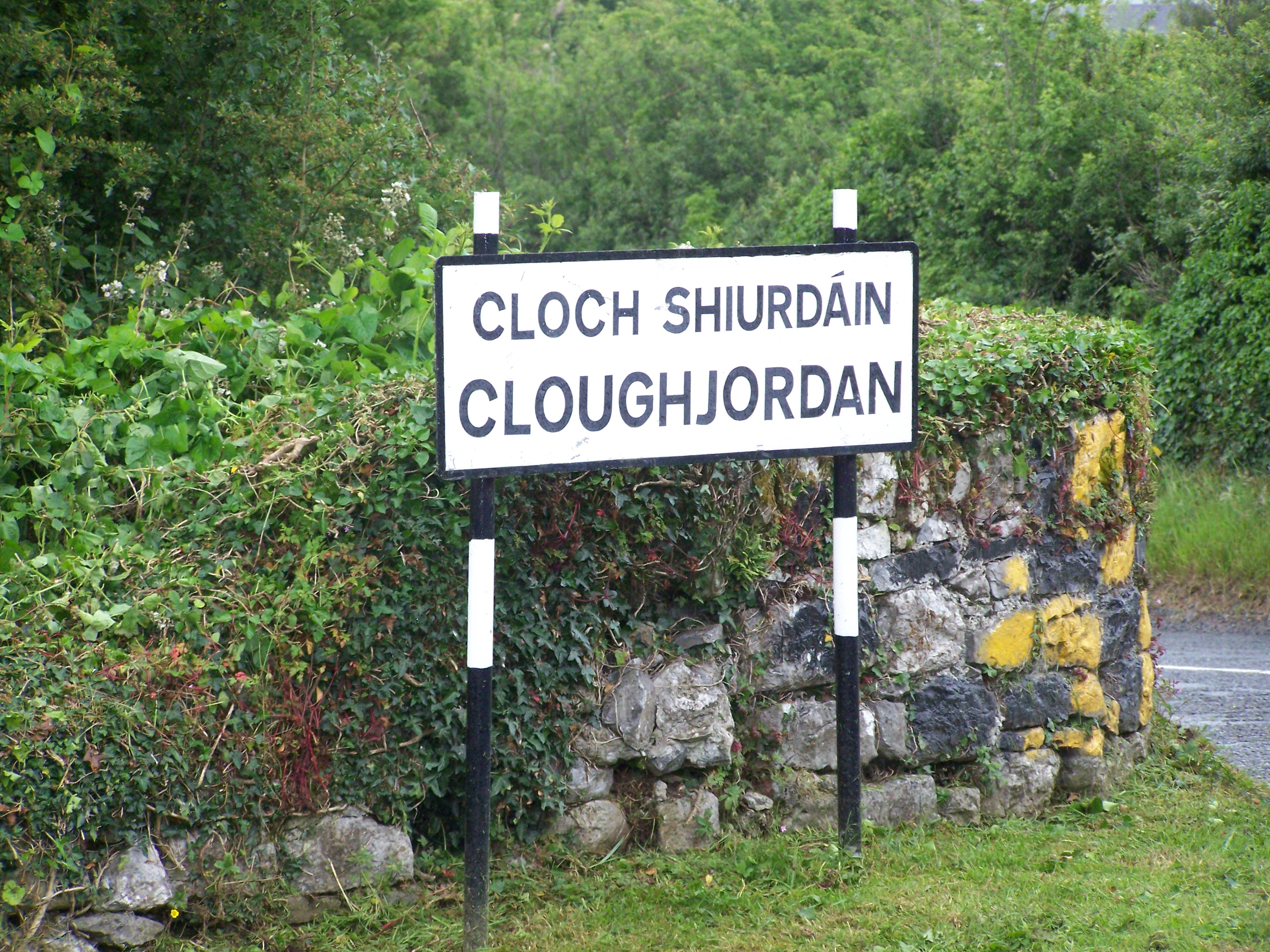
Road signage in the village

Cloughjordan, officially Cloghjordan (/klɒxˈdʒɔːrdən/ klokh-JOR-dən, Irish: Cloch Shiurdáin, meaning 'Siurdán's stone or castle'), is a town in County Tipperary in Ireland. It is in the barony of Ormond Lower, and it is also a parish in the Roman Catholic Diocese of Killaloe.

The town is situated in the north-western part of Tipperary close to the border with County Offaly. It is almost equidistant from Nenagh, Roscrea and Birr and is close to Ireland's largest river, the Shannon, and Lough Derg.

Poet and Easter Rising leader Thomas MacDonagh, a native of Cloughjordan, described it as a place "in calm of middle country".

Cloghjordan is in the Dáil constituency of Tipperary. From 2016 to 2020 it was in the Offaly constituency. As of the 2022 census, Cloghjordan had a population of 701 people.

== History ==
Developed at the intersection of travel routes between Nenagh, Birr, Borrisokane, Shinrone and Moneygall, the village of Cloughjordan began as an inhabited settlement during the Norman lordship of Ireland of the 13th and 14th centuries when the De Marisco family were allotted land in Ormond under the overlordship of the Butlers by King Henry II. One unit of the De Mariscos (Morris or Morrissey in modern terms) moved into this area, took over the territory and built a stone castle and manor house guarded by a moat surrounding the dwelling.

There is a story which relates that the first De Marisco, who resided here, was a Norman knight who had travelled to the Holy Land to take part in a Crusade against the Saracens. He is said to have brought back a stone from the River Jordan which he built in over the doorway of this castle and it was from that stone that the village got its name – the Stone of Jordan – Clogh Shiúrdáin – Cloughjordan.

Cloughjordan was further developed in the late 17th century by Cromwellian grantees when Colonel John Harrison, an officer in Cromwell's army, was granted an estate of 1,484 acres (6.01 km^{2}) of land around Cloughjordan in payment for his military services. Harrison built a house, now known as Cloughjordan House, at the site of the original Norman Castle of De Marisco and incorporated the old castle into the new building, in which one wall of the castle, about seven and a half feet thick (2.2 m), is still in existence to this day.

Cloughjordan was then remodelled in the late 18th century to include a square in front of the Church of Ireland on the east–west main street.

In 1909, Cloughjordan was one of the first villages in Ireland, after Carlow and Birr, to provide its own rural electrification scheme. The Electricity Supply Board (ESB) took over the supplying of electricity to the town in 1948.

== Connection with Jordan ==
In October 2019, several hundred people gathered in Cloughjordan, to celebrate the revealing of a piece of public art to mark the 800-year old connection between the Hashemite Kingdom of Jordan and the village of Cloughjordan. The piece of art known as "The Friendship Stone" was sourced by the Government of the Kingdom of Jordan and presented to the people of Cloughjordan by the Jordanian Irish Association.

A group of residents from Cloughjordan then travelled to Jordan to experience the local culture and visit several historical sites. The group was entertained at the Irish Embassy in Amman.

== Transport ==
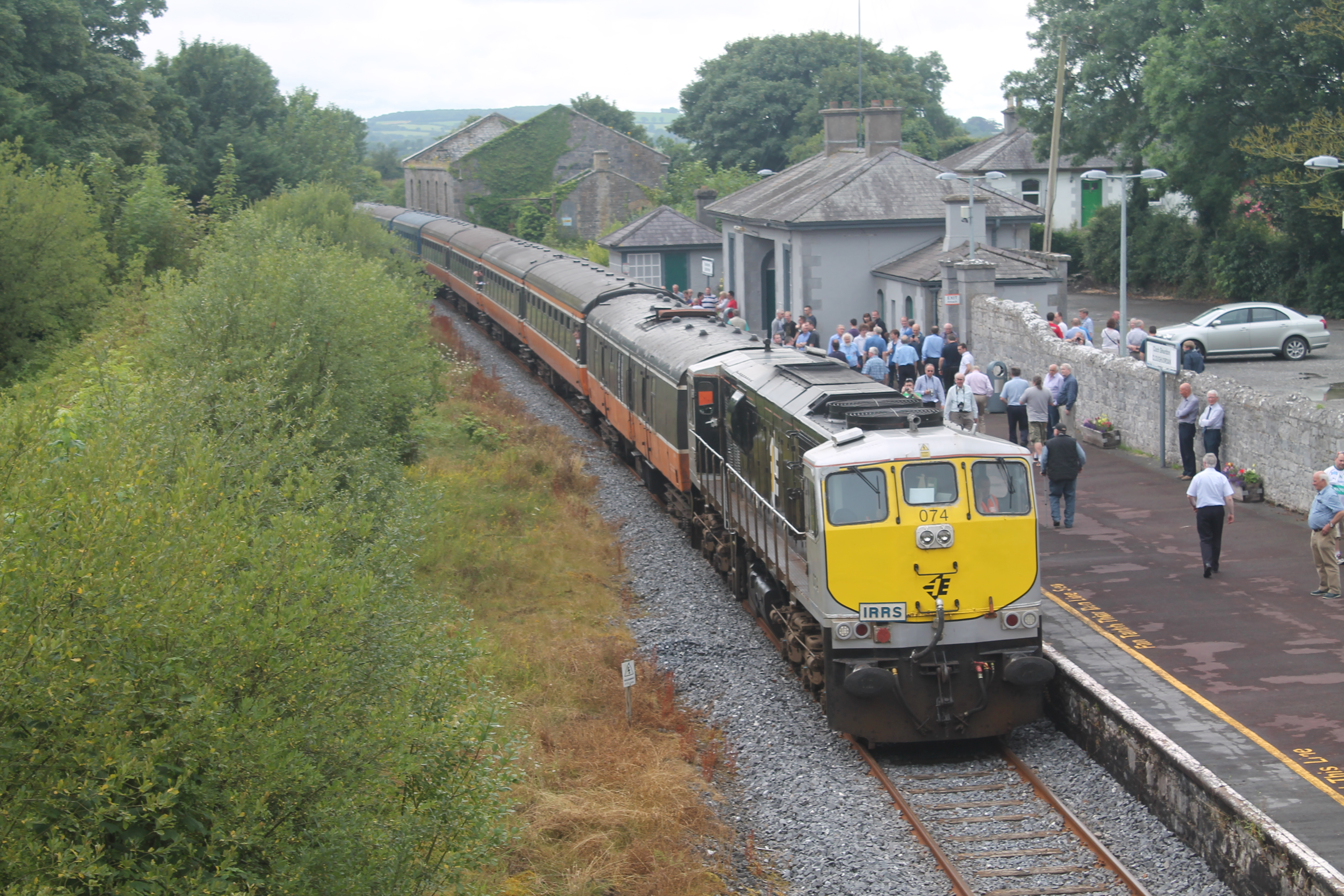
Cloughjordan railway station

Cloughjordan railway station opened on 5 October 1863. It is on the Limerick–Ballybrophy railway line, at Ballybrophy it joins the main Dublin–Cork railway line, rail services are provided by Iarnród Éireann.

A January 2012 national newspaper article suggested that Iarnród Éireann was expected to seek permission from the National Transport Authority to close the line however an enhanced timetable was in force on a trial basis during 2012. The service was again reduced from February 2013.

Ken Daly Bus Hire operates limited minibus services between Cloughjordan and Birr, Nenagh and Roscrea. Each return service operates once every week.

Local Link Tipperary operates bus service No. 854 between Roscrea railway station and Nenagh which stops at Templemore Road, Cloughjordan. The service operates seven days a week and also links Cloughjordan to neighbouring communities of Shinrone, Moneygall and Toomevara.

== Education ==
Cloughjordan's first national school opened in 1876. Its first teachers were Joseph and Mary Louise MacDonagh, parents of Thomas MacDonagh, succeeded by Denis Costello, father of Michael Joe Costello. Nowadays, Cloughjordan children have crèche and primary schooling but there is no secondary school in the town.

A childcare centre opened in 2010 offering crèche and preschool facilities in the former Macra na Feirme hall on Lower Main Street. Kilruane has a Montessori pre-school. There are two primary schools in Cloughjordan: Number One School is located on Templemore Road, east of the town centre and Number Two School is located on Lower Main Street, west of the town centre.

There is no secondary education provision in the town: local students travel to schools in neighbouring Nenagh, Borrisokane and Birr or further afield.

== Religion ==
Cloghjordan has three Christian churches: one Roman Catholic (SS Michael and John's, built in 1898), Church of Ireland (St Kieran's, 1837) and Methodist (1875).

== Ecovillage ==
The Cloughjordan Ecovillage has a working group known as the Village Education Research and Training (VERT), which runs courses in the eco-village in encouraged best practice in sustainable living. The Ecovillage is a project which aims to create a community with commitments to ecological, social and economic sustainability. This community, developed on 67 acres (270,000 m^{2}) of farmland, merges with the existing village of Cloughjordan through a street opposite the Church of Ireland church. The first residents moved into the eco-village in December 2009. Also based in the eco-village is "Cultivate", an organisation focused on sustainable living and learning.

Other local projects include Cloughjordan Community Farm, which was established in 2008 with members drawn from the surrounding area. The farm aims to supply member's families with much of their food using organic and biodynamic principles.

== Sport and leisure ==
Kilruane MacDonagh's GAA is the local Gaelic Athletic Association club. Cloughjordan also has a soccer club that competes in the North Tipperary & District League.

Cloughjordan is on the route of the Ormond Way part of the Beara-Breifne Way, a long-distance walking and cycling trail between the Beara Peninsula in County Cork and Blacklion in County Cavan.

A free 5 km Parkrun takes place in Knockanacree Woods each Saturday. The woods are managed by Coillte which supports a local community initiative to improve walking paths and recreation facilities.

Ormond Foxhounds are based at kennels in nearby Modreeny.

== Buildings of note ==
There are several buildings of architectural interest in and around Cloughjordan.

- Cloughjordan House, Step Road. Oxpark (c. 1675) 17th-century house built on to existing tower house, further extended in the 18th century. A business consisting of a cookery school, wedding venue, event destination and B & B accommodation operates from here.
- Mullenkeagh House, Borrisokane Rd. Detached two-storey house, renovated early 19th century in Georgian style but still contains many of its original features. (originally c. 1700, remodelled c. 1800)
- Bridge at Modreeny, Modreeny Estate (c. 1790) Cast iron parapets between cut limestone piers surmounted at one end by eagles, at the other by urns.
- Houses, formerly The Barracks (also known as the Militia Houses), The Square (c. 1800) Built as a three-storey barracks and later converted to housing. Original outbuildings to rear. The Meadow (or Square) was planned as an adjoining parade ground.
- Distillery Cottage, Borrisokane Rd. Mullenkeagh. Single storey cottage built for the manager of the adjacent though now ruined, distillery. (c. 1820)
- St Kieran's Church of Ireland church, The Square (1837) Designed by James and George Richard Pain for the Board of First Fruits. A cut stone spire surmounts the centrally placed entrance on to the Meadow (or Square).
- Cloughjordan railway station, Townfields Townland (1863) Cluster of structures, the classically influenced station building, station masters house and road bridge over the tracks.
- Cloughjordan Methodist Church, Main St. (1875) Modest church building with polychromic tiling.
- SS Michael and John's Roman Catholic Church, Moneygall Rd. (c. 1898) See stained glass windows from the studio of Harry Clarke, behind the altar, and Evie Hone, to the side of the altar. This replaced the now ruined church in the nearby townland of Coolnamunna.
- Various homes in the eco-village, examples of modern residential architecture. (2009–2014) Twenty nine of the eco-village homes were open to the public as part of the Near zero-energy buildings open doors Ireland event held in November 2013. Other NZEB Open Doors events took place elsewhere in Europe under a program promoted by the European Union.

== Festivals and culture ==
Cloughjordan Festival is an annual celebration of art, sport, music and food held each summer in various venues around the village.

Cloughtoberfest, a celebration of both gypsy jazz and Irish craft brewing took place each October from 2011 to 2015.

The Thomas MacDonagh museum and heritage centre was opened in May 2013. Located in the former home of the MacDonagh family, the centre also houses the town library and an exhibition space. A Thomas MacDonagh Week-end was first held in May 2014, a celebration of Cloughjordan's connection with MacDonagh is now an annual event.

A cineclub was officially launched on 25 August 2005 – some forty-four years since a film had last been screened in Cloughjordan.

The community amphitheatre, was opened by Michael D. Higgins, President of Ireland in April 2017.

In 2012, 2013 and 2014 Cloughjordan won the National Green Community Award.

== People ==
- Patrick Bergin, actor, resides in Cloughjordan.
- Dinny Cahill, former hurling player and manager born 1954 in Cloughjordan
- Michael Joseph Costello, Army General, born 1904 in Cloughjordan.
- Len Gaynor, former hurling player and manager born 1944 in Cloughjordan.
- John MacDonagh, film director and playwright, brother of Joseph and Thomas MacDonagh (see below).
- Joseph MacDonagh, Sinn Féin politician, brother of John (see above) and Thomas (see below). Died whilst on hunger strike in 1922.
- Thomas MacDonagh, poet and Easter Rising leader, born in Cloughjordan, was one of the signatories of the 1916 Proclamation of the Republic. The local heritage centre and Gaelic Athletic Association park bear his name and a statue of him stands at the top of Main Street.
- Tom Moloughney, former hurler, born 1940 in Cloughjordan.
- Eamon O'Shea, former hurler and coach, born 1958 in Cloughjordan.
- Charlie Swan, multiple National Hunt champion jockey.
- John Talbot, Canadian Reformer and schoolmaster, born 1797 in Cloughjordan.

== See also ==
- List of towns and villages in Ireland
