= Mullenkeagh =

Townland in County Tipperary, Ireland

Mullenkeagh (Irish: An Muileann Caoch) is a townland in the Barony of Ormond Lower in County Tipperary, Ireland. It is located at the west end of Cloughjordan Main Street in the civil parish of Modreeny. The alternative spelling of Mulinkeagh is recognised.

== Buildings of note ==
Distillery Cottage (c1820), a single storey cottage built for the manager of the adjacent though now ruined distillery is listed as being of architectural and social interest.

Mullenkeagh House (c1700), a two-storey house with alterations (c1800). Listed as of architectural interest.
