= Coolnamunna =

Townland in County Tipperary, Ireland

- Townland
- Location in Ireland
- Coordinates: 52°56′25″N 8°02′08″W
- Country: Ireland
- Province: Munster
- County: County Tipperary
- Elevation: 380 m (1,250 ft)
- Time zone: UTC+0 (WET)
  - Summer (DST): UTC-1 (IST (WEST))
- Irish Grid Reference: R9761087713

Coolnamunna is a townland in the historical barony of Ormond Upper, County Tipperary, Ireland.

== Location ==
Coolnamunna townland is located to the west of Cloughjordan, south of the R490 road to Borrisokane.

== Structures of note ==
The ruins of Garraun church are listed as being of architectural, historical and social interest as this was the first Catholic Church built in the Cloughjordan area. The land that the church was built on was provided by the Kennedy family of the nearby Coolmanunna House. The church fell in to disrepair once the church of Saints Michael and John was constructed on the Templemore Road in Cloughjordan around 1898.

Coolmanunna House, a detached five-bay home with two-stories over a basement was built by the Kennedy family about 1820. The distinctive gate posts feature wrought-iron railings with cut stone piers. The house is listed as being of architectural and historical interest. There is also a ruined gate lodge at the roadside.
