= Diane Gilman (environmentalist) =

American painter, potter and writer (1945–1998)

Diane Gilman (1945 – 1998) was an American painter, potter, writer and co-founder of the Context Institute. She played a key role in the initial development and coordination of the Global Ecovillage Network, a support network for model communities to show how to live more sustainably on the planet, in urban, rural, developed and less developed situations. In 1991, she and her husband, Robert Gilman co-wrote Eco-Villages and Sustainable Communities, a seminal study of ecovillages for Gaia Trust.

== Biography ==
Born 1945, Gilman attended the University of California at Santa Barbara, graduating with a Bachelor of Arts in Art. A professional watercolor painter and potter, she founded the Context Institute with her husband, Robert in 1979. She was Associate Publisher of In Context magazine from 1983–1995 and coordinated citizen diplomacy work with the USSR for the Institute. She and Robert Gilman co-founded the Foundation for Russian/American Economic Cooperation, in Seattle, Washington.

Gilman directed the Context Institute's Sustainable Community Program and coauthored a 1991 report on Ecovillages and Sustainable Communities around the world. The report included guidelines for the development of sustainable communities, along with case studies. Gilman co-facilitated a major Sustainable Community and Ecovillage Conference held at Findhorn, Scotland, in October 1995. This conference was instrumental in giving shape to the ecovillage movement.

She was on the advisory board of the Ecovillage Training Center in Summertown, Tennessee as well as other organizations working to provide positive solutions for living in our times.

Diane Gilman died of cancer in 1998.
