= Cloughjordan Ecovillage =

Eco-village in County Tipperary, Ireland

- Eco-village
- Location within Ireland
- Coordinates: 52.946°N 8.038°W
- Country: Ireland
- County: Tipperary

Area
  - Eco-village: 0.28 km^{2} (0.11 sq mi)
  - Urban: 0.15 km^{2} (0.058 sq mi)
  - Rural: 0.13 km^{2} (0.050 sq mi)

Dimensions
  - Length: 0.9 km (0.56 mi)
  - Width: 0.4 km (0.25 mi)
- Elevation: 90 m (300 ft)

Population (November 2020)
  - Eco-village: 130
  - Density: 460/km^{2} (1,200/sq mi)
- Website: thevillage.ie

The Cloughjordan Ecovillage is an ongoing project to create an eco-village community in the village of Cloughjordan in County Tipperary, Ireland. The community is being developed on 67 acres (270,000 m^{2}) of farmland, purchased in 2005, within the townland of Oxpark and which merges with the existing village of Cloughjordan. The first residents moved into their homes in the eco-village in December 2009.

A district heating system powered by a wood chip boiler provides hot water to the homes.

A community-supported agriculture scheme was established in 2008. Members of Cloughjordan community farm are drawn from the eco-village and surrounding area. The farm aims to supply members' families with much of their food using biodynamic principles. The farm cultivates 12 acres within the eco-village.

Village Education Research and Training (VERT) is a working group within the eco-village. It runs courses encouraging best practice in sustainable living.

29 near zero-energy buildings (NZEBs) in the village were open to the public during the "Near Zero Energy Buildings Open Doors Ireland" event held in November 2013. Other NZEB Open Doors events took place elsewhere in Europe, under a program promoted by the European Union.

A community amphitheatre, created within the eco-village was opened by Michael D. Higgins, President of Ireland in April 2017.
