= Global Ecovillage Network =

Global association

The Global Ecovillage Network (GEN) is a global association of people and communities (ecovillages) dedicated to living "sustainable plus" lives by restoring the land and adding more to the environment than is taken. Network members share ideas and information, transfer technologies and develop cultural and educational exchanges.

== History ==
Hildur and Ross Jackson from Denmark established the Gaia Trust, a charitable foundation, in 1991. Gaia funded a study by Robert Gilman and Diane Gilman of sustainable communities around the world. The report, Ecovillages and Sustainable Communities, was released in 1991. The report found that although there were many interesting ecovillage projects, the full-scale ideal ecovillage did not yet exist. Collectively, however, the various projects described a vision of a different culture and lifestyle that could be further developed.

In 1991 the Gaia Trust convened a meeting in Denmark of representatives of eco-communities to discuss strategies for further developing the ecovillage concept. That led to the formation of the Global Ecovillage Network. In 1994 the Ecovillage Information Service was launched. In 1995, the first international conference of ecovillage members, entitled Ecovillages and Sustainable Communities for the 21st Century was held at Findhorn, Scotland. The movement grew rapidly following this conference.

By 2001, GEN had obtained consultative status at the United Nations Economic and Social Council (ECOSOC). In October 2005, at the conference to celebrate the tenth anniversary of GEN, a group of young adults joined to found NextGEN (the Next Generation of the Global Ecovillage Network). GEN does not have a verification procedure to select ecovillages or member subscriptions on its website. A Community Sustainability Assessment Tool has been developed that provides a means to assess how successful a particular ecovillage is at improving its sustainability.

== Members ==
The network includes a variety of types of sustainable settlements and ecovillages:

- Eco towns, such as Auroville in South India and the Federation of Damanhur in Italy;
- rural ecovillages, such as Gaia Asociación in Argentina and Huehuecoyotl, in Mexico;
- permaculture sites, including Crystal Waters, Queensland, Australia, Cochabamba, Bolivia and Barus, Brazil;
- urban rejuvenation projects, such as Los Angeles EcoVillage and Christiania in Copenhagen, and
- educational centers, such as Findhorn Foundation in Scotland, the Centre for Alternative Technology in Wales, and the Ecovillage Training Center in Tennessee.

== Aim ==
The Global Ecovillage Network's aim is "to support and encourage the evolution of sustainable settlements across the world." The network does this through:

- Internal and external communications services; facilitating the flow and exchange of information about ecovillages and demonstration sites;
- Networking and project coordination in fields related to sustainable settlements, and
- Global cooperation/partnerships (UN Best Practices, EU Phare, EYFA, ECOSOC).

== Regions ==
GEN is composed of five global regions: Africa (GEN Africa), Europe (GEN Europe), Latin America (CASA), North America (GENNA) and Oceania & Asia (GENOA).
