= Cloughjordan House =

Private residence in County Tipperary, Ireland

Cloughjordan House is a private residence in Cloughjordan, County Tipperary, Ireland. Built on the site of a tower house that was extended in the 17th and 18th centuries. The present house comprises a central two storey five bay section flanked by two gable fronted sections.

== Grounds ==
The grounds contain the remains of a moat and extensive farm buildings from the 19th and 20th centuries. Records from the walled nursery garden have been transferred to the archives of the National Botanic Gardens.

== Later use ==
Still privately owned and occupied, the house is occasionally open to the public by prior arrangement has been used as a cookery school, wedding venue, event destination and for B & B accommodation. Concerts were held here during the 2015 "Cloughtoberfest" gypsy jazz and craft brewing festival.

== Protection and listing ==
The property is listed on North Tipperary County Council’s record of protected structures (ref S456 & S458). The National Inventory of Architectural Heritage categorises the house as being of special interest in the architectural, artistic, archaeological, historical and social categories.
