= Dai bamboo house =

Common architectural style in Dai villages

A Dai bamboo house is a type of stilt building primarily constructed of bamboo as the traditional form of housing for Dai people. The lower floor was about seven or eight feet high. Horses and oxen were hitched to the posts. There was a terrace near the upper stairs, which turned into a large long room. The rest of the house was a largely open space with a low roof, sloping on both sides, with eaves to the floor and, generally, no windows. If the eaves were slightly higher, there were small windows on both sides and a door on the back. In the middle of the building was a fireplace, burning day and night. The roof was covered with thatch and the doors and windows are made of bamboo. The construction is easy. It only took a few days to cut down bamboo and gather neighbors together to build it. These houses are perishable and had to be repaired each year after the rainy season. This construction method was conducive to damp roof, and drainage of rain suitable for topography of the PingBa area.

Most Dai live in the Pingba region. Abundant rainfall with an annual average temperature of 21 °C makes a very suitable environment for building bamboo structures. Bamboo buildings are easy to set up, and are breathable and cool to avoid miasma, dampness and flooding, while resisting earthquakes and preventing insects and snakes from entering.

== Description ==
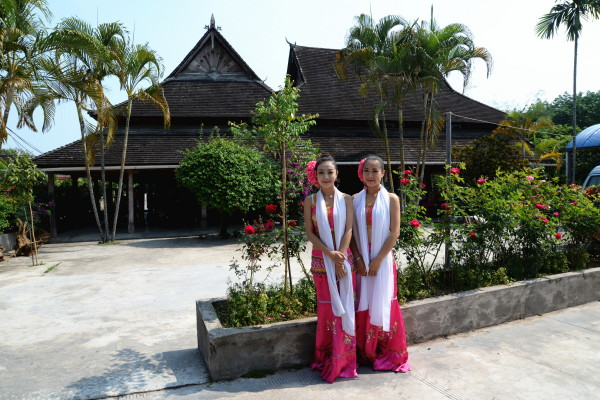

The floor of the bamboo building is square, and above the ground floor. The main floor forms the ceiling of the ground floor without walls, which is used for raising livestock and piling up debris. The main floor has a bedroom and a main room with a fire pond with a place to cook tea. The main room is used for family reunions, while outside, there is an open front porch and a balcony. The bright and airy front porch is the place where the host works, eats, rests and receives guests during the day. The sunny porch includes a water jar to wash one's hands and face, and is a convenient location for drying clothes and crops. This corridor is an indispensable part of the bamboo building. Annual rainfall often causes flooding, but the open ground floor and many gaps of bamboo sticks surrounding the main floor are very conducive to the passage of flood water.

Dai people believe in Buddhism and have many superstitious taboos. Almost every village has a Buddhist temple. It is traditionally stipulated that houses shall be built on the opposite and side of the Buddhist temple, and the floor of the houses shall be no higher than the platform on which the Buddha sits in the Buddhist temple. Stone and tile may be discouraged in housing construction, and there is a length limit on the wooden support pillars. Carved decorations and six lattice doors are forbidden. Homes cannot have a third enclosed room on the main floor, and stairs must be built as a single length without intervening platforms. This uniformity is intended to prevent housing size, quality or elevation from reflecting economic disparity among the people in the village. These restrictions have affected the technical development of residential buildings, making it impossible for a large number of residential buildings to support a long life.

== Detail ==
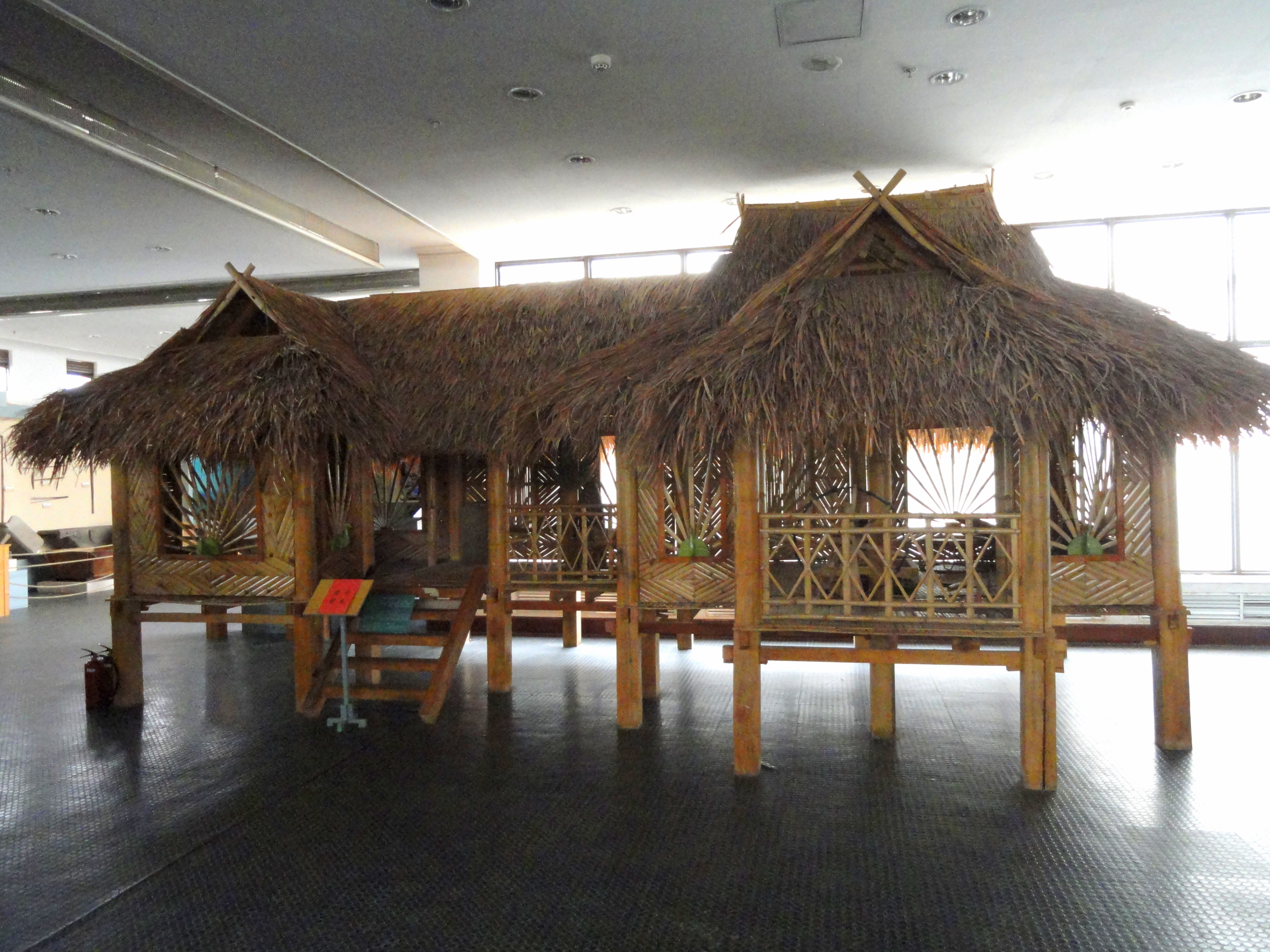
The model of Dau Bamboo house

The Dai people often live in large bamboo houses built on the wet ground in the rainforest area. There are chickens and pigs under the house, and there is a fenced garden around the house. A typical house is 10 by 10 meters high, 2 to 3 meters above the ground, supported by wood and bamboo, the walls and floors are woven with bamboo, and the roof is a sloping thatched roof supported by bamboo poles. The house is usually divided into an inner bedroom and an outer living room with a fireplace for the kitchen. Those who can afford it are covered with floors and tiled roofs.

The traditional residence of the Dai people has a spire and a second-floor balcony. Many Dai people now build houses with bricks and concrete. Some Dai houses have been influenced by the Chinese. They are built around a courtyard, only one meter above the ground, with mud-brick walls, thatched roofs, or tiled roofs.

The entire structure of a traditional Dai bamboo building is made of bamboo bundling. The walls are made of bamboo sticks (thin pieces of bamboo), while the roof is covered with straw clamped by bamboo sticks. The bamboo building is very light.

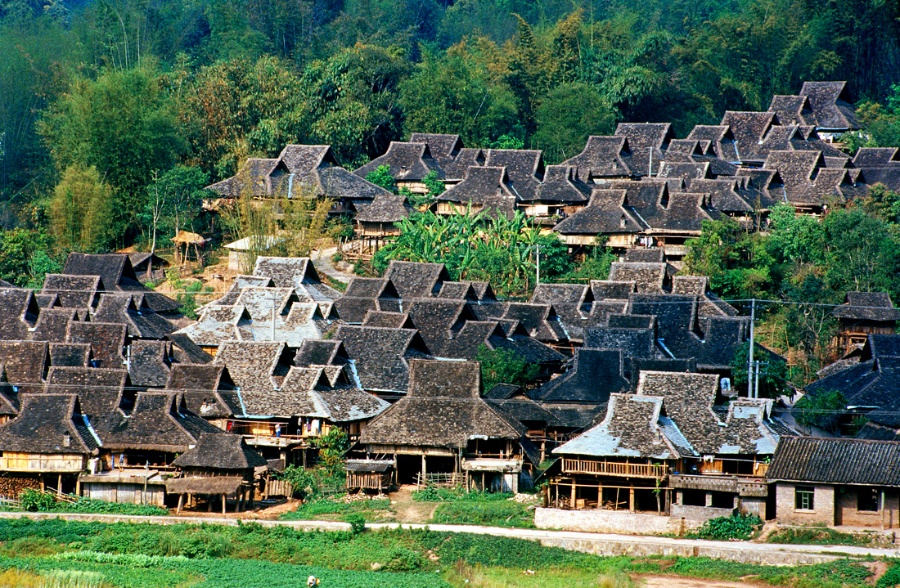
The overlook for Dai village

Dai people live in a flat river valley. When it rains heavily, the open network of pillars at the building's base allow water to flow quickly underneath the structure. Even if the river rises, bamboo sticks tied to girders can be removed to cut the buoyancy of the house to prevent it from being washed away. When the river recedes, bamboo sticks can be tied up again without affecting the structure or use. Houses like these, built on stilts, are called columnar structures and are more than 10,000 years old. Most bamboo buildings now use hardwood for column beams and local materials built into the next two floors of the small building. On the ground floor only the pillars supporting the house can be used to raise livestock and pile up sundries. The upper floor is the space where people live, and can be divided into a porch, hall, bedroom, and balcony. This kind of building does not have a courtyard. Though it covers a small area, usable space abounds. The cost of local materials is low and the building is permeable, in line with the local climate and topography.

== Types ==
The traditional bamboo house can be divided into three types—Payasangtudi, Mahasati and Henmen. In the past, the Dai bamboo house was divided into two types: the official bamboo house and the civilian bamboo house.

The officer's bamboo house is spacious and bright. It adopts the style of Western “gothic architecture”, the shape of the house is square, and the roof is shaped like a pyramid. The entire bamboo house is supported by 20 to 24 huge wooden stakes, which are built on stone. The internal shape is simple. The main room in the middle is the guest room. The living room is usually divided into two or three rooms for the owner's wife and children. The room of the officer's bamboo house is about 30 square meters and can accommodate about 20 people. Compared with the official bamboo house, the bamboo house of the people is quite narrow. The roof is covered with couch grass. The wooden pile cannot be built on stone, and figures cannot be carved on the wooden pile.

== Development ==
In the process of bamboo house development, Dai people used their talents to constantly improve their structure and materials. For example, they have learnt to place large marbles under the pillars of the house so they do not touch the ground. This prevents moisture from climbing up the pillars, thus protecting the bamboo house from decay. To make bamboo houses more durable, the Dai people have also created many bamboo and wood treatment methods. To dissolve some soluble substances such as xylose, bamboo must be saturated for months in a river or pond, spoiling the starch so it does not attract moths or parasites. Wood that must be buried underground is first burnt to make the ground harder and to give it a layer of protection.

== Disadvantages ==
Bamboo houses are vulnerable to fire. Each community sets its own rules. In the daytime of the dry season, no one is allowed to use fire; if a fire must be used, the user must go to a designated site. Bamboo houses are very rare. The house is filled with smoke and its chemical properties help it resist erosion and moths.

== Dai villages ==
The Dai people usually live in villages of about 40 households. There are as many as 100 households in the big village. These villages are usually built on rivers or creeks and usually feature tall eucalyptus trees and exquisite Buddhist temples or pagodas.

== Inheritance ==
Dai bamboo building is usually a single building, suitable for small family life. That is because Dai people follow the system of inheritance of the youngest son, which means that the older children must live independently from their parents.
