= Ultimogeniture =

Norm of youngest child as sole inheritor

Agnatic ultimogeniture diagram. The grey square is the current holder of the property, the black squares are deceased, the numbers indicate his potential successors in order of succession as things stand.

Ultimogeniture, also known as postremogeniture or junior right, is the tradition of inheritance by the last-born of a privileged position in a parent's wealth or office. The tradition has been far rarer historically than primogeniture (sole inheritance by the first-born) or partible inheritance (division of the estate among the children).

== Advantages and disadvantages ==
Ultimogeniture might be considered appropriate in circumstances in which the youngest child had been assigned the role of "keeping the hearth", taking care of the parents and continuing at home, and elder children had time and opportunity to succeed in the world and provide for themselves. In a variation on the system, elder children might have received a share of land and moveable property at a younger age such as by marrying and founding their own family. Ultimogeniture might also be considered appropriate for the estates of elderly rulers and property owners, whose children were likely to be mature adults.

Those who stand to gain from ignoring the stipulation under ultimogeniture are more likely to have the facility to do so, when compared to other succession laws. For example, under primogeniture tradition, younger siblings stand to gain if they can bypass said tradition; elder siblings, however, have more time and opportunities to gain power, wealth, experience and influence to better solidify their inheritance claim. In ultimogeniture elder siblings, especially the first born of the relevant gender, are heavily incentivized and more empowered to sidestep the tradition, especially if primogeniture inheritance is a culturally familiar concept. This can be achieved through coercion, assassination, fratricide or even patricide to move themselves up the succession order. This may be an explanation as to why primogeniture traditions tend to be more prevalent than ultimogeniture.

== Examples of use ==
- Many folkloric traditions around the world include important figures who were youngest siblings, although they are subject to various interpretations. Several important Biblical characters, including Isaac, Jacob, and David, are described as youngest sons or daughters, which has led some scholars to propose a prehistoric practice of ultimogeniture among the Hebrews, but that form of inheritance is not espoused by the preserved text. A footnote in Frazer says: "Compare Hesiod, Theog. 132 sqq. who agrees in describing the god Cronus as the youngest child of his father Uranus. As the chief deity Zeus, who succeeded his father Cronus on the heavenly throne, was likewise the youngest of his family (Hesiod, Theog. 453 sqq.), we may conjecture that among the ancient Greeks or their ancestors inheritance was at one time regulated by the custom of ultimogeniture or the succession of the younger...". In some early Greek myths, kingship was conferred by marriage to a tribal nymph, who was selected by ultimogeniture or success in a race.
- In England, patrilineal ultimogeniture (inheritance by the youngest surviving male child) was known as "Borough English", (Note: Alternatively rendered as borough English and Borough-English.) after its former practice in various ancient English boroughs. It was enforced only against those who died intestate and frequently though not universally also included the principle of inheritance by the deceased's youngest brother if there was no son. Less often, the practice was extended to the youngest daughter, sister, aunt, etc. Its origin is much disputed, but the Normans, who generally practiced primogeniture, considered it to be a Saxon legacy. A 1327 court case found it to be the practice of the English burgh at Nottingham but not of the town's "French" district. The tradition was also found across many rural areas of England in which lands were held in tenure by socage. It also occurred in copyhold manors in Hampshire, Surrey, Middlesex, Suffolk, and Sussex in which manorial custom dictated the form of inheritance to be ultimogeniture.
- In the German Duchy of Saxe-Altenburg, land holdings were traditionally passed to the youngest son, who might then employ his older brothers as farm workers.
- In India, matrilineal ultimogeniture is practiced by the Khasi people of Meghalaya in which inheritance is traditionally passed down to the youngest daughter. Although portions of the property are divided among siblings, the bulk of the share, including the "ancestral hearth", is bestowed on the youngest daughter (ka khadduh), who is also expected to take care of her aging parents and any unmarried siblings. As a consequence, marriage to the youngest daughter is uxorilocal, as opposed to marriage to the other siblings, which is neolocal.
- Among the Malabar Syrian Christian community of Kerala in southern India, the practice is a variant of ultimogeniture in which the youngest son gets the ancestral house (tharavad) and adjoining property and is expected to take care of his elderly parents. His elder brothers also get a share of the property but live separately. The daughters are granted a bounteous dowry but traditionally do not receive inheritance of property. If there are no sons, the husband of the youngest daughter is formally embraced into the family as adopted son (dathu puthran) to fulfill the role of the youngest son.
- In Japan, ultimogeniture can be seen from the mythological era with the gods, to the time of Emperor Ōjin. Additionally, in some southwestern areas of Japan, property was traditionally apportioned by a modified version of ultimogeniture known as masshi souzoku (末子相続). An estate was distributed equally among all sons or children except that the youngest received a double share as a reward for caring for the elderly parents in their last years. Official surveys conducted during the early years of the Meiji era showed that the most common family form throughout the country during the Edo period was characterized by stem structure, patrilineal descent, patrivirilocal residence and patrilineal primogeniture, but in some southwestern areas, that combination of partible inheritance and ultimogeniture was sometimes used.
- Among Mongols, each son received part of the family herd as he married, with the elder sons receiving more than the younger ones, but the ancestral seat was inherited by the youngest along with his share of the herd. Likewise, each son inherited part of the family's camping lands and pastures, with the elder sons receiving more than the younger ones but further afield from the family tent. (Family units would often remain near enough for close co-operation, but extended families would inevitably break up after a few generations.) Similarly, Genghis Khan's Mongolian Empire was divided among all four of his sons, but the Mongolian homeland was passed to his youngest, Tolui.
- The Kachin of northern Burma and southern China traditionally instruct elder sons to move away upon maturity, which leaves the youngest son to inherit the family property.
- The Dai people of southern China pass their bamboo houses down to the youngest son of the family, requiring older children to move away and live independently from their parents.
- The island of Bornholm explicitly recognized ultimogeniture in a statute dating from 1773. The practice was abolished in 1887.

== See also ==
- Inheritance
- Secundogeniture
- Succession order
- Youngest son

== Bibliography ==
- Baynes, T. S., ed. (1878), "Borough-English" , Encyclopædia Britannica, vol. 4 (9th ed.), New York: Charles Scribner's Sons, p. 64
- .
- Gardiner, Judith (ed.). The Penguin Dictionary of British History..
- Horioka, Charles Yuji. Are the Japanese Selfish, Altruistic or Dynastic? (PDF). Archived from the original (PDF) on 16 December 2005.
