= Miccosukee Land Co-op =

Community in Florida

Coordinates: 30.52°N 84.12°W

The Miccosukee Land Cooperative (MLC) is a cohousing community (a kind of intentional community). It is located near Tallahassee, in northeastern Leon County, Florida.

== Administration ==
The community consists of about 120 households and is governed by a "town council" consisting of representatives from seven "neighborhoods" within the community, overseen by a “coordinator” who is elected by a vote of the community. The defining documents of the Miccosukee Land Cooperative include the Articles of Incorporation, Bylaws, and Restrictive Covenants.

== Land tenure ==
The community includes homes owned by residents and a small number of rental homes. Membership in the community was originally limited to people whose names appear on deeds, but now includes long term residents who are not owners. Homesteads range in size from one acre (0.40 ha) to several acres each.

== Geography ==
Over 90 acres (36 ha) are maintained as a nature preserve—the Common Land owned collectively by the entire membership. Both private and shared land is heavily restricted to maintain its natural state.

== Residents and community ==
MLC members are drawn together by a desire to live in a "community of friends in the country" (the original description during the initial marketing) where the land and environment are respected and interaction between neighbors is a sought-after experience. After five decades members have come to share a sense of the meaning and practicing of community. (Some children and even grandchildren of the original residents have become MLC member-owners.) All activities, other than assessments for necessities such as taxes and insurance, are voluntary, enabling each person to choose the level of sharing and socializing preferred.

While the community is diverse in age, occupation, and religious practice, many adults are in the prime years of their careers, most working in Tallahassee as teachers and professors, working people, small business owners builders, artists, writers, and including a former county commissioner and former mayor. MLC is a voice in the region on behalf of healthy living, environmentally conscious development and wildlife preservation, and social justice. Activities are scheduled to celebrate life milestones and to support members in times of sickness or tragedy.

== Structures and environment ==
The community occupies 344 acres (139 ha). Many residents built their own homes, sometimes extending over years, with cooperation from other community members. Buildings adopt a colorful mish-mash of styles, including geodesic domes originally constructed by the Frese, Brudenell and Wilde families.

Over the years members have volunteered time to create a community center, a volunteer fire department, a swimming pool co-op, and trails through woods and wetlands teeming with flora and fauna.

Shared and individual gardens dot the landscape, and all roads are unpaved—many named after Beatles songs such as "The Long and Winding Road" and "Penny Lane". Much of the maintenance and construction the community requires is done on a volunteer basis. Said one resident, "Many of us carry the vision of more time for shared meals and sitting on the porch shelling peas, gossiping, and singing. In the meantime we walk more separate paths but always give thanks for our land and precious neighbors."

== History ==
MLC was initiated in May 1973 by James Clement van Pelt ("Jeff"), Anna Coble van Pelt, and Chris and Carol Headley under the nonprofit umbrella of the Small Change Foundation. The first members moved to the land in June 1974.

It was formed during a recession, tight financing, failing land developments, and in the midst of a "five-hundred-year flood" rain that soaked the area (but revealed where it was safe to build). The land was not yet designed, restrictions on the resale of MLC property effectively prevented speculation and the expectation of profit on resale, lowering expectations. The publicity budget totaled $50.00. However, the community was almost fully subscribed within six weeks and fully financed shortly thereafter. Each prospective member was required to attend a presentation at which the intentional and conservation aspects of the community concept were emphasized. The land was priced initially at about $2,500 per acre on terms of $200 and $35 per month per acre, with a third of the proceeds set aside for community development.

Since the available residential acreage was sold prior to the subdivision was finalized, member preferences drove the planning process, with any conflicts decided on the basis of who joined earliest—although in practice a spirit of compromise prevailed. (Several lots were planned around particular liveoak trees, one of which became a tree house residence for its owner, Laurie Dozier.) One lot is a circular. Roads were planned around those choices. For the planning charrette, members gathered over a spring weekend at the King Helie Planning Group in Orlando, most "camping" overnight in the planning offices.

=== Timeline ===
- 1973: Tallahassee residents gather at The Sun Restaurant to commission Small Change Foundation to create an ecovillage "community of friends in the country".
- 1973: Co-op founders to begin weekly “Back to the Land” public presentations (May), purchase options on first 240 acres, establish nonprofit development corp. Unplanned land pre-sold to over 100 future members: $100 deposit, $2,475 per acre. Land is planned at charrette of members and King Helie Planning Group in Orlando. Streets are named after Beatles songs. Governance ("Town Council") by six cohousing groups ("neighborhoods") begins. Five-hundred-year rain.
- 1974: First members move onto the land. The "Northwest Kingdom" (40 acres) purchased to extend MLC.
- 1974: First babies are born on the land. First community holds its first Thanksgiving.
- 1975: First Easter Garden Walk and first MLC Halloween.
- 1976: Legal possession of MLC land passes from Small Change Foundation's development corp (MLI) to MLC Inc.
- 1979: Co-op establishes the Miccosukee Land Coop Volunteer Fire Department. In the late 1980s, the department was merged with the Miccosukee Volunteer Fire Department and continues to be active.
- 1980: Sunrise Community established as MLC extension and Miccosukee Community Child Care Center begins.
- 1981: “The 39” purchased adjacent to MLC. Peacock Pass is built across Black Creek.
- 1982: MLC Community Center construction begins.
- 1984: Community holds its first Halloween Pumpkin Walk. First MLC Calendar is created.
- 1985: MLC residents work to protect canopy road. MLC playground is built.
- 1988: India Rose Alexander is the first baby born to second-generation Co-op'er. Work party rebuilds Valle house after fire. Stargazer Community established.
- 1989: First Holiday Candlelight Stroll.
- 1990: Black Creek and troll bridge boardwalks built. Hermann Frese becomes “Tractor King,” with duties that include smoothing out the community's dirt roads.
- 1992: Benefit to rebuild Reimer house. Rob Lombardo writes MLC song.
- 1993: MLC celebrates its 20th anniversary and holds its first Holiday Art Affair.
- 1994: First MLC Spring Music Festival. Residents dedicate Jessie's Grotto.
- 1997: Sports court is complete after eight years. “Dynamic Ageing” discussion begins.
- 1998: Miccosukee Greenway is established and the first MLC history video is produced.
- 1999: Leon County Historic Preservation Award is given to Friends of Miccosukee Greenway – Chuck Mitchell, Rob Lombardo and Cliff Thaell.
- 2000: Community effort stops herbicide spraying on Miccosukee Road.
- 2001: Tibetan monks visit MLC.
- 2003: Leon County agrees to re-route McCracken Road and restore Black Creek wetlands.
- 2011: Community Center expanded with the construction of a "cook deck".
- 2013: Walking trails are marked and gravelled.
- 2014: Community Center is enclosed, now with central air.
- 2018: Community celebrates 45 years since May 1973 founding.
- 2023; The community celebrates its 50th anniversary.

== See also ==
- Miccosukee Volunteer Fire-Rescue
