= Robert Gilman =

Writer on sustainability (born 1945)

Robert C. Gilman (born 1945) is an American astrophysicist who, along with his late wife Diane Gilman, researched and wrote about ecovillages. The Gilmans' work was important in giving definition to the ecovillage movement and shaping the direction of the Global Ecovillage Network. In 1991, the Gilmans co-authored Eco-Villages and Sustainable Communities, a seminal study of ecovillages for Gaia Trust.

== Early life and education ==
Gilman graduated from the University of California, Berkeley in 1967 with a bachelor's in astronomy. He received a Ph.D. in astrophysics from Princeton University in 1969. Gilman has taught and conducted research at the University of Minnesota, the Harvard Smithsonian Astrophysical Observatory and was a research associate at NASA's Institute for Space Studies.

== Career ==
In the mid 1970s, Gilman turned his attention to the study of global sustainability, futures research and strategies for positive cultural change. He and Diane designed and built their own solar home in 1975. In 1979, they founded the Context Institute, one of the earliest NGOs to focus on sustainability.

=== In Context magazine ===
The institute launched In Context: A Quarterly of Humane Sustainable Culture in 1983, with Gilman as editor. The journal won the Utne Reader Alternative Press Award for "Best Coverage of Emerging Issues" in 1991 and 1994.

== Global Action Plan and GEN ==
In 1989–92 Gilman co-developed the 'Global Action Plan Household EcoTeam Program', an early behavior-change model that organized neighbors into teams to cut household waste, water, and energy use; the model was later adopted nationwide in the Netherlands and other countries.

Building on their Gaia Trust study, Robert and Diane helped convene the 1995 Ecovillages and Sustainable Communities conference at Findhorn, Scotland, which formally launched the Global Ecovillage Network. Gilman later spent three years living in Winslow Cohousing on Bainbridge Island, Washington, to test ecovillage principles firsthand.

== Other work ==
From 2004 to 2011, Gilman was a councilman for Langley, Washington.

Gilman continues to speak on regenerative design and cultural evolution, including at Vicki Robin's 2020 "CoVida Conversations" interview series and Pakhuis de Zwijger's "Regenerative Design" forum in Amsterdam (2023)

== Personal life ==
He was married to Diane Gilman until her death in 1998 and they had two children. After Diane's death in 1998, he married Lianne in 2004.
