= Ecovillage =

Community with the goal of becoming more sustainable

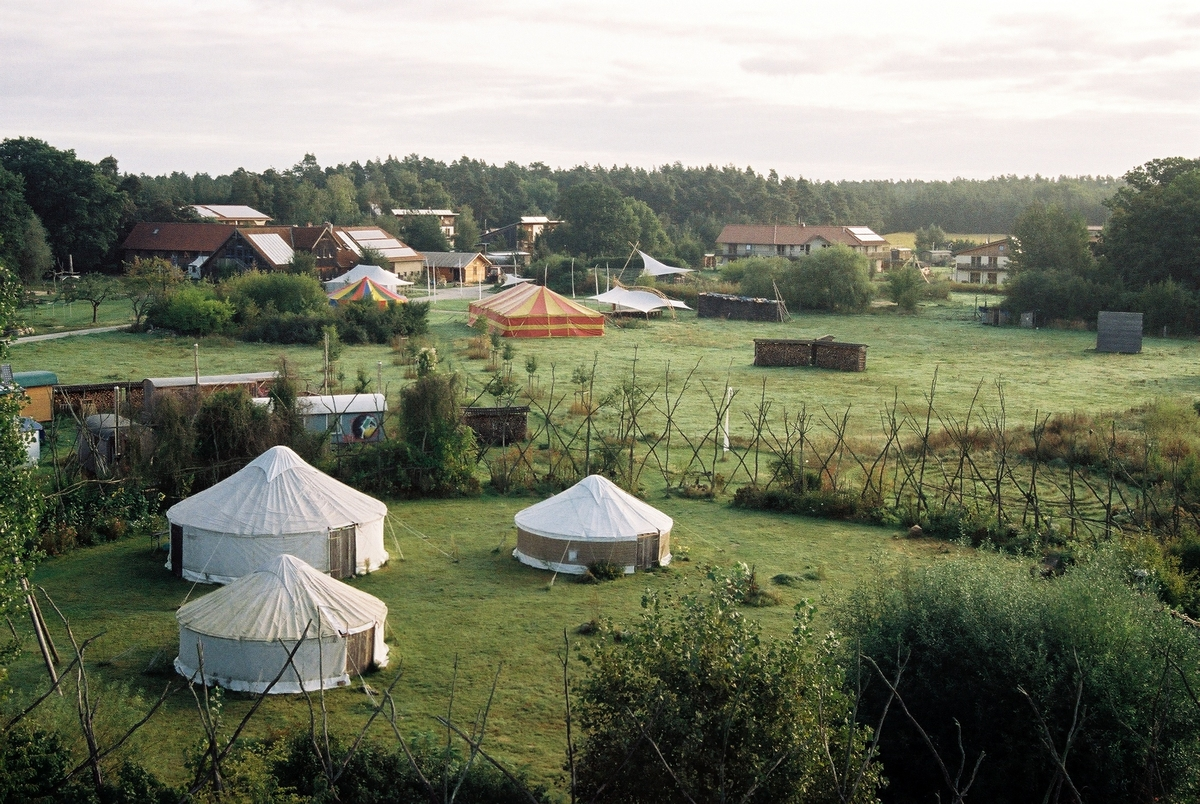
Sieben Linden Ecovillage

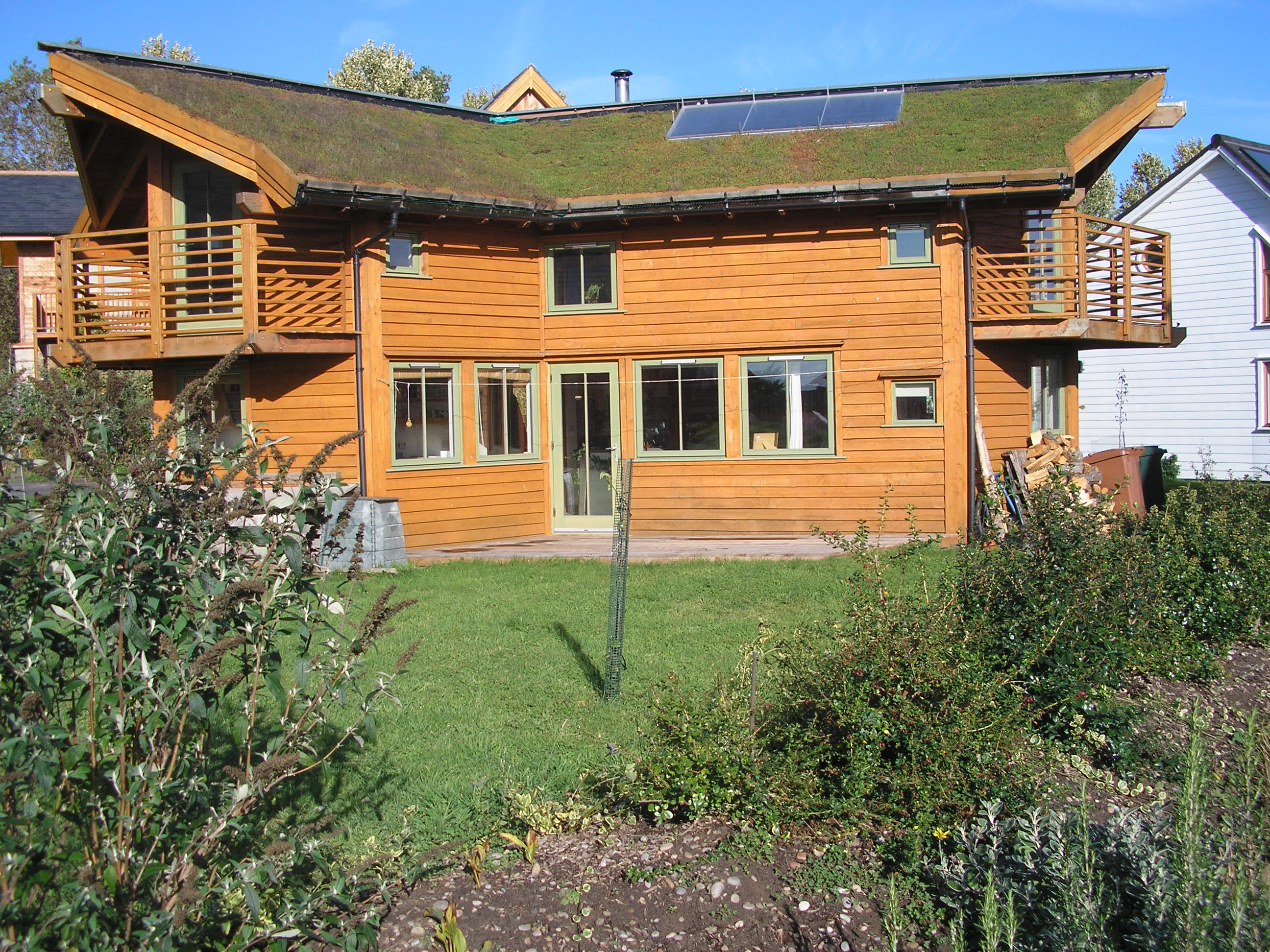
An eco-house at Findhorn Ecovillage with a turf roof and solar panels

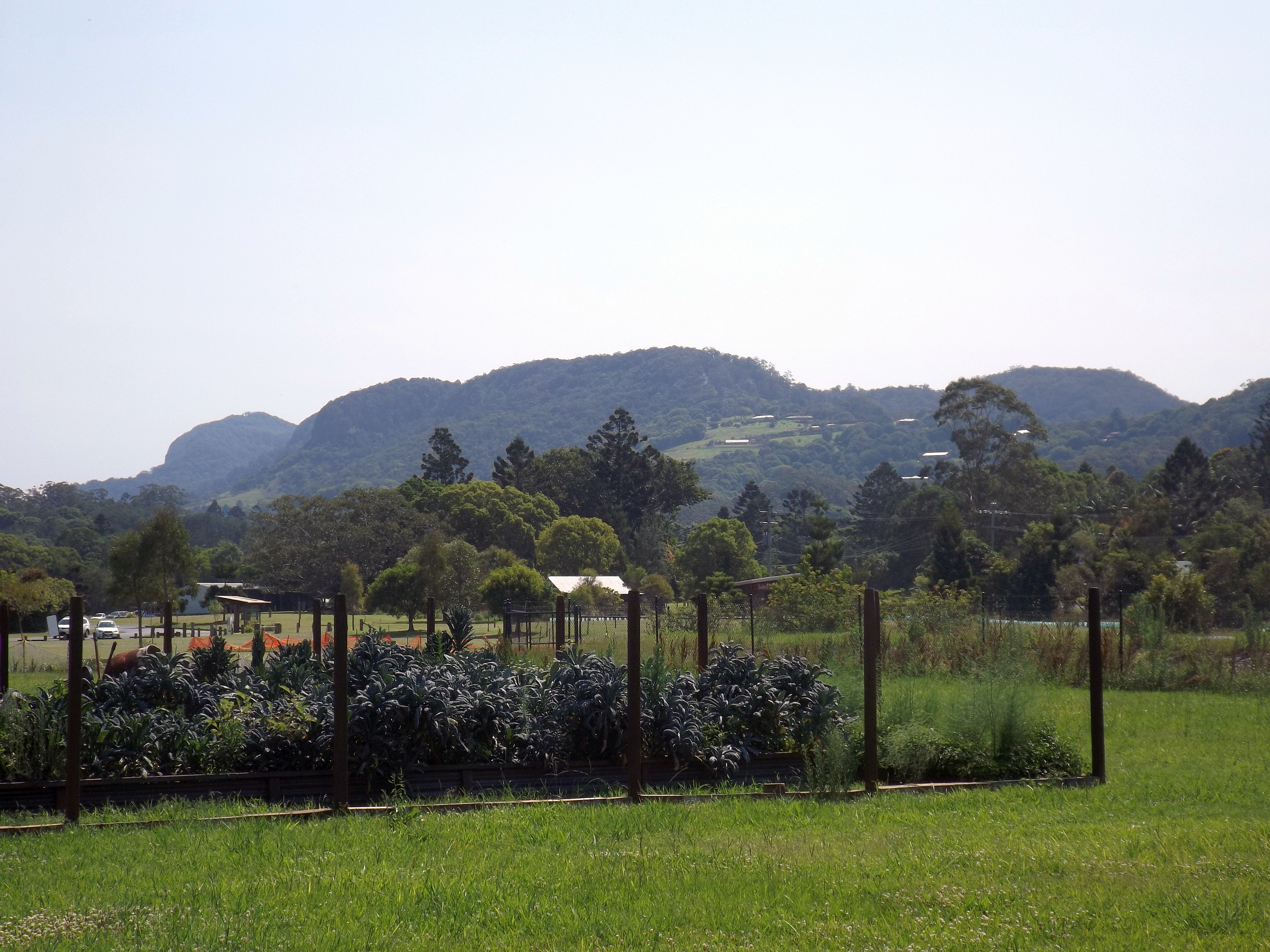
Tallebudgera Mountain and a vegetable garden at the Currumbin Ecovillage in Queensland, 2015

An ecovillage is a community whose residents work together to reduce their impact on the environment and make living more sustainable. This can involve how they build their homes, grow food, or get around. Ecovillages are usually founded as intentional communities. The Global Ecovillage Network also applies the term to existing villages and urban neighborhoods where residents work together toward environmental, social, economic, and cultural goals. Practices may include growing food together, sharing vehicle, and constructing energy-efficient buildings. Most of ecovillages have lower carbon or ecological footprints than the populations they were compared with. Some ecovillages also help restore the land around them. Early residents of Auroville in southern India used rainwater harvesting and soil conservation to help restore parts of the local forest.

The modern ecovillage movement took shape in the 1990s. Robert Gilman and Diane Gilman helped popularize the ecovillage concept in a 1991 report. Four years later, the Global Ecovillage Network was formed after a conference at Findhorn in Scotland. The network links ecovillages around the world.

== Definition ==
Multiple sources define ecovillages as a subtype of intentional communities focusing on sustainability. More pronounced definitions are listed here:

Source	Year	Definition
Robert Gilman	1991	"human-scale full-featured settlement in which human activities are harmlessly integrated into the natural world in a way that is supportive of healthy human development, and can be successfully continued into the indefinite future."
Diana Michelle Fischetti	2008	"intentional community whose members strive to live in a socially and environmentally sustainable manner, to practice voluntary simplicity, and to cultivate meaning, life satisfaction, and fulfillment."
Kosha Anja Joubert, Executive Director of the GEN	2016	"intentional or traditional communities, consciously designed through participatory process to regenerate their social and natural environments. The social, ecological, economic, and cultural aspects are integrated into a holistic sustainable development model that is adapted to local contexts. Ecovillages are rural or urban settlements with vibrant social structures, vastly diverse, yet united in their actions towards low impact, high quality lifestyles."
GEN	2018	"intentional, traditional or urban community that is consciously designed through locally owned, participatory processes in all 5 dimensions of sustainability (social, culture, ecology, economy and whole systems design) to regenerate their social and natural environments"
GEN	2024	"An ecovillage is an intentional, traditional or urban community that is consciously designed through locally owned, participatory processes in all four dimensions of sustainability (social, culture, ecology and economy) to regenerate their social and natural environments."

In Joubert's view, ecovillages are seen as an ongoing process, rather than a particular outcome. They often start off with a focus on one of the four dimensions of sustainability, e.g. ecology, but evolve into holistic models for restoration. In this view, aiming for sustainability is not enough; it is vital to restore and regenerate the fabric of life and across all four dimensions of sustainability: social, environmental, economic and cultural.

Ecovillages have developed in recent years as technology has improved, so they have more sophisticated structures as noted by Baydoun, M. 2013.

Generally, the ecovillage concept is not tied to specific sectarian (religious, political, corporate) organizations or belief systems not directly related to environmentalism, such as monasteries, cults, or communes.

== History ==
The modern-day desire for community was notably characterized by the communal "back to the land" movement of the 1960s and 1970s through communities such as the earliest example that still survives, the Miccosukee Land Co-op co-founded in May 1973 by James Clement van Pelt in Tallahassee, Florida. In the same decades, the imperative for alternatives to radically inefficient energy-use patterns, in particular automobile-enabled suburban sprawl, was brought into focus by recurrent energy crises. The term "eco-village" was introduced by Georgia Tech Professor George Ramsey in a 1978 address, "Passive Energy Applications for the Built Environment", to the First World Energy Conference of the Association of Energy Engineers, to describe small-scale, car-free, close-in developments, including suburban infill, arguing that "the great energy waste in the United States is not in its technology; it is in its lifestyle and concept of living." Ramsey's article includes a sketch for a "self-sufficient pedestrian solar village" by one of his students that looks very similar to eco-villages today.

The movement became more focused and organized in the cohousing and related alternative-community movements of the mid-1980s. Then, in 1991, Robert Gilman and Diane Gilman co-authored a germinal study called "Ecovillages and Sustainable Communities" for Gaia Trust, in which the ecological and communitarian themes were brought together.

The first ecovillage in North America began its first stages in 1990. Earthaven Ecovillage near Ashville in the Blue Ridge Mountains of western North Carolina was the first community called an ecovillage and was designed using permaculture (holistic) principles. The first residents moved onto the vacant land in 1994. As of 2025 Earthaven Ecovillage has over 75 adults and 25 children living off the grid on 329 acres of land.

The ecovillage movement began to coalesce at the annual autumn conference of Findhorn, in Scotland, in 1995. The conference was called: "Ecovillages and Sustainable Communities", and conference organizers turned away hundreds of applicants. According to Ross Jackson, "somehow they had struck a chord that resonated far and wide. The word 'ecovillage'... thus became part of the language of the Cultural Creatives." After that conference, many intentional communities, including Findhorn, began calling themselves "ecovillages", giving birth to a new movement. The Global Ecovillage Network, formed by a group of about 25 people from various countries who had attended the Findhorn conference, crystallized the event by linking hundreds of small projects from around the world, that had similar goals but had formerly operated without knowledge of each other. Gaia Trust of Denmark agreed to fund the network for its first five years.

Since the 1995 conference, a number of the early members of the Global Ecovillage Network have tried other approaches to ecovillage building in an attempt to build settlements that would be attractive to mainstream culture in order to make sustainable development more generally accepted. One of these with some degree of success is Living Villages and The Wintles where eco-houses are arranged so that social connectivity is maximized and residents have shared food growing areas, woodlands, and animal husbandry for greater sustainability.

The most recent worldwide update emerges from the 2025 Annual Report of GEN International, detailing the mapping of 1,251 ecovillage communities on GEN's interactive ecovillage map. GEN collaborated closely with a diverse array of researchers and ecovillage communities spanning the globe to develop the Ecovillage Impact Assessment. Their innovative tool serves as a means for communities, groups, and individuals to accurately report, chart, evaluate, and present their efforts toward fostering participatory cultural, social, ecological, and economic regeneration. Over the course of three years, from February 2021 to April 2024, data from 140 surveys conducted within 75 ecovillages formed the basis of the comprehensive results. Through this assessment ecovillages are empowered to understand their impact and influence their community has had.

== Case studies ==
Ecovillage	Location	Summary
Dancing Rabbit Ecovillage	Missouri, United States	The Dancing Rabbit Ecovillage was founded in 1997 and is located in a rural landscape of northeastern Missouri. This community prides itself on its organic permaculture gardens, natural buildings, alternative energy solutions, and self-governance. As an intentional community, they aim to live ecologically sustainable and socially share the principles and practices of sustainable living with others. They offer many programs such as women's retreats, work exchange and natural building workshops demonstrating how they prioritize outreach, education, and advocacy. As stated on their website they are committed stewards of the land, focusing on wildlife habitat preservation, biodiversity restoration, and sustainable forestry.
Cloughjordan	Ireland	The Cloughjordan Ecovillage was founded in 1999 and is located in a sustainable neighbourhood in rural Ireland. This community encompasses a 67-acre site and has prided itself on their fiber optic broadband, eco-hostels, and a community with over 50 homes and businesses. Cloughjordan serves as a sustainable neighborhood and is a focus for research into sustainability, resilience, and rural regeneration. Through renewable energy, community farming, and educational outreach, Cloughjordan has demonstrated the potential for transitioning to a low-carbon society. It also serves as a not-for-profit cooperative and educational charity, proving their commitment to sustainability and community development.

== Sustainability practices ==
European ecovillages surveyed in 2020 said they sought self-sufficiency in food, water and energy. They combine their own production with resources from the region. About two-thirds of those seeking energy self-sufficiency still used the electricity grid. Rainwater collection was also reported in the European survey. Narara Ecovillage in New South Wales, Australia, has its own network connecting rooftop solar panels and a shared battery.

Organic farming and permaculture are used to grow food, while collective purchasing gives residents access to produce from nearby farms. Reducing food transport emissions is another reason for buying locally. At Twin Oaks in Virginia, residents of ecovillage have worked with a local food bank to preserve and redistribute their surpluses.

Ecovillages occupy both new and existing buildings. Construction work is done with materials like straw, clay, and timber from nearby sources. At Cambium in Austria, residents have renovated buildings on a former military site.

Residents may share laundry facilities, garden tools, vehicles and bikes. Maintenance and cleaning of communal spaces are divided among all participants. A study of five European ecovillages found that three held communal meals every day. In the other two, volunteers arranged meals occasionally.

== Environmental impact ==
Ecovillage residents seek a sustainable lifestyle (for example, of voluntary simplicity) for inhabitants with a minimum of trade outside the local area, or ecoregion. Many seek independence from existing infrastructures, although others, particularly in more urban settings, pursue more integration with existing infrastructure. Rural ecovillages are usually based on organic farming, permaculture and other approaches which promote ecosystem function and biodiversity. Ecovillages, whether urban or rural, tend to integrate community and ecological values within a principle-based approach to sustainability, such as permaculture design. In 2019, a study assessed the impact of community sustainability through a life cycle assessment conducted on three ecovillages. The results of this study revealed a substantial reduction in carbon emissions among residents of these ecovillages when compared to the average United States citizen. This study reported that residents had a 63% to 71% decrease in carbon emissions due to living in an ecovillage with sustainable practices and mitigation efforts to environmental impact.

== Governance ==
Ecovillages, while united by their commitment to sustainability and communal living, often differ in their approaches to governance. Every ecovillage strives to reflect the diverse needs and values of their communities. Ultimately, the choice of governance model within ecovillages aims to demonstrates a balance between fostering community cohesion, promoting sustainability, and accommodating the varied needs and values of their members.

Establishing governance is a common method used by ecovillages to align individual actions with community objectives. Most ecovillages maintain a distinct set of policies to govern aspects of what keeps their society functioning. Policies within ecovillages are meant to evolve with new situations prompting revisions to existing guidelines. Ecovillages commonly incorporate elements of consensus decision-making into their governance processes. This approach aims to mitigate hierarchies, power imbalances, and inflexibility within their governments. The governmental framework designed in the Ecovillage Tamera, Portugal promotes inclusivity that actively works to combat hierarchical structures. The Tamera community attributes their success to their Women's Council who confront patriarchal norms and empower women within the governance system. Members of ecovillage communities will select their peers to serve as government members based on established trust within the community, this serves as an active strategy to mitigate the emergence of hierarchies. Through involvement of community members in reviewing and revising existing rules, ecovillages ensure flexibility and adaptability to evolving needs. Active participation in policy formulation fosters a sense of ownership among members regarding community expectations and boundaries. Ecovillage community members express their contentment knowing they had the opportunity to voice their concerns and contribute to the decision-making process.

Each ecovillage exhibits a unique approach to how they will develop their governance. Ecovillages acknowledge that there is a delicate balance in maintaining a functioning community that appreciates and considers the perspectives of its members. Through active involvement in the governance processes, ecovillages demonstrate a commitment to inclusivity, adaptability, and collective empowerment, demonstrating the principles of collaborative decision-making and community-driven change.

== Challenges ==
While ecovillages aim to embody admirable dimensions of sustainability and community, they are not without their challenges. One significant challenge is the initial investment required to establish or transition to an ecovillage lifestyle. The costs of acquiring land, implementing sustainable infrastructure, and maintaining communal facilities can be prohibitive for some individuals or groups making available funds a limiting factor. Conflicts can arise regarding community rules, resource allocation, or individual responsibilities, it can be difficult to maintain cohesion which can be expected in any community type. An explorative study results concluded that the perceived quality of life of residents in eco-developments rated higher perceived quality of life than residents of developments in conventional settings while still noting various challenges they experienced. Another noteworthy challenge can be limited access to resources, like land that is adequate for agriculture, available water or renewable energy potential which can limit the viability of ecovillage initiatives.

== See also ==
- Bioenergy village
- Bioneers
- Cohousing
- Communities Directory
- Deep ecology
- Den Selvforsynende Landsby
- Diggers and Dreamers
- Eco-cities
- Eco municipalities
- Ecodistrict
- Eco-communalism
- Eco-feminism
- Eco-tourism
- Garden city movement
- Green cities
- Green development
- Intentional community
- Leopold Kohr
- Low-energy house
- Principles of Intelligent Urbanism
- Retreat (survivalism)
- Sustainable habitat
- Sustainable living
- Urban vitality
