= List of townlands of County Tipperary =

This is a sortable table of the approximately 3,245 townlands of County Tipperary, Ireland.

Duplicate names occur where there is more than one townland with the same name in the county. Names marked in bold typeface are towns and villages, and the word Town appears for those entries in the Acres column.

== Townland list ==
Townland	Acres	Barony	Civil parish	Poor law union
Abbeville	943	Lower Ormond	Lorrha	Borrisokane
**Abbey**	Town	Iffa and Offa East	Inishlounaght	Clonmel
Acraboy	159	Clanwilliam	Solloghod-more	Tipperary
Acrenakirka	51	Middlethird	Mora	Cashel
Adamstown	289	Eliogarty	Templemore	Thurles
Addane	85	Upper Ormond	Dolla	Nenagh
Affoley	165	Slievardagh	Modeshil	Callan
Aghnameadle	590	Upper Ormond	Aghnameadle	Nenagh
Aghsmear	466	Ikerrin	Corbally	Roscrea
Ahane	45	Owney and Arra	Kilnarath	Nenagh
Ahenny	655	Iffa and Offa East	Newtownlennan	Carrick on Suir
Ahenny Little	84	Slievardagh	Newtownlennan	Carrick on Suir
Alleen (Hogan)	358	Clanwilliam	Donohill	Tipperary
Alleen (Hogan)	16	Clanwilliam	Rathlynin	Tipperary
Alleen (Ryan)	90	Clanwilliam	Rathlynin	Tipperary
Alleen (Ryan)	29	Clanwilliam	Donohill	Tipperary
Allengort	103	Kilnamanagh Upper	Moyaliff	Thurles
Annagh	1,432	Lower Ormond	Dorrha	Parsonstown
Annagh	612	Lower Ormond	Lorrha	Borrisokane
Annagh	387	Lower Ormond	Kilbarron	Borrisokane
Annaghannerrig	129	Lower Ormond	Dorrha	Parsonstown
Annaghbeg	240	Lower Ormond	Dromineer	Nenagh
Annaholty	1,485	Owney and Arra	Kilcomenty	Nenagh
Annesgift	318	Middlethird	Rathcool	Cashel
Annfield	397	Eliogarty	Inch	Thurles
Arbourhill	337	Middlethird	Magorban	Cashel
Arbourhill	136	Lower Ormond	Dorrha	Parsonstown
Archerstown	482	Eliogarty	Rahelty	Thurles
Ardane	2,319	Clanwilliam	Templeneiry	Tipperary
Ardavullane	540	Clanwilliam	Bruis	Tipperary
Ardbane	199	Slievardagh	Garrangibbon	Carrick on Suir
Ardbaun	51	Eliogarty	Thurles	Thurles
Ardcrony	885	Lower Ormond	Ardcrony	Nenagh
**Ardfinnan**	Town	Iffa and Offa West	Ardfinnan	Clogheen
**Ardfinnan**	Town	Iffa and Offa West	Ballybacon	Clogheen
Ardfinnan	267	Iffa and Offa West	Ardfinnan	Clogheen
Ardgeeha	78	Iffa and Offa East	St. Mary's, Clonmel	Clonmel
Ardgeeha Lower	109	Iffa and Offa East	Rathronan	Clonmel
Ardgeeha Upper	122	Iffa and Offa East	Rathronan	Clonmel
Ardgregane	157	Lower Ormond	Monsea	Nenagh
Ardkeen	143	Eliogarty	Drom	Thurles
Ardlaman	131	Clanwilliam	Solloghod-more	Tipperary
Ardloman	441	Clanwilliam	Clonpet	Tipperary
Ardmayle	192	Middlethird	Ardmayle	Cashel
Ardmayle East	256	Middlethird	Ardmayle	Cashel
Ardmayle West	262	Middlethird	Ardmayle	Cashel
Ardnagassan	93	Kilnamanagh Upper	Toem	Tipperary
Ardobireen	207	Clanwilliam	Relickmurry & Athassel	Tipperary
Ardohill	61	Clanwilliam	Emly	Tipperary
Ardragh	120	Slievardagh	Ballingarry	Callan
Ardsallagh	150	Middlethird	Rathcool	Cashel
Arragh Beg	352	Lower Ormond	Loughkeen	Borrisokane
Arragh More	414	Lower Ormond	Loughkeen	Parsonstown
Ash Hill	304	Eliogarty	Moycarky	Thurles
Ashbury	467	Ikerrin	Roscrea	Roscrea
Ashgrove	306	Clanwilliam	Templeneiry	Tipperary
Ashleypark	403	Lower Ormond	Cloghprior	Nenagh
Ashleypark	82	Lower Ormond	Knigh	Nenagh
Ashleypark	13	Lower Ormond	Ardcrony	Nenagh
Ashpark	248	Lower Ormond	Lorrha	Borrisokane
Ashwell's Lot	93	Middlethird	St. Johnbaptist	Cashel
Athasselabbey North	416	Clanwilliam	Relickmurry & Athassel	Tipperary
Athasselabbey South	399	Clanwilliam	Relickmurry & Athassel	Tipperary
Athlummon	252	Eliogarty	Rahelty	Thurles
Athnid Beg	216	Eliogarty	Athnid	Thurles
Athnid More	638	Eliogarty	Athnid	Thurles
Atshanboe (Cahill)	152	Kilnamanagh Upper	Templebeg	Thurles
Atshanboe (Launders)	336	Kilnamanagh Upper	Templebeg	Thurles
Attybrick	199	Kilnamanagh Lower	Kilpatrick	Cashel
Attyjames	169	Slievardagh	Newtownlennan	Carrick on Suir
Attykit	492	Middlethird	St. Johnbaptist	Cashel
Aughall Beg	127	Ikerrin	Templeree	Thurles
Aughall Middle	142	Ikerrin	Templeree	Thurles
Aughall More	204	Ikerrin	Templeree	Thurles
Aughavanlomaun	827	Iffa and Offa West	Newcastle	Clogheen
Aughavehir	503	Owney and Arra	Killoscully	Nenagh
Aughnacrumpane	105	Slievardagh	Ballingarry	Callan
Aughnagomaun	1,297	Middlethird	Ballysheehan	Cashel
Aughnaheela	264	Kilnamanagh Upper	Glenkeen	Thurles
Aughvallydeag	295	Kilnamanagh Upper	Toem	Tipperary
Aughvolyshane	154	Kilnamanagh Upper	Glenkeen	Thurles
Ayle	545	Clanwilliam	Toem	Tipperary
Ayle	73	Clanwilliam	Solloghod-more	Tipperary
Bahagha	588	Kilnamanagh Upper	Doon	Tipperary
**Ballagh**	Town	Kilnamanagh Lower	Clonoulty	Cashel
Ballagh	787	Clanwilliam	Templeneiry	Tipperary
Ballagh	420	Kilnamanagh Lower	Clonoulty	Cashel
Ballagh	335	Lower Ormond	Loughkeen	Parsonstown
Ballaghboy	773	Slievardagh	Graystown	Callan
Ballaghboy	592	Slievardagh	Ballingarry	Callan
Ballaghgar	295	Lower Ormond	Loughkeen	Parsonstown
Ballaghoge	100	Slievardagh	Grangemockler	Callan
Ballaghveny	92	Upper Ormond	Ballymackey	Nenagh
**Ballina**	Town	Owney and Arra	Templeachally	Nenagh
Ballina	270	Owney and Arra	Templeachally	Nenagh
Ballinaclogh	314	Clanwilliam	Relickmurry & Athassel	Tipperary
Ballinaclogh	221	Clanwilliam	Rathlynin	Tipperary
Ballinagore	71	Owney and Arra	Youghalarra	Nenagh
Ballinagross	236	Lower Ormond	Kilbarron	Borrisokane
Ballinahemery	58	Upper Ormond	Ballymackey	Nenagh
Ballinamoe	67	Owney and Arra	Youghalarra	Nenagh
Ballinamona	439	Upper Ormond	Kilkeary	Nenagh
Ballinamona	332	Middlethird	Horeabbey	Cashel
Ballinamona	177	Kilnamanagh Lower	Oughterleague	Cashel
Ballinamore	312	Iffa and Offa East	Kilsheelan	Clonmel
Ballinard	442	Middlethird	Cloneen	Cashel
Ballinard	254	Clanwilliam	Shronell	Tipperary
Ballinard	209	Clanwilliam	Rathlynin	Tipperary
Ballinattin Lower	238	Middlethird	Mora	Cashel
Ballinattin Upper	306	Middlethird	Mora	Cashel
Ballincor	194	Lower Ormond	Lorrha	Parsonstown
Ballincor	192	Middlethird	Colman	Cashel
Ballincur	174	Upper Ormond	Kilmore	Nenagh
Ballincurra	399	Upper Ormond	Kilnaneave	Nenagh
Ballincurry	420	Slievardagh	Crohane	Callan
Ballincurry	119	Upper Ormond	Kilkeary	Nenagh
Ballinderry	813	Lower Ormond	Kilbarron	Borrisokane
Ballinderry	318	Lower Ormond	Ardcrony	Borrisokane
Ballinderry	295	Iffa and Offa East	Carrick	Carrick on Suir
Ballinderry	25	Lower Ormond	Finnoe	Borrisokane
Ballindigny	95	Upper Ormond	Kilnaneave	Nenagh
Ballindoney	130	Iffa and Offa West	Ardfinnan	Clogheen
Ballindoney East	10	Iffa and Offa West	Derrygrath	Clogheen
Ballindoney West	584	Iffa and Offa West	Derrygrath	Clogheen
Ballindrummeen	154	Kilnamanagh Lower	Clonoulty	Cashel
Ballinenagh	316	Upper Ormond	Ballynaclogh	Nenagh
Ballingarrane	216	Iffa and Offa East	Kiltegan	Clonmel
Ballingarrane North	309	Iffa and Offa East	Inishlounaght	Clonmel
Ballingarrane South	9	Iffa and Offa East	Inishlounaght	Clonmel
**Ballingarry**	Town	Slievardagh	Ballingarry	Callan
Ballingarry	1,289	Lower Ormond	Ballingarry	Borrisokane
Ballingarry Lower	484	Slievardagh	Ballingarry	Callan
Ballingarry Upper	498	Slievardagh	Ballingarry	Callan
Ballingeary East	640	Iffa and Offa West	Caher	Clogheen
Ballingeary West	38	Iffa and Offa West	Caher	Clogheen
Ballingeer	341	Owney and Arra	Castletownarra	Nenagh
Ballinglanna	496	Clanwilliam	Shronell	Tipperary
Ballinhalla	237	Iffa and Offa West	Tullaghorton	Clogheen
Ballinlassa	190	Ikerrin	Templeree	Thurles
Ballinleenty	373	Clanwilliam	Clonpet	Tipperary
Ballinlina	272	Clanwilliam	Relickmurry & Athassel	Tipperary
Ballinlonty	356	Eliogarty	Kilfithmone	Thurles
Ballinlough	512	Middlethird	Colman	Cashel
Ballinlough	149	Middlethird	Colman	Cashel
Ballinlough	123	Clanwilliam	Relickmurry & Athassel	Tipperary
Ballinlough East	26	Clanwilliam	Templeneiry	Tipperary
Ballinlough West	116	Clanwilliam	Templeneiry	Tipperary
Ballinree	883	Middlethird	Ballysheehan	Cashel
Ballinree	227	Middlethird	St. Patricksrock	Cashel
Ballinree	153	Upper Ormond	Ballymackey	Nenagh
Ballinroe	661	Ikerrin	Templeree	Thurles
Ballinruan	293	Slievardagh	Grangemockler	Callan
Ballinruddery	256	Lower Ormond	Aglishcloghane	Borrisokane
Ballintaggart	1,281	Slievardagh	Ballingarry	Callan
Ballinteenoe	456	Owney and Arra	Kilmastulla	Nenagh
Ballintemple	622	Kilnamanagh Lower	Ballintemple	Cashel
Ballintemple	211	Middlethird	Rathcool	Cashel
Ballintogher	551	Slievardagh	Graystown	Cashel
Ballintogher	275	Slievardagh	Killenaule	Cashel
Ballintotty	761	Upper Ormond	Lisbunny	Nenagh
Ballinulty	632	Clanwilliam	Cullen	Tipperary
**Ballinunty**	Town	Slievardagh	Kilcooly	Cashel
**Ballinunty**	Town	Slievardagh	Killenaule	Cashel
Ballinunty	241	Slievardagh	Kilcooly	Urlingford
Ballinunty	218	Slievardagh	Graystown	Urlingford
Ballinure	853	Slievardagh	Graystown	Cashel
Ballinurra	886	Iffa and Offa East	Newtownlennan	Carrick on Suir
Ballinvasa	224	Clanwilliam	Donohill	Tipperary
Ballinvee	120	Clanwilliam	Tipperary	Tipperary
Ballinveny	849	Upper Ormond	Aghnameadle	Nenagh
Ballinvilla	53	Lower Ormond	Ardcrony	Nenagh
Ballinvir	369	Slievardagh	Templemichael	Carrick on Suir
Ballinvoher	208	Iffa and Offa East	Kilgrant	Clonmel
Ballinvreena	379	Clanwilliam	Emly	Tipperary
Ballinwear	171	Lower Ormond	Kilruane	Nenagh
Bally Beg	1,691	Eliogarty	Twomileborris	Thurles
Ballyalla	221	Lower Ormond	Killodiernan	Nenagh
Ballyallavoe	86	Iffa and Offa West	Caher	Clogheen
Ballyanny Lower	390	Lower Ormond	Knigh	Nenagh
Ballyanny Upper	239	Lower Ormond	Knigh	Nenagh
Ballyannymore	369	Lower Ormond	Knigh	Nenagh
Ballyanrahan	270	Upper Ormond	Kilmore	Nenagh
Ballyard	630	Owney and Arra	Kilcomenty	Nenagh
Ballyartella	231	Lower Ormond	Dromineer	Nenagh
Ballyartella	54	Lower Ormond	Monsea	Nenagh
Ballybeg	730	Upper Ormond	Aghnameadle	Nenagh
Ballybeg	302	Iffa and Offa West	Tullaghmelan	Clogheen
Ballybeg	129	Iffa and Offa East	Newchapel	Clonmel
Ballybeg	29	Clanwilliam	Kilmucklin	Tipperary
Ballyboe	615	Iffa and Offa East	Temple-etney	Clonmel
Ballybough	163	Middlethird	Rathcool	Cashel
Ballyboy	523	Kilnamanagh Upper	Upperchurch	Thurles
Ballyboy East	725	Iffa and Offa West	Tullaghorton	Clogheen
Ballyboy West	595	Iffa and Offa West	Tullaghorton	Clogheen
Ballybrack	238	Kilnamanagh Lower	Donohill	Tipperary
Ballybrada	341	Iffa and Offa West	Caher	Clogheen
Ballybrien	55	Clanwilliam	Solloghod-more	Tipperary
Ballybristy	403	Eliogarty	Loughmoe West	Thurles
Ballybronoge	196	Slievardagh	Newtownlennan	Carrick on Suir
Ballybrunoge	45	Clanwilliam	Cullen	Tipperary
Ballycahane	241	Owney and Arra	Killoscully	Nenagh
Ballycahill	1,028	Eliogarty	Templemore	Thurles
Ballycahill	405	Eliogarty	Ballycahill	Thurles
Ballycahill	232	Upper Ormond	Kilmore	Nenagh
Ballycamus	596	Eliogarty	Holycross	Thurles
Ballycapple	814	Lower Ormond	Modreeny	Borrisokane
Ballycapplewood	209	Lower Ormond	Modreeny	Borrisokane
Ballycarn	284	Upper Ormond	Dolla	Nenagh
Ballycarrane	238	Eliogarty	Thurles	Thurles
Ballycarridoge	150	Owney and Arra	Castletownarra	Nenagh
Ballycarron	561	Clanwilliam	Relickmurry & Athassel	Tipperary
Ballycasey	289	Lower Ormond	Uskane	Borrisokane
**Ballyclerahan**	Town	Iffa and Offa East	Ballyclerahan	Clonmel
Ballyclerahan	1,014	Iffa and Offa East	Ballyclerahan	Clonmel
Ballycohy	524	Clanwilliam	Shronell	Tipperary
Ballycolliton	399	Lower Ormond	Kilbarron	Borrisokane
Ballycomisk	308	Middlethird	St. Patricksrock	Cashel
Ballycommon	350	Lower Ormond	Monsea	Nenagh
Ballyconnor	649	Upper Ormond	Aghnameadle	Nenagh
Ballyconry	164	Clanwilliam	Shronell	Tipperary
Ballycormuck	265	Lower Ormond	Aglishcloghane	Borrisokane
Ballycornane	188	Iffa and Offa East	Newchapel	Clonmel
Ballycorrigan	210	Owney and Arra	Templeachally	Nenagh
Ballycraggan	330	Lower Ormond	Killodiernan	Nenagh
Ballycrana	382	Clanwilliam	Clonbeg	Tipperary
Ballycrehane	407	Clanwilliam	Clonbeg	Tipperary
Ballycrenede	18	Upper Ormond	Ballynaclogh	Nenagh
Ballycrenode	354	Upper Ormond	Kilkeary	Nenagh
Ballycrine	323	Ikerrin	Corbally	Roscrea
Ballycuddy Beg	41	Owney and Arra	Burgesbeg	Nenagh
Ballycuddy More	98	Owney and Arra	Burgesbeg	Nenagh
Ballycullin	817	Slievardagh	Kilvemnon	Callan
Ballycurkeen	310	Iffa and Offa East	Kilmurry	Carrick on Suir
Ballycurrane	331	Clanwilliam	Emly	Tipperary
Ballydaff	225	Kilnamanagh Upper	Glenkeen	Thurles
Ballydavid	1,686	Clanwilliam	Templeneiry	Tipperary
Ballydavid	831	Eliogarty	Twomileborris	Thurles
Ballydavid	621	Slievardagh	Kilvemnon	Callan
Ballydine	445	Iffa and Offa East	Kilmurry	Carrick on Suir
Ballydine	311	Iffa and Offa East	Kilsheelan	Clonmel
Ballydine	60	Middlethird	Ardmayle	Cashel
Ballydonagh	173	Clanwilliam	Donohill	Tipperary
Ballydonnell	893	Slievardagh	Lismalin	Callan
Ballydoyle	581	Middlethird	St. Patricksrock	Cashel
Ballydrehid	1,985	Clanwilliam	Killardry	Tipperary
Ballydrinan	176	Lower Ormond	Monsea	Nenagh
Ballydrinan	157	Iffa and Offa West	Tubbrid	Clogheen
Ballydrinan	32	Lower Ormond	Dromineer	Nenagh
Ballyduag	154	Eliogarty	Loughmoe East	Thurles
Ballyduagh	249	Middlethird	Railstown	Cashel
Ballyduagh	66	Middlethird	St. Patricksrock	Cashel
Ballyduff	554	Lower Ormond	Dorrha	Parsonstown
Ballyduggan	417	Slievardagh	Kilvemnon	Callan
Ballyea	662	Lower Ormond	Dorrha	Parsonstown
Ballyea	98	Iffa and Offa West	Tubbrid	Clogheen
Ballyea North	335	Owney and Arra	Templeachally	Nenagh
Ballyea South	138	Owney and Arra	Templeachally	Nenagh
Ballyerk	306	Eliogarty	Moyne	Thurles
Ballyerk	233	Eliogarty	Twomileborris	Thurles
Ballyfinboy	67	Lower Ormond	Finnoe	Borrisokane
Ballyfowloo	369	Middlethird	St. Patricksrock	Cashel
Ballygambon	451	Middlethird	Baptistgrange	Cashel
Ballygammane	274	Eliogarty	Thurles	Thurles
Ballygarrane	211	Iffa and Offa West	Tubbrid	Clogheen
Ballygarrane	122	Kilnamanagh Lower	Kilmore	Cashel
Ballygasheen	741	Upper Ormond	Ballynaclogh	Nenagh
Ballygerald East	504	Middlethird	Knockgraffon	Cashel
Ballygerald West	34	Middlethird	Knockgraffon	Cashel
Ballygibbon	622	Upper Ormond	Ballygibbon	Nenagh
Ballyglasheen	370	Clanwilliam	Kilfeakle	Tipperary
Ballyglasheen	249	Iffa and Offa East	Kilsheelan	Clonmel
Ballyglasheen Little	83	Iffa and Offa East	Kilsheelan	Clonmel
Ballyglass Lower	91	Clanwilliam	Clonpet	Tipperary
Ballyglass Lower	25	Clanwilliam	Cordangan	Tipperary
Ballyglass Upper	228	Clanwilliam	Clonpet	Tipperary
Ballyglass Upper	106	Clanwilliam	Cordangan	Tipperary
Ballygodoon	330	Clanwilliam	Solloghod-more	Tipperary
Ballygorteen	505	Clanwilliam	Clonbullogue	Tipperary
Ballygorteen	318	Ikerrin	Corbally	Roscrea
Ballygown North	15	Upper Ormond	Kilmore	Nenagh
Ballygown South	83	Upper Ormond	Kilmore	Nenagh
Ballygraigue	197	Upper Ormond	Nenagh	Nenagh
Ballygriffin	382	Clanwilliam	Ballygriffin	Tipperary
Ballygriffin	10	Clanwilliam	Relickmurry & Athassel	Tipperary
Ballyhaden	147	Lower Ormond	Borrisokane	Borrisokane
Ballyhane	362	Upper Ormond	Kilnaneave	Nenagh
Ballyhane East	109	Kilnamanagh Upper	Toem	Tipperary
Ballyhane West	108	Kilnamanagh Upper	Toem	Tipperary
Ballyhasty	330	Lower Ormond	Modreeny	Borrisokane
Ballyhaugh	514	Lower Ormond	Aglishcloghane	Borrisokane
Ballyheen	156	Eliogarty	Templemore	Thurles
Ballyheens	134	Middlethird	Ballysheehan	Cashel
Ballyhenebery	157	Iffa and Offa West	Caher	Clogheen
Ballyhenry	233	Ikerrin	Bourney	Roscrea
Ballyherberry	569	Middlethird	Ballysheehan	Cashel
Ballyhickey	103	Iffa and Offa West	Rochestown	Clogheen
Ballyhimikin	445	Lower Ormond	Monsea	Nenagh
Ballyhimikin	279	Iffa and Offa East	Newchapel	Clonmel
Ballyhisky	193	Owney and Arra	Burgesbeg	Nenagh
Ballyhist	124	Iffa and Offa West	Ballybacon	Clogheen
Ballyhistbeg	110	Iffa and Offa West	Tullaghorton	Clogheen
Ballyhogan	344	Lower Ormond	Knigh	Nenagh
Ballyhogan	189	Owney and Arra	Burgesbeg	Nenagh
Ballyhohan	146	Iffa and Offa West	Tubbrid	Clogheen
Ballyholahan East	424	Clanwilliam	Emly	Tipperary
Ballyholahan West	242	Clanwilliam	Emly	Tipperary
Ballyhomuck	345	Middlethird	Cloneen	Cashel
Ballyhone	308	Clanwilliam	Emly	Tipperary
Ballyhourigan	514	Owney and Arra	Killoscully	Nenagh
Ballyhow	80	Upper Ormond	Kilmore	Nenagh
Ballyhuddy	142	Eliogarty	Moycarky	Thurles
Ballyhurrow	1,118	Iffa and Offa West	Shanrahan	Clogheen
Ballyhusty	511	Clanwilliam	Templenoe	Tipperary
Ballykeevin	346	Clanwilliam	Solloghod-more	Tipperary
Ballykeevin	65	Clanwilliam	Toem	Tipperary
Ballykelly	803	Ikerrin	Bourney	Roscrea
Ballykelly	243	Middlethird	Ballysheehan	Cashel
Ballykerin	348	Slievardagh	Crohane	Callan
Ballykinalee	386	Owney and Arra	Kilcomenty	Nenagh
Ballykinash	473	Lower Ormond	Loughkeen	Parsonstown
Ballykisteen	178	Clanwilliam	Solloghod-more	Tipperary
Ballyknock	250	Middlethird	St. Patricksrock	Cashel
Ballyknockane	1,562	Iffa and Offa East	Temple-etney	Clonmel
Ballyknockane	724	Ikerrin	Templetuohy	Thurles
Ballyknockane	356	Iffa and Offa West	Tullaghorton	Clogheen
Ballyknockane	296	Upper Ormond	Ballymackey	Nenagh
Ballylaffin	295	Iffa and Offa West	Tubbrid	Clogheen
Ballylahy	266	Ikerrin	Templetuohy	Thurles
Ballylanigan (Cramer)	258	Slievardagh	Kilvemnon	Callan
Ballylanigan (Pennefather)	216	Slievardagh	Kilvemnon	Callan
Ballylegan	262	Iffa and Offa West	Caher	Clogheen
Ballylina	46	Lower Ormond	Ballingarry	Borrisokane
Ballylina East	221	Lower Ormond	Uskane	Borrisokane
Ballylina West	521	Lower Ormond	Uskane	Borrisokane
Ballyloughnane	238	Lower Ormond	Loughkeen	Parsonstown
Ballylusky	732	Lower Ormond	Ardcrony	Borrisokane
Ballylusky	345	Middlethird	Magowry	Cashel
Ballylynch	314	Iffa and Offa East	Carrick	Carrick on Suir
Ballymacadam (Austin)	2	Iffa and Offa West	Caher	Clogheen
Ballymacadam East	63	Iffa and Offa West	Caher	Clogheen
Ballymacadam West	447	Iffa and Offa West	Caher	Clogheen
Ballymacady	427	Clanwilliam	Kilfeakle	Tipperary
Ballymacegan	1,849	Lower Ormond	Lorrha	Borrisokane
Ballymacegan Island	33	Lower Ormond	Lorrha	Borrisokane
Ballymackane	30	Middlethird	St. Patricksrock	Cashel
Ballymackeogh	1,002	Owney and Arra	Kilvellane	Nenagh
Ballymackey	162	Upper Ormond	Ballymackey	Nenagh
Ballymacue	115	Upper Ormond	Kilruane	Nenagh
Ballymagree	44	Upper Ormond	Kilruane	Nenagh
Ballymalone Beg	157	Owney and Arra	Templeachally	Nenagh
Ballymalone More	414	Owney and Arra	Templeachally	Nenagh
Ballymassy	281	Lower Ormond	Aglishcloghane	Borrisokane
Ballymassy Little	41	Lower Ormond	Aglishcloghane	Borrisokane
Ballymoheen	181	Ikerrin	Rathnaveoge	Roscrea
Ballymona	422	Lower Ormond	Ballingarry	Borrisokane
Ballymore	1,228	Kilnamanagh Lower	Clonoulty	Cashel
Ballymorris	286	Clanwilliam	Killardry	Tipperary
Ballymorris	59	Iffa and Offa West	Tullaghmelan	Clogheen
Ballymoylin	257	Owney and Arra	Youghalarra	Nenagh
Ballymurreen	367	Eliogarty	Ballymurreen	Thurles
Ballynaclera	6	Middlethird	Kiltinan	Clonmel
Ballynaclogh	1,094	Upper Ormond	Ballynaclogh	Nenagh
Ballynacloghy	315	Slievardagh	Isertkieran	Callan
Ballynacloona	400	Iffa and Offa East	Kilmurry	Carrick on Suir
Ballynacourty	1,054	Clanwilliam	Clonbeg	Tipperary
Ballynacree	500	Clanwilliam	Emly	Tipperary
Ballynadruckilly	179	Clanwilliam	Lattin	Tipperary
Ballynagleragh	340	Clanwilliam	Bruis	Tipperary
Ballynagrana	417	Clanwilliam	Emly	Tipperary
Ballynagrana	279	Iffa and Offa East	Carrick	Carrick on Suir
Ballynagrana	253	Iffa and Offa East	Newtownlennan	Carrick on Suir
Ballynahinch	1,409	Clanwilliam	Ballygriffin	Tipperary
Ballynahinch	467	Owney and Arra	Kilcomenty	Nenagh
Ballynahinch	260	Lower Ormond	Ballingarry	Borrisokane
Ballynahow	1,379	Eliogarty	Ballycahill	Thurles
Ballynahow	332	Clanwilliam	Bruis	Tipperary
Ballynahow	145	Kilnamanagh Upper	Glenkeen	Thurles
Ballynakill	707	Ikerrin	Rathnaveoge	Roscrea
Ballynalick	448	Upper Ormond	Lisbunny	Nenagh
Ballynamoe	74	Ikerrin	Rathnaveoge	Roscrea
Ballynamona	555	Iffa and Offa East	Kilmurry	Carrick on Suir
Ballynamona	206	Iffa and Offa West	Caher	Clogheen
Ballynamona	195	Lower Ormond	Finnoe	Borrisokane
Ballynamona	193	Eliogarty	Twomileborris	Thurles
Ballynamona	156	Iffa and Offa West	Molough	Clogheen
Ballynamrossagh	700	Clanwilliam	Bruis	Tipperary
Ballynamuddagh	135	Iffa and Offa West	Tullaghmelan	Clogheen
Ballynamurrag	222	Upper Ormond	Kilruane	Nenagh
Ballynamurrag	151	Lower Ormond	Kilruane	Nenagh
Ballynanoose	617	Owney and Arra	Killoscully	Nenagh
Ballynaraha	713	Iffa and Offa East	Kilsheelan	Clonmel
Ballynastick	380	Slievardagh	Buolick	Urlingford
Ballynatona	395	Iffa and Offa West	Shanrahan	Clogheen
Ballynaveen	425	Clanwilliam	Emly	Tipperary
Ballynavin	484	Lower Ormond	Modreeny	Borrisokane
Ballyneety	331	Iffa and Offa West	Neddans	Clogheen
Ballyneety	97	Iffa and Offa West	Tullaghmelan	Clogheen
Ballyneety	63	Iffa and Offa West	Ardfinnan	Clogheen
Ballyneill	825	Iffa and Offa East	Kilmurry	Carrick on Suir
Ballyneill	155	Clanwilliam	Donohill	Tipperary
Ballynennan	122	Middlethird	Drangan	Cashel
Ballynennan (Lloyd)	609	Middlethird	Drangan	Cashel
Ballynera	104	Kilnamanagh Upper	Moyaliff	Thurles
Ballynevin	230	Iffa and Offa East	Killaloan	Clonmel
Ballynilard	702	Clanwilliam	Tipperary	Tipperary
Ballynomasna	383	Iffa and Offa West	Tubbrid	Clogheen
Ballynoran	607	Iffa and Offa East	Kilmurry	Carrick on Suir
Ballynough	314	Ikerrin	Bourney	Roscrea
Ballyoughter	482	Lower Ormond	Dorrha	Parsonstown
Ballyoughter	171	Kilnamanagh Upper	Moyaliff	Thurles
Ballypadeen	143	Middlethird	St. Patricksrock	Cashel
Ballypatrick	825	Iffa and Offa East	Temple-etney	Clonmel
Ballypatrick	544	Eliogarty	Inch	Thurles
Ballyphilip	417	Slievardagh	Ballingarry	Callan
Ballyphilip	339	Upper Ormond	Kilmore	Nenagh
Ballyphilip	221	Slievardagh	Crohane	Callan
Ballyphilip	172	Clanwilliam	Solloghod-more	Tipperary
Ballyphilips	422	Ikerrin	Templeree	Thurles
**Ballyporeen**	Town	Iffa and Offa West	Templetenny	Clogheen
Ballyporeen	150	Iffa and Offa West	Templetenny	Clogheen
Ballyquinleva	104	Lower Ormond	Finnoe	Borrisokane
Ballyquinleva	80	Lower Ormond	Finnoe	Borrisokane
Ballyquirk	1,023	Lower Ormond	Lorrha	Borrisokane
Ballyquiveen	100	Upper Ormond	Ballynaclogh	Nenagh
Ballyrichard	415	Middlethird	Drangan	Cashel
Ballyrichard	234	Iffa and Offa East	Carrick	Carrick on Suir
Ballyrichard	222	Iffa and Offa East	Newtownlennan	Carrick on Suir
Ballyrickane	147	Clanwilliam	Donohill	Tipperary
Ballyrickard	343	Lower Ormond	Ardcrony	Nenagh
Ballyrickard	324	Lower Ormond	Ardcrony	Borrisokane
Ballyroan	79	Kilnamanagh Upper	Glenkeen	Thurles
Ballyrobin	275	Clanwilliam	Kilcornan	Tipperary
Ballyrobin	82	Clanwilliam	Donohill	Tipperary
Ballyroe	154	Middlethird	Ardmayle	Cashel
Ballyrourke	358	Lower Ormond	Uskane	Borrisokane
Ballyrusheen	94	Owney and Arra	Youghalarra	Nenagh
Ballyryan East	176	Clanwilliam	Solloghod-more	Tipperary
Ballyryan West	254	Clanwilliam	Solloghod-more	Tipperary
Ballyscanlan	285	Lower Ormond	Kilbarron	Borrisokane
Ballysheeda	581	Kilnamanagh Lower	Donohill	Tipperary
Ballysheeda	10	Kilnamanagh Lower	Aghacrew	Tipperary
Ballysheehan	403	Middlethird	Ballysheehan	Cashel
Ballysheehan	244	Iffa and Offa West	Shanrahan	Clogheen
Ballysimon	35	Clanwilliam	Kilmucklin	Tipperary
Ballyslatteen	488	Clanwilliam	Relickmurry & Athassel	Tipperary
Ballyslea	192	Ikerrin	Rathnaveoge	Roscrea
Ballysorrell	523	Ikerrin	Killavinoge	Roscrea
Ballysorrell	369	Ikerrin	Killavinoge	Roscrea
Ballyspellane	208	Lower Ormond	Uskane	Borrisokane
Ballyspellane	141	Lower Ormond	Uskane	Borrisokane
Ballysteena	176	Lower Ormond	Modreeny	Borrisokane
Ballytarsna	104	Iffa and Offa East	Newchapel	Clonmel
Ballytarsna (Hackett)	1,190	Middlethird	Ballysheehan	Cashel
Ballythomas	153	Lower Ormond	Ardcrony	Nenagh
Ballytohil	185	Slievardagh	Kilvemnon	Carrick on Suir
Ballytohil	25	Slievardagh	Grangemockler	Carrick on Suir
Ballytrehy	139	Iffa and Offa West	Tullaghorton	Clogheen
Ballyvada	335	Clanwilliam	Relickmurry & Athassel	Tipperary
Ballyvadin	277	Middlethird	Magorban	Cashel
Ballyvadin	176	Middlethird	Rathcool	Cashel
Ballyvadlea	316	Slievardagh	Isertkieran	Callan
Ballyvadlea	272	Middlethird	Cloneen	Cashel
Ballyvaheen	194	Iffa and Offa East	Newchapel	Clonmel
Ballyvanran	250	Upper Ormond	Ballynaclogh	Nenagh
Ballyvarra	153	Middlethird	Drangan	Cashel
Ballyvaughan	355	Iffa and Offa East	Kilgrant	Clonmel
Ballyvaughan	217	Owney and Arra	Castletownarra	Nenagh
Ballyveelish North	219	Iffa and Offa East	Newchapel	Clonmel
Ballyveelish South	150	Iffa and Offa East	Newchapel	Clonmel
Ballyveera	149	Iffa and Offa West	Ballybacon	Clogheen
Ballyverassa	127	Iffa and Offa West	Tubbrid	Clogheen
Ballyviggane	89	Clanwilliam	Templeneiry	Tipperary
Ballyvillane	131	Lower Ormond	Nenagh	Nenagh
Ballyvirane	253	Clanwilliam	Templeneiry	Tipperary
Ballyvistea	629	Clanwilliam	Emly	Tipperary
Ballyvoneen	274	Slievardagh	Modeshil	Callan
Ballyvoneen	185	Eliogarty	Holycross	Thurles
Ballywalter	562	Slievardagh	Kilvemnon	Callan
Ballywalter	293	Kilnamanagh Lower	Oughterleague	Cashel
Ballywilliam	475	Iffa and Offa West	Templetenny	Clogheen
Ballywilliam	229	Owney and Arra	Burgesbeg	Nenagh
Ballywilliam	213	Owney and Arra	Castletownarra	Nenagh
Ballywire	558	Clanwilliam	Clonbeg	Tipperary
Bannamore	46	Iffa and Offa West	Mortlestown	Clogheen
Bannixtown	441	Middlethird	Coolmundry	Cashel
**Bansha**	Town	Clanwilliam	Templeneiry	Tipperary
Bansha East	125	Clanwilliam	Templeneiry	Tipperary
Bansha West	509	Clanwilliam	Templeneiry	Tipperary
Bantis	531	Upper Ormond	Ballygibbon	Nenagh
Baptistgrange	458	Middlethird	Baptistgrange	Cashel
Barbaha	785	Owney and Arra	Youghalarra	Nenagh
Barn Demesne	612	Iffa and Offa East	Inishlounaght	Clonmel
Barn Demesne	71	Iffa and Offa East	Newchapel	Clonmel
Barna	334	Owney and Arra	Kilvellane	Nenagh
Barnabaun	308	Owney and Arra	Killoscully	Nenagh
Barnagore	484	Upper Ormond	Dolla	Nenagh
Barnagouloge	109	Lower Ormond	Modreeny	Borrisokane
Barnagree	56	Ikerrin	Roscrea	Roscrea
Barnahown	1,437	Iffa and Offa West	Templetenny	Clogheen
Barnalascaw	18	Eliogarty	Templemore	Thurles
Barnalisheen	703	Ikerrin	Templetuohy	Thurles
Barnanalleen	239	Clanwilliam	Solloghod-more	Tipperary
Barnane	2,166	Ikerrin	Barnane-ely	Roscrea
Barnane	191	Ikerrin	Killea	Roscrea
Barnlough	916	Clanwilliam	Templeneiry	Tipperary
Barnora	264	Iffa and Offa West	Caher	Clogheen
Baronstown	512	Eliogarty	Loughmoe East	Thurles
Barracurragh	168	Kilnamanagh Upper	Ballycahill	Thurles
Barravie	166	Upper Ormond	Kilmore	Nenagh
Barrettsgrange	358	Middlethird	Barrettsgrange	Cashel
Barrettstown	372	Middlethird	Barrettsgrange	Cashel
Barronstown (Laffan)	234	Clanwilliam	Tipperary	Tipperary
Barronstown (Ormond)	255	Clanwilliam	Shronell	Tipperary
Barronstown (Ormond)	157	Clanwilliam	Tipperary	Tipperary
Bartoose	378	Clanwilliam	Emly	Tipperary
Bauraglanna	1,355	Owney and Arra	Killoscully	Nenagh
Baurnadomeeny	1,270	Owney and Arra	Abington	Nenagh
Baurroe	331	Upper Ormond	Latteragh	Nenagh
Baurstookeen	34	Clanwilliam	Relickmurry & Athassel	Tipperary
Bawn	346	Upper Ormond	Kilmore	Nenagh
Bawn	145	Upper Ormond	Nenagh	Nenagh
Bawnakey	150	Owney and Arra	Youghalarra	Nenagh
Bawnanattin	34	Eliogarty	Thurles	Thurles
Bawnatanvoher	25	Middlethird	Kilbragh	Cashel
Bawnavrona Lower	236	Slievardagh	Kilvemnon	Callan
Bawnavrona Upper	173	Slievardagh	Kilvemnon	Callan
Bawnbrack	168	Clanwilliam	Relickmurry & Athassel	Tipperary
Bawnkeal	17	Middlethird	Coolmundry	Cashel
Bawnlea	259	Slievardagh	Kilcooly	Urlingford
Bawnmacshane	17	Middlethird	Cloneen	Cashel
Bawnmadrum	347	Ikerrin	Bourney	Roscrea
Bawnmadrum North	301	Ikerrin	Bourney	Roscrea
Bawnmore	569	Middlethird	Ardmayle	Cashel
Bawnmore	154	Lower Ormond	Uskane	Borrisokane
Bawnreagh	436	Slievardagh	Buolick	Urlingford
Bawnrickard	211	Slievardagh	Kilvemnon	Callan
Bawntameena	131	Eliogarty	Thurles	Thurles
Baynanagh	131	Upper Ormond	Aghnameadle	Nenagh
Beakstown	728	Eliogarty	Holycross	Thurles
Bealaclave	815	Owney and Arra	Abington	Nenagh
Beeverstown	370	Slievardagh	Isertkieran	Callan
Behaghglass	363	Ikerrin	Bourney	Roscrea
Behamore (Hawkshaw)	527	Lower Ormond	Modreeny	Borrisokane
Behamore (Smith)	643	Lower Ormond	Modreeny	Borrisokane
Belleen Lower	182	Lower Ormond	Monsea	Nenagh
Belleen Upper	192	Lower Ormond	Monsea	Nenagh
Belleville	32	Eliogarty	Templemore	Thurles
Bellevue	643	Lower Ormond	Kilbarron	Borrisokane
Bellgrove	130	Lower Ormond	Finnoe	Borrisokane
Bellpark	116	Lower Ormond	Finnoe	Borrisokane
Benamore	186	Ikerrin	Roscrea	Roscrea
Benedin	246	Upper Ormond	Nenagh	Nenagh
Bessborough	24	Upper Ormond	Ballymackey	Nenagh
Bigg's-Lot & Owen's	143	Middlethird	St. Johnbaptist	Cashel
Bigpark	261	Upper Ormond	Latteragh	Nenagh
Birchggrove	185	Kilnamanagh Upper	Doon	Tipperary
Birchggrove	63	Ikerrin	Corbally	Roscrea
Birchhill	277	Kilnamanagh Upper	Templebeg	Thurles
Birdhill	1,956	Owney and Arra	Kilcomenty	Nenagh
Bishopswood	1,053	Kilnamanagh Lower	Kilmore	Cashel
Blackcastle	528	Middlethird	St. Patricksrock	Cashel
Blackcastle	191	Eliogarty	Twomileborris	Thurles
Blackcastle	53	Iffa and Offa East	Inishlounaght	Clonmel
Blackcommon	118	Slievardagh	Kilcooly	Urlingford
Blackcommon	50	Slievardagh	Ballingarry	Callan
Blackfort	245	Lower Ormond	Killodiernan	Nenagh
Blackstairs	207	Kilnamanagh Upper	Toem	Tipperary
Blakefield	528	Upper Ormond	Aghnameadle	Nenagh
Blean	429	Upper Ormond	Aghnameadle	Nenagh
Bleanbeg	381	Owney and Arra	Kilnarath	Nenagh
Bleenaleen Lower	161	Slievardagh	Garrangibbon	Carrick on Suir
Bleenaleen Upper	165	Slievardagh	Garrangibbon	Carrick on Suir
Boggaun	102	Ikerrin	Killavinoge	Roscrea
Boher	442	Owney and Arra	Kilmastulla	Nenagh
Boheravendrum	80	Clanwilliam	Tipperary	Tipperary
Boherboy	1,085	Slievardagh	Kilvemnon	Callan
Boherclogh	14	Middlethird	St. Johnbaptist	Cashel
Bohercrow	828	Clanwilliam	Tipperary	Tipperary
Boherduff	121	Iffa and Offa East	Rathronan	Clonmel
Boherduff	63	Clanwilliam	Cullen	Tipperary
Boherleigh	174	Lower Ormond	Finnoe	Borrisokane
Boherlody	102	Upper Ormond	Dolla	Nenagh
Bohernagore East	59	Iffa and Offa West	Tullaghorton	Clogheen
Bohernagore West	1,321	Iffa and Offa West	Tullaghorton	Clogheen
Bohernamona	162	Eliogarty	Thurles	Thurles
Bohernarnane	1,355	Iffa and Offa West	Tubbrid	Clogheen
Bohernarude	532	Ikerrin	Killea	Roscrea
Bolakeale	291	Slievardagh	Ballingarry	Callan
Bolingbrook	782	Upper Ormond	Kilmore	Nenagh
Bolintlea	1,058	Slievardagh	Ballingarry	Callan
Bonagooga	56	Lower Ormond	Uskane	Borrisokane
Bonagortbaun	179	Ikerrin	Bourney	Roscrea
Bonarea	462	Kilnamanagh Lower	Aghacrew	Tipperary
Boola	376	Ikerrin	Bourney	Roscrea
Boola	163	Ikerrin	Corbally	Roscrea
Boolabane	280	Upper Ormond	Templederry	Nenagh
Boolabaun	742	Ikerrin	Bourney	Roscrea
Boolabeha	535	Eliogarty	Moyne	Thurles
Boolagelagh	66	Lower Ormond	Monsea	Nenagh
Boolagh	179	Middlethird	Kiltinan	Clonmel
Boolaglass	328	Owney and Arra	Youghalarra	Nenagh
Boolahallagh	1,014	Iffa and Offa West	Newcastle	Clogheen
Boolakennedy	1,047	Iffa and Offa West	Shanrahan	Clogheen
Boolakennedy	41	Iffa and Offa West	Tubbrid	Clogheen
Boolanunane	335	Kilnamanagh Upper	Toem	Tipperary
Boolareagh	543	Ikerrin	Bourney	Roscrea
Boolaree	63	Ikerrin	Templetuohy	Thurles
Boolaroe	47	Owney and Arra	Youghalarra	Nenagh
Boolatin	567	Owney and Arra	Killoscully	Nenagh
Booleen	204	Clanwilliam	Templeneiry	Tipperary
Boolteeny	327	Upper Ormond	Kilmore	Nenagh
Boreen	98	Clanwilliam	Solloghod-more	Tipperary
Borheenduff	92	Kilnamanagh Lower	Clogher	Cashel
Borheenduff	17	Iffa and Offa East	St. Mary's, Clonmel	Clonmel
Borris	1,325	Eliogarty	Twomileborris	Thurles
Borris	64	Ikerrin	Roscrea	Roscrea
Borrisbeg	488	Eliogarty	Templemore	Thurles
Borrisland North	47	Kilnamanagh Upper	Glenkeen	Thurles
Borrisland South	92	Kilnamanagh Upper	Glenkeen	Thurles
Borrisnafarney	1,567	Ikerrin	Borrisnafarney	Roscrea
Borrisnoe	1,365	Ikerrin	Bourney	Roscrea
**Borrisokane**	Town	Lower Ormond	Borrisokane	Borrisokane
**Borrisoleigh**	Town	Kilnamanagh Upper	Glenkeen	Thurles
Boscabell	268	Middlethird	St. Patricksrock	Cashel
Boston	96	Lower Ormond	Ballingarry	Borrisokane
Bouladuff	252	Eliogarty	Inch	Thurles
Bounla Islands	10	Lower Ormond	Kilbarron	Borrisokane
Bowling Green	31	Eliogarty	Thurles	Thurles
Boytonrath	991	Middlethird	Boytonrath	Cashel
Breansha	158	Clanwilliam	Emly	Tipperary
Breansha Beg	76	Clanwilliam	Clonpet	Tipperary
Breansha More	231	Clanwilliam	Clonpet	Tipperary
Bredagh	642	Lower Ormond	Lorrha	Borrisokane
Bredagh	283	Upper Ormond	Latteragh	Nenagh
Brenormore	1,892	Iffa and Offa East	Garrangibbon	Carrick on Suir
Brick	185	Iffa and Offa West	Tullaghmelan	Clogheen
Brickendown	507	Middlethird	Brickendown	Cashel
Brieny's Island	2	Lower Ormond	Kilbarron	Borrisokane
Brittas	1,004	Eliogarty	Thurles	Thurles
Brittas	324	Iffa and Offa East	Kilmurry	Carrick on Suir
Brittas	268	Middlethird	St. Patricksrock	Cashel
Brittasroad	141	Eliogarty	Thurles	Thurles
Brockagh	547	Lower Ormond	Kilbarron	Borrisokane
Brockagh	280	Kilnamanagh Lower	Clogher	Cashel
Brodeen	229	Middlethird	Redcity	Cashel
Brodeen	37	Clanwilliam	Corroge	Tipperary
Brookfield	212	Lower Ormond	Kilbarron	Borrisokane
Brookley	80	Eliogarty	Drom	Thurles
Broomhill	50	Slievardagh	Crohane	Callan
Brownbog	50	Kilnamanagh Upper	Toem	Tipperary
Brownstown	428	Eliogarty	Loughmoe East	Thurles
Bruis	177	Clanwilliam	Bruis	Tipperary
Brunswick	87	Iffa and Offa East	Newchapel	Clonmel
Buffanagh	566	Middlethird	Kilconnell	Cashel
Bullockpark	119	Middlethird	Tullamain	Cashel
Bunacum	210	Upper Ormond	Aghnameadle	Nenagh
Bunkimalta	1,441	Owney and Arra	Killoscully	Nenagh
Bunnadober	147	Lower Ormond	Cloghprior	Borrisokane
Buolick	496	Slievardagh	Buolick	Urlingford
Burgagery-lands East	263	Iffa and Offa East	St. Mary's, Clonmel	Clonmel
Burgagery-lands West	592	Iffa and Offa East	St. Mary's, Clonmel	Clonmel
Burges	120	Iffa and Offa West	Whitechurch	Clogheen
Burges Mansion	177	Iffa and Offa West	Tubbrid	Clogheen
Burges New	153	Iffa and Offa West	Tubbrid	Clogheen
Burges West	259	Iffa and Offa West	Tubbrid	Clogheen
Burgesbeg	619	Owney and Arra	Burgesbeg	Nenagh
Burgesland	214	Iffa and Offa West	Molough	Clogheen
Burnchurch	377	Slievardagh	St. Johnbaptist	Cashel
**Burncourt**	Town	Iffa and Offa West	Shanrahan	Clogheen
Burncourt	301	Iffa and Offa West	Shanrahan	Clogheen
Burntwood Big	292	Lower Ormond	Modreeny	Borrisokane
Burntwood Little	120	Lower Ormond	Modreeny	Borrisokane
Butlersfarm	63	Eliogarty	Moycarky	Thurles
Butler's-land	72	Middlethird	Coolmundry	Cashel
Butlerslodge	20	Eliogarty	Templemore	Thurles
Butlerstown	409	Iffa and Offa East	Kilmurry	Carrick on Suir
Butlerstown	109	Iffa and Offa East	Kilsheelan	Clonmel
Byrneskill	137	Middlethird	Coolmundry	Cashel
Cabragh	589	Eliogarty	Fertiana	Thurles
Caddlestown	158	Middlethird	Knockgraffon	Cashel
**Caher**	Town	Iffa and Offa West	Caher	Clogheen
Caherabbey Lower	439	Iffa and Offa West	Caher	Clogheen
Caherabbey Upper	615	Iffa and Offa West	Caher	Clogheen
Caherbaun	334	Middlethird	Kilconnell	Cashel
Caherclogh	614	Iffa and Offa East	Lisronagh	Clonmel
Caherhoereigh	225	Lower Ormond	Loughkeen	Parsonstown
Cahernahallia	827	Kilnamanagh Upper	Toem	Tipperary
Cahervillahowe	513	Clanwilliam	Kilfeakle	Tipperary
Cahervillahowe	171	Clanwilliam	Relickmurry & Athassel	Tipperary
Camea	172	Clanwilliam	Kilfeakle	Tipperary
Cameron (Island)	66	Lower Ormond	Kilbarron	Borrisokane
Camlin	637	Ikerrin	Corbally	Roscrea
Camus	777	Middlethird	St. Patricksrock	Cashel
Camus	246	Middlethird	Ardmayle	Cashel
Cappa	284	Upper Ormond	Ballymackey	Nenagh
Cappaclogh	66	Kilnamanagh Upper	Templebeg	Thurles
Cappadine	139	Owney and Arra	Kilnarath	Nenagh
Cappadrummin	152	Middlethird	Kiltinan	Clonmel
Cappagh	519	Slievardagh	Ballingarry	Callan
Cappagh	460	Kilnamanagh Upper	Toem	Tipperary
Cappagh	54	Slievardagh	Templemichael	Carrick on Suir
Cappagh	48	Kilnamanagh Lower	Donohill	Tipperary
**Cappagh White**	Town	Kilnamanagh Upper	Toem	Tipperary
Cappaghmore	612	Slievardagh	Cloneen	Callan
Cappaghnagarrane	425	Slievardagh	Isertkieran	Callan
Cappaghrattin	170	Clanwilliam	Donohill	Tipperary
Cappakilleen	160	Lower Ormond	Modreeny	Borrisokane
Cappalahan	796	Ikerrin	Bourney	Roscrea
Cappalahan	17	Ikerrin	Corbally	Roscrea
Cappamurragh	388	Kilnamanagh Lower	Clonoulty	Cashel
Cappanakeady	373	Owney and Arra	Kilmastulla	Nenagh
Cappanaleigh	107	Kilnamanagh Upper	Upperchurch	Thurles
Cappanamuck	82	Lower Ormond	Aglishcloghane	Borrisokane
Cappanasmear	454	Lower Ormond	Terryglass	Borrisokane
Cappanavilla	189	Kilnamanagh Upper	Upperchurch	Thurles
Cappanilly	19	Kilnamanagh Upper	Glenkeen	Thurles
Capparoe	288	Upper Ormond	Kilmore	Nenagh
Cappauniac	1,563	Clanwilliam	Clonbullogue	Tipperary
Cappauniac	736	Clanwilliam	Killardry	Tipperary
Cappoge	245	Slievardagh	Kilvemnon	Callan
Carew	131	Kilnamanagh Upper	Upperchurch	Thurles
Carney, Commons of	280	Lower Ormond	Finnoe	Borrisokane
Carneybeg	350	Lower Ormond	Cloghprior	Borrisokane
Carneybrack	123	Lower Ormond	Cloghprior	Borrisokane
Carneycastle	176	Lower Ormond	Cloghprior	Borrisokane
Carneywoodlands	411	Lower Ormond	Cloghprior	Borrisokane
Carragaun	114	Iffa and Offa West	Derrygrath	Clogheen
Carrick	608	Ikerrin	Roscrea	Roscrea
Carrick	161	Lower Ormond	Monsea	Nenagh
Carrick	87	Lower Ormond	Kilbarron	Borrisokane
Carrick	44	Lower Ormond	Ballingarry	Borrisokane
Carrick	3	Upper Ormond	Latteragh	Nenagh
Carrick (Dawson)	154	Upper Ormond	Templedowney	Nenagh
Carrick (Maunsell)	136	Upper Ormond	Templedowney	Nenagh
Carrick (Peacocke)	99	Upper Ormond	Templedowney	Nenagh
**Carrick on Suir**	Town	Iffa and Offa East	Carrick	Carrick on Suir
Carrickaneagh	203	Lower Ormond	Kilruane	Nenagh
Carrickconeen	338	Iffa and Offa East	Inishlounaght	Clonmel
Carrickloughmore	186	Eliogarty	Loughmoe West	Thurles
Carrigagown North	159	Lower Ormond	Kilbarron	Borrisokane
Carrigagown South	137	Lower Ormond	Kilbarron	Borrisokane
Carrigaloe	297	Iffa and Offa East	Kilcash	Clonmel
Carriganagh	637	Clanwilliam	Clonbullogue	Tipperary
Carriganroe	337	Iffa and Offa West	Shanrahan	Clogheen
Carrigataha	291	Iffa and Offa West	Tubbrid	Clogheen
Carrigatogher (Abbott)	447	Owney and Arra	Burgesbeg	Nenagh
Carrigatogher (Harding)	274	Owney and Arra	Burgesbeg	Nenagh
Carrigatogher (Ryan)	356	Owney and Arra	Burgesbeg	Nenagh
Carrigatogher Bog (Abbott)	28	Owney and Arra	Burgesbeg	Nenagh
Carrigatogher Bog (Harding)	11	Owney and Arra	Burgesbeg	Nenagh
Carrigatogher Bog (Ryan)	21	Owney and Arra	Burgesbeg	Nenagh
Carrigawillin	48	Iffa and Offa East	Lisronagh	Clonmel
Carrigeen	323	Middlethird	Knockgraffon	Cashel
Carrigeen	218	Kilnamanagh Lower	Clonoulty	Cashel
Carrigeen	202	Kilnamanagh Upper	Glenkeen	Thurles
Carrigeen	170	Iffa and Offa East	Caher	Clogheen
Carrigeen	157	Eliogarty	Thurles	Thurles
Carrigeen	140	Middlethird	Rathcool	Cashel
Carrigeen	64	Upper Ormond	Lisbunny	Nenagh
Carrigeen	44	Iffa and Offa East	St. Mary's, Clonmel	Clonmel
Carrigeensharragh	291	Middlethird	Baptistgrange	Clonmel
Carriggal	355	Owney and Arra	Burgesbeg	Nenagh
Carrigmadden	301	Owney and Arra	Youghalarra	Nenagh
Carrigmore	354	Iffa and Offa West	Shanrahan	Clogheen
Carrigvisteal	380	Iffa and Offa West	Templetenny	Clogheen
Carrollspark	41	Middlethird	St. Patricksrock	Cashel
Carron	481	Middlethird	St. Johnbaptist	Cashel
Carron	300	Clanwilliam	Tipperary	Tipperary
Carron	98	Clanwilliam	Solloghod-beg	Tipperary
Carrow	1,600	Kilnamanagh Lower	Donohill	Cashel
Carrow	314	Upper Ormond	Kilmore	Nenagh
Carrow	273	Lower Ormond	Monsea	Nenagh
Carrow	183	Middlethird	Ballysheehan	Cashel
Carrow	84	Iffa and Offa West	Ballybacon	Clogheen
Carrowbane	100	Owney and Arra	Youghalarra	Nenagh
Carrowclogh	68	Clanwilliam	Cordangan	Tipperary
Carrowea	68	Upper Ormond	Ballymackey	Nenagh
Carrowkeale	439	Owney and Arra	Kilvellane	Nenagh
Carrowkeale	395	Kilnamanagh Lower	Donohill	Cashel
Carrownaclogh North	73	Owney and Arra	Youghalarra	Nenagh
Carrownaclogh South	3	Owney and Arra	Youghalarra	Nenagh
Carrownaglogh	183	Lower Ormond	Terryglass	Borrisokane
Carrownreddy	297	Clanwilliam	Tipperary	Tipperary
**Cashel**	Town	Middlethird	St. Johnbaptist	Cashel
**Cashel**	Town	Middlethird	St. Patricksrock	Cashel
Cashel	32	Middlethird	St. Johnbaptist	Cashel
Cassestown	506	Eliogarty	Rahelty	Thurles
Castle keale	75	Iffa and Offa West	Ardfinnan	Clogheen
Castleblake	533	Middlethird	Mora	Cashel
Castlecoyne	77	Iffa and Offa West	Mortlestown	Clogheen
Castlecranna	373	Owney and Arra	Kilmastulla	Nenagh
Castlefogarty	403	Kilnamanagh Upper	Ballycahill	Thurles
Castlegrace	540	Iffa and Offa West	Tullaghorton	Clogheen
Castlehiggins	22	Middlethird	Coolmundry	Cashel
Castlehill	203	Kilnamanagh Upper	Glenkeen	Thurles
Castleholding	90	Ikerrin	Roscrea	Roscrea
Castlejohn	364	Slievardagh	Templemichael	Carrick on Suir
Castlelake	402	Middlethird	Relickmurry & Athassel	Cashel
Castleleiny	322	Ikerrin	Templeree	Thurles
Castlelough	601	Owney and Arra	Castletownarra	Nenagh
Castlemoyle North	142	Middlethird	Ardmayle	Cashel
Castlemoyle South	130	Middlethird	Ardmayle	Cashel
Castlepark	214	Clanwilliam	Relickmurry & Athassel	Tipperary
Castlequarter	238	Kilnamanagh Upper	Glenkeen	Thurles
Castlequarter	181	Slievardagh	Killenaule	Cashel
Castlequarter	126	Upper Ormond	Aghnameadle	Nenagh
Castlesheela	123	Lower Ormond	Dromineer	Nenagh
Castletown	730	Eliogarty	Moyne	Thurles
Castletown	529	Owney and Arra	Castletownarra	Nenagh
Castletown	317	Lower Ormond	Kilbarron	Borrisokane
Castletown	99	Lower Ormond	Loughkeen	Parsonstown
Castlewaller	2,425	Owney and Arra	Kilnarath	Nenagh
Cathaganstown	521	Slievardagh	Killenaule	Cashel
Cauteen	148	Clanwilliam	Solloghod-more	Tipperary
Chadville	185	Clanwilliam	Donohill	Tipperary
Chalkhill	174	Upper Ormond	Templederry	Nenagh
Chamberlainstown	294	Middlethird	Outeragh	Cashel
Chancellorsland	231	Clanwilliam	Emly	Tipperary
Chancellorstown Lower	422	Iffa and Offa East	Newchapel	Clonmel
Chancellorstown Upper	314	Iffa and Offa East	Newchapel	Clonmel
Chantersland	216	Clanwilliam	Emly	Tipperary
Charterschool Land	50	Middlethird	St. Johnbaptist & St. Patricksrock	Cashel
Cheesemount	157	Slievardagh	Garrangibbon	Carrick on Suir
Churchfield	108	Clanwilliam	Donohill	Tipperary
Churchquarter	280	Kilnamanagh Upper	Templebeg	Thurles
Clare Beg	73	Middlethird	Kiltinan	Clonmel
Clare More	266	Middlethird	Kiltinan	Clonmel
Clareen	394	Middlethird	Ardmayle	Cashel
Clareen	242	Kilnamanagh Upper	Moyaliff	Thurles
Clareen	169	Owney and Arra	Burgesbeg	Nenagh
Clarkill	231	Lower Ormond	Uskane	Borrisokane
Clash	440	Upper Ormond	Ballymackey	Nenagh
Clashabreeda	77	Owney and Arra	Youghalarra	Nenagh
Clashalaher	139	Middlethird	St. Patricksrock	Cashel
Clashalaher	65	Clanwilliam	Clonpet	Tipperary
Clashaniska Lower	128	Iffa and Offa East	Rathronan	Clonmel
Clashaniska Upper	111	Iffa and Offa East	Rathronan	Clonmel
Clashaniskera	159	Lower Ormond	Modreeny	Borrisokane
Clashanisky	119	Iffa and Offa East	Kilcash	Clonmel
Clashatecaun	56	Lower Ormond	Ardcrony	Nenagh
Clashavaddra	42	Iffa and Offa East	Inishlounaght	Clonmel
Clashavickteery	71	Clanwilliam	Kilshane	Tipperary
Clashavougha	238	Iffa and Offa West	Newcastle	Clogheen
Clashbeg	199	Slievardagh	Modeshil	Callan
Clashdrumsmith	320	Clanwilliam	Emly	Tipperary
Clashduff	462	Slievardagh	Ballingarry	Callan
Clasheleesha	50	Clanwilliam	Emly	Tipperary
Clashganny East	86	Iffa and Offa West	Newcastle	Clogheen
Clashganny West	1,195	Iffa and Offa West	Newcastle	Clogheen
Clashnacrony	125	Kilnamanagh Lower	Donohill	Tipperary
Clashnagraun	76	Upper Ormond	Kilruane	Nenagh
Clashnasmut	437	Slievardagh	Newtownlennan	Carrick on Suir
Clashnevin	380	Upper Ormond	Ballymackey	Nenagh
Clashoquirk	247	Clanwilliam	Templeneiry	Tipperary
Clear's-land	12	Iffa and Offa East	Rathronan	Clonmel
Cleghile	155	Clanwilliam	Kilshane	Tipperary
Clehile	362	Eliogarty	Inch	Thurles
Clerkstown	11	Clanwilliam	Lattin	Tipperary
Clermont	159	Upper Ormond	Kilruane	Borrisokane
Clobanna	243	Eliogarty	Shyane	Thurles
Clocully	282	Iffa and Offa West	Neddans	Clogheen
Coldfields	321	Eliogarty	Twomileborris	Thurles
Cloghabreedy	581	Middlethird	Knockgraffon	Cashel
Cloghanacody	281	Iffa and Offa West	Ardfinnan	Clogheen
Cloghanacody	84	Iffa and Offa West	Derrygrath	Clogheen
Cloghane	266	Eliogarty	Holycross	Thurles
Cloghapistole	112	Iffa and Offa East	Newtownlennan	Carrick on Suir
Clogharaily Beg	264	Eliogarty	Loughmoe East	Thurles
Clogharaily More	605	Eliogarty	Loughmoe East	Thurles
Cloghardeen	257	Iffa and Offa West	Neddans	Clogheen
Cloghardeen	31	Iffa and Offa West	Ardfinnan	Clogheen
Cloghaready	287	Clanwilliam	Templebredon	Tipperary
Cloghateana	364	Middlethird	Magowry	Cashel
Cloghcarrigeen East	2	Iffa and Offa East	Kilsheelan	Clonmel
Cloghcarrigeen West	232	Iffa and Offa East	Kilsheelan	Clonmel
Cloghe	316	Eliogarty	Fertiana	Cashel
**Clogheen**	Town	Iffa and Offa West	Shanrahan	Clogheen
Clogheen Market	320	Iffa and Offa West	Shanrahan	Clogheen
Clogher	455	Kilnamanagh Lower	Clogher	Cashel
Cloghinch	446	Upper Ormond	Templederry	Nenagh
Cloghinch	29	Kilnamanagh Upper	Glenkeen	Thurles
**Cloghjordan**	Town	Lower Ormond	Modreeny	Borrisokane
Cloghjordanpark	432	Lower Ormond	Modreeny	Borrisokane
Cloghkeating	258	Lower Ormond	Modreeny	Borrisokane
Cloghleigh	259	Lower Ormond	Aglishcloghane	Borrisokane
Cloghleigh	62	Owney and Arra	Burgesbeg	Nenagh
Cloghliegh	1,753	Clanwilliam	Relickmurry & Athassel	Tipperary
Cloghmartin	391	Eliogarty	Fertiana	Thurles
Cloghonan	481	Upper Ormond	Templederry	Nenagh
Cloghprior	270	Lower Ormond	Cloghprior	Borrisokane
Clohaskin	254	Lower Ormond	Loughkeen	Parsonstown
Cloheenafishoge	2,077	Iffa and Offa West	Tubbrid	Clogheen
Clohernagh	505	Clanwilliam	Templeneiry	Tipperary
Clon Beg	101	Eliogarty	Inch	Thurles
Clon More	179	Eliogarty	Inch	Thurles
Clonacody	266	Middlethird	Baptistgrange	Cashel
Clonagoose	406	Slievardagh	Kilvemnon	Callan
Clonakenny	811	Ikerrin	Bourney	Roscrea
Clonalea	601	Upper Ormond	Ballymackey	Nenagh
Clonalough	207	Owney and Arra	Killoscully	Nenagh
Clonamicklon	310	Slievardagh	Buolick	Urlingford
Clonamondra	299	Slievardagh	Buolick	Urlingford
Clonamuckoge Beg	194	Eliogarty	Loughmoe East	Thurles
Clonamuckoge More	367	Eliogarty	Loughmoe East	Thurles
Clonaspoe	466	Kilnamanagh Lower	Oughterleague	Cashel
Clonbealy	130	Owney and Arra	Kilvellane	Nenagh
Clonbonnane	234	Clanwilliam	Clonoulty	Tipperary
Clonbrassil	53	Eliogarty	Drom	Thurles
Clonbrick	416	Clanwilliam	Solloghod-more	Tipperary
Clonbrogan	301	Middlethird	Magorban	Cashel
Clonbunny	202	Owney and Arra	Kilvellane	Nenagh
Clonbuogh	682	Ikerrin	Killavinoge	Thurles
Clonbuogh	280	Ikerrin	Templetuohy	Thurles
Cloncannon	1,194	Ikerrin	Borrisnafarney	Roscrea
Cloncorig	195	Lower Ormond	Loughkeen	Parsonstown
Cloncracken	556	Ikerrin	Corbally	Roscrea
Cloncurry	45	Slievardagh	Lismalin	Callan
Clondoty	431	Eliogarty	Loughmoe West	Thurles
Clone	250	Kilnamanagh Lower	Clonoulty	Cashel
Clonedarby	281	Kilnamanagh Lower	Clonoulty	Cashel
Cloneen	495	Ikerrin	Corbally	Roscrea
Clonely	188	Kilnamanagh Lower	Clogher	Cashel
Cloneska	350	Lower Ormond	Aglishcloghane	Borrisokane
Cloneybrien	578	Owney and Arra	Castletownarra	Nenagh
Cloneygowny	115	Owney and Arra	Castletownarra	Nenagh
Clonfinane	446	Lower Ormond	Loughkeen	Parsonstown
Clonfree	174	Lower Ormond	Loughkeen	Parsonstown
Clonganhue	454	Clanwilliam	Solloghod-more	Tipperary
Clongower	276	Eliogarty	Thurles	Thurles
Clongowna	522	Lower Ormond	Dorrha	Parsonstown
Clonismullen	241	Eliogarty	Drom	Thurles
Clonkelly	393	Kilnamanagh Lower	Oughterleague	Cashel
Clonlahy	237	Slievardagh	Kilvemnon	Callan
Clonlusk	68	Clanwilliam	Rathlynin	Tipperary
Clonmaine	178	Clanwilliam	Rathlynin	Tipperary
Clonmakilladuff	259	Lower Ormond	Kilbarron	Borrisokane
**Clonmel**	Town	Iffa and Offa East	St. Mary's, Clonmel	Clonmel
Clonmona	519	Lower Ormond	Dorrha	Parsonstown
Clonmore	1,235	Ikerrin	Killavinoge	Roscrea
Clonmore	95	Iffa and Offa East	Inishlounaght	Clonmel
Clonmore	70	Upper Ormond	Dolla	Nenagh
Clonmore	65	Middlethird	St. Patricksrock	Cashel
Clonmore North	332	Middlethird	Ardmayle	Cashel
Clonmore South	614	Iffa and Offa West	Caher	Clogheen
Clonmore South	396	Iffa and Offa West	Caher	Clogheen
Clonmore South	154	Middlethird	Ardmayle	Cashel
Clonmorewalk	227	Clanwilliam	Templenoe	Tipperary
Clonmurragha	304	Kilnamanagh Upper	Toem	Tipperary
Clonoulty Church quarter	407	Kilnamanagh Lower	Clonoulty	Cashel
Clonoulty Curragh	204	Kilnamanagh Lower	Clonoulty	Cashel
Clonoulty Hill	267	Kilnamanagh Lower	Clonoulty	Cashel
Clonoura	1,596	Slievardagh	Fennor	Urlingford
Clonpet	387	Clanwilliam	Clonpet	Tipperary
Clonraskin	128	Lower Ormond	Loughkeen	Parsonstown
Clonsingle	287	Owney and Arra	Kilvellane	Nenagh
Clontaaffe	462	Ikerrin	Templemore	Roscrea
Clonteige	65	Upper Ormond	Ballymackey	Nenagh
Clonwalsh	263	Iffa and Offa East	Kilgrant	Clonmel
Clonygaheen	189	Owney and Arra	Killoscully	Nenagh
Clonyharp	433	Kilnamanagh Lower	Clogher	Cashel
Clonyharp	42	Kilnamanagh Upper	Moyaliff	Cashel
Cloon	35	Middlethird	Ardmayle	Cashel
Cloon	35	Upper Ormond	Templedowney	Nenagh
Cloonagh	498	Ikerrin	Roscrea	Roscrea
Cloonanagh	220	Upper Ormond	Kilmore	Nenagh
Cloonawillin	209	Lower Ormond	Aglishcloghane	Borrisokane
Clooncleagh	589	Eliogarty	Twomileborris	Thurles
Cloone	267	Eliogarty	Loughmoe East	Thurles
Clooneen Lower	78	Lower Ormond	Kilruane	Nenagh
Clooneen Middle	76	Upper Ormond	Kilruane	Nenagh
Clooneen Upper	242	Upper Ormond	Kilruane	Nenagh
Cloonfinglass	373	Clanwilliam	Killardry	Tipperary
Clooninihy	572	Lower Ormond	Terryglass	Borrisokane
Cloonmalonga	62	Clanwilliam	Kilmucklin	Tipperary
Cloonmanagh	51	Clanwilliam	Cullen	Tipperary
Cloonmore	204	Upper Ormond	Ballymackey	Nenagh
Cloonyhea	213	Middlethird	Drangan	Cashel
Cloonyross (Bolton)	166	Kilnamanagh Lower	Clogher	Cashel
Cloonyross (Percival)	446	Kilnamanagh Lower	Clogher	Cashel
Cloran New	748	Middlethird	Cloneen	Cashel
Cloran Old	735	Middlethird	Cloneen	Cashel
Clybanane	312	Ikerrin	Roscrea	Roscrea
Coalbrook	202	Slievardagh	Ballingarry	Callan
Cobbs	350	Ikerrin	Templeree	Thurles
Coleraine	269	Middlethird	Magorban	Cashel
Collegeland	110	Clanwilliam	Cordangan	Tipperary
Colman (Cramptmore)	970	Middlethird	Colman	Cashel
Colman (Hennessy)	475	Middlethird	Colman	Cashel
Comerford's-lot	55	Clanwilliam	Relickmurry & Athassel	Tipperary
Commanealine	1,112	Kilnamanagh Upper	Doon	Tipperary
Commaun Beg	425	Upper Ormond	Templederry	Nenagh
Commaun More	237	Upper Ormond	Templederry	Nenagh
Commons	535	Eliogarty	Thurles	Thurles
Commons	233	Middlethird	Fethard	Cashel
Commons	17	Iffa and Offa West	Ardfinnan	Clogheen
Commons of Carney	280	Lower Ormond	Finnoe	Borrisokane
Commons-Entire East	75	Iffa and Offa West	Derrygrath	Clogheen
Commons-Entire West	7	Iffa and Offa West	Derrygrath	Clogheen
Controversy	72	Owney and Arra	Killoscully	Nenagh
Cooga	165	Kilnamanagh Upper	Upperchurch	Thurles
Coogulla	312	Eliogarty	Loughmoe East	Thurles
Coolaclamper	171	Iffa and Offa West	Caher	Clogheen
Coolaculla	378	Eliogarty	Rahelty	Thurles
Coolacussane	541	Kilnamanagh Lower	Kilpatrick	Cashel
Cooladerry	434	Iffa and Offa West	Templetenny	Clogheen
Coolagarranroe	3,495	Iffa and Offa West	Templetenny	Clogheen
Coolagh	117	Upper Ormond	Ballynaclogh	Nenagh
Coolagorane Lower	110	Lower Ormond	Ardcrony	Borrisokane
Coolagorane Upper	164	Lower Ormond	Ardcrony	Borrisokane
Coolahholloga	144	Lower Ormond	Nenagh	Nenagh
Coolanga Lower	127	Kilnamanagh Lower	Clonoulty	Cashel
Coolanga Upper	242	Kilnamanagh Lower	Clonoulty	Cashel
Coolantallagh	306	Iffa and Offa West	Shanrahan	Clogheen
Coolanure	374	Middlethird	Rathcool	Cashel
Coolaprevan	772	Iffa and Offa West	Templetenny	Clogheen
Coolarkin	256	Slievardagh	Templemichael	Carrick on Suir
Coolataggle	61	Kilnamanagh Upper	Glenkeen	Thurles
Coolaun	221	Kilnamanagh Upper	Glenkeen	Thurles
Coolbaun	343	Middlethird	Cooleagh	Cashel
Coolbaun	304	Kilnamanagh Lower	Kilpatrick	Cashel
Coolbaun	243	Owney and Arra	Templeachally	Nenagh
Coolbaun	166	Lower Ormond	Kilbarron	Borrisokane
Coolbaun	79	Iffa and Offa West	Tullaghorton	Clogheen
Coolboreen	206	Owney and Arra	Kilnarath	Nenagh
Coolboy	157	Clanwilliam	Emly	Tipperary
Coolcormack	81	Kilnamanagh Upper	Glenkeen	Thurles
Coolcroo	191	Eliogarty	Twomileborris	Thurles
Coolderry	585	Upper Ormond	Ballymackey	Nenagh
Coolderry	318	Lower Ormond	Ardcrony	Nenagh
Coolderry	150	Kilnamanagh Upper	Glenkeen	Thurles
Coolderry	131	Lower Ormond	Modreeny	Borrisokane
Coolderry	108	Lower Ormond	Loughkeen	Parsonstown
Coolderry	52	Owney and Arra	Kilcomenty	Nenagh
Cooldine	302	Slievardagh	Killenaule	Cashel
Cooldotia	29	Kilnamanagh Upper	Ballycahill	Thurles
Cooldrisla	43	Owney and Arra	Kilvellane	Nenagh
Coole	262	Slievardagh	Buolick	Urlingford
Coole	147	Iffa and Offa East	Inishlounaght	Clogheen
Coole	137	Upper Ormond	Aghnameadle	Nenagh
Coole	115	Owney and Arra	Kilnarath	Nenagh
Coole	42	Owney and Arra	Castletownarra	Nenagh
Cooleagh	533	Slievardagh	Graystown	Cashel
Cooleagh	221	Middlethird	Cooleagh	Cashel
Cooleen	542	Upper Ormond	Kilmore	Nenagh
Cooleen	381	Kilnamanagh Upper	Glenkeen	Thurles
Cooleen	376	Owney and Arra	Kilcomenty	Nenagh
Cooleens	69	Iffa and Offa East	St. Mary's, Clonmel	Clonmel
Cooleeny	1,285	Eliogarty	Moyne	Thurles
Cooleshill	144	Ikerrin	Corbally	Roscrea
Coolgarran	41	Ikerrin	Bourney	Roscrea
Coolgarrane	77	Eliogarty	Shyane	Thurles
Coolgort	108	Clanwilliam	Templeneiry	Tipperary
Coolgort	74	Eliogarty	Kilfithmone	Thurles
Coolkennedy	187	Eliogarty	Galbooly	Thurles
Coolkereen	145	Upper Ormond	Aghnameadle	Nenagh
Coolkill	148	Kilnamanagh Upper	Moyaliff	Thurles
Coolkill	60	Kilnamanagh Upper	Ballycahill	Thurles
Coolkip	216	Eliogarty	Moycarky	Thurles
Coolmore	474	Middlethird	Rathcool	Cashel
Coolmoyne	378	Middlethird	Tullamain	Cashel
Coolmoyne (Fennell)	404	Middlethird	Rathcool	Cashel
Coolmoyne (Taylor)	162	Middlethird	Rathcool	Cashel
Coolnacalla	80	Owney and Arra	Kilvellane	Nenagh
Coolnadorny	237	Owney and Arra	Templeachally	Nenagh
Coolnagrower	274	Lower Ormond	Modreeny	Borrisokane
Coolnagun	132	Clanwilliam	Donohill	Tipperary
Coolnagun	95	Clanwilliam	Templenoe	Tipperary
Coolnagun	12	Clanwilliam	Rathlynin	Tipperary
Coolnaherin	99	Clanwilliam	Cordangan	Tipperary
Coolnaherin	59	Clanwilliam	Clonpet	Tipperary
Coolnamoney	193	Kilnamanagh Upper	Moyaliff	Thurles
Coolnamunna	432	Lower Ormond	Modreeny	Borrisokane
Coolnashinnagh	85	Slievardagh	Ballingarry	Callan
Coologe	226	Upper Ormond	Aghnameadle	Nenagh
Coologe	74	Clanwilliam	Templeneiry	Tipperary
Cooloran	148	Iffa and Offa East	Temple-etney	Clonmel
Coolquill	363	Slievardagh	Crohane	Callan
Coolross	1,251	Lower Ormond	Dorrha	Parsonstown
Coolross	153	Owney and Arra	Kilvellane	Nenagh
Coolruntha	542	Owney and Arra	Killoscully	Nenagh
Cooneen	66	Owney and Arra	Castletownarra	Nenagh
Cooneen	66	Upper Ormond	Dolla	Nenagh
Cooneen South	30	Upper Ormond	Dolla	Nenagh
Coonmore	697	Owney and Arra	Abington	Nenagh
Cooper's Lot	199	Middlethird	St. Johnbaptist	Cashel
Coorevin	431	Lower Ormond	Uskane	Borrisokane
Corbally	530	Middlethird	Drangan	Cashel
Corbally	334	Owney and Arra	Castletownarra	Nenagh
Corbally	195	Eliogarty	Rahelty	Thurles
Corbally	106	Kilnamanagh Lower	Clogher	Cashel
Cordangan	680	Clanwilliam	Cordangan	Tipperary
Corderry	546	Clanwilliam	Clonbeg	Tipperary
Cormackstown	1,002	Eliogarty	Holycross	Thurles
Cornalack	70	Lower Ormond	Terryglass	Borrisokane
Cornamult	162	Lower Ormond	Terryglass	Borrisokane
Cornhill	58	Lower Ormond	Loughkeen	Parsonstown
Cornode	193	Owney and Arra	Castletownarra	Nenagh
Corrabella	125	Iffa and Offa West	Neddans	Clogheen
Corraduff	240	Lower Ormond	Loughkeen	Parsonstown
Corralough	62	Middlethird	St. Johnbaptist	Cashel
Corraquill	59	Lower Ormond	Monsea	Nenagh
Corravally	222	Lower Ormond	Ardcrony	Borrisokane
Corriga	278	Ikerrin	Bourney	Roscrea
Corrogebeg	116	Clanwilliam	Kilshane	Tipperary
Corrogemore	327	Clanwilliam	Corroge	Tipperary
Corrowle	265	Lower Ormond	Modreeny	Borrisokane
Corville	568	Ikerrin	Corbally	Roscrea
Cottage	39	Kilnamanagh Upper	Glenkeen	Thurles
Cottage	9	Eliogarty	Inch	Thurles
Coum (Allen)	289	Owney and Arra	Youghalarra	Nenagh
Coum (Parker)	69	Owney and Arra	Youghalarra	Nenagh
Coumbeg	931	Owney and Arra	Youghalarra	Nenagh
Coumbeg	22	Kilnamanagh Upper	Upperchurch	Thurles
Coumnageeha	92	Kilnamanagh Upper	Upperchurch	Thurles
Coumnagillagh	632	Upper Ormond	Dolla	Nenagh
Coumroe	447	Owney and Arra	Youghalarra	Nenagh
Courthill	166	Lower Ormond	Uskane	Borrisokane
Cowbawn	246	Lower Ormond	Modreeny	Borrisokane
Crab	433	Slievardagh	Buolick	Urlingford
Cragg	396	Owney and Arra	Kilcomenty	Nenagh
Craiguedarg	82	Ikerrin	Templemore	Roscrea
Crampscastle	539	Middlethird	Peppardstown	Cashel
Cranagh	664	Ikerrin	Templetuohy	Thurles
Cranahurt	148	Upper Ormond	Kilmore	Nenagh
Cranavaneen	72	Owney and Arra	Kilvellane	Nenagh
Cranna	310	Iffa and Offa West	Tubbrid	Clogheen
Crannagh	271	Lower Ormond	Monsea	Nenagh
Crannagh	144	Iffa and Offa West	Shanrahan	Clogheen
Crannavone	239	Iffa and Offa West	Tubbrid	Clogheen
Creeragh	352	Lower Ormond	Uskane	Borrisokane
Creeragh	92	Lower Ormond	Ballingarry	Borrisokane
Cregg	707	Iffa and Offa East	Newtownlennan	Carrick on Suir
Creggane	106	Owney and Arra	Youghalarra	Nenagh
Croan	196	Slievardagh	Templemichael	Carrick on Suir
Croane	190	Iffa and Offa East	Kilgrant	Clonmel
Croghan	475	Lower Ormond	Loughkeen	Parsonstown
Crohan	1,860	Iffa and Offa East	Newcastle	Clogheen
Crohane Lower	1,530	Slievardagh	Crohane	Callan
Crohane Upper	751	Slievardagh	Crohane	Callan
Cronavone	463	Kilnamanagh Upper	Glenkeen	Thurles
Cronekill	147	Lower Ormond	Loughkeen	Parsonstown
Crossanagh	156	Lower Ormond	Terryglass	Borrisokane
Crossard	54	Middlethird	Barrettsgrange	Cashel
Crossayle	251	Kilnamanagh Lower	Donohill	Tipperary
Crosscannon	89	Slievardagh	Killenaule	Cashel
Crossoge	92	Kilnamanagh Upper	Ballycahill	Thurles
Crossoges	204	Slievardagh	Kilcooly	Urlingford
Crotta	311	Lower Ormond	Borrisokane	Borrisokane
Croughta	114	Iffa and Offa West	Ballybacon	Clogheen
Cruboge	9	Iffa and Offa East	Newchapel	Clonmel
Crumlin Big	704	Ikerrin	Rathnaveoge	Roscrea
Crumlin Little	423	Ikerrin	Rathnaveoge	Roscrea
Crutta North	20	Iffa and Offa West	Derrygrath	Clogheen
Crutta South	49	Iffa and Offa West	Derrygrath	Clogheen
Cuckoobill	140	Iffa and Offa West	Derrygrath	Clogheen
Cullagh	431	Lower Ormond	Dorrha	Parsonstown
Cullahill	1,052	Ikerrin	Bourney	Roscrea
Cullahill	267	Kilnamanagh Upper	Glenkeen	Thurles
Cullaun	414	Ikerrin	Corbally	Roscrea
Culleen	167	Lower Ormond	Dorrha	Parsonstown
Culleenagh	162	Eliogarty	Templemore	Thurles
Cullen	62	Clanwilliam	Cullen	Tipperary
Cullenagh	2,740	Iffa and Offa West	Shanrahan	Clogheen
Cullenagh	227	Owney and Arra	Templeachally	Nenagh
Cullenagh South	333	Iffa and Offa West	Shanrahan	Clogheen
Cumask	64	Kilnamanagh Lower	Oughterleague	Cashel
Cummer	518	Upper Ormond	Templederry	Nenagh
Cummer (Mulloghney)	320	Kilnamanagh Upper	Upperchurch	Thurles
Cummer (Quinlan)	171	Kilnamanagh Upper	Upperchurch	Thurles
Cummer Beg	493	Kilnamanagh Upper	Toem	Tipperary
Cummer More	773	Kilnamanagh Upper	Toem	Tipperary
Cunnaghurt West	105	Upper Ormond	Lisbunny	Nenagh
Cunnahurt East	67	Upper Ormond	Lisbunny	Nenagh
Currabaha	580	Kilnamanagh Upper	Glenkeen	Thurles
Curraduff	175	Ikerrin	Templemore	Roscrea
Curragh	1,684	Iffa and Offa West	Ballybacon	Clogheen
Curragh	476	Owney and Arra	Castletownarra	Nenagh
Curragh	128	Lower Ormond	Uskane	Borrisokane
Curragh	104	Upper Ormond	Latteragh	Nenagh
Curraghadobbin	682	Iffa and Offa East	Kilmurry	Carrick on Suir
Curraghaneety	106	Upper Ormond	Aghnameadle	Nenagh
Curraghanuddy	367	Upper Ormond	Kilnaneave	Nenagh
Curragharneen	394	Upper Ormond	Kilmore	Nenagh
Curraghatoor	340	Iffa and Offa West	Tubbrid	Clogheen
Curraghaviller	254	Owney and Arra	Templeachally	Nenagh
Curraghavoke	631	Clanwilliam	Templeneiry	Tipperary
Curraghbaun	96	Owney and Arra	Youghalarra	Nenagh
Curraghcarroll	68	Kilnamanagh Upper	Glenkeen	Thurles
Curraghcloney	316	Iffa and Offa West	Newcastle	Clogheen
Curraghcloney	218	Iffa and Offa West	Tubbrid	Clogheen
Curraghduff	655	Kilnamanagh Upper	Upperchurch	Thurles
Curraghduff	206	Owney and Arra	Killoscully	Thurles
Curraghfurnisha	46	Kilnamanagh Upper	Glenkeen	Thurles
Curraghglass	1,222	Lower Ormond	Lorrha	Borrisokane
Curraghglass	232	Kilnamanagh Upper	Glenkeen	Thurles
Curraghgraigue	165	Kilnamanagh Upper	Glenkeen	Thurles
Curraghgraigue Lower	106	Upper Ormond	Kilnaneave	Nenagh
Curraghgraigue Upper	184	Upper Ormond	Kilnaneave	Nenagh
Curraghkeal	156	Kilnamanagh Upper	Glenkeen	Thurles
Curraghleigh	146	Kilnamanagh Upper	Glenkeen	Thurles
Curraghleigh	140	Upper Ormond	Dolla	Nenagh
Curraghmarky	1,112	Kilnamanagh Upper	Doon	Tipperary
Curraghmore	1,055	Owney and Arra	Kilmastulla	Nenagh
Curraghmore	321	Lower Ormond	Finnoe	Borrisokane
Curraghmore	320	Lower Ormond	Kilbarron	Borrisokane
Curraghmore	268	Eliogarty	Loughmoe East	Thurles
Curraghnaboola	152	Kilnamanagh Upper	Glenkeen	Thurles
Curraghnamoe	9	Kilnamanagh Upper	Upperchurch	Thurles
Curraghnatinny	158	Kilnamanagh Upper	Moyaliff	Thurles
Curraghpoor	337	Clanwilliam	Rathlynin	Tipperary
Curraghscarteen	405	Middlethird	Rathcool	Cashel
Curraghslagh	79	Iffa and Offa West	Shanrahan	Clogheen
Curraghtarsna	371	Middlethird	Magorban	Cashel
Curraghtemple	121	Owney and Arra	Youghalarra	Nenagh
Curraheen	895	Eliogarty	Ballymurreen	Thurles
Curraheen	636	Kilnamanagh Upper	Toem	Tipperary
Curraheen	576	Slievardagh	Newtownlennan	Carrick on Suir
Curraheen	333	Upper Ormond	Aghnameadle	Nenagh
Curraheen	325	Middlethird	Peppardstown	Cashel
Curraheen	163	Owney and Arra	Killoscully	Nenagh
Curraheen	110	Upper Ormond	Lisbunny	Nenagh
Curraheen	46	Iffa and Offa West	Ballybacon	Clogheen
Curraheenduff	321	Slievardagh	Ballingarry	Callan
Curraleigh East	411	Iffa and Offa West	Templetenny	Clogheen
Curraleigh West	322	Iffa and Offa West	Templetenny	Clogheen
Currasilla Lower	235	Slievardagh	Templemichael	Carrick on Suir
Currasilla Upper	394	Slievardagh	Templemichael	Carrick on Suir
Curreeny	1,558	Upper Ormond	Templederry	Nenagh
Curreeny Commons	1,864	Upper Ormond	Dolla	Nenagh
Currenstown	211	Iffa and Offa East	Inishlounaght	Clonmel
Curryquin	890	Upper Ormond	Kilmore	Nenagh
Curtistown	52	Iffa and Offa East	Kilsheelan	Clonmel
Cushmona	143	Lower Ormond	Dromineer	Nenagh
Dandandargan	422	Clanwilliam	Dangandargan	Tipperary
Dangan	562	Iffa and Offa West	Templetenny	Clogheen
Dangansallagh	330	Ikerrin	Bourney	Roscrea
Dary	291	Lower Ormond	Aglishcloghane	Borrisokane
Dawsonsbog	159	Upper Ormond	Templederry	Nenagh
Deansgrove	252	Middlethird	St. Patricksrock	Cashel
Decoy	70	Iffa and Offa East	Inishlounaght	Clonmel
Deerpark	634	Iffa and Offa East	Carrick	Carrick on Suir
Deerpark	345	Clanwilliam	Shronell	Tipperary
Deerpark	201	Upper Ormond	Kilmore	Nenagh
Deerpark	164	Slievardagh	Kilcooly	Urlingford
Deerpark	152	Middlethird	Horeabbey	Cashel
Deerpark	133	Clanwilliam	Kilfeakle	Tipperary
Deerpark	54	Iffa and Offa East	Inishlounaght	Clogheen
Deerpark Lodge	91	Iffa and Offa East	Carrick	Carrick on Suir
Demesne	71	Ikerrin	Roscrea	Roscrea
Demone	183	Kilnamanagh Lower	Clonoulty	Cashel
Derinlee	149	Lower Ormond	Modreeny	Borrisokane
Derravoher	416	Iffa and Offa West	Tubbrid	Clogheen
Derravoher Lower	16	Iffa and Offa West	Tubbrid	Clogheen
Derreen	88	Lower Ormond	Ballingarry	Borrisokane
Derricknew	643	Slievardagh	Graystown	Cashel
Derries	161	Lower Ormond	Finnoe	Borrisokane
Derrinlieragh	91	Lower Ormond	Loughkeen	Parsonstown
Derrinsallow	217	Lower Ormond	Dorrha	Parsonstown
Derrinvohil	477	Lower Ormond	Uskane	Borrisokane
Derry	904	Lower Ormond	Dorrha	Parsonstown
Derry	82	Eliogarty	Loughmoe East	Thurles
Derry Demesne	421	Owney and Arra	Templeachally	Nenagh
Derrybane	113	Upper Ormond	Ballymackey	Nenagh
Derrybeg	168	Owney and Arra	Templeachally	Nenagh
Derrybreen	334	Lower Ormond	Lorrha	Borrisokane
Derrycallaghan	324	Ikerrin	Cullenwaine	Roscrea
Derrycarney	85	Upper Ormond	Ballymackey	Nenagh
Derrycloney	512	Clanwilliam	Relickmurry & Athassel	Tipperary
Derrycoogh	444	Slievardagh	Buolick	Urlingford
Derryfadda	901	Eliogarty	Moyne	Thurles
Derrygareen	194	Owney and Arra	Kilvellane	Nenagh
Derrygrath Lower	508	Iffa and Offa West	Derrygrath	Clogheen
Derrygrath Upper	109	Iffa and Offa West	Derrygrath	Clogheen
Derryhogan	970	Eliogarty	Twomileborris	Thurles
Derrylahan	100	Ikerrin	Bourney	Roscrea
Derrylaughta	166	Ikerrin	Templetuohy	Thurles
Derryleigh	404	Owney and Arra	Kilvellane	Nenagh
Derryluskan	835	Middlethird	Rathcool	Cashel
Derrymore	1,096	Ikerrin	Corbally	Roscrea
Derrynalsing	198	Lower Ormond	Ardcrony	Borrisokane
Derryvale	43	Ikerrin	Corbally	Roscrea
Derryvella	857	Slievardagh	Kilcooly	Urlingford
Derryville	1,226	Eliogarty	Templetuohy	Thurles
Dogstown	406	Middlethird	Dogstown	Cashel
Dogstown	406	Kilnamanagh Upper	Glenkeen	Thurles
Donaghmore	652	Iffa and Offa East	Donaghmore	Clonmel
Donaskeagh	701	Clanwilliam	Rathlynin	Tipperary
Donegal	462	Middlethird	Knockgraffon	Cashel
Donnybrook	139	Upper Ormond	Ballymackey	Nenagh
Donohill Lands	57	Clanwilliam	Donohill	Tipperary
Doolis	228	Iffa and Offa West	Templetenny	Clogheen
Doon	2,165	Iffa and Offa West	Shanrahan	Clogheen
Doon	193	Iffa and Offa East	Kilgrant	Clonmel
Doonane	341	Owney and Arra	Killoscully	Nenagh
Doonoor	50	Clanwilliam	Templenoe	Tipperary
Doonoor	39	Clanwilliam	Donohill	Tipperary
Dooree Commons	444	Kilnamanagh Upper	Moyaliff	Thurles
Doorish	516	Kilnamanagh Lower	Clonoulty	Cashel
Dorneyswell	64	Iffa and Offa West	Tullaghmelan	Clogheen
Doughill	90	Iffa and Offa West	Tullaghorton	Clogheen
Doughkill	189	Lower Ormond	Loughkeen	Parsonstown
Dovea Lower	674	Eliogarty	Inch	Thurles
Dovea Upper	400	Eliogarty	Inch	Thurles
Downamona	174	Upper Ormond	Kilmore	Nenagh
**Drangan**	Town	Middlethird	Drangan	Cashel
Drangan Beg	440	Clanwilliam	Killardry	Tipperary
Drangan More	430	Clanwilliam	Killardry	Tipperary
Drish	160	Eliogarty	Rahelty	Thurles
Drishane	249	Clanwilliam	Rathlynin	Tipperary
Drishoge	105	Iffa and Offa East	Newchapel	Clonmel
Drom	816	Eliogarty	Drom	Thurles
Dromard Beg	842	Ikerrin	Killavinoge	Roscrea
Dromard More	1,085	Ikerrin	Killavinoge	Roscrea
Dromin	405	Owney and Arra	Burgesbeg	Nenagh
Drominagh	136	Lower Ormond	Terryglass	Borrisokane
Drominagh Demesne	369	Lower Ormond	Terryglass	Borrisokane
Drominagh Wood	137	Lower Ormond	Terryglass	Borrisokane
Dromineer	267	Lower Ormond	Dromineer	Nenagh
Dromline	540	Clanwilliam	Kilfeakle	Tipperary
Dromomarka	353	Clanwilliam	Cordangan	Tipperary
Dromomarka (College)	139	Clanwilliam	Cordangan	Tipperary
Drum	167	Kilnamanagh Lower	Clonoulty	Cashel
Drum	142	Owney and Arra	Castletownarra	Nenagh
Drum	97	Lower Ormond	Aglishcloghane	Borrisokane
Drumbane	1,748	Kilnamanagh Upper	Moyaliff	Thurles
Drumbane	100	Owney and Arra	Templeachally	Nenagh
Drumbaun	251	Owney and Arra	Killoscully	Nenagh
Drumbaun	128	Ikerrin	Cullenwaine	Roscrea
Drumclieve	394	Clanwilliam	Templenoe	Tipperary
Drumcomoge	260	Clanwilliam	Emly	Tipperary
Drumdeel	292	Middlethird	Baptistgrange	Clonmel
Drumdiha	189	Kilnamanagh Upper	Moyaliff	Thurles
Drumgill	175	Kilnamanagh Upper	Glenkeen	Thurles
Drumgower	113	Eliogarty	Moycarky	Thurles
Druminda	130	Kilnamanagh Upper	Toem	Tipperary
Druminure	323	Lower Ormond	Uskane	Borrisokane
Drumleagh	1,344	Clanwilliam	Clonbeg	Tipperary
Drumlummin	502	Iffa and Offa West	Tubbrid	Clogheen
Drummin	180	Lower Ormond	Nenagh	Nenagh
Drummin and Lisdalleen	596	Ikerrin	Templetuohy	Thurles
Drumminacroahy	113	Kilnamanagh Lower	Kilpatrick	Cashel
Drumminacunna	168	Kilnamanagh Lower	Aghacrew	Tipperary
Drumminagower	14	Kilnamanagh Upper	Moyaliff	Thurles
Drumminascart	221	Lower Ormond	Knigh	Nenagh
Drumminnagleagh	106	Kilnamanagh Upper	Ballycahill	Thurles
Drumminphilip	72	Kilnamanagh Upper	Moyaliff	Thurles
Drummonaclara	145	Kilnamanagh Lower	Clonoulty	Cashel
Drummond	140	Lower Ormond	Cloghprior	Borrisokane
Drumnamahane	451	Lower Ormond	Uskane	Borrisokane
Drumnamahane Island	350	Lower Ormond	Uskane	Borrisokane
Drumroe	315	Lower Ormond	Modreeny	Borrisokane
Drumroe	141	Iffa and Offa West	Templetenny	Clogheen
Drumtarsna	139	Kilnamanagh Upper	Glenkeen	Thurles
Drumwood	354	Clanwilliam	Solloghod-more	Tipperary
Drumwood	296	Kilnamanagh Lower	Clogher	Cashel
Dually	319	Middlethird	Ballysheehan	Cashel
Duncummin	551	Clanwilliam	Emly	Tipperary
Dundrum	1,666	Kilnamanagh Lower	Ballintemple	Cashel
Dunguib	195	Slievardagh	Graystown	Cashel
Dunguib	127	Slievardagh	Killenaule	Cashel
Earlshill	277	Slievardagh	Ballingarry	Callan
Eastlone	87	Middlethird	St. Patricksrock	Cashel
Eastwood	225	Eliogarty	Templemore	Thurles
Edenmore	78	Iffa and Offa West	Caher	Clogheen
Elmhill	138	Upper Ormond	Ballymackey	Nenagh
Eminiska	283	Lower Ormond	Modreeny	Borrisokane
Eminiska	68	Lower Ormond	Uskane	Borrisokane
Emlagh	76	Clanwilliam	Kilmucklin	Tipperary
**Emly**	Town	Clanwilliam	Emly	Tipperary
Emly	201	Clanwilliam	Emly	Tipperary
Englishtown	49	Owney and Arra	Templeachally	Nenagh
Erinagh	413	Upper Ormond	Kilmore	Nenagh
Erry	1,034	Middlethird	Erry	Cashel
Esker	109	Owney and Arra	Youghalarra	Nenagh
Eustaceland	40	Iffa and Offa East	Kilsheelan	Clonmel
Everardsgrange	169	Middlethird	Peppardstown	Cashel
Faddan Beg	116	Lower Ormond	Loughkeen	Parsonstown
Faddan More	820	Lower Ormond	Loughkeen	Parsonstown
Faha	63	Owney and Arra	Castletownarra	Nenagh
Falleen	393	Upper Ormond	Ballymackey	Nenagh
Falleeny	189	Upper Ormond	Templederry	Nenagh
Fana	96	Kilnamanagh Lower	Clogher	Cashel
Fanit	315	Owney and Arra	Kilvellane	Nenagh
Fanningsbog	112	Slievardagh	Lismalin	Callan
Fantane North	164	Kilnamanagh Upper	Glenkeen	Thurles
Fantane South	184	Kilnamanagh Upper	Glenkeen	Thurles
Farnamurry	31	Upper Ormond	Nenagh	Nenagh
Farneigh	473	Owney and Arra	Killoscully	Nenagh
Farneybridge	248	Eliogarty	Holycross	Thurles
Farneybridgehill	57	Kilnamanagh Upper	Ballycahill	Thurles
Farramlahassery	105	Iffa and Offa West	Caher	Clogheen
Farran	56	Clanwilliam	Emly	Tipperary
Farranacahill	79	Eliogarty	Templemore	Thurles
Farranaclara	133	Clanwilliam	Kilmucklin	Tipperary
Farranacliff	277	Clanwilliam	Bruis	Tipperary
Farranaderry	172	Eliogarty	Templemore	Thurles
Farranaleen	115	Middlethird	Rathcool	Cashel
Farranamanagh	655	Middlethird	Horeabbey	Cashel
Farranaraheen	48	Clanwilliam	Rathlynin	Tipperary
Farranasa	171	Clanwilliam	Emly	Tipperary
Farranavarra	395	Middlethird	Ballysheehan	Cashel
Farranavulla	127	Kilnamanagh Lower	Ballintemple	Cashel
Farraneshagh	48	Iffa and Offa West	Ardfinnan	Clogheen
Farranjordan	52	Iffa and Offa East	Killaloan	Clonmel
Farrankindry	197	Middlethird	Knockgraffon	Cashel
Farranliney	156	Middlethird	Knockgraffon	Cashel
Farranmacbrien	168	Lower Ormond	Modreeny	Borrisokane
Farrannagark	57	Iffa and Offa West	Caher	Clogheen
Farranreigh	152	Eliogarty	Thurles	Thurles
Farranrory Lower	888	Slievardagh	Ballingarry	Callan
Farranrory Upper	395	Slievardagh	Ballingarry	Callan
Farranshea	277	Middlethird	Peppardstown	Cashel
Fatthen	54	Owney and Arra	Monsea	Nenagh
Fawnagowan	253	Clanwilliam	Cordangan	Tipperary
Fawnlough	380	Upper Ormond	Nenagh	Nenagh
Fee Beg	48	Lower Ormond	Borrisokane	Borrisokane
Fee More	204	Lower Ormond	Borrisokane	Borrisokane
Feemore	63	Iffa and Offa West	Ardfinnan	Clogheen
Fehoonree	23	Middlethird	Rathcool	Cashel
Feigh	424	Lower Ormond	Uskane	Borrisokane
Feigh East	86	Lower Ormond	Aglishcloghane	Borrisokane
Feigh West	46	Lower Ormond	Aglishcloghane	Borrisokane
Fenane	184	Slievardagh	Kilvemnon	Callan
Fennor	1,126	Slievardagh	Fennor	Urlingford
Ferryhouse	47	Iffa and Offa East	Kilgrant	Clonmel
Fertiana	556	Eliogarty	Fertiana	Thurles
**Fethard**	Town	Middlethird	Fethard	Cashel
Fethard	533	Middlethird	Fethard	Cashel
Fiddane	592	Owney and Arra	Kilnarath	Nenagh
Figlash	763	Iffa and Offa East	Kilmurry	Carrick on Suir
Fihertagh	146	Clanwilliam	Templeneiry	Tipperary
Finnahy	827	Kilnamanagh Upper	Upperchurch	Thurles
Firgrove	184	Lower Ormond	Kilbarron	Borrisokane
Firmount	472	Lower Ormond	Terryglass	Borrisokane
Fishmoyne	699	Eliogarty	Kilfithmone	Thurles
Flemingstown	1,347	Iffa and Offa West	Shanrahan	Clogheen
Flemingstown	106	Iffa and Offa West	Tullaghmelan	Clogheen
Flemingstown	95	Iffa and Offa West	Molough	Clogheen
Foilacamin	372	Slievardagh	Buolick	Urlingford
Foilaclug	563	Kilnamanagh Upper	Toem	Tipperary
Foilagoule	228	Kilnamanagh Upper	Moyaliff	Thurles
Foildarg	685	Kilnamanagh Upper	Doon	Tipperary
Foildarragh	511	Owney and Arra	Abington	Nenagh
Foildarrig	121	Owney and Arra	Kilnarath	Nenagh
Foilduff	2,506	Owney and Arra	Abington	Nenagh
Foilduff (Jackson)	1,149	Owney and Arra	Abington	Nenagh
Foilmacduff	591	Kilnamanagh Lower	Donohill	Tipperary
Foilmahonmore	401	Kilnamanagh Upper	Doon	Tipperary
Foilmarnell Lower	110	Slievardagh	Ballingarry	Callan
Foilmarnell Upper	261	Slievardagh	Ballingarry	Callan
Foilnacanony	176	Kilnamanagh Upper	Upperchurch	Nenagh
Foilnaman	347	Kilnamanagh Upper	Upperchurch	Thurles
Foilnamuck	389	Upper Ormond	Dolla	Nenagh
Foilycleary	341	Kilnamanagh Upper	Doon	Tipperary
Forest	199	Eliogarty	Templemore	Thurles
Forgestown	291	Eliogarty	Moycarky	Thurles
Fortmoy	222	Lower Ormond	Aglishcloghane	Borrisokane
Fortyacres	65	Clanwilliam	Cullen	Tipperary
Foulkstown	378	Middlethird	Magorban	Cashel
Foxfort	435	Clanwilliam	Templeneiry	Tipperary
Foxhall	299	Owney and Arra	Kilvellane	Nenagh
Freagh	117	Owney and Arra	Kilnarath	Nenagh
Freaghduff	539	Middlethird	St. Patricksrock	Cashel
Frehans	346	Iffa and Offa West	Ballybacon	Clogheen
Friarsfield	331	Clanwilliam	Templenoe	Tipperary
Friarsgrange	253	Middlethird	Coolmundry	Cashel
Frolick	190	Lower Ormond	Cloghprior	Borrisokane
Furze	137	Eliogarty	Thurles	Thurles
Fussough	108	Middlethird	Ballysheehan	Cashel
Gaile	1,110	Middlethird	Gaile	Cashel
Galbertstown Lower	594	Eliogarty	Fertiana	Thurles
Galbertstown Upper	367	Eliogarty	Fertiana	Thurles
Galbooly	433	Eliogarty	Galbooly	Thurles
Galbooly Little	245	Eliogarty	Galbooly	Thurles
Gammonsfield	22	Iffa and Offa East	Kilsheelan	Clonmel
Garane	293	Upper Ormond	Aghnameadle	Nenagh
Garnavilla	849	Iffa and Offa West	Caher	Clogheen
Garnavilla	30	Iffa and Offa West	Derrygrath	Clogheen
Garracummer	958	Kilnamanagh Upper	Doon	Tipperary
Garranacanty	444	Clanwilliam	Corroge	Tipperary
Garranacleary	80	Lower Ormond	Cloghprior	Borrisokane
Garranacool	630	Slievardagh	Ballingarry	Callan
Garranakeevin	52	Owney and Arra	Youghalarra	Nenagh
Garranakilka	294	Kilnamanagh Upper	Upperchurch	Thurles
Garranashingaun	51	Owney and Arra	Castletownarra	Nenagh
Garranbeg	174	Slievardagh	Garrangibbon	Carrick on Suir
Garrancasey	118	Iffa and Offa West	Molough	Clogheen
Garrandee	152	Middlethird	Knockgraffon	Tipperary
Garrandillon	477	Iffa and Offa West	Shanrahan	Clogheen
Garrane	495	Upper Ormond	Templedowney	Nenagh
Garrane	363	Clanwilliam	Ballygriffin	Tipperary
Garrane	171	Upper Ormond	Latteragh	Nenagh
Garrane	160	Kilnamanagh Upper	Glenkeen	Thurles
Garrane	158	Lower Ormond	Kilbarron	Borrisokane
Garrane	98	Lower Ormond	Ballingarry	Borrisokane
Garrane	73	Slievardagh	Killenaule	Cashel
Garrane	51	Upper Ormond	Templederry	Nenagh
Garrangibbon	132	Slievardagh	Garrangibbon	Carrick on Suir
Garrangrena Lower	412	Kilnamanagh Upper	Glenkeen	Thurles
Garrangrena Upper	202	Kilnamanagh Upper	Glenkeen	Thurles
Garrankyle	210	Middlethird	Cloneen	Cashel
Garranlea	594	Middlethird	Knockgraffon	Cashel
Garranmore	368	Middlethird	St. Patricksrock	Cashel
Garranmore	264	Kilnamanagh Lower	Clogher	Cashel
Garranmore	225	Owney and Arra	Youghalarra	Nenagh
Garranroe	415	Eliogarty	Rahelty	Thurles
Garransilly	321	Slievardagh	Kilcooly	Urlingford
Garranthurles	51	Upper Ormond	Ballymackey	Nenagh
Garraun	675	Owney and Arra	Kilnarath	Nenagh
Garraun	673	Middlethird	Ballysheehan	Cashel
Garraun	564	Eliogarty	Twomileborris	Thurles
Garraun	343	Middlethird	Mora	Cashel
Garraun	298	Lower Ormond	Modreeny	Borrisokane
Garraun	183	Middlethird	St. Patricksrock	Cashel
Garraunanearla	84	Lower Ormond	Knigh	Nenagh
Garraunbeg	406	Owney and Arra	Killoscully	Nenagh
Garraunfadda	324	Lower Ormond	Monsea	Nenagh
Garraunorish	125	Lower Ormond	Modreeny	Borrisokane
Garravally	108	Upper Ormond	Ballymackey	Nenagh
Garrinch	152	Middlethird	Fethard	Cashel
Garryandrew North	76	Middlethird	St. Patricksrock	Cashel
Garryandrew South	23	Middlethird	St. Patricksrock	Cashel
Garryard	325	Lower Ormond	Terryglass	Borrisokane
Garryard	89	Middlethird	St. Patricksrock	Cashel
Garryard East	102	Upper Ormond	Kilmore	Nenagh
Garryard West	333	Upper Ormond	Kilmore	Nenagh
Garrybaun	57	Lower Ormond	Aglishcloghane	Borrisokane
Garryclogh	323	Slievardagh	Fennor	Urlingford
Garryclogher	89	Upper Ormond	Kilmore	Nenagh
Garrycloher	238	Iffa and Offa West	Caher	Clogheen
Garryclohy	114	Lower Ormond	Terryglass	Borrisokane
Garryduff	999	Iffa and Offa West	Newcastle	Clogheen
Garryduff	536	Iffa and Offa East	Garrangibbon	Carrick on Suir
Garryduff	268	Clanwilliam	Clonpet	Tipperary
Garryduff	231	Iffa and Offa West	Ballybacon	Clogheen
Garryduff	73	Lower Ormond	Dromineer	Nenagh
Garryduff East	186	Kilnamanagh Lower	Ballintemple	Cashel
Garryduff West	56	Kilnamanagh Lower	Ballintemple	Cashel
Garryglass	774	Upper Ormond	Kilnaneave	Nenagh
Garryheakin	147	Clanwilliam	Cullen	Tipperary
Garrykennedy	598	Owney and Arra	Castletownarra	Nenagh
Garrymacteige	48	Owney and Arra	Castletownarra	Nenagh
Garrymore	331	Iffa and Offa West	Tullaghorton	Clogheen
Garrymore	58	Upper Ormond	Kilmore	Nenagh
Garrymorris	210	Slievardagh	Garrangibbon	Carrick on Suir
Garrynafana	363	Upper Ormond	Ballymackey	Nenagh
Garrynagree	273	Slievardagh	Ballingarry	Callan
Garrynamona	579	Eliogarty	Ballycahill	Thurles
Garrynatineel	392	Owney and Arra	Templeachally	Nenagh
Garryncurry	176	Lower Ormond	Kilbarron	Borrisokane
Garryndrihid	12	Iffa and Offa East	Newchapel	Clonmel
Garrynoe	365	Slievardagh	Mowney	Callan
Garryntemple	294	Iffa and Offa East	Inishlounaght	Clonmel
Garryroan	448	Iffa and Offa West	Whitechurch	Clogheen
Garryroe	185	Iffa and Offa West	Ballybacon	Clogheen
Garryroe	112	Iffa and Offa West	Derrygrath	Clogheen
Garryroe	61	Iffa and Offa East	Kiltegan	Clonmel
Garrysallagh	101	Slievardagh	Crohane	Callan
Garryshane	145	Clanwilliam	Donohill	Tipperary
Garryshane	52	Iffa and Offa East	Inishlounaght	Clonmel
Garryskillane	25	Clanwilliam	Cordangan	Tipperary
Garryteige	299	Owney and Arra	Kilvellane	Nenagh
Garryvanus	167	Kilnamanagh Upper	Ballycahill	Thurles
Garryvicleheen	117	Eliogarty	Thurles	Thurles
Gatterstown	214	Kilnamanagh Lower	Clogher	Cashel
Gaulross	362	Lower Ormond	Borrisokane	Borrisokane
George's Land	104	Middlethird	St. Patricksrock	Cashel
Giantsgrave	256	Iffa and Offa East	Rathronan	Clonmel
Glascloyne	21	Middlethird	Ballysheehan	Cashel
Glassdrum	593	Kilnamanagh Lower	Donohill	Tipperary
Glastrigan	525	Upper Ormond	Templederry	Nenagh
Glebe	73	Ikerrin	Killavinoge	Roscrea
Glebe	65	Eliogarty	Thurles	Thurles
Glebe	64	Kilnamanagh Upper	Moyaliff	Thurles
Glebe	57	Kilnamanagh Lower	Aghacrew	Tipperary
Glebe	36	Lower Ormond	Killodiernan	Nenagh
Glebe	33	Clanwilliam	Kilmucklin	Tipperary
Glebe	27	Clanwilliam	Killardry	Tipperary
Glebe	7	Ikerrin	Roscrea	Roscrea
Glenacre	66	Owney and Arra	Templeachally	Nenagh
Glenacunna	1,393	Iffa and Offa West	Templetenny	Clogheen
Glenacunna	165	Slievardagh	Garrangibbon	Carrick on Suir
Glenaguile	522	Upper Ormond	Aghnameadle	Nenagh
Glenaguile	322	Upper Ormond	Latteragh	Nenagh
Glenahilty	527	Upper Ormond	Ballygibbon	Nenagh
Glenalemy	48	Iffa and Offa East	Kilgrant	Clonmel
Glenaviegh	61	Lower Ormond	Kilbarron	Borrisokane
Glenawinna	126	Upper Ormond	Aghnameadle	Nenagh
Glenbane	943	Clanwilliam	Glenbane	Tipperary
Glenbane Lower	832	Middlethird	Holycross	Cashel
Glenbane Upper	395	Middlethird	Holycross	Cashel
Glenbeg	181	Kilnamanagh Upper	Upperchurch	Thurles
Glenbeha	188	Ikerrin	Corbally	Roscrea
Glenbower	139	Lower Ormond	Kilbarron	Borrisokane
Glenbreedy	577	Kilnamanagh Upper	Glenkeen	Thurles
Glencallaghan	131	Iffa and Offa West	Shanrahan	Clogheen
Glencarbry	223	Kilnamanagh Lower	Donohill	Tipperary
Glenconnor	148	Iffa and Offa East	Kiltegan	Clonmel
Glencoshabinnia	1,552	Clanwilliam	Clonbeg	Tipperary
Glencroe	251	Owney and Arra	Kilnarath	Nenagh
Glencrue	64	Owney and Arra	Castletownarra	Nenagh
Glenduff	162	Upper Ormond	Dolla	Nenagh
Glenfinshinagh	94	Kilnamanagh Upper	Upperchurch	Thurles
Glengaddy	128	Middlethird	Barrettsgrange	Cashel
Glengall	661	Slievardagh	Ballingarry	Callan
Glengar	788	Kilnamanagh Upper	Doon	Tipperary
Glengarra	1,029	Iffa and Offa West	Shanrahan	Clogheen
Glengarriff	114	Eliogarty	Thurles	Thurles
Glengoole North	809	Slievardagh	Kilcooly	Urlingford
Glengoole South	714	Slievardagh	Kilcooly	Urlingford
Gleninchnaveigh	113	Kilnamanagh Upper	Upperchurch	Thurles
Glenkeen	266	Kilnamanagh Upper	Glenkeen	Thurles
Glenmore Lower	188	Upper Ormond	Latteragh	Nenagh
Glenmore Upper	426	Upper Ormond	Latteragh	Nenagh
Glennaclohalea	62	Iffa and Offa West	Ardfinnan	Clogheen
Glennagat	351	Middlethird	Knockgraffon	Cashel
Glennanoge	104	Kilnamanagh Upper	Glenkeen	Thurles
Glennariesk	55	Kilnamanagh Upper	Glenkeen	Thurles
Glennaskagh	1,218	Slievardagh	Grangemockler	Carrick on Suir
Glennaslaud	62	Middlethird	Kilbragh	Cashel
Glenough Lower	2,354	Kilnamanagh Lower	Clonoulty	Cashel
Glenough Upper	722	Kilnamanagh Lower	Clonoulty	Cashel
Glenpaudeen	845	Kilnamanagh Lower	Donohill	Tipperary
Glenreagh	208	Ikerrin	Killea	Roscrea
Glenreagh Beg	227	Eliogarty	Holycross	Thurles
Glenreagh More	241	Eliogarty	Holycross	Thurles
Glentane	372	Kilnamanagh Upper	Glenkeen	Thurles
Glentara	57	Ikerrin	Roscrea	Roscrea
Goat Island	1	Lower Ormond	Kilbarron	Borrisokane
**Goatstown**	Town	Lower Ormond	Borrisokane	Borrisokane
**Golden**	Town	Clanwilliam	Relickmurry & Athassel	Tipperary
Goldengarden	330	Kilnamanagh Lower	Kilpatrick	Cashel
Goldengrove	101	Eliogarty	Inch	Thurles
Goldenhills	108	Clanwilliam	Relickmurry & Athassel	Tipperary
Gormanstown	334	Iffa and Offa West	Ballybacon	Clogheen
Gortaclivore	49	Clanwilliam	Clonbeg	Tipperary
Gortacoula	128	Owney and Arra	Kilnarath	Nenagh
Gortacullin	1,551	Iffa and Offa West	Ballybacon	Clogheen
Gortaculrush	189	Kilnamanagh Lower	Clogher	Cashel
Gortacurra	287	Ikerrin	Killea	Roscrea
Gortadalaun	244	Lower Ormond	Ardcrony	Nenagh
Gortaderry	75	Kilnamanagh Upper	Toem	Tipperary
Gortagarry	671	Upper Ormond	Aghnameadle	Nenagh
Gortagea	16	Middlethird	Fethard	Cashel
Gortagowlane	43	Clanwilliam	Clonpet	Tipperary
Gortahoola	258	Kilnamanagh Upper	Moyaliff	Thurles
Gortahumma	615	Upper Ormond	Kilnaneave	Nenagh
Gortakilleen	96	Clanwilliam	Cullen	Tipperary
Gortaknockeare	527	Clanwilliam	Cordangan	Tipperary
Gortalough	150	Kilnamanagh Upper	Glenkeen	Thurles
Gortanassy East	62	Slievardagh	Crohane	Callan
Gortanassy West	160	Slievardagh	Crohane	Callan
Gortanerrig	181	Clanwilliam	Solloghod-beg	Tipperary
Gortaniddan	143	Kilnamanagh Upper	Glenkeen	Thurles
Gortanoura	82	Lower Ormond	Monsea	Nenagh
Gortard	204	Kilnamanagh Lower	Donohill	Cashel
Gortarush Lower	836	Kilnamanagh Lower	Ballintemple	Cashel
Gortarush Upper	158	Kilnamanagh Lower	Ballintemple	Cashel
Gortataggart	108	Eliogarty	Thurles	Thurles
Gortatemple	28	Clanwilliam	Emly	Tipperary
Gortatooda	126	Kilnamanagh Upper	Upperchurch	Thurles
Gortavalla	183	Lower Ormond	Modreeny	Borrisokane
Gortavalla	11	Clanwilliam	Cordangan	Tipperary
Gortavoher East	510	Clanwilliam	Clonbeg	Tipperary
Gortavoher West	805	Clanwilliam	Clonbeg	Tipperary
Gortawoer	12	Lower Ormond	Ardcrony	Nenagh
Gortbrack	46	Iffa and Offa East	Kilsheelan	Clonmel
Gortderryboy	242	Ikerrin	Bourney	Roscrea
Gortdrum	198	Clanwilliam	Solloghod-more	Tipperary
Gorteen	386	Ikerrin	Bourney	Roscrea
Gorteen	267	Lower Ormond	Finnoe	Borrisokane
Gorteen	234	Clanwilliam	Emly	Tipperary
Gorteen	139	Clanwilliam	Rathlynin	Tipperary
Gorteen Lower	218	Slievardagh	Buolick	Urlingford
Gorteen North	26	Clanwilliam	Donohill	Tipperary
Gorteen South	10	Clanwilliam	Donohill	Tipperary
Gorteen Upper	242	Slievardagh	Buolick	Urlingford
Gorteenadiha	406	Upper Ormond	Kilmore	Nenagh
Gorteenadiha	30	Kilnamanagh Upper	Templebeg	Thurles
Gorteenaphooka	50	Clanwilliam	Donohill	Tipperary
Gorteenaphoria	167	Kilnamanagh Upper	Moyaliff	Thurles
Gorteenashingaun	458	Ikerrin	Rathnaveoge	Roscrea
Gorteenavalla	163	Upper Ormond	Templederry	Nenagh
Gorteendangan	173	Ikerrin	Templeree	Thurles
Gorteenduvane	138	Clanwilliam	Donohill	Tipperary
Gorteenmagher	222	Ikerrin	Templeree	Thurles
Gorteennabarna	155	Kilnamanagh Upper	Glenkeen	Thurles
Gorteennakilla	312	Owney and Arra	Monsea	Nenagh
Gorteennamona	430	Kilnamanagh Lower	Clonoulty	Cashel
Gorteenraineer	149	Slievardagh	Buolick	Urlingford
Gorteenshamrogue	99	Middlethird	Rathcool	Cashel
Gorteeny	199	Kilnamanagh Upper	Glenkeen	Thurles
Gorteeshal	1,176	Iffa and Offa West	Templetenny	Clogheen
Gortfree	299	Slievardagh	Ballingarry	Callan
Gortinarable	208	Lower Ormond	Ballingarry	Borrisokane
Gortkelly	438	Kilnamanagh Upper	Upperchurch	Thurles
Gortknock	55	Slievardagh	Templemichael	Carrick on Suir
Gortlandroe	218	Lower Ormond	Nenagh	Nenagh
Gortlassabrien	992	Owney and Arra	Templeachally	Nenagh
Gortmahonoge	427	Kilnamanagh Upper	Toem	Tipperary
Gortmakellis	357	Middlethird	St. Patricksrock	Cashel
Gortmaloge	67	Iffa and Offa East	St. Mary's, Clonmel	Clonmel
Gortmore	891	Owney and Arra	Burgesbeg	Nenagh
Gortmore	222	Lower Ormond	Terryglass	Borrisokane
Gortmore	43	Iffa and Offa East	Inishlounaght	Clonmel
Gortmullin	304	Ikerrin	Corbally	Roscrea
Gortmunga	94	Lower Ormond	Kilbarron	Borrisokane
Gortnabarnan	141	Clanwilliam	Cullen	Tipperary
Gortnaboley	80	Kilnamanagh Upper	Glenkeen	Thurles
Gortnacally	135	Ikerrin	Bourney	Roscrea
Gortnacally	44	Ikerrin	Corbally	Roscrea
Gortnacleha	132	Upper Ormond	Kilmore	Nenagh
Gortnaclogh	34	Middlethird	Ardmayle	Cashel
Gortnacoolagh	179	Clanwilliam	Donohill	Tipperary
Gortnacran Beg	36	Kilnamanagh Upper	Glenkeen	Thurles
Gortnacran More	170	Kilnamanagh Upper	Glenkeen	Thurles
Gortnada	67	Kilnamanagh Upper	Upperchurch	Thurles
Gortnadrumman	164	Upper Ormond	Ballymackey	Nenagh
Gortnadumagh	186	Ikerrin	Bourney	Roscrea
Gortnafurra	171	Clanwilliam	Clonbeg	Tipperary
Gortnaglogh	225	Eliogarty	Thurles	Thurles
Gortnagowna	881	Ikerrin	Killavinoge	Roscrea
Gortnagowna	581	Upper Ormond	Templederry	Nenagh
Gortnagrann	335	Lower Ormond	Aglishcloghane	Borrisokane
Gortnagranna	76	Kilnamanagh Lower	Clonoulty	Cashel
Gortnahaha	72	Eliogarty	Loughmoe East	Thurles
Gortnahahaboy	19	Clanwilliam	Donohill	Tipperary
Gortnahalla	354	Kilnamanagh Upper	Upperchurch	Thurles
**Gortnahoo**	Town	Slievardagh	Buolick	Urlingford
Gortnahoo	652	Slievardagh	Buolick	Urlingford
Gortnahulla	51	Lower Ormond	Aglishcloghane	Borrisokane
Gortnalara	160	Upper Ormond	Templederry	Nenagh
Gortnalower	12	Iffa and Offa West	Ardfinnan	Clogheen
Gortnasculloge	178	Slievardagh	Ballingarry	Callan
Gortnaskehy	416	Owney and Arra	Kilmastulla	Nenagh
Gortnaskehy	298	Kilnamanagh Lower	Clogher	Cashel
Gortnaskehy	288	Ikerrin	Bourney	Roscrea
Gortnaskehy	257	Owney and Arra	Kilnarath	Nenagh
Gortnaskehy	225	Kilnamanagh Upper	Upperchurch	Thurles
Gortnasmuttaun	104	Slievardagh	Ballingarry	Callan
Gortnavarnoge	141	Owney and Arra	Kilcomenty	Nenagh
Gortnaveigh	60	Owney and Arra	Youghalarra	Nenagh
Gortolee	27	Owney and Arra	Killoscully	Nenagh
Gortreagh	205	Eliogarty	Loughmoe East	Thurles
Gortshane East	183	Owney and Arra	Kilnarath	Nenagh
Gortshane Middle	230	Owney and Arra	Kilnarath	Nenagh
Gortshane West	192	Owney and Arra	Kilnarath	Nenagh
Gortshaneroe	537	Upper Ormond	Kilmore	Nenagh
Gortussa	554	Kilnamanagh Lower	Ballintemple	Cashel
Gortussa	323	Kilnamanagh Lower	Kilpatrick	Cashel
Gortvunatrime	87	Clanwilliam	Emly	Tipperary
Gortybrigane	298	Owney and Arra	Kilcomenty	Nenagh
Gortycullane	138	Owney and Arra	Burgesbeg	Nenagh
Gortyogan	92	Lower Ormond	Monsea	Nenagh
Gotinstown	527	Clanwilliam	Solloghod-more	Tipperary
Goulmore	538	Owney and Arra	Abington	Nenagh
Goulreagh	241	Owney and Arra	Killoscully	Nenagh
Graceland	27	Kilnamanagh Upper	Templebeg	Thurles
Graffin	818	Ikerrin	Killavinoge	Roscrea
Graffin	119	Kilnamanagh Lower	Kilpatrick	Cashel
Graffin	104	Kilnamanagh Lower	Donohill	Cashel
Gragaugh	754	Slievardagh	Lismalin	Callan
Graigaheesha	496	Slievardagh	Kilcooly	Urlingford
Graigaman	480	Slievardagh	Buolick	Urlingford
Graigillane	104	Lower Ormond	Finnoe	Borrisokane
Graigue	970	Eliogarty	Moycarky	Thurles
Graigue	881	Iffa and Offa East	Tullaghorton	Clogheen
Graigue	648	Iffa and Offa East	Temple-etney	Clonmel
Graigue	577	Middlethird	Mora	Cashel
Graigue	455	Iffa and Offa East	Ballybacon	Clogheen
Graigue	408	Middlethird	Knockgraffon	Cashel
Graigue	402	Iffa and Offa East	Newchapel	Clonmel
Graigue	375	Upper Ormond	Ballygibbon	Borrisokane
Graigue	242	Lower Ormond	Dorrha	Parsonstown
Graigue	224	Slievardagh	Modeshil	Callan
Graigue	221	Eliogarty	Drom	Thurles
Graigue	145	Lower Ormond	Kilruane	Borrisokane
Graigue Little	28	Middlethird	Knockgraffon	Cashel
Graigue Lower	586	Slievardagh	Killenaule	Cashel
Graigue Lower	255	Lower Ormond	Ardcrony	Borrisokane
Graigue Upper	200	Slievardagh	Killenaule	Cashel
Graigue Upper	169	Lower Ormond	Ardcrony	Borrisokane
Graiguebeg	37	Ikerrin	Templemore	Roscrea
Graiguefrahane	497	Eliogarty	Loughmoe East	Thurles
Graiguenoe	588	Middlethird	Holycross	Cashel
Graiguepadeen	1,115	Slievardagh	Fennor	Urlingford
Grallagh	908	Middlethird	Graystown	Cashel
Grallagh	313	Lower Ormond	Monsea	Nenagh
Grallagh	135	Clanwilliam	Clonbullogue	Tipperary
Grallagh	77	Upper Ormond	Dolla	Nenagh
Grange	493	Lower Ormond	Lorrha	Borrisokane
Grange	371	Eliogarty	Holycross	Thurles
Grange	360	Owney and Arra	Templeachally	Nenagh
Grange	248	Eliogarty	Thurles	Thurles
Grange	199	Clanwilliam	Donohill	Tipperary
Grange	164	Ikerrin	Corbally	Roscrea
Grange Beg	166	Middlethird	Erry	Cashel
Grange Beg	61	Iffa and Offa West	Caher	Clogheen
Grange Lower	166	Lower Ormond	Knigh	Nenagh
Grange More	342	Middlethird	Erry	Cashel
Grange More	105	Iffa and Offa West	Caher	Clogheen
Grange North	107	Clanwilliam	Relickmurry & Athassel	Tipperary
Grange South	154	Clanwilliam	Relickmurry & Athassel	Tipperary
Grange Upper	202	Lower Ormond	Knigh	Nenagh
Grangebarry	161	Middlethird	Cooleagh	Cashel
Grangebeg	469	Middlethird	Kiltinan	Clonmel
Grangecastle	214	Slievardagh	Kilcooly	Urlingford
Grangecrag	138	Slievardagh	Kilcooly	Urlingford
Grangeduff	37	Middlethird	Rathcool	Cashel
Grangehill	208	Slievardagh	Kilcooly	Urlingford
Grangelough	105	Kilnamanagh Upper	Glenkeen	Thurles
Grangemockler	899	Slievardagh	Grangemockler	Carrick on Suir
Grangeroe	109	Kilnamanagh Upper	Glenkeen	Thurles
Graniera	688	Kilnamanagh Upper	Upperchurch	Thurles
Grantstown	784	Clanwilliam	Kilfeakle	Tipperary
Graystown	588	Slievardagh	Graystown	Cashel
Green	19	Middlethird	St. Johnbaptist	Cashel
Greenan	305	Upper Ormond	Templederry	Nenagh
Greenane	233	Clanwilliam	Templenoe	Tipperary
Greenfield	382	Kilnamanagh Lower	Donohill	Tipperary
Greenhall	271	Owney and Arra	Killoscully	Nenagh
Greenhills	204	Ikerrin	Cullenwaine	Roscrea
Greenhills	197	Owney and Arra	Kilmastulla	Nenagh
Greenlane	259	Lower Ormond	Finnoe	Borrisokane
Greenmount	268	Iffa and Offa West	Molough	Clogheen
Greenrath	196	Clanwilliam	Tipperary	Tipperary
Greensland	37	Iffa and Offa East	Kilsheelan	Clonmel
Greenwood	40	Eliogarty	Templemore	Thurles
Grenanstown	655	Upper Ormond	Ballymackey	Nenagh
Grenanstown	284	Upper Ormond	Kilkeary	Nenagh
Greyfort	234	Lower Ormond	Borrisokane	Borrisokane
Grousehall	468	Kilnamanagh Upper	Upperchurch	Thurles
Grove	219	Middlethird	Fethard	Cashel
Gurteen	549	Lower Ormond	Dorrha	Parsonstown
Gurteen	414	Lower Ormond	Loughkeen	Borrisokane
Gurteen	312	Lower Ormond	Ballingarry	Borrisokane
Gurteen	71	Upper Ormond	Latteragh	Nenagh
Gurteen (Bryan)	207	Slievardagh	Kilvemnon	Callan
Gurteen (Pennefather)	459	Slievardagh	Kilvemnon	Callan
Gurtnafleur	71	Iffa and Offa East	Kilgrant	Clonmel
Gurtnapisha	667	Middlethird	Cloneen	Cashel
Hardbog	205	Slievardagh	Templemichael	Carrick on Suir
Harleypark	317	Slievardagh	Ballingarry	Callan
Harleypark	57	Slievardagh	Lismalin	Callan
Hayes' Island	9	Lower Ormond	Lorrha	Borrisokane
Haywood	68	Iffa and Offa East	St. Mary's, Clonmel	Clonmel
Haywood	13	Iffa and Offa East	Rathronan	Clonmel
Heathview	244	Slievardagh	Garrangibbon	Carrick on Suir
Higginstown	294	Middlethird	Peppardstown	Cashel
Hill's-lot	401	Middlethird	St. Johnbaptist	Cashel
Hilton	125	Lower Ormond	Modreeny	Borrisokane
**Holycross**	Town	Middlethird	Holycross	Cashel
**Holycross**	Town	Eliogarty	Holycross	Thurles
Holycross	641	Eliogarty	Holycross	Thurles
Honeymount	281	Ikerrin	Rathnaveoge	Roscrea
Hoops-lot	45	Clanwilliam	Relickmurry & Athassel	Tipperary
Hopkinsrea	460	Iffa and Offa West	Shanrahan	Clogheen
Horeabbey	379	Middlethird	Horeabbey	Cashel
Horsepasture	129	Iffa and Offa East	Kilgrant	Clonmel
Hughes'-lot East	413	Middlethird	St. Johnbaptist	Cashel
Hughes'-West	40	Middlethird	St. Johnbaptist	Cashel
Husseystown	188	Iffa and Offa West	Caher	Clogheen
Hymenstown	498	Clanwilliam	Relickmurry & Athassel	Tipperary
Illananummera	31	Eliogarty	Inch	Thurles
Illaunmeen	142	Clanwilliam	Cullen	Tipperary
Inane	507	Ikerrin	Roscrea	Roscrea
Inch	199	Eliogarty	Inch	Thurles
Incha Beg	126	Owney and Arra	Templeachally	Nenagh
Incha More	439	Owney and Arra	Templeachally	Nenagh
Inchadrinagh	305	Owney and Arra	Kilvellane	Nenagh
Inchadrinagh	282	Owney and Arra	Templeachally	Nenagh
Inchagreana	6	Clanwilliam	Kilfeakle	Tipperary
Inchanabraher	30	Iffa and Offa East	Killaloan	Clonmel
Inchinsquillib	707	Kilnamanagh Upper	Toem	Tipperary
Inchirourke	1,492	Slievardagh	Fennor	Thurles
Inchivara	271	Kilnamanagh Upper	Toem	Tipperary
Inchnamuck	274	Iffa and Offa West	Shanrahan	Clogheen
Inishlounaght	348	Iffa and Offa East	Inishlounaght	Clonmel
Irby	116	Ikerrin	Roscrea	Roscrea
Islandbawn	140	Upper Ormond	Lisbunny	Nenagh
Islands	344	Slievardagh	Lismalin	Callan
Islands, The	28	Iffa and Offa East	Carrick	Carrick on Suir
Islandwood	260	Lower Ormond	Modreeny	Borrisokane
Ivyhall	74	Eliogarty	Templemore	Thurles
Jamestown	318	Slievardagh	Modeshil	Callan
Jamestown	310	Iffa and Offa East	Rathronan	Clonmel
Jessfield	388	Slievardagh	Ballingarry	Callan
Jockeyhall	42	Eliogarty	Templemore	Thurles
Johnstown	802	Lower Ormond	Killodiernan	Borrisokane
Jordansquarter	85	Upper Ormond	Kilnaneave	Nenagh
Jossestown	671	Middlethird	Donaghmore	Cashel
Keal	52	Iffa and Offa West	Neddans	Clogheen
Kedrah	751	Iffa and Offa West	Mortlestown	Clogheen
Kerane	93	Upper Ormond	Dolla	Nenagh
Kevanstown North	163	Lower Ormond	Kilbarron	Borrisokane
Kevanstown South	44	Lower Ormond	Kilbarron	Borrisokane
Keylong	84	Iffa and Offa West	Caher	Clogheen
Kilballyboy	1,419	Iffa and Offa West	Tullaghorton	Clogheen
Kilballygorman	354	Iffa and Offa West	Ballybacon	Clogheen
Kilballyhemikin	446	Ikerrin	Killea	Roscrea
Kilballyherberry	745	Middlethird	Ballysheehan	Cashel
Kilbarron	108	Lower Ormond	Kilbarron	Borrisokane
Kilbeg	230	Iffa and Offa West	Shanrahan	Clogheen
Kilbeg	208	Kilnamanagh Upper	Toem	Tipperary
Kilbeg	188	Lower Ormond	Finnoe	Borrisokane
Kilbiller	280	Lower Ormond	Kilbarron	Borrisokane
Kilboy	578	Upper Ormond	Kilmore	Nenagh
Kilboy	67	Slievardagh	Graystown	Cashel
Kilbragh	324	Middlethird	Kilbragh	Cashel
Kilbragh	131	Middlethird	Railstown	Cashel
Kilbrannel	293	Slievardagh	Kilcooly	Cashel
Kilbraugh	651	Slievardagh	Buolick	Urlingford
Kilbreedy	320	Middlethird	Ardmayle	Cashel
Kilbreedy	174	Middlethird	Cooleagh	Cashel
Kilbrickane	78	Eliogarty	Loughmoe East	Thurles
Kilburry East	272	Slievardagh	Cloneen	Callan
Kilburry West	143	Middlethird	Cloneen	Callan
Kilcarren	382	Lower Ormond	Lorrha	Borrisokane
Kilcarroon	1,634	Iffa and Offa West	Shanrahan	Clogheen
**Kilcash**	Town	Iffa and Offa East	Kilcash	Clonmel
Kilcash	1,115	Iffa and Offa East	Kilcash	Clonmel
Kilclareen	156	Eliogarty	Templemore	Thurles
Kilclonagh	758	Eliogarty	Kilclonagh	Thurles
Kilcoke	180	Eliogarty	Loughmoe East	Thurles
Kilcolman	190	Owney and Arra	Youghalarra	Nenagh
Kilcolman	152	Owney and Arra	Burgesbeg	Nenagh
Kilcommon	297	Kilnamanagh Upper	Templebeg	Thurles
Kilcommon	202	Lower Ormond	Aglishcloghane	Borrisokane
Kilcommon Beg	337	Iffa and Offa West	Caher	Clogheen
Kilcommon More (North)	572	Iffa and Offa West	Caher	Clogheen
Kilcommon More (South)	604	Iffa and Offa West	Caher	Clogheen
Kilconane	293	Upper Ormond	Lisbunny	Nenagh
Kilconnell	587	Middlethird	Kilconnell	Cashel
Kilcoolyabbey	1,455	Slievardagh	Kilcooly	Urlingford
Kilcoran	953	Iffa and Offa West	Tubbrid	Clogheen
Kilcornan	376	Clanwilliam	Kilcornan	Tipperary
Kilcowran	176	Lower Ormond	Finnoe	Borrisokane
Kilcroe	71	Kilnamanagh Lower	Clogher	Cashel
Kilcunnahin Beg	281	Lower Ormond	Ballingarry	Borrisokane
Kilcunnahin More	389	Lower Ormond	Ballingarry	Borrisokane
Kilcurkree	456	Eliogarty	Loughmoe East	Thurles
Kildanoge	2,676	Iffa and Offa West	Ballybacon	Clogheen
Kilduff	629	Ikerrin	Killea	Roscrea
Kileroe	109	Kilnamanagh Upper	Glenkeen	Thurles
Kilfadda	744	Lower Ormond	Aglishcloghane	Borrisokane
Kilfeakle	1,208	Clanwilliam	Kilfeakle	Tipperary
Kilfeakle Churchquarter	286	Clanwilliam	Kilfeakle	Tipperary
Kilfithmone	200	Eliogarty	Kilfithmone	Thurles
Kilfithmone	27	Kilnamanagh Upper	Glenkeen	Thurles
Kilgarvan	182	Lower Ormond	Kilbarron	Borrisokane
Kilgask	663	Lower Ormond	Lorrha	Borrisokane
Kilgorteen	201	Upper Ormond	Ballymackey	Nenagh
Kilgrogy Beg	17	Iffa and Offa West	Ballybacon	Clogheen
Kilgrogy Mor	191	Iffa and Offa West	Ballybacon	Clogheen
Kilheffernan	209	Iffa and Offa East	Killaloan	Clonmel
Kilkeary	366	Upper Ormond	Kilkeary	Nenagh
Kilkennybeg	898	Middlethird	St. Johnstown	Cashel
Kilkillahara	578	Eliogarty	Loughmoe West	Thurles
Kilkip East	52	Ikerrin	Killea	Roscrea
Kilkip West	124	Ikerrin	Killea	Roscrea
Kilknockan	753	Middlethird	Rathcool	Cashel
Killadangan	781	Lower Ormond	Killodiernan	Nenagh
Killaghy	351	Slievardagh	Kilvemnon	Callan
Killahagan	471	Eliogarty	Drom	Thurles
Killahara	821	Eliogarty	Loughmoe West	Thurles
Killaidamee	156	Iffa and Offa West	Ballybacon	Clogheen
Killalane	318	Owney and Arra	Killoscully	Nenagh
Killaloan Lower	186	Iffa and Offa East	Killaloan	Clonmel
Killaloan Upper	96	Iffa and Offa East	Killaloan	Clonmel
Killamoyne	260	Kilnamanagh Upper	Glenkeen	Thurles
Killanafinch	718	Upper Ormond	Kilkeary	Nenagh
Killanafinch	224	Upper Ormond	Latteragh	Nenagh
Killanigan	317	Eliogarty	Loughmoe East	Thurles
Killard	265	Lower Ormond	Knigh	Nenagh
Killary	209	Owney and Arra	Templeachally	Nenagh
Killary (Hayes)	230	Owney and Arra	Templeachally	Nenagh
Killary (Smith)	88	Owney and Arra	Templeachally	Nenagh
Killaun	339	Lower Ormond	Dromineer	Nenagh
Killavalla	91	Upper Ormond	Kilnaneave	Nenagh
Killavalla	89	Upper Ormond	Aghnameadle	Nenagh
Killavalla	19	Lower Ormond	Borrisokane	Borrisokane
Killavally	593	Middlethird	Kiltinan	Clonmel
Killavenoge	43	Iffa and Offa West	Shanrahan	Clogheen
Killavinoge	161	Ikerrin	Killavinoge	Roscrea
Killawardy	469	Ikerrin	Killea	Waterford
Killawardy	101	Ikerrin	Templemore	Roscrea
Killea	521	Lower Ormond	Finnoe	Borrisokane
Killea	177	Clanwilliam	Bruis	Tipperary
Killea	79	Ikerrin	Killea	Roscrea
Killea	56	Lower Ormond	Kilruane	Nenagh
Killea	4	Lower Ormond	Ardcrony	Nenagh
Killeatin	1,198	Iffa and Offa West	Shanrahan	Clogheen
Killeen	1,565	Slievardagh	Killenaule	Cashel
Killeen	1,050	Lower Ormond	Loughkeen	Parsonstown
Killeen	504	Owney and Arra	Kilnarath	Nenagh
Killeen	501	Upper Ormond	Kilnaneave	Nenagh
Killeen	288	Owney and Arra	Kilcomenty	Nenagh
Killeen	226	Owney and Arra	Killoscully	Nenagh
Killeen	197	Lower Ormond	Loughkeen	Parsonstown
Killeen	128	Lower Ormond	Terryglass	Borrisokane
Killeenagallive	575	Clanwilliam	Templebredon	Tipperary
Killeenasteena	363	Middlethird	Killeenasteena	Cashel
Killeenbutler	249	Iffa and Offa West	Caher	Clogheen
Killeenleigh	162	Eliogarty	Loughmoe East	Thurles
Killeenyarda	231	Eliogarty	Holycross	Thurles
Killeheen	271	Slievardagh	Ballingarry	Callan
Killeigh	150	Iffa and Offa West	Caher	Clogheen
Killeisk	119	Upper Ormond	Ballymackey	Nenagh
Killemly	208	Iffa and Offa West	Caher	Clogheen
**Killenaule**	Town	Slievardagh	Killenaule	Cashel
Killenaule	324	Slievardagh	Killenaule	Cashel
Killenaule	126	Lower Ormond	Loughkeen	Parsonstown
Killenaule	125	Lower Ormond	Dorrha	Parsonstown
Killenure	354	Kilnamanagh Lower	Oughterleague	Cashel
Killerk North	468	Middlethird	Donaghmore	Cashel
Killerk South	4	Middlethird	Donaghmore	Cashel
Killinane	254	Eliogarty	Thurles	Thurles
Killinch	117	Slievardagh	Templemichael	Carrick on Suir
Killinleigh	57	Kilnamanagh Upper	Moyaliff	Thurles
Killinure	95	Iffa and Offa West	Tubbrid	Clogheen
Killistafford	157	Middlethird	Brickendown	Cashel
Killock	30	Iffa and Offa East	Ballyclerahan	Clonmel
Killoran	1,594	Eliogarty	Moyne	Thurles
Killoran	148	Owney and Arra	Castletownarra	Nenagh
Killoscully	106	Owney and Arra	Killoscully	Nenagh
Killoskehan	2,541	Ikerrin	Killoskehan	Roscrea
Killough	849	Ikerrin	Templemore	Roscrea
Killough	499	Middlethird	Gaile	Cashel
Killowney Big	141	Upper Ormond	Ballymackey	Nenagh
Killowney Little	569	Upper Ormond	Ballymackey	Nenagh
Killurane	642	Lower Ormond	Modreeny	Borrisokane
Killurney	1,262	Iffa and Offa East	Temple-etney	Clonmel
Killusty North	739	Middlethird	Kiltinan	Clonmel
Killusty South	616	Middlethird	Kiltinan	Clonmel
Killylaughnane	80	Upper Ormond	Kilruane	Nenagh
Kilmacogue	160	Owney and Arra	Kilnarath	Nenagh
Kilmacuddy	228	Ikerrin	Killea	Roscrea
Kilmacuddy	14	Ikerrin	Bourney	Roscrea
Kilmaglasderry	192	Owney and Arra	Templeachally	Nenagh
Kilmakill	1,219	Eliogarty	Moyne	Thurles
Kilmaloge	559	Iffa and Offa West	Derrygrath	Clogheen
Kilmaloge	127	Iffa and Offa West	Rochestown	Clogheen
Kilmaloge	16	Iffa and Offa West	Ardfinnan	Clogheen
Kilmaneen	194	Iffa and Offa West	Ballybacon	Clogheen
Kilmastulla	377	Owney and Arra	Kilmastulla	Nenagh
Kilmelan	44	Eliogarty	Moycarky	Thurles
Kilmolash Lower	293	Iffa and Offa East	Inishlounaght	Clonmel
Kilmolash Upper	58	Iffa and Offa East	Inishlounaght	Clonmel
Kilmore	683	Iffa and Offa East	Lisronagh	Clonmel
Kilmore	638	Kilnamanagh Upper	Toem	Tipperary
Kilmore	161	Upper Ormond	Kilmore	Nenagh
Kilmore	125	Kilnamanagh Lower	Clonoulty	Cashel
Kilmore Lower	71	Kilnamanagh Lower	Kilmore	Cashel
Kilmore Upper	757	Kilnamanagh Lower	Kilmore	Cashel
Kilmoyler	185	Clanwilliam	Killardry	Tipperary
Kilmurry	93	Iffa and Offa West	Derrygrath	Clonmel
Kilnacappagh	183	Owney and Arra	Kilvellane	Nenagh
Kilnacarriga	1,204	Iffa and Offa West	Newcastle	Clogheen
Kilnacask Lower	86	Clanwilliam	Relickmurry & Athassel	Tipperary
Kilnacask Upper	137	Clanwilliam	Relickmurry & Athassel	Tipperary
Kilnacranna	172	Owney and Arra	Kilmastulla	Nenagh
Kilnagranagh	973	Slievardagh	Cloneen	Callan
Kilnahone	418	Slievardagh	Crohane	Callan
Kilnamona	146	Iffa and Offa West	Templetenny	Clogheen
Kilnaneave	686	Upper Ormond	Kilnaneave	Nenagh
Kilnaseer	196	Eliogarty	Loughmoe East	Thurles
Kilnashannally	106	Upper Ormond	Dolla	Nenagh
Kilnoe	160	Eliogarty	Moycarky	Thurles
Kilparteen	223	Owney and Arra	Castletownarra	Nenagh
Kilpatrick	475	Kilnamanagh Lower	Kilpatrick	Cashel
Kilpatrick	83	Clanwilliam	Lattin	Tipperary
Kilpheak	131	Middlethird	St. Patricksrock	Cashel
Kilregane	610	Lower Ormond	Lorrha	Borrisokane
Kilriffet	326	Upper Ormond	Dolla	Nenagh
Kilroe	428	Iffa and Offa West	Tubbrid	Clogheen
Kilroewood	105	Iffa and Offa West	Tubbrid	Clogheen
Kilross	541	Clanwilliam	Clonbeg	Tipperary
Kilross	73	Clanwilliam	Lattin	Tipperary
Kilruane	222	Lower Ormond	Kilruane	Nenagh
Kilrush	633	Eliogarty	Thurles	Thurles
Kilsallagh	415	Middlethird	Kilcommon	Cashel
Kilscobin	117	Middlethird	St. Patricksrock	Cashel
Kilshane	204	Clanwilliam	Kilshane	Tipperary
**Kilsheelan**	Town	Iffa and Offa East	Kilsheelan	Clonmel
Kilsheelan	92	Iffa and Offa East	Kilsheelan	Clonmel
Kilshenane	606	Clanwilliam	Oughterleague	Tipperary
Kiltankin	1,188	Iffa and Offa West	Templetenny	Clogheen
Kiltegan	116	Iffa and Offa East	Kiltegan	Clonmel
Kiltillane	506	Eliogarty	Templemore	Thurles
Kiltilliha	195	Eliogarty	Templemore	Thurles
Kiltinan	801	Middlethird	Kiltinan	Clonmel
Kiltyrome	169	Upper Ormond	Kilmore	Nenagh
Kilvemnon	563	Slievardagh	Kilvemnon	Callan
Kilvilcorris	401	Eliogarty	Drom	Thurles
Knigh	874	Lower Ormond	Knigh	Nenagh
Knockaarum	125	Iffa and Offa West	Shanrahan	Clogheen
Knockabritta	99	Slievardagh	Crohane	Callan
Knockacappul	405	Owney and Arra	Kilnarath	Nenagh
Knockacarhanduff-Commons	685	Kilnamanagh Upper	Moyaliff	Thurles
Knockacraheen	53	Upper Ormond	Kilnaneave	Nenagh
Knockacullin	462	Owney and Arra	Kilnarath	Nenagh
Knockacurra	93	Clanwilliam	Kilshane	Tipperary
Knockaderry	84	Kilnamanagh Lower	Clogher	Cashel
Knockadigeen	272	Upper Ormond	Kilnaneave	Nenagh
Knockadromin	324	Owney and Arra	Templeachally	Nenagh
Knockagh	1,096	Eliogarty	Drom	Thurles
Knockagh	341	Iffa and Offa West	Caher	Clogheen
Knockahunna	129	Upper Ormond	Ballymackey	Nenagh
Knockakelly	376	Kilnamanagh Upper	Glenkeen	Thurles
Knockakilly	141	Eliogarty	Galbooly	Thurles
Knockalegan	183	Clanwilliam	Templebredon	Tipperary
Knockalonga	195	Slievardagh	Ballingarry	Callan
Knockalough Commons	473	Kilnamanagh Upper	Templebeg	Thurles
Knockalton Lower	114	Upper Ormond	Lisbunny	Nenagh
Knockalton Upper	478	Upper Ormond	Lisbunny	Nenagh
Knockanabohilly	70	Upper Ormond	Kilruane	Nenagh
Knockanacartan	169	Lower Ormond	Cloghprior	Borrisokane
Knockanacree	499	Lower Ormond	Modreeny	Borrisokane
Knockanacunna	31	Eliogarty	Rahelty	Thurles
Knockanattin	118	Slievardagh	Crohane	Callan
Knockanavar	287	Kilnamanagh Upper	Toem	Tipperary
Knockanclash	354	Iffa and Offa East	Temple-etney	Clonmel
Knockancullenagh	363	Owney and Arra	Kilvellane	Nenagh
Knockane	591	Upper Ormond	Templedowney	Nenagh
Knockane	201	Kilnamanagh Upper	Templebeg	Thurles
Knockane	190	Kilnamanagh Upper	Toem	Tipperary
Knockane (Nash)	281	Iffa and Offa West	Tubbrid	Clogheen
Knockane (Puttoge)	180	Iffa and Offa West	Tubbrid	Clogheen
Knockane(Gurm)	69	Iffa and Offa West	Tubbrid	Clogheen
Knockanebeg	50	Iffa and Offa West	Tubbrid	Clogheen
Knockaneduff	97	Clanwilliam	Solloghod-more	Tipperary
Knockaneroe	33	Kilnamanagh Upper	Templebeg	Thurles
Knockanevin	215	Kilnamanagh Upper	Glenkeen	Thurles
Knockanfoil More	38	Owney and Arra	Youghalarra	Nenagh
Knockanglass	651	Slievardagh	Killenaule	Cashel
Knockanglass	495	Upper Ormond	Ballymackey	Nenagh
Knockanglass	147	Slievardagh	Buolick	Urlingford
Knockannabinna	89	Kilnamanagh Upper	Glenkeen	Thurles
Knockannamohilly	150	Owney and Arra	Youghalarra	Nenagh
Knockannapisha	44	Iffa and Offa West	Tubbrid	Clogheen
Knockannaveigh	289	Middlethird	Knockgraffon	Cashel
Knockanora	203	Kilnamanagh Upper	Glenkeen	Thurles
Knockanpierce	76	Upper Ormond	Nenagh	Nenagh
Knockanrawley	212	Clanwilliam	Cordangan	Tipperary
Knockanroe	760	Eliogarty	Templemore	Thurles
Knockanroe	333	Upper Ormond	Kilmore	Nenagh
Knockanroger	394	Ikerrin	Borrisnafarney	Roscrea
Knockantemple	154	Middlethird	St. Patricksrock	Cashel
Knockantibrien	87	Kilnamanagh Lower	Aghacrew	Tipperary
Knockatoor	66	Clanwilliam	Relickmurry & Athassel	Tipperary
Knockatoora Commons	122	Kilnamanagh Upper	Upperchurch	Thurles
Knockatooreen	427	Slievardagh	Kilcooly	Urlingford
Knockaunavgga	70	Ikerrin	Bourney	Roscrea
Knockauncourt	26	Iffa and Offa East	St. Mary's, Clonmel	Clonmel
Knockauns	133	Eliogarty	Thurles	Thurles
Knockavadagh	320	Slievardagh	Killenaule	Cashel
Knockavilla	132	Kilnamanagh Lower	Oughterleague	Cashel
Knockballiniry	741	Iffa and Offa West	Ballybacon	Clogheen
Knockballymaloogh	280	Clanwilliam	Clonbeg	Tipperary
Knockballynoe East	229	Clanwilliam	Kilfeakle	Tipperary
Knockballynoe West	80	Clanwilliam	Kilfeakle	Tipperary
Knockboordan	163	Middlethird	Fethard	Cashel
Knockboy	151	Slievardagh	Buolick	Urlingford
Knockbrack	169	Upper Ormond	Kilkeary	Nenagh
Knockbrack	109	Kilnamanagh Upper	Glenkeen	Thurles
Knockbrack	69	Middlethird	Fethard	Cashel
Knockbrit	298	Middlethird	Magorban	Cashel
Knockbulloge	62	Middlethird	St. Patricksrock	Cashel
Knockcurra	60	Eliogarty	Thurles	Thurles
Knockcurraghbola Commons	821	Kilnamanagh Upper	Upperchurch	Thurles
Knockcurraghbola Crownlands	153	Kilnamanagh Upper	Upperchurch	Thurles
Knockduff	206	Kilnamanagh Upper	Toem	Tipperary
Knockdunnee	199	Kilnamanagh Upper	Glenkeen	Thurles
Knockeen	152	Iffa and Offa West	Tullaghmelan	Clogheen
Knockeen	67	Eliogarty	Thurles	Thurles
Knockeevan	661	Iffa and Offa East	Newchapel	Clonmel
Knockfobole	138	Clanwilliam	Kilshane	Tipperary
Knockforlagh	236	Slievardagh	St. Johnbaptist	Cashel
Knockfune	768	Owney and Arra	Kilnarath	Nenagh
Knockfune	80	Upper Ormond	Aghnameadle	Nenagh
Knockgarve	159	Upper Ormond	Aghnameadle	Nenagh
Knockgorman	221	Kilnamanagh Lower	Donohill	Tipperary
Knockgraffon	2,420	Middlethird	Knockgraffon	Cashel
Knockilterra	118	Slievardagh	Crohane	Callan
Knockinrichard	27	Iffa and Offa West	Derrygrath	Clogheen
Knockinure	242	Kilnamanagh Upper	Glenkeen	Thurles
Knockkelly	1,347	Middlethird	Peppardstown	Cashel
Knocklofty-Demesne	399	Iffa and Offa West	Tullaghmelan	Clogheen
Knockmaroe	908	Kilnamanagh Upper	Upperchurch	Thurles
Knockmeale	232	Owney and Arra	Killoscully	Nenagh
Knockmeale	143	Upper Ormond	Dolla	Nenagh
Knockmehill	213	Kilnamanagh Upper	Templebeg	Thurles
Knockmehill East	17	Kilnamanagh Upper	Templebeg	Thurles
Knockmore	105	Owney and Arra	Youghalarra	Nenagh
Knockmorris	147	Iffa and Offa West	Caher	Clogheen
Knocknabansha	500	Kilnamanagh Upper	Upperchurch	Thurles
Knocknaboha	258	Iffa and Offa West	Mortlestown	Clogheen
Knocknabrogue	310	Upper Ormond	Latteragh	Nenagh
Knocknaconnery	163	Iffa and Offa East	Carrick	Carrick on Suir
Knocknadempsey	76	Iffa and Offa West	Neddans	Clogheen
Knocknagapple	186	Iffa and Offa West	Templetenny	Clogheen
Knocknagapple	88	Slievardagh	Crohane	Callan
Knocknagarve	159	Upper Ormond	Templederry	Nenagh
Knocknagoogh	176	Upper Ormond	Latteragh	Nenagh
Knocknagree	46	Iffa and Offa West	Tullaghmelan	Clogheen
Knocknaharney	321	Kilnamanagh Upper	Glenkeen	Thurles
Knocknakill	276	Kilnamanagh Upper	Templebeg	Thurles
Knocknakillardy	119	Iffa and Offa West	Neddans	Clogheen
Knocknamena Commons	562	Kilnamanagh Upper	Upperchurch	Thurles
Knocknamoheragh	372	Owney and Arra	Kilnarath	Nenagh
Knocknanuss	365	Eliogarty	Moycarky	Thurles
Knocknaquil	165	Middlethird	Knockgraffon	Cashel
Knocknaskeharoe	33	Iffa and Offa West	Ardfinnan	Clogheen
Knockordan	234	Clanwilliam	Lattin	Tipperary
Knockphelagh	580	Clanwilliam	Solloghod-more	Tipperary
Knockrathkelly	99	Iffa and Offa East	Kilcash	Clonmel
Knockrinahan	128	Owney and Arra	Youghalarra	Nenagh
Knockroe	494	Middlethird	Drangan	Cashel
Knockroe	362	Eliogarty	Moycarky	Thurles
Knockroe	188	Clanwilliam	Relickmurry & Athassel	Tipperary
Knockroe	185	Eliogarty	Rahelty	Thurles
Knockroe	158	Middlethird	Relickmurry & Athassel	Cashel
Knockroe	84	Kilnamanagh Lower	Kilpatrick	Cashel
Knockroe	32	Iffa and Offa West	Neddans	Clogheen
Knocksaintlour	80	Middlethird	St. Johnbaptist	Cashel
Knockshanbrittas	825	Kilnamanagh Upper	Doon	Tipperary
Knockshearoon	252	Kilnamanagh Upper	Glenkeen	Thurles
Knockshigowna	218	Lower Ormond	Ballingarry	Borrisokane
Knockskagh	150	Iffa and Offa West	Mortlestown	Clogheen
Knockstowry	34	Eliogarty	Moycarky	Thurles
Knockulty	317	Slievardagh	Lismalin	Callan
Knockuragh	330	Middlethird	Drangan	Cashel
Knockwilliam	94	Kilnamanagh Upper	Glenkeen	Thurles
Kylaglass	125	Slievardagh	Kilvemnon	Callan
Kylanoreashy	382	Iffa and Offa East	Kilcash	Clonmel
Kylatlea	310	Slievardagh	Kilvemnon	Callan
Kylawilling	129	Slievardagh	Kilvemnon	Callan
Kyle	655	Middlethird	Drangan	Cashel
Kyle	422	Clanwilliam	Solloghod-beg	Tipperary
Kyle	314	Lower Ormond	Ardcrony	Borrisokane
Kyle	76	Eliogarty	Rahelty	Thurles
Kyle	56	Upper Ormond	Kilruane	Nenagh
Kyleaduhir	224	Slievardagh	Modeshil	Callan
Kyleagarry	111	Clanwilliam	Solloghod-beg	Tipperary
Kyleaglanna	283	Slievardagh	Modeshil	Callan
Kyleannagh	191	Ikerrin	Bourney	Roscrea
Kyleashinnaun	251	Lower Ormond	Modreeny	Borrisokane
Kyleballygalvan	408	Slievardagh	Ballingarry	Callan
Kylebeg	190	Lower Ormond	Aglishcloghane	Borrisokane
Kylebeg	179	Upper Ormond	Ballynaclogh	Nenagh
Kylebeg	131	Lower Ormond	Modreeny	Borrisokane
Kylebeg	55	Owney and Arra	Youghalarra	Nenagh
Kylebeg	17	Eliogarty	Templemore	Thurles
Kylefreaghane	195	Slievardagh	Kilvemnon	Callan
Kylemore	155	Ikerrin	Templeree	Thurles
Kylenaheskeragh	542	Upper Ormond	Ballygibbon	Nenagh
Kylenamuck	269	Lower Ormond	Loughkeen	Parsonstown
Kyleomadaun East	192	Lower Ormond	Finnoe	Borrisokane
Kyleomadaun West	226	Lower Ormond	Finnoe	Borrisokane
Kyleonermody	106	Lower Ormond	Borrisokane	Borrisokane
Kyletombrickane	743	Lower Ormond	Borrisokane	Borrisokane
Lacka	1,228	Lower Ormond	Loughkeen	Parsonstown
Lacka	51	Lower Ormond	Ballingarry	Parsonstown
Lackabrack	1,386	Owney and Arra	Killoscully	Nenagh
Lackabrack	102	Lower Ormond	Aglishcloghane	Borrisokane
Lackagh	272	Owney and Arra	Killoscully	Nenagh
Lackakera	497	Upper Ormond	Latteragh	Nenagh
Lackamore	340	Owney and Arra	Kilvellane	Nenagh
Lackamore	181	Owney and Arra	Castletownarra	Nenagh
Lackanabrickane	32	Iffa and Offa West	Ballybacon	Clogheen
Lackandarra	14	Kilnamanagh Upper	Moyaliff	Thurles
Lackantedane	123	Clanwilliam	Clonpet	Tipperary
Lackaroe	121	Owney and Arra	Castletownarra	Nenagh
Lacken	354	Lower Ormond	Terryglass	Borrisokane
Lacken	309	Clanwilliam	Cordangan	Tipperary
Lacken	309	Clanwilliam	Rathlynin	Tipperary
Lacken	109	Iffa and Offa West	Neddans	Clogheen
Lackenacoombe	339	Kilnamanagh Lower	Donohill	Tipperary
Lackenacreena	301	Kilnamanagh Lower	Donohill	Tipperary
Lackenavea (Dunalley)	234	Owney and Arra	Kilmastulla	Nenagh
Lackenavea (Egremont)	274	Owney and Arra	Kilmastulla	Nenagh
Lackenavorna	484	Upper Ormond	Aghnameadle	Nenagh
Ladysabbey	16	Iffa and Offa West	Ballybacon	Clogheen
Ladyswell	7	Middlethird	St. Johnbaptist	Cashel
Laffina	82	Clanwilliam	Rathlynin	Tipperary
Laffina (Jones)	268	Kilnamanagh Lower	Clogher	Cashel
Laffina (Lane)	285	Kilnamanagh Lower	Clogher	Cashel
Laganore	68	Iffa and Offa East	Kilgrant	Clonmel
Lagganstown Lower	603	Clanwilliam	Relickmurry & Athassel	Tipperary
Lagganstown Upper	367	Clanwilliam	Relickmurry & Athassel	Tipperary
Laghile	1,512	Owney and Arra	Abington	Nenagh
Laghile	458	Upper Ormond	Aghnameadle	Nenagh
Laghile	152	Eliogarty	Loughmoe West	Thurles
Laghtagalla	93	Eliogarty	Thurles	Thurles
Laghtea	214	Owney and Arra	Castletownarra	Nenagh
Lahagh	555	Ikerrin	Templeree	Thurles
Lahardan Lower	256	Eliogarty	Twomileborris	Thurles
Lahardan Upper	277	Eliogarty	Twomileborris	Thurles
Lahesseragh	392	Upper Ormond	Nenagh	Nenagh
Lahesseragh	83	Lower Ormond	Kilbarron	Borrisokane
Lahesseragh	40	Ikerrin	Killea	Roscrea
Lahid	737	Upper Ormond	Kilmore	Nenagh
Lalor's-lot	817	Middlethird	St. Johnbaptist	Cashel
Landsdown	139	Owney and Arra	Castletownarra	Nenagh
Lanespark	991	Slievardagh	Killenaule	Cashel
Larha North	8	Eliogarty	Drom	Thurles
Larha South	24	Eliogarty	Drom	Thurles
Latteragh	476	Upper Ormond	Latteragh	Nenagh
Lattin East	206	Clanwilliam	Lattin	Tipperary
Lattin North	264	Clanwilliam	Lattin	Tipperary
Lattin West	180	Clanwilliam	Lattin	Tipperary
Lavally Lower	224	Iffa and Offa East	Newchapel	Clonmel
Lavally Upper	180	Iffa and Offa East	Newchapel	Clonmel
Lawlesstown	226	Iffa and Offa East	Kiltegan	Clonmel
Lawlesstown	179	Iffa and Offa East	Rathronan	Clonmel
Leagane	354	Owney and Arra	Templeachally	Nenagh
Leenane East	37	Clanwilliam	Donohill	Tipperary
Leenane West	56	Kilnamanagh Lower	Donohill	Tipperary
Lehinch	761	Lower Ormond	Lorrha	Borrisokane
Lehinch	3	Lower Ormond	Dorrha	Parsonstown
Leigh	2,140	Eliogarty	Twomileborris	Thurles
Lelagh	366	Lower Ormond	Dorrha	Parsonstown
Leugh	434	Kilnamanagh Upper	Doon	Tipperary
Lewagh Beg	198	Eliogarty	Thurles	Thurles
Lewagh More	296	Eliogarty	Thurles	Thurles
Lickfinn	575	Slievardagh	Lickfinn	Urlingford
Lickfinn	340	Slievardagh	Crohane	Urlingford
Lisballyard	610	Lower Ormond	Dorrha	Parsonstown
Lisbalting	144	Iffa and Offa East	Kilcash	Clonmel
Lisbook	80	Eliogarty	Holycross	Cashel
Lisbrien	123	Upper Ormond	Kilmore	Nenagh
Lisbryan	460	Lower Ormond	Ballingarry	Borrisokane
Lisbryan	13	Lower Ormond	Aglishcloghane	Borrisokane
Lisbunny	535	Upper Ormond	Lisbunny	Nenagh
Liscahill	90	Eliogarty	Thurles	Thurles
Liscreagh	257	Eliogarty	Inch	Thurles
Lisdalleen & Drummin	596	Ikerrin	Templetuohy	Thurles
Lisdonowley	462	Eliogarty	Moyne	Thurles
Lisduff	638	Slievardagh	Kilcooly	Urlingford
Lisduff	508	Lower Ormond	Aglishcloghane	Borrisokane
Lisduff	263	Ikerrin	Rathnaveoge	Roscrea
Lisduff	236	Clanwilliam	Lattin	Tipperary
Lisduff	230	Eliogarty	Rahelty	Thurles
Lisduff	40	Upper Ormond	Kilmore	Nenagh
Lisfunshion	722	Iffa and Offa West	Templetenny	Clogheen
Lisgarode	318	Upper Ormond	Kilruane	Nenagh
Lisgarriff	91	Upper Ormond	Dolla	Nenagh
Lisgarriff	81	Lower Ormond	Ardcrony	Borrisokane
Lisgarriff East	154	Upper Ormond	Dolla	Nenagh
Lisgarriff West	380	Upper Ormond	Dolla	Nenagh
Lisgibbon	327	Clanwilliam	Relickmurry & Athassel	Tipperary
Lisglenbeha	151	Ikerrin	Corbally	Roscrea
Lisheen	990	Eliogarty	Moyne	Thurles
Lisheen	378	Lower Ormond	Uskane	Borrisokane
Lisheen	245	Kilnamanagh Upper	Moyaliff	Cashel
Lisheen	181	Lower Ormond	Aglishcloghane	Borrisokane
Lisheen	180	Lower Ormond	Dorrha	Parsonstown
Lisheen	151	Clanwilliam	Ballygriffin	Tipperary
Lisheen	103	Clanwilliam	Templenoe	Tipperary
Lisheen	69	Clanwilliam	Clonbullogue	Tipperary
Lisheen Beg	162	Clanwilliam	Ballygriffin	Tipperary
Lisheenacloonta	172	Upper Ormond	Kilmore	Nenagh
Lisheenagower	214	Upper Ormond	Ballymackey	Nenagh
Lisheenaleen	49	Clanwilliam	Donohill	Tipperary
Lisheenanoul	185	Iffa and Offa West	Ballybacon	Clogheen
Lisheenataggart	463	Eliogarty	Loughmoe West	Thurles
Lisheenboy	54	Lower Ormond	Aglishcloghane	Borrisokane
Lisheenbrien	149	Owney and Arra	Castletownarra	Nenagh
Lisheendarby	69	Clanwilliam	Donohill	Tipperary
Lisheenfrankagh	179	Clanwilliam	Donohill	Tipperary
Lisheenkyle	70	Clanwilliam	Solloghod-beg	Tipperary
Lisheennamalausa	128	Clanwilliam	Solloghod-more	Tipperary
Lisheenpower	142	Iffa and Offa West	Ballybacon	Clogheen
Lisheentyrone	49	Owney and Arra	Castletownarra	Nenagh
Lisheentyrone South	10	Owney and Arra	Castletownarra	Nenagh
Liskeveen	1,453	Eliogarty	Ballymurreen	Thurles
Liskinlahan	332	Lower Ormond	Borrisokane	Borrisokane
Lisleighbeg	220	Lower Ormond	Borrisokane	Borrisokane
Lisloran	392	Clanwilliam	Ballygriffin	Cashel
Lismacrory	619	Lower Ormond	Ballingarry	Borrisokane
Lismacue	241	Clanwilliam	Templeneiry	Tipperary
Lismakeeve	122	Kilnamanagh Upper	Glenkeen	Thurles
Lismakin	316	Ikerrin	Corbally	Roscrea
Lismalin	554	Slievardagh	Lismalin	Callan
Lismaline	210	Lower Ormond	Uskane	Borrisokane
Lismore	225	Upper Ormond	Ballymackey	Nenagh
Lismortagh	447	Middlethird	Cooleagh	Cashel
Lismoynan	463	Middlethird	St. Johnstown	Cashel
Lismurphy	20	Clanwilliam	Donohill	Tipperary
Lisnagaul	590	Clanwilliam	Cordangan	Tipperary
Lisnageenly	765	Upper Ormond	Kilmore	Nenagh
Lisnagonoge	261	Eliogarty	Holycross	Thurles
Lisnagower	280	Lower Ormond	Ballingarry	Borrisokane
Lisnagrough	231	Eliogarty	Holycross	Thurles
Lisnamoe	219	Upper Ormond	Ballymackey	Nenagh
Lisnamrock	317	Slievardagh	Ballingarry	Callan
Lisnamuck	367	Iffa and Offa West	Derrygrath	Clogheen
Lisnareelin	60	Ikerrin	Killea	Roscrea
Lisnasella	106	Kilnamanagh Upper	Ballycahill	Thurles
Lisnasoolmoy	248	Lower Ormond	Ardcrony	Borrisokane
Lisnatubbrid	540	Iffa and Offa East	Temple-etney	Clonmel
Lisnaviddoge North	89	Eliogarty	Templemore	Thurles
Lisnaviddoge South	59	Eliogarty	Templemore	Thurles
Lisquillibeen?	384	Lower Ormond	Kilbarron	Borrisokane
Lisronagh	573	Iffa and Offa East	Lisronagh	Clonmel
Liss	321	Kilnamanagh Upper	Glenkeen	Thurles
Lissadober	375	Iffa and Offa East	Kilmurry	Carrick on Suir
Lissadonna	403	Lower Ormond	Ballingarry	Borrisokane
Lissagadda	167	Lower Ormond	Lorrha	Borrisokane
Lissakyle	70	Iffa and Offa West	Caher	Clogheen
Lissanisky	272	Upper Ormond	Ballymackey	Nenagh
Lissanure	504	Ikerrin	Templetuohy	Thurles
Lissanure	186	Ikerrin	Killavinoge	Thurles
Lissaroon	296	Eliogarty	Inch	Thurles
Lissatunny	252	Upper Ormond	Ballynaclogh	Nenagh
Lissava	808	Iffa and Offa West	Caher	Clogheen
Lissenhall	242	Upper Ormond	Kilmore	Nenagh
Lissernane	609	Lower Ormond	Lorrha	Borrisokane
Lissobihane	568	Clanwilliam	Emly	Tipperary
Lissyleamy	43	Upper Ormond	Kilmore	Nenagh
Lisvarrinane	661	Clanwilliam	Clonbeg	Tipperary
Littlefield	179	Slievardagh	Buolick	Urlingford
**Littleton**	Town	Eliogarty	Twomileborris	Thurles
Lloydsborough	322	Eliogarty	Templemore	Thurles
Lloydsborough	247	Ikerrin	Killea	Roscrea
Lodge	263	Lower Ormond	Killodiernan	Nenagh
Lodge	155	Iffa and Offa West	Ballybacon	Clogheen
Logg	83	Upper Ormond	Kilmore	Nenagh
Lognafulla	60	Eliogarty	Thurles	Thurles
Long Island	38	Lower Ormond	Lorrha	Borrisokane
Longfield	240	Middlethird	Ardmayle	Cashel
Longford	752	Clanwilliam	Clonbeg	Tipperary
Longford	369	Ikerrin	Bourney	Roscrea
Longford	75	Clanwilliam	Cordangan	Tipperary
Longford	53	Ikerrin	Rathnaveoge	Roscrea
Longford Wood	243	Ikerrin	Bourney	Roscrea
Longfordpass East	101	Eliogarty	Kilcooly	Thurles
Longfordpass North	1,345	Eliogarty	Kilcooly	Thurles
Longfordpass South	1,068	Eliogarty	Kilcooly	Thurles
Longjohnshill	582	Upper Ormond	Kilnaneave	Nenagh
Longorchard	836	Ikerrin	Templetuohy	Thurles
Longstone	505	Clanwilliam	Kilcornan	Tipperary
Longstone	183	Clanwilliam	Cullen	Tipperary
Longstone	149	Owney and Arra	Killoscully	Nenagh
Loran	485	Ikerrin	Bourney	Roscrea
**Lorrha**	Town	Lower Ormond	Lorrha	Borrisokane
Lorrha	1,636	Lower Ormond	Lorrha	Borrisokane
Losset	171	Kilnamanagh Upper	Toem	Tipperary
Losset	152	Kilnamanagh Upper	Doon	Tipperary
Loughacutteen	147	Iffa and Offa West	Whitechurch	Clogheen
Loughanavatta	214	Ikerrin	Roscrea	Roscrea
Loughane Lower	123	Upper Ormond	Kilnaneave	Nenagh
Loughane Upper	223	Upper Ormond	Kilnaneave	Nenagh
Loughaun	596	Lower Ormond	Modreeny	Borrisokane
Loughaun	115	Owney and Arra	Youghalarra	Nenagh
Loughaun	42	Iffa and Offa West	Caher	Clogheen
Loughaun	40	Lower Ormond	Aglishcloghane	Borrisokane
Loughbeg	72	Eliogarty	Rahelty	Thurles
Loughbrack	367	Kilnamanagh Upper	Templebeg	Thurles
Loughcapple	259	Middlethird	Kiltinan	Clonmel
Loughfeedora	139	Middlethird	St. Patricksrock	Cashel
Loughkeen	226	Lower Ormond	Loughkeen	Parsonstown
Loughkent East	250	Middlethird	Knockgraffon	Cashel
Loughkent Lower	328	Middlethird	Knockgraffon	Cashel
Loughkent West	265	Middlethird	Knockgraffon	Cashel
Loughlahan	38	Eliogarty	Thurles	Thurles
Loughlohery	904	Iffa and Offa West	Caher	Clogheen
**Loughmoe**	Town	Eliogarty	Loughmoe West	Thurles
Loughnafina	18	Middlethird	St. Johnbaptist	Cashel
Loughourna	1,062	Lower Ormond	Knigh	Nenagh
Loughpark	48	Ikerrin	Roscrea	Roscrea
Loughtally	536	Iffa and Offa East	Inishlounaght	Clonmel
Lowesgreen	230	Middlethird	Kilbragh	Cashel
Lurgoe	1,375	Slievardagh	Graystown	Cashel
Lyonstown	492	Middlethird	St. Patricksrock	Cashel
Lyre	557	Clanwilliam	Clonbeg	Tipperary
Lyrefune	1,272	Iffa and Offa West	Templetenny	Clogheen
Mackanagh Lower	231	Clanwilliam	Clonbeg	Tipperary
Mackanagh Upper	595	Clanwilliam	Clonbeg	Tipperary
Mackinawood	203	Slievardagh	Lismalin	Callan
Mackney (Bourke)	43	Owney and Arra	Kilnarath	Nenagh
Mackney (O'Brien)	31	Owney and Arra	Kilnarath	Nenagh
Macreary	809	Iffa and Offa East	Kilmurry	Carrick on Suir
Madamsland	39	Middlethird	Redcity	Cashel
Magheranenagh	250	Lower Ormond	Ardcrony	Nenagh
Magherareagh	332	Iffa and Offa West	Tubbrid	Clogheen
Magherareagh	273	Eliogarty	Inch	Thurles
Magherareagh	54	Iffa and Offa West	Ardfinnan	Clogheen
Maginstown	475	Middlethird	Mora	Cashel
Magorban	225	Middlethird	Magorban	Cashel
Magowry	663	Middlethird	Magowry	Cashel
Mainstown	279	Iffa and Offa East	Newtownlennan	Carrick on Suir
Mangan	257	Slievardagh	Templemichael	Carrick on Suir
Manna North	131	Eliogarty	Templemore	Thurles
Manna South	225	Eliogarty	Templemore	Thurles
Manselstown	360	Eliogarty	Moyne	Thurles
Manserghshill	326	Slievardagh	St. Johnbaptist	Cashel
Mantlehill Great	678	Clanwilliam	Relickmurry & Athassel	Tipperary
Mantlehill Little	167	Clanwilliam	Relickmurry & Athassel	Tipperary
**Mardyke**	Town	Slievardagh	Graystown	Callan
Mardyke	173	Eliogarty	Loughmoe East	Thurles
Mardyke	115	Slievardagh	Graystown	Callan
Marlfield	436	Iffa and Offa East	Inishlounaght	Clonmel
Marlhill	673	Middlethird	Knockgraffon	Cashel
Marlhill	304	Iffa and Offa West	Ardfinnan	Clogheen
Marlow	390	Kilnamanagh Lower	Clogher	Cashel
Marshalstown	70	Middlethird	Ballysheehan	Cashel
Maryglen	98	Owney and Arra	Killoscully	Nenagh
Masterstown	530	Clanwilliam	Relickmurry & Athassel	Tipperary
Maudemount	195	Kilnamanagh Lower	Kilpatrick	Cashel
Mauganstown	292	Iffa and Offa East	Kilsheelan	Clonmel
Mayladstown	576	Iffa and Offa East	Kilcash	Clonmel
Mealclye	105	Kilnamanagh Lower	Donohill	Cashel
Meelick	90	Lower Ormond	Kilbarron	Borrisokane
Meldrum	589	Middlethird	Brickendown	Cashel
Mellisson	635	Slievardagh	Buolick	Urlingford
Mertonhall	369	Lower Ormond	Modreeny	Borrisokane
Middleplough	136	Upper Ormond	Templederry	Nenagh
Middlequarter	2,270	Iffa and Offa West	Newcastle	Clogheen
Middlequarter	486	Owney and Arra	Killoscully	Nenagh
Middletown	219	Lower Ormond	Uskane	Borrisokane
Middlewalk	695	Upper Ormond	Ballygibbon	Nenagh
Mien	479	Ikerrin	Killea	Roscrea
Milestown	345	Middlethird	Cloneen	Cashel
Milford	81	Lower Ormond	Aglishcloghane	Borrisokane
Millbrook	452	Upper Ormond	Kilnaneave	Nenagh
Millpark	83	Ikerrin	Roscrea	Roscrea
Milltown	295	Kilnamanagh Lower	Clogher	Cashel
Milltown	236	Clanwilliam	Cullen	Tipperary
Milltown	93	Clanwilliam	Solloghod-more	Tipperary
Milltown Beg	184	Middlethird	Mora	Cashel
Milltown Britton	736	Middlethird	Baptistgrange	Clonmel
Milltown More	241	Middlethird	Mora	Cashel
Milltown St. John	403	Middlethird	Cooleagh	Cashel
Minorstown	235	Iffa and Offa East	Kilsheelan	Clonmel
Moan Beg	62	Middlethird	Fethard	Cashel
Moanbarron	73	Middlethird	Kiltinan	Clonmel
Moanbeg	26	Upper Ormond	Nenagh	Nenagh
Moancrea	328	Iffa and Offa West	Neddans	Clogheen
Moandoherdagh	212	Clanwilliam	Donohill	Tipperary
Moanfin	309	Upper Ormond	Kilruane	Nenagh
Moangarriff	125	Iffa and Offa East	Kilgrant	Clonmel
Moankeenane	243	Kilnamanagh Upper	Glenkeen	Thurles
Moanmehill	72	Iffa and Offa East	Kilgrant	Clonmel
Moanmore	1,413	Clanwilliam	Emly	Tipperary
Moanmore	507	Clanwilliam	Solloghod-more	Tipperary
Moanmore	323	Iffa and Offa West	Tullaghmelan	Clogheen
Moanmore	16	Middlethird	Fethard	Cashel
Moanour	632	Clanwilliam	Clonbeg	Tipperary
Moanreagh	60	Clanwilliam	Clonpet	Tipperary
Moanreagh	54	Clanwilliam	Cordangan	Tipperary
Moanroe	191	Iffa and Offa East	Lisronagh	Clonmel
Moanteen	242	Clanwilliam	Relickmurry & Athassel	Tipperary
Moanvaun	540	Kilnamanagh Upper	Doon	Tipperary
Moanvaun	247	Kilnamanagh Upper	Toem	Tipperary
Moanvurrin	461	Middlethird	Drangan	Cashel
Moatabulcane	50	Clanwilliam	Templenoe	Tipperary
Moatquarter	388	Clanwilliam	Kilfeakle	Tipperary
Moatquarter	215	Ikerrin	Rathnaveoge	Roscrea
Moatquarter	93	Clanwilliam	Donohill	Tipperary
Mobarnan	536	Middlethird	Magorban	Cashel
Mocklershill	417	Middlethird	Magorban	Cashel
Mocklerstown	711	Middlethird	Colman	Cashel
Modeshil (Ayre)	1,032	Slievardagh	Modeshil	Callan
Modeshil (Sankey)	377	Slievardagh	Modeshil	Callan
Modreeny	255	Lower Ormond	Modreeny	Borrisokane
Mogh	292	Clanwilliam	Rathlynin	Tipperary
Mogland	180	Kilnamanagh Upper	Upperchurch	Thurles
Moglass	372	Slievardagh	Killenaule	Cashel
Moglass	49	Middlethird	Cooleagh	Cashel
Moher	592	Kilnamanagh Upper	Upperchurch	Thurles
Moher	98	Iffa and Offa West	Templetenny	Clogheen
Moher East	326	Kilnamanagh Upper	Toem	Tipperary
Moher West	36	Kilnamanagh Upper	Toem	Tipperary
Moheragh	1,340	Kilnamanagh Lower	Donohill	Tipperary
Mohober	959	Slievardagh	Lismalin	Callan
Moloughabbey	292	Iffa and Offa West	Molough	Clogheen
Moloughnewtown	272	Iffa and Offa West	Molough	Clogheen
Monacocka	69	Eliogarty	Thurles	Thurles
Monaderreen	652	Iffa and Offa West	Caher	Clogheen
Monadreela	120	Middlethird	St. Patricksrock	Cashel
Monagee	157	Middlethird	St. Patricksrock	Cashel
Monaincha	1,778	Ikerrin	Corbally	Roscrea
Monakeeba	165	Eliogarty	Thurles	Thurles
Monaloughra	156	Iffa and Offa West	Shanrahan	Clogheen
Monalumpera	110	Middlethird	Ardmayle	Cashel
Monameagh	258	Middlethird	St. Patricksrock	Cashel
Monamoe	314	Eliogarty	Holycross	Thurles
Monanearla	65	Eliogarty	Thurles	Thurles
Monanore	426	Upper Ormond	Aghnameadle	Nenagh
Monaquill	416	Upper Ormond	Kilnaneave	Nenagh
Monaraha	187	Iffa and Offa West	Caher	Clogheen
Monaraheen	181	Eliogarty	Twomileborris	Thurles
Monard	313	Clanwilliam	Solloghod-more	Tipperary
Monaroan	325	Upper Ormond	Kilmore	Nenagh
Monatierna	83	Eliogarty	Twomileborris	Thurles
Monatogher	74	Clanwilliam	Solloghod-more	Tipperary
Monearmore	42	Clanwilliam	Cullen	Tipperary
Moneydass	130	Eliogarty	Ballycahill	Thurles
Moneynaboola	896	Clanwilliam	Clonbeg	Tipperary
Moneypark	40	Middlethird	Fethard	Cashel
Monksgrange	415	Iffa and Offa East	Inishlounaght	Clogheen
Monkstown	94	Iffa and Offa East	Inishlounaght	Clonmel
Monkstown	13	Iffa and Offa East	Kiltegan	Clonmel
Monroe	411	Owney and Arra	Youghalarra	Nenagh
Monroe	138	Middlethird	Barrettsgrange	Cashel
Monroe	114	Kilnamanagh Lower	Clonoulty	Cashel
Monroe	85	Iffa and Offa West	Tubbrid	Clogheen
Monroe	63	Eliogarty	Inch	Thurles
Monroe East	228	Iffa and Offa West	Ballybacon	Clogheen
Monroe West	76	Iffa and Offa West	Ballybacon	Clogheen
Monsea	642	Lower Ormond	Monsea	Nenagh
Monslatt	192	Slievardagh	Killenaule	Cashel
Montanavoe	91	Clanwilliam	Templeneiry	Tipperary
Montore	264	Ikerrin	Rathnaveoge	Roscrea
Moor	4	Middlethird	St. Patricksrock	Cashel
Moorabbey	225	Clanwilliam	Clonbeg	Tipperary
Mooresfort	805	Clanwilliam	Lattin	Tipperary
Moorstown	632	Middlethird	Mora	Cashel
Moorstown	507	Iffa and Offa East	Inishlounaght	Clonmel
Moorstown	133	Iffa and Offa East	Caher	Clonmel
Moortown	108	Iffa and Offa East	Kilgrant	Clonmel
Mortlestown	325	Iffa and Offa West	Mortlestown	Clogheen
Mortlestown Little	54	Iffa and Offa West	Mortlestown	Clogheen
Mortle-town	754	Middlethird	Cooleagh	Cashel
Mota	201	Lower Ormond	Kilbarron	Borrisokane
Mountalt	32	Kilnamanagh Upper	Ballycahill	Thurles
Mountanglesby	971	Iffa and Offa West	Shanrahan	Clogheen
Mountaylor	109	Slievardagh	Killenaule	Cashel
Mountcatherine	50	Eliogarty	Inch	Thurles
Mountfalcon	432	Lower Ormond	Ardcrony	Borrisokane
Mountfrisco	174	Ikerrin	Bourney	Roscrea
Mountgeorge	25	Kilnamanagh Upper	Glenkeen	Thurles
Mountisland	193	Upper Ormond	Kilmore	Nenagh
Mountjudkin	49	Middlethird	St. Patricksrock	Cashel
Mountphilips	259	Owney and Arra	Kilvellane	Nenagh
Mountrivers	23	Owney and Arra	Kilvellane	Nenagh
Mountsack	98	Owney and Arra	Burgesbeg	Nenagh
Mountsion	25	Kilnamanagh Upper	Ballycahill	Thurles
Mountwilliam	92	Clanwilliam	Kilfeakle	Tipperary
Moyaliff	1,207	Kilnamanagh Upper	Moyaliff	Thurles
Moycarky	518	Eliogarty	Moycarky	Thurles
**Moyne**	Town	Eliogarty	Moyne	Thurles
Moyne	269	Middlethird	Magowry	Cashel
Moyneard	711	Eliogarty	Moyne	Thurles
Moynetemple	416	Eliogarty	Moyne	Thurles
Moyroe	51	Lower Ormond	Nenagh	Nenagh
Mucklin	487	Upper Ormond	Kilmore	Nenagh
Muckloon	246	Lower Ormond	Terryglass	Borrisokane
Muckloonmodderee	721	Lower Ormond	Terryglass	Borrisokane
Mullagh	451	Iffa and Offa East	Kilmurry	Carrick on Suir
Mullaghnoney	119	Iffa and Offa East	Newchapel	Clonmel
Mullaunbrack	240	Eliogarty	Thurles	Thurles
Mullauns	212	Eliogarty	Thurles	Thurles
Mullenaranky	423	Iffa and Offa East	Lisronagh	Clonmel
Mullenkeagh	75	Lower Ormond	Modreeny	Borrisokane
**Mullinahone**	Town	Slievardagh	Kilvemnon	Callan
Mullinahone	199	Slievardagh	Kilvemnon	Callan
Mullinoly	203	Slievardagh	Kilvemnon	Callan
Munlusk	326	Lower Ormond	Aglishcloghane	Borrisokane
Munnia	381	Owney and Arra	Killoscully	Nenagh
Munnia	154	Lower Ormond	Ballingarry	Borrisokane
Murgasty	151	Clanwilliam	Tipperary	Tipperary
Mylerstown	185	Iffa and Offa East	Kilgrant	Clonmel
Mylerstown	102	Iffa and Offa East	Newchapel	Clonmel
Neddans (Farran)	239	Iffa and Offa West	Neddans	Clogheen
Neddans (Nagle)	396	Iffa and Offa West	Neddans	Clogheen
**Nenagh**	Town	Upper Ormond	Nenagh	Nenagh
**Nenagh**	Town	Lower Ormond	Nenagh	Nenagh
Nenagh North	776	Lower Ormond	Nenagh	Nenagh
Nenagh South	64	Upper Ormond	Nenagh	Nenagh
**New Birmingham**	Town	Slievardagh	Kilcooly	Urlingford
Newbrook	82	Eliogarty	Galbooly	Thurles
**Newcastle**	Town	Iffa and Offa West	Newcastle	Clogheen
Newcastle	162	Iffa and Offa West	Templetenny	Clogheen
Newchapel	233	Iffa and Offa East	Newchapel	Clonmel
Newhall	105	Slievardagh	Kilcooly	Urlingford
Newhill	636	Eliogarty	Twomileborris	Thurles
**Newinn**	Town	Middlethird	Knockgraffon	Cashel
Newlawn	300	Lower Ormond	Terryglass	Borrisokane
Newpark	667	Middlethird	Ballysheehan	Cashel
Newpark	307	Slievardagh	Kilcooly	Urlingford
**Newport**	Town	Owney and Arra	Kilvellane	Nenagh
Newport	303	Owney and Arra	Kilvellane	Nenagh
Newross	299	Owney and Arra	Kilnarath	Nenagh
Newtown	405	Clanwilliam	Clonbeg	Tipperary
Newtown	352	Owney and Arra	Youghalarra	Nenagh
Newtown	313	Middlethird	Erry	Cashel
Newtown	303	Eliogarty	Holycross	Thurles
Newtown	259	Owney and Arra	Templeachally	Nenagh
Newtown	212	Clanwilliam	Solloghod-beg	Tipperary
Newtown	189	Lower Ormond	Dorrha	Parsonstown
Newtown	160	Eliogarty	Ballymurreen	Thurles
Newtown	159	Middlethird	Knockgraffon	Cashel
Newtown	158	Ikerrin	Corbally	Roscrea
Newtown	156	Iffa and Offa East	Killaloan	Clonmel
Newtown	150	Upper Ormond	Ballymackey	Nenagh
Newtown	107	Middlethird	Baptistgrange	Cashel
Newtown	105	Ikerrin	Bourney	Roscrea
Newtown	99	Kilnamanagh Upper	Ballycahill	Thurles
Newtown	63	Kilnamanagh Upper	Templebeg	Thurles
Newtown	56	Kilnamanagh Lower	Aghacrew	Tipperary
Newtown (Guest)	212	Lower Ormond	Modreeny	Borrisokane
Newtown (Hodgins)	198	Lower Ormond	Modreeny	Borrisokane
Newtown Lower	380	Iffa and Offa East	Newtownlennan	Carrick on Suir
Newtown North	281	Kilnamanagh Lower	Donohill	Tipperary
Newtown South	47	Kilnamanagh Lower	Donohill	Tipperary
Newtown Upper	277	Iffa and Offa East	Newtownlennan	Carrick on Suir
Newtownadam	327	Iffa and Offa West	Caher	Clogheen
Newtownanner Demesne	227	Iffa and Offa East	Kilsheelan	Clonmel
Newtowndrangan	784	Middlethird	Drangan	Cashel
Nicholastown	426	Iffa and Offa West	Derrygrath	Clogheen
Nickeres	80	Clanwilliam	Emly	Tipperary
**Ninemilehouse**	Town	Slievardagh	Templemichael	Callan
**Ninemilehouse**	Town	Slievardagh	Grangemockler	Carrick on Suir
Ninemilehouse	57	Slievardagh	Templemichael	Callan
Noan	931	Slievardagh	Graystown	Cashel
Noard	1,017	Eliogarty	Twomileborris	Thurles
Nodstown North	22	Middlethird	Ardmayle	Cashel
Nodstown South	168	Middlethird	Ardmayle	Cashel
Nodstown.	995	Middlethird	Ardmayle	Cashel
Oakhampton	386	Owney and Arra	Kilnarath	Nenagh
Oldcastle	503	Ikerrin	Bourney	Roscrea
Oldcastle	339	Kilnamanagh Upper	Toem	Tipperary
Oldcastle	77	Slievardagh	Newtownlennan	Carrick on Suir
Oldcourt	455	Lower Ormond	Finnoe	Borrisokane
Oldgrange	190	Iffa and Offa West	Tullaghmelan	Clogheen
Oldtown	354	Eliogarty	Templemore	Thurles
Ollatrim	47	Upper Ormond	Aghnameadle	Nenagh
O'Meara's Acres	75	Lower Ormond	Kilbarron	Borrisokane
Orchardstown East	135	Iffa and Offa East	Newchapel	Clonmel
Orchardstown West	220	Iffa and Offa East	Newchapel	Clonmel
Orkneys	91	Ikerrin	Bourney	Roscrea
Outeragh	1,033	Middlethird	Outeragh	Cashel
Owens & Bigg's-Lot	143	Middlethird	St. Johnbaptist	Cashel
Oxpark	217	Lower Ormond	Modreeny	Borrisokane
Paddock	37	Kilnamanagh Upper	Glenkeen	Thurles
Pallas	370	Clanwilliam	Donohill	Tipperary
Pallas	141	Lower Ormond	Loughkeen	Parsonstown
Pallas Beg	239	Owney and Arra	Youghalarra	Nenagh
Pallas East	151	Upper Ormond	Templedowney	Nenagh
Pallas Lower	314	Kilnamanagh Upper	Glenkeen	Thurles
Pallas More	578	Owney and Arra	Youghalarra	Nenagh
Pallas Upper	367	Kilnamanagh Upper	Glenkeen	Thurles
Pallas West	184	Upper Ormond	Templedowney	Nenagh
Pallashill	417	Eliogarty	Inch	Thurles
Palmer's-hill	56	Middlethird	St. Patricksrock	Cashel
Park	436	Ikerrin	Killea	Roscrea
Park	315	Iffa and Offa West	Tullaghmelan	Clogheen
Park	312	Upper Ormond	Aghnameadle	Nenagh
Park	173	Upper Ormond	Ballymackey	Nenagh
Parkaderreen	61	Iffa and Offa West	Tubbrid	Clogheen
Parkaderreen	40	Iffa and Offa West	Shanrahan	Clogheen
Parkbeg	17	Owney and Arra	Youghalarra	Nenagh
Parkboy	169	Lower Ormond	Cloghprior	Borrisokane
Parkmore	338	Ikerrin	Roscrea	Roscrea
Parknascaddane	16	Iffa and Offa East	Kiltegan	Clonmel
Parkroe	199	Kilnamanagh Upper	Toem	Tipperary
Parkstown	624	Eliogarty	Ballymurreen	Thurles
Parkville	70	Iffa and Offa East	Rathronan	Clonmel
Patrickswell	330	Iffa and Offa East	Inishlounaght	Clonmel
Patrickswell	121	Owney and Arra	Burgesbeg	Nenagh
Peahill	73	Iffa and Offa West	Whitechurch	Clogheen
Peake	257	Middlethird	Ballysheehan	Cashel
Pegsborough	37	Clanwilliam	Tipperary	Tipperary
Penane	172	Eliogarty	Loughmoe East	Thurles
Pennefatherswood	195	Kilnamanagh Upper	Moyaliff	Thurles
Peppardstowne	201	Middlethird	Peppardstown	Cashel
Persse's-lot	136	Clanwilliam	Relickmurry & Athassel	Tipperary
Philipston	431	Kilnamanagh Lower	Donohill	Tipperary
Piercetown	320	Eliogarty	Rahelty	Thurles
Piercetown	273	Kilnamanagh Lower	Clonoulty	Cashel
Pigeonpark	30	Middlethird	St. Patricksrock	Cashel
Pintown	173	Ikerrin	Roscrea	Roscrea
Piperhill	382	Kilnamanagh Upper	Toem	Tipperary
Ploverhill	66	Lower Ormond	Lorrha	Borrisokane
Pollagh	274	Eliogarty	Inch	Thurles
Pollagh	133	Owney and Arra	Kilcomenty	Nenagh
Pollagh	133	Clanwilliam	Templeneiry	Tipperary
Pollagh	81	Owney and Arra	Kilvellane	Nenagh
Pollagh (Blunden)	79	Slievardagh	Kilvemnon	Callan
Pollagh (Pennefather)	30	Slievardagh	Kilvemnon	Callan
Pollanorman	433	Upper Ormond	Ballynaclogh	Nenagh
Pollanorman	283	Upper Ormond	Dolla	Nenagh
Portland	1,048	Lower Ormond	Lorrha	Borrisokane
Portland Island	64	Lower Ormond	Lorrha	Borrisokane
Portland Little	482	Lower Ormond	Lorrha	Borrisokane
**Portroe**	Town	Owney and Arra	Castletownarra	Nenagh
Poulacapple East	747	Slievardagh	Kilvemnon	Callan
Poulacapple West	769	Slievardagh	Kilvemnon	Callan
Poulaculleare	395	Iffa and Offa West	Whitechurch	Clogheen
Poulakerry	291	Iffa and Offa East	Kilsheelan	Clonmel
Poulakerry	273	Upper Ormond	Kilkeary	Nenagh
Poulatar	162	Iffa and Offa West	Ballybacon	Clogheen
Poulavala	289	Iffa and Offa West	Tubbrid	Clogheen
Pouldine	120	Eliogarty	Moycarky	Thurles
Poulmaleen	380	Iffa and Offa East	Newtownlennan	Carrick on Suir
Powerstown	133	Iffa and Offa East	Kilgrant	Clonmel
Powerstown Demesne	141	Iffa and Offa East	St. Mary's, Clonmel	Clonmel
Powerstown Demesne	110	Iffa and Offa East	Kilgrant	Clonmel
Poyntstown	571	Slievardagh	Fennor	Urlingford
Poyntstown	170	Slievardagh	Buolick	Urlingford
Price's-lot	454	Middlethird	St. Johnbaptist	Cashel
Priesttown	457	Iffa and Offa West	Newcastle	Clogheen
Priesttown	124	Middlethird	Drangan	Cashel
Priesttown Demesne	335	Middlethird	Drangan	Cashel
Priorpark	207	Lower Ormond	Cloghprior	Borrisokane
Priorstown	217	Iffa and Offa East	Killaloan	Clonmel
Priory Demesne	288	Eliogarty	Templemore	Thurles
Prospect	196	Middlethird	Drangan	Cashel
Prospect	174	Middlethird	Rathcool	Cashel
Prospect East	189	Lower Ormond	Cloghprior	Nenagh
Prospect West	207	Lower Ormond	Cloghprior	Nenagh
Pubblehill	128	Clanwilliam	Oughterleague	Tipperary
**Puckaun**	Town	Lower Ormond	Killodiernan	Nenagh
Puddingfield	172	Clanwilliam	Kilshane	Tipperary
Quakerstown	370	Lower Ormond	Ballingarry	Borrisokane
Quartercross	225	Middlethird	Coolmundry	Cashel
Racecourse	186	Eliogarty	Thurles	Thurles
Racecourse	171	Middlethird	St. Johnbaptist	Cashel
Racecourse Demesne	150	Middlethird	St. Johnbaptist	Cashel
Rackethall	229	Ikerrin	Corbally	Roscrea
Rahaniskey	89	Iffa and Offa East	Newchapel	Clonmel
Raheen	563	Iffa and Offa West	Caher	Clogheen
Raheen	247	Eliogarty	Holycross	Thurles
Raheen	200	Clanwilliam	Clonbullogue	Tipperary
Raheen	150	Iffa and Offa West	Ballybacon	Clogheen
Raheen	94	Slievardagh	Garrangibbon	Carrick on Suir
Raheen	93	Middlethird	Ballysheehan	Cashel
Raheen	63	Slievardagh	Kilvemnon	Callan
Raheen Lower	123	Clanwilliam	Solloghod-beg	Tipperary
Raheen Upper	123	Clanwilliam	Solloghod-beg	Tipperary
Raheenroe	185	Iffa and Offa West	Shanrahan	Clogheen
Raheenroe	25	Middlethird	Coolmundry	Cashel
Raheens	30	Ikerrin	Roscrea	Roscrea
Rahelty	819	Eliogarty	Rahelty	Thurles
Rahheenballindoney	154	Iffa and Offa West	Ardfinnan	Clogheen
Rahinaghmore	84	Middlethird	Knockgraffon	Cashel
Rahinane	280	Lower Ormond	Ballingarry	Borrisokane
Rahinane	24	Lower Ormond	Uskane	Borrisokane
Rahinch	183	Eliogarty	Ballymurreen	Thurles
Rahone	57	Lower Ormond	Cloghprior	Borrisokane
Rahyvira	88	Kilnamanagh Lower	Donohill	Tipperary
Railstown	408	Middlethird	Railstown	Cashel
Railstown	125	Middlethird	Kilconnell	Cashel
Railstown	96	Middlethird	Kilbragh	Cashel
Ranacrohy	149	Clanwilliam	Templenoe	Tipperary
Ranacrohy	16	Clanwilliam	Kilmucklin	Tipperary
Rapla	93	Upper Ormond	Kilruane	Nenagh
Rapla North	163	Upper Ormond	Kilruane	Nenagh
Rapla South	417	Upper Ormond	Kilruane	Nenagh
Rath	169	Lower Ormond	Dorrha	Parsonstown
Rathanny	154	Clanwilliam	Cordangan	Tipperary
Rathanure	114	Upper Ormond	Templederry	Nenagh
Rathard	115	Iffa and Offa West	Mortlestown	Clogheen
Rathavin	170	Middlethird	Rathcool	Cashel
Rathbeg	648	Slievardagh	Fennor	Urlingford
Rathbrit	315	Middlethird	Kilconnell	Cashel
Rathcardan	164	Kilnamanagh Upper	Glenkeen	Thurles
Rathclarish	314	Iffa and Offa East	Kilmurry	Carrick on Suir
Rathclogh North	162	Middlethird	Ballysheehan	Cashel
Rathclogh South	172	Middlethird	Ballysheehan	Cashel
Rathcloheen	365	Clanwilliam	Relickmurry & Athassel	Tipperary
Rathcool	364	Middlethird	Rathcool	Cashel
Rathcooney	27	Eliogarty	Thurles	Thurles
Rathcoun	318	Middlethird	St. Patricksrock	Cashel
Rathcriddoge	220	Eliogarty	Rahelty	Thurles
Rathcunikeen	160	Eliogarty	Ballymurreen	Thurles
Rathdermot	119	Clanwilliam	Templeneiry	Tipperary
Rathdrum	236	Middlethird	Colman	Cashel
Rathduff	105	Clanwilliam	Relickmurry & Athassel	Tipperary
Rathduff	74	Clanwilliam	Cullen	Tipperary
Rathduff	71	Clanwilliam	Kilfeakle	Tipperary
Rathduff Lower	22	Iffa and Offa East	Rathronan	Clonmel
Rathduff Upper	50	Iffa and Offa East	Rathronan	Clonmel
Rathfalla	285	Upper Ormond	Lisbunny	Nenagh
Rathgallen	351	Clanwilliam	Relickmurry & Athassel	Tipperary
Rathkea	282	Clanwilliam	Bruis	Tipperary
Rathkeevin	481	Iffa and Offa East	Rathronan	Clonmel
Rathkennan	699	Kilnamanagh Lower	Rathkennan	Cashel
Rathkennanwood	86	Kilnamanagh Lower	Rathkennan	Cashel
Rathkenny	1,075	Middlethird	Peppardstown	Cashel
Rathkenty	201	Middlethird	Kiltinan	Cashel
Rathleasty	382	Eliogarty	Drom	Thurles
Rathloose	80	Iffa and Offa East	Kilgrant	Clonmel
Rathmacarty East	86	Middlethird	Kilbragh	Cashel
Rathmacarty West	177	Middlethird	Kilbragh	Cashel
Rathmanna	240	Eliogarty	Twomileborris	Thurles
Rathmanna	45	Eliogarty	Rahelty	Thurles
Rathmooley	288	Slievardagh	Killenaule	Cashel
Rathmor	456	Kilnamanagh Upper	Glenkeen	Thurles
Rathmore	372	Lower Ormond	Borrisokane	Borrisokane
Rathmore	120	Iffa and Offa West	Caher	Clogheen
Rathnaleen South	327	Upper Ormond	Lisbunny	Nenagh
Rathnalour	79	Iffa and Offa East	Newchapel	Clonmel
Rathnasliggeen	120	Iffa and Offa East	Kiltegan	Clonmel
Rathnasveoge Upper	428	Ikerrin	Rathnaveoge	Roscrea
Rathnaveoge Lower	520	Ikerrin	Rathnaveoge	Roscrea
Rathneaveen (Ormond)	148	Clanwilliam	Tipperary	Tipperary
Rathneaveen (Ryan)	195	Clanwilliam	Tipperary	Tipperary
Rathokelly	207	Iffa and Offa West	Molough	Clogheen
Rathokelly	35	Iffa and Offa West	Neddans	Clogheen
Rathordan	842	Middlethird	St. Patricksrock	Cashel
Rathroe	137	Slievardagh	Killenaule	Cashel
Rathronan	395	Iffa and Offa East	Rathronan	Clonmel
Rathronan Desmesne	256	Iffa and Offa East	Rathronan	Clonmel
Rathsallagh	368	Middlethird	Tullamain	Cashel
Rathsasseragh	59	Clanwilliam	Corroge	Tipperary
Rathurles	291	Upper Ormond	Kilruane	Nenagh
Rathurles Commonage	19	Upper Ormond	Kilruane	Nenagh
Rathwalter	28	Iffa and Offa West	Tullaghmelan	Clogheen
Reafadda	837	Kilnamanagh Upper	Toem	Tipperary
Reagoulane	179	Kilnamanagh Upper	Toem	Tipperary
Reardnogy Beg	434	Owney and Arra	Abington	Nenagh
Reardnogy More	682	Owney and Arra	Abington	Nenagh
Rearoe	698	Iffa and Offa West	Shanrahan	Clogheen
Reaskavalla	92	Clanwilliam	Solloghod-more	Tipperary
Redcity	453	Middlethird	Redcity	Cashel
Reddanswalk	229	Clanwilliam	Templenoe	Tipperary
Redmondstown	403	Iffa and Offa East	Kilgrant	Clonmel
Redwood	3,003	Lower Ormond	Dorrha	Parsonstown
Redwood	1,537	Lower Ormond	Lorrha	Parsonstown
Reechestown	198	Iffa and Offa West	Rochestown	Clogheen
Regaile	174	Middlethird	Gaile	Cashel
Rehill	789	Iffa and Offa West	Shanrahan	Clogheen
Rehill	13	Iffa and Offa West	Tubbrid	Clogheen
Reisk	832	Kilnamanagh Upper	Upperchurch	Thurles
Renaghmore	364	Slievardagh	Kilcooly	Urlingford
Richmond	339	Lower Ormond	Monsea	Nenagh
Ringroe	250	Lower Ormond	Ardcrony	Borrisokane
Riverlawn	71	Upper Ormond	Ballymackey	Nenagh
**Riverstown**	Town	Lower Ormond	Loughkeen	Parsonstown
Roan	272	Slievardagh	Killenaule	Cashel
Roan	119	Kilnamanagh Upper	Upperchurch	Thurles
Rochestown	633	Iffa and Offa West	Rochestown	Clogheen
Rocker	125	Eliogarty	Loughmoe West	Thurles
Rockforest	830	Ikerrin	Corbally	Roscrea
Rocklow	81	Middlethird	Rathcool	Cashel
Rockvale	66	Owney and Arra	Kilnarath	Nenagh
Rockview	241	Lower Ormond	Dorrha	Parsonstown
Rockview	121	Slievardagh	Templemichael	Callan
Rockview	119	Lower Ormond	Knigh	Nenagh
Rockwell	338	Middlethird	Knockgraffon	Cashel
Rodeen Lower	263	Lower Ormond	Finnoe	Borrisokane
Rodeen Upper	207	Lower Ormond	Finnoe	Borrisokane
Roden	351	Lower Ormond	Dorrha	Parsonstown
Rodus	85	Clanwilliam	Emly	Tipperary
Roebuck's-land	123	Middlethird	Coolmundry	Cashel
Roegarraun	187	Lower Ormond	Terryglass	Borrisokane
Roolagh	158	Owney and Arra	Templeachally	Nenagh
Roosca (Burke)	323	Iffa and Offa West	Tubbrid	Clogheen
Roosca (Hickey)	194	Iffa and Offa West	Tubbrid	Clogheen
Roosca (Miles)	106	Iffa and Offa West	Tubbrid	Clogheen
Rootagh	163	Owney and Arra	Kilnarath	Nenagh
Roran	499	Lower Ormond	Terryglass	Borrisokane
Roran	287	Owney and Arra	Templeachally	Nenagh
Rorardstown Lower	291	Eliogarty	Drom	Thurles
Rorardstown Upper	245	Eliogarty	Drom	Thurles
**Roscrea**	Town	Ikerrin	Roscrea	Roscrea
Roseborough	337	Clanwilliam	Tipperary	Tipperary
Rosegreen	350	Middlethird	Tullamain	Cashel
Rosgoordagh	127	Upper Ormond	Aghnameadle	Nenagh
Roskeen	875	Kilnamanagh Upper	Moyaliff	Thurles
Roskeen Little	9	Kilnamanagh Upper	Moyaliff	Thurles
Roskeen North	13	Kilnamanagh Upper	Moyaliff	Thurles
Roskeen South	4	Kilnamanagh Upper	Moyaliff	Thurles
Rosmult	360	Kilnamanagh Upper	Moyaliff	Thurles
Rosnacananee	107	Kilnamanagh Upper	Moyaliff	Thurles
Rosnamulteeny	244	Kilnamanagh Upper	Glenkeen	Thurles
Ross	241	Lower Ormond	Dorrha	Parsonstown
Ross	132	Clanwilliam	Kilfeakle	Tipperary
Rossacrow	193	Kilnamanagh Lower	Aghacrew	Tipperary
Rossacrow	91	Kilnamanagh Lower	Donohill	Tipperary
Rossadrehid	2,690	Clanwilliam	Templeneiry	Tipperary
Rossaguile	305	Owney and Arra	Kilnarath	Nenagh
Rossaguile	89	Owney and Arra	Killoscully	Nenagh
Rossane	165	Slievardagh	Kilvemnon	Callan
Rossary Beg	79	Owney and Arra	Kilvellane	Nenagh
Rossary More	129	Owney and Arra	Kilvellane	Nenagh
Rossbeg	88	Kilnamanagh Lower	Kilpatrick	Cashel
Rossbog	938	Clanwilliam	Clonbeg	Tipperary
Rossestown	587	Eliogarty	Shyane	Thurles
Rossfinch	413	Owney and Arra	Kilnarath	Nenagh
Rossmore	475	Kilnamanagh Lower	Clonoulty	Cashel
Rossmore	383	Iffa and Offa West	Newcastle	Clogheen
Rossnamanniff Lower	55	Eliogarty	Templemore	Thurles
Rossnamanniff Upper	44	Eliogarty	Templemore	Thurles
Rossoulty	312	Kilnamanagh Upper	Templebeg	Thurles
Rossrehill	149	Iffa and Offa West	Tubbrid	Clogheen
Rossrehill	7	Iffa and Offa West	Shanrahan	Clogheen
Roughan	138	Lower Ormond	Dorrha	Parsonstown
Roxborough	189	Iffa and Offa West	Tullaghmelan	Clogheen
Rusheen Beg	232	Kilnamanagh Upper	Glenkeen	Thurles
Rusheen More	289	Kilnamanagh Upper	Glenkeen	Thurles
Russelstown	215	Clanwilliam	Solloghod-more	Tipperary
Ryninch Lower	102	Owney and Arra	Templeachally	Nenagh
Ryninch Upper	475	Owney and Arra	Templeachally	Nenagh
Sadleirswells	383	Clanwilliam	Tipperary	Tipperary
Sallsquarter	116	Middlethird	Gaile	Cashel
Sallybog	204	Slievardagh	Kilcooly	Urlingford
Sallypark	199	Upper Ormond	Latteragh	Nenagh
Sandymount	50	Eliogarty	Templemore	Thurles
Saucestown	246	Middlethird	Peppardstown	Cashel
Saucestown	96	Middlethird	Rathcool	Cashel
Scalaheen	105	Clanwilliam	Cordangan	Tipperary
Scarragh	77	Lower Ormond	Kilbarron	Borrisokane
Scarrough	332	Kilnamanagh Lower	Donohill	Tipperary
Scart	420	Iffa and Offa West	Tubbrid	Clogheen
Scart	177	Clanwilliam	Killardry	Tipperary
Scart	128	Ikerrin	Corbally	Roscrea
Scart East	174	Iffa and Offa West	Shanrahan	Clogheen
Scart West	192	Iffa and Offa West	Shanrahan	Clogheen
Scartana	337	Iffa and Offa West	Whitechurch	Clogheen
Scartbeg	20	Iffa and Offa West	Tubbrid	Clogheen
Scartnaglorane	1,700	Iffa and Offa West	Whitechurch	Clogheen
Scilly Island	4	Owney and Arra	Castletownarra	Nenagh
Scragg	432	Owney and Arra	Kilmastulla	Nenagh
Scraggaun	96	Middlethird	St. Johnbaptist	Cashel
Scraggeen	783	Owney and Arra	Kilvellane	Nenagh
Scriboge	59	Lower Ormond	Kilbarron	Borrisokane
Sedgemoor	56	Lower Ormond	Knigh	Nenagh
Sergeant's Lot	110	Clanwilliam	Relickmurry & Athassel	Tipperary
Seskin	975	Iffa and Offa East	Kilsheelan	Clonmel
Seskin	237	Clanwilliam	Solloghod-more	Tipperary
Seskin	228	Kilnamanagh Upper	Upperchurch	Thurles
Shallee (Coughlan)	687	Owney and Arra	Killoscully	Nenagh
Shallee (White)	424	Owney and Arra	Killoscully	Nenagh
Shallee Lower and Upper	487	Owney and Arra	Killoscully	Nenagh
Shanacloon	336	Ikerrin	Bourney	Roscrea
Shanacloon	296	Kilnamanagh Upper	Toem	Tipperary
Shanacloon	176	Eliogarty	Galbooly	Thurles
Shanakill	872	Ikerrin	Killavinoge	Roscrea
Shanakill Lower	155	Lower Ormond	Terryglass	Borrisokane
Shanakill Upper	157	Lower Ormond	Terryglass	Borrisokane
Shanaknock	193	Kilnamanagh Lower	Aghacrew	Tipperary
Shanaknock	51	Kilnamanagh Lower	Donohill	Tipperary
Shanakyle	288	Middlethird	Magowry	Cashel
Shanavally	94	Lower Ormond	Cloghprior	Borrisokane
Shanbally	618	Iffa and Offa East	Temple-etney	Clonmel
Shanbally	510	Iffa and Offa East	Lisronagh	Clonmel
Shanbally	371	Iffa and Offa West	Shanrahan	Clogheen
Shanbally	141	Upper Ormond	Ballymackey	Nenagh
Shanbally	107	Eliogarty	Moycarky	Thurles
Shanbally	85	Owney and Arra	Kilcomenty	Nenagh
Shanballyard	322	Iffa and Offa East	Inishlounaght	Clonmel
Shanballyard	157	Upper Ormond	Aghnameadle	Nenagh
Shanballycleary	10	Kilnamanagh Upper	Glenkeen	Thurles
Shanballyduff	663	Middlethird	Dangandargan	Cashel
Shanballyduff	341	Eliogarty	Rahelty	Thurles
Shanballyduff	306	Kilnamanagh Upper	Moyaliff	Thurles
Shanballymore	199	Clanwilliam	Kilmucklin	Tipperary
Shanballynahagh	170	Ikerrin	Bourney	Roscrea
Shanballyredmond	866	Owney and Arra	Abington	Nenagh
Shandangan	119	Clanwilliam	Donohill	Tipperary
Shangarry	1,156	Slievardagh	Mowney	Callan
Shannonhall	105	Lower Ormond	Dromineer	Nenagh
Shannonvale	180	Lower Ormond	Dromineer	Nenagh
Shanrahan	3,870	Iffa and Offa West	Shanrahan	Clogheen
Shanvally	138	Lower Ormond	Terryglass	Borrisokane
Sharragh	774	Lower Ormond	Dorrha	Parsonstown
Sheehane	73	Ikerrin	Roscrea	Roscrea
Sheelruddera	103	Lower Ormond	Terryglass	Borrisokane
Shesharoe	202	Owney and Arra	Castletownarra	Nenagh
Shesheraghkeale	291	Lower Ormond	Nenagh	Nenagh
Shesheraghmore	541	Lower Ormond	Borrisokane	Borrisokane
Shesheraghscanlan	115	Lower Ormond	Finnoe	Borrisokane
Sheskin	237	Eliogarty	Thurles	Thurles
Shevry	961	Kilnamanagh Upper	Upperchurch	Thurles
Shinganagh	72	Clanwilliam	Templeneiry	Tipperary
Shortcastle	65	Iffa and Offa West	Ardfinnan	Clogheen
Shortcastle	58	Iffa and Offa West	Mortlestown	Clogheen
Shower	644	Owney and Arra	Kilvellane	Nenagh
Shronell	99	Clanwilliam	Bruis	Tipperary
Shronell	50	Clanwilliam	Shronell	Tipperary
Shronell Beg	558	Clanwilliam	Shronell	Tipperary
Shronell More	155	Clanwilliam	Shronell	Tipperary
Shrough	494	Clanwilliam	Bruis	Tipperary
Silverfort	231	Middlethird	Magorban	Cashel
**Silvermines**	Town	Upper Ormond	Kilmore	Nenagh
Skeagh	44	Eliogarty	Loughmoe East	Thurles
Skehanagh	326	Ikerrin	Killavinoge	Roscrea
Skehanagh	250	Lower Ormond	Loughkeen	Parsonstown
Skehanagh	194	Kilnamanagh Lower	Clonoulty	Cashel
Skehanagh	70	Lower Ormond	Kilbarron	Borrisokane
Skehanagh	21	Iffa and Offa East	Kilsheelan	Clonmel
Skehanagh North	182	Ikerrin	Killea	Roscrea
Skehanagh South	73	Ikerrin	Killea	Roscrea
Skeheenaranky	3,024	Iffa and Offa West	Templetenny	Clogheen
Sladagh	141	Middlethird	Baptistgrange	Cashel
Slainstown North	154	Middlethird	Rathcool	Cashel
Slainstown South	14	Middlethird	Rathcool	Cashel
Slatefield	85	Middlethird	Ardmayle	Cashel
Slevoir	435	Lower Ormond	Terryglass	Borrisokane
Smithsfarm	18	Eliogarty	Moycarky	Thurles
Solloghodbeg	858	Clanwilliam	Solloghod-beg	Tipperary
Solsborough	148	Lower Ormond	Nenagh	Nenagh
Sopwell	1,113	Lower Ormond	Uskane	Borrisokane
Southhill	121	Upper Ormond	Kilruane	Nenagh
Spafield	76	Middlethird	St. Johnbaptist	Cashel
Spitalfield	21	Middlethird	Fethard	Cashel
Spital-land	26	Clanwilliam	Tipperary	Tipperary
Spital-land	15	Iffa and Offa West	Ardfinnan	Clogheen
Spital-land	8	Clanwilliam	Relickmurry & Athassel	Tipperary
Springfield	355	Middlethird	Knockgraffon	Cashel
Springfield	232	Lower Ormond	Finnoe	Borrisokane
Springfield	144	Slievardagh	Ballingarry	Callan
Springfield	118	Slievardagh	Kilcooly	Urlingford
Springfield	117	Clanwilliam	Tipperary	Tipperary
Springfield	101	Kilnamanagh Upper	Glenkeen	Thurles
Springfield Glebe	46	Lower Ormond	Finnoe	Borrisokane
Springhill	126	Slievardagh	Killenaule	Cashel
Springhill	44	Slievardagh	Graystown	Cashel
Springhouse	471	Clanwilliam	Kilshane	Tipperary
Springmount	128	Lower Ormond	Cloghprior	Borrisokane
Springmount	97	Clanwilliam	Relickmurry & Athassel	Tipperary
Springpark	112	Lower Ormond	Ballingarry	Borrisokane
Sraduff	342	Lower Ormond	Dorrha	Parsonstown
Sragh	190	Upper Ormond	Ballynaclogh	Nenagh
Sragh	134	Lower Ormond	Finnoe	Borrisokane
Sragh	74	Upper Ormond	Kilmore	Nenagh
Srahavarrella	373	Kilnamanagh Lower	Clonoulty	Cashel
Sruhane	33	Middlethird	Ardmayle	Cashel
St Domminicks Abbey	2	Middlethird	St. Patricksrock	Cashel
St Francisabbey	12	Middlethird	St. Johnbaptist	Cashel
St Johnstown	818	Middlethird	St. Johnstown	Cashel
St Patricksrock	162	Middlethird	St. Patricksrock	Cashel
Stangs	68	Upper Ormond	Kilmore	Nenagh
Stephenstown	164	Middlethird	St. Johnbaptist	Cashel
Stephenstownbeg	114	Middlethird	Railstown	Cashel
Stereame	77	Lower Ormond	Nenagh	Nenagh
Stillimity	37	Middlethird	Mora	Cashel
Stokaun	147	Clanwilliam	Templenoe	Tipperary
Stonepark	849	Clanwilliam	Clonbeg	Tipperary
Stonepark	49	Lower Ormond	Terryglass	Borrisokane
Stonepark	29	Middlethird	St. Johnbaptist	Cashel
Stonestown	85	Lower Ormond	Loughkeen	Parsonstown
Stoneyacre	400	Lower Ormond	Modreeny	Borrisokane
Stook	290	Upper Ormond	Aghnameadle	Nenagh
Stradavoher	94	Eliogarty	Thurles	Thurles
Strike Lower	100	Middlethird	Coolmundry	Cashel
Strike Upper	269	Middlethird	Coolmundry	Cashel
Strogue	712	Ikerrin	Templeree	Thurles
Suirville	256	Clanwilliam	Relickmurry & Athassel	Tipperary
Summerhill	382	Ikerrin	Rathnaveoge	Roscrea
Summerhill	151	Kilnamanagh Upper	Glenkeen	Thurles
Summerhill	64	Iffa and Offa East	Kiltegan	Clonmel
Suttonrath	204	Iffa and Offa West	Caher	Clogheen
Synone	620	Middlethird	Ballysheehan	Cashel
Tankerstown	249	Clanwilliam	Clonbullogue	Tipperary
Tannersrath	89	Iffa and Offa East	Kilgrant	Clonmel
Tarsna	236	Slievardagh	Crohane	Callan
Templederry	150	Upper Ormond	Templederry	Nenagh
Temple-etney	99	Iffa and Offa East	Temple-etney	Clonmel
Templemichael	183	Slievardagh	Templemichael	Carrick on Suir
**Templemore**	Town	Eliogarty	Templemore	Thurles
Templemore Demesne	386	Eliogarty	Templemore	Thurles
Templenahurney	592	Clanwilliam	Clonbullogue	Tipperary
Templenoe	366	Middlethird	Killeenasteena	Cashel
Templenoe	206	Clanwilliam	Templenoe	Tipperary
**Templetuohy**	Town	Ikerrin	Templetuohy	Thurles
Terryglass	577	Lower Ormond	Terryglass	Borrisokane
The Division	124	Upper Ormond	Kilmore	Nenagh
The Heath	103	Eliogarty	Thurles	Thurles
The Islands	28	Iffa and Offa East	Carrick	Carrick on Suir
The Sheehys	898	Ikerrin	Corbally	Roscrea
**Thomastown**	Town	Clanwilliam	Relickmurry & Athassel	Tipperary
Thomastown	174	Iffa and Offa West	Derrygrath	Clogheen
Thomastown Demesne	423	Clanwilliam	Relickmurry & Athassel	Tipperary
Thomastown Demesne Nth	419	Clanwilliam	Kilfeakle	Tipperary
Thomastown Demesne South	641	Clanwilliam	Kilfeakle	Tipperary
Thornhill	137	Owney and Arra	Kilcomenty	Nenagh
**Thurles**	Town	Eliogarty	Thurles	Thurles
Thurles Townparks	365	Eliogarty	Thurles	Thurles
Thurlesbeg	1,014	Middlethird	St. Patricksrock	Cashel
Tiermoyle	313	Upper Ormond	Aghnameadle	Nenagh
Timeighter	323	Ikerrin	Roscrea	Roscrea
Timoney	699	Ikerrin	Corbally	Roscrea
Timoney Hills	206	Ikerrin	Corbally	Roscrea
Tincurry	401	Iffa and Offa West	Whitechurch	Clogheen
Tinderry	427	Ikerrin	Corbally	Roscrea
Tinlough	404	Lower Ormond	Loughkeen	Parsonstown
Tinlough	265	Slievardagh	Grangemockler	Carrick on Suir
Tinnahinchy	118	Kilnamanagh Lower	Donohill	Tipperary
Tinnakilly	404	Lower Ormond	Loughkeen	Parsonstown
Tinnakilly	301	Middlethird	Peppardstown	Cashel
Tinnakilly	297	Middlethird	Cloneen	Cashel
Tinock	382	Slievardagh	Ballingarry	Callan
Tinvane	161	Iffa and Offa East	Carrick	Carrick on Suir
Tinvoher	1,087	Eliogarty	Loughmoe West	Thurles
**Tipperary**	Town	Clanwilliam	Cordangan	Tipperary
**Tipperary**	Town	Clanwilliam	Corroge	Tipperary
**Tipperary**	Town	Clanwilliam	Tipperary	Tipperary
Tipperary Hills	37	Clanwilliam	Tipperary	Tipperary
Tiroe	77	Slievardagh	Newtownlennan	Carrick on Suir
Tober	1,006	Middlethird	Cloneen	Cashel
Toberadora	577	Middlethird	Gaile	Cashel
**Toberaheena**	Town	Iffa and Offa East	Inishlounaght	Clonmel
Toberaheena	115	Iffa and Offa East	Inishlounaght	Clonmel
Toberaheena	83	Iffa and Offa East	Kiltegan	Clonmel
Tobindgarden	17	Upper Ormond	Latteragh	Nenagh
Toem	98	Kilnamanagh Upper	Toem	Tipperary
Togher	348	Ikerrin	Templetuohy	Thurles
Tombrickane	1,284	Lower Ormond	Borrisokane	Borrisokane
Tomona	111	Lower Ormond	Monsea	Nenagh
Tooloone	127	Middlethird	Knockgraffon	Cashel
**Toomyvara**	Town	Upper Ormond	Aghnameadle	Nenagh
Toor	1,026	Iffa and Offa East	Kilcash	Clonmel
Toor	275	Clanwilliam	Bruis	Tipperary
Toor	52	Owney and Arra	Youghalarra	Nenagh
Toor	48	Eliogarty	Thurles	Thurles
Toor Beg	337	Iffa and Offa West	Shanrahan	Clogheen
Toor More	286	Iffa and Offa West	Shanrahan	Clogheen
Toorataggart	144	Owney and Arra	Killoscully	Nenagh
Tooreagh	176	Upper Ormond	Templederry	Nenagh
Tooreen	202	Eliogarty	Thurles	Thurles
Tooreen	160	Clanwilliam	Clonbeg	Tipperary
Tooreen	148	Kilnamanagh Upper	Toem	Tipperary
Tooreen	131	Kilnamanagh Lower	Donohill	Cashel
Tooreen	112	Middlethird	Baptistgrange	Clonmel
Tooreen	67	Upper Ormond	Dolla	Nenagh
Tooreen	10	Kilnamanagh Lower	Kilpatrick	Cashel
Tooreenbrien Lower	253	Owney and Arra	Kilvellane	Nenagh
Tooreenbrien Upper	508	Owney and Arra	Kilvellane	Nenagh
Tooreencullinagh	83	Kilnamanagh Upper	Moyaliff	Thurles
Tooreigh	165	Upper Ormond	Ballymackey	Nenagh
Toorfiba	123	Kilnamanagh Upper	Upperchurch	Thurles
Toorfune	72	Owney and Arra	Burgesbeg	Nenagh
Toragh	365	Kilnamanagh Lower	Clonoulty	Cashel
Touknockane	55	Owney and Arra	Kilcomenty	Nenagh
Touloure	110	Iffa and Offa West	Ardfinnan	Clogheen
Tountinna	367	Owney and Arra	Templeachally	Nenagh
Toureen	978	Clanwilliam	Killardry	Tipperary
Town Lot	9	Clanwilliam	Tipperary	Tipperary
Townagha	139	Eliogarty	Rahelty	Thurles
Townfields	333	Lower Ormond	Modreeny	Borrisokane
Townlough Lower	200	Owney and Arra	Castletownarra	Nenagh
Townlough Upper	327	Owney and Arra	Castletownarra	Nenagh
Townparks	358	Iffa and Offa West	Caher	Clogheen
Townparks	222	Iffa and Offa East	Carrick	Carrick on Suir
Townparks	138	Ikerrin	Roscrea	Roscrea
Traverston	295	Upper Ormond	Dolla	Nenagh
Tubbrid	543	Iffa and Offa West	Tubbrid	Clogheen
Tulla	210	Clanwilliam	Emly	Tipperary
Tulla	167	Upper Ormond	Kilmore	Nenagh
Tullaghedy	569	Upper Ormond	Kilmore	Nenagh
Tullaghmelan	97	Iffa and Offa West	Tullaghmelan	Clogheen
Tullamain	998	Middlethird	Tullamain	Cashel
Tullamain	95	Middlethird	Kilbragh	Cashel
Tullamore	354	Owney and Arra	Monsea	Nenagh
Tullamoylin	234	Upper Ormond	Dolla	Nenagh
Tullamoylin	66	Upper Ormond	Ballynaclogh	Nenagh
Tullaskeagh	113	Ikerrin	Roscrea	Roscrea
Tullequane	104	Slievardagh	Lickfinn	Urlingford
Tullohea	578	Iffa and Offa East	Garrangibbon	Clonmel
Tullow	328	Iffa and Offa West	Ballybacon	Clogheen
Tullow	229	Owney and Arra	Kilvellane	Nenagh
Tullow	192	Middlethird	Kiltinan	Clonmel
Tullowcossaun	453	Middlethird	Cloneen	Cashel
Tullowmacjames	2,077	Ikerrin	Templetuohy	Thurles
Turavoggaun	334	Lower Ormond	Terryglass	Borrisokane
Turraheen Lower	1,153	Kilnamanagh Lower	Clogher	Cashel
Turraheen Upper	1,925	Kilnamanagh Lower	Clogher	Cashel
Turtulla	790	Eliogarty	Fertiana	Thurles
Turtulla	34	Eliogarty	Thurles	Thurles
Turtulla	28	Upper Ormond	Dolla	Nenagh
**Twomileborris**	Town	Eliogarty	Twomileborris	Thurles
Twomilebridge	185	Iffa and Offa East	Kilgrant	Clonmel
Tyone	298	Upper Ormond	Nenagh	Nenagh
Tyone	205	Upper Ormond	Lisbunny	Nenagh
Tyone	97	Upper Ormond	Ballynaclogh	Nenagh
Ummera	179	Upper Ormond	Ballymackey	Nenagh
Urard	1,043	Slievardagh	Fennor	Urlingford
Urra	618	Lower Ormond	Killodiernan	Borrisokane
Uskane	350	Lower Ormond	Uskane	Borrisokane
Verdanthill	39	Ikerrin	Corbally	Roscrea
Waller's-lot	153	Middlethird	St. Johnbaptist	Cashel
Walshpark	809	Lower Ormond	Dorrha	Parsonstown
Walshsbog	474	Middlethird	Kiltinan	Clonmel
Wellington	36	Lower Ormond	Knigh	Nenagh
Westonslot	46	Kilnamanagh Lower	Clonoulty	Cashel
Whitechurch	296	Iffa and Offa West	Whitechurch	Clogheen
Whitefield	616	Eliogarty	Loughmoe West	Thurles
Whitefort	142	Eliogarty	Holycross	Thurles
Whitehall	98	Lower Ormond	Ballingarry	Borrisokane
Whiteland	220	Middlethird	Outeragh	Cashel
Whitepark	164	Ikerrin	Roscrea	Roscrea
Whitstone	185	Lower Ormond	Ardcrony	Borrisokane
Williamstown	709	Slievardagh	Ballingarry	Callan
Willisson	79	Ikerrin	Roscrea	Roscrea
Willsborough	81	Lower Ormond	Ardcrony	Borrisokane
Wilton	93	Upper Ormond	Ballymackey	Nenagh
Windmill	299	Middlethird	St. Patricksrock	Cashel
Windygap	123	Upper Ormond	Dolla	Nenagh
Wingfield	176	Lower Ormond	Loughkeen	Parsonstown
Woodford	144	Kilnamanagh Lower	Clonoulty	Cashel
Woodhouse	303	Middlethird	Magorban	Cashel
Woodinstown	459	Middlethird	Knockgraffon	Cashel
Woodlands	50	Upper Ormond	Aghnameadle	Nenagh
Woodpark	204	Lower Ormond	Cloghprior	Borrisokane
Woodrooff	611	Iffa and Offa East	Inishlounaght	Clonmel
Woodrooff	277	Iffa and Offa West	Derrygrath	Clonmel
Woodrooff	135	Iffa and Offa East	Newchapel	Clonmel
Woodville	516	Upper Ormond	Ballymackey	Nenagh
Woodville	83	Eliogarty	Templemore	Thurles
Wrensborough	79	Eliogarty	Thurles	Thurles
Youghal	224	Owney and Arra	Youghalarra	Nenagh
Youghalvillage	267	Owney and Arra	Youghalarra	Nenagh
