= Newtown, Ormond Lower =

Townland (administrative area) in County Tipperary, Ireland

Newtown, Ormond Lower (Irish: An Baile Nua) is a townland in the historical Barony of Ormond Lower, County Tipperary, Ireland. It is located in the civil parish of Dorrha, west of Rathcabbin.

There are nineteen townlands known as Newtown in the whole of County Tipperary. There are three townlands with the name Newtown (An Baile Nua) in the barony of Ormond Lower, North Tipperary, Ireland however the others take a family name, in parentheses, to differentiate them. They are Newtown (Guest) and Newtown (Hodgins) both in the civil parish of Modreeny.
