= Drumnamahane Island =

Townland in County Tipperary, Ireland

Coordinates: 52.989809°N 8.065481°W

Drumnamahane Island (Irish: Oileán Dhromainn na Meathán) is a townland in the Barony of Ormond Lower, County Tipperary, Ireland. It is located in the civil parish of Uskane.

It is located roughly in the centre of the triangle formed by Borrisokane, Cloughjordan and Ballingarry. It is not an island surrounded by a body of water, rather it is surrounded by numerous small watercourses and marshy areas.

Scohaboy Bog (Móin na Scotha Buí in Irish), a large raised bog is partially within the townland. The large flat raised bog provides habitat for rare plants. The bog was declared a Natural Heritage Area in 2005. For centuries the bog was harvested for turf (peat) for use as fuel for domestic fires. There is evidence of drainage activity and fire damage.

A separate townland, Drumnamahane, is located immediately to the west of Drumnamahane Island.
