= Kilfadda =

Townland in County Tipperary, Ireland

Kilfadda (An Choill Fhada in Irish) is a townland in the Barony of Ormond Lower, County Tipperary, Ireland. It is located in the civil parish of Aglishcloghane close to the town of Borrisokane.

== Kilfadda Castle ==
The site of a now ruined 15th century towerhouse, Kilfadda Castle, stands within the townland.

The towerhouse was owned by a member of the O'Kennedy family in the 17th century, but was soon after passed to the O'Carrolls of Ely O’Carroll who held it until the early 19th century when it was abandoned.
