= Ballyfinboy =

Townland in County Tipperary, Ireland

Coordinates: 52.993°N 8.151°W

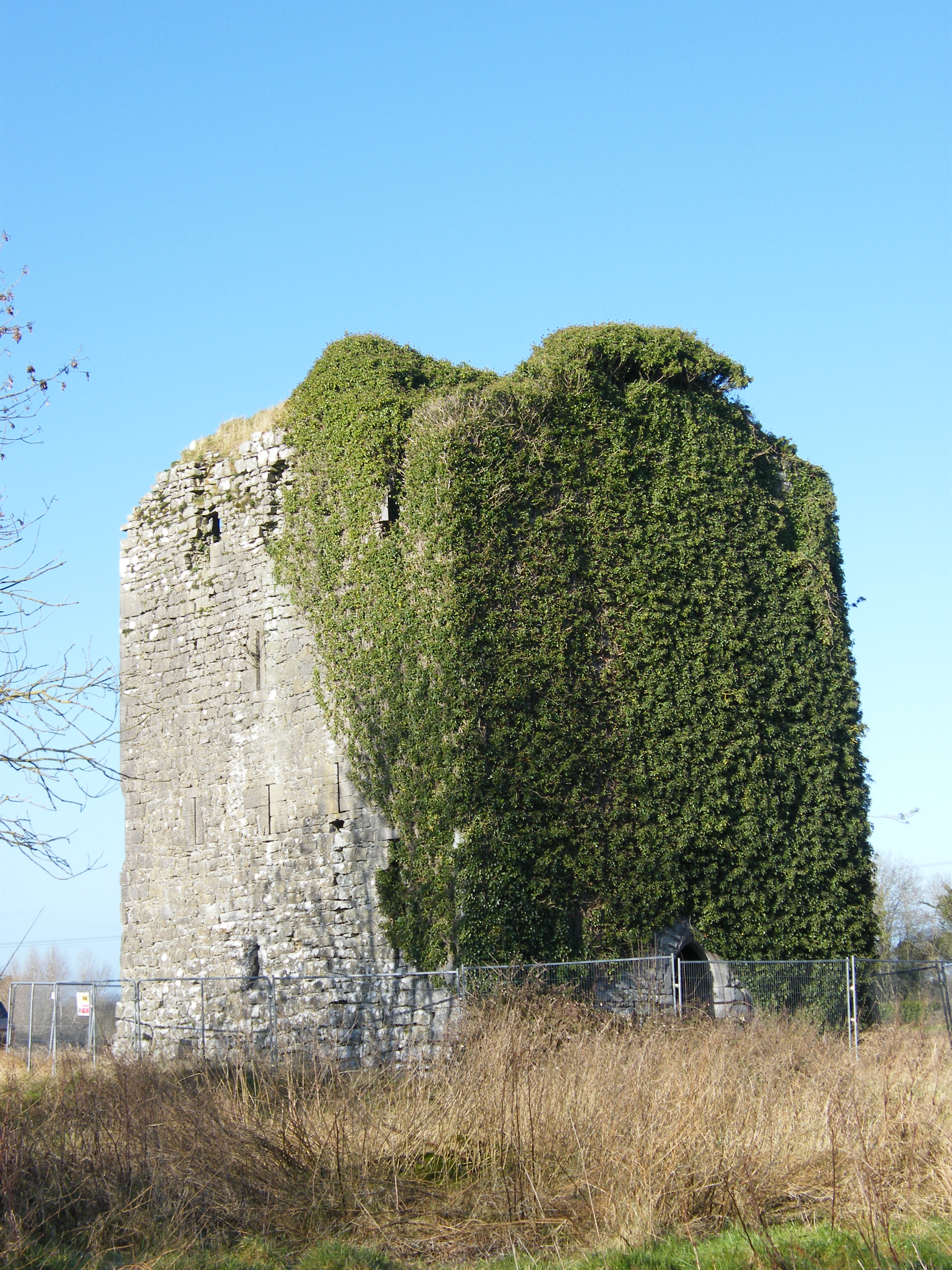
Ballyfinboy Castle

Ballyfinboy (Irish: Beal Átha Fionnmhaí) is a townland in the historical Barony of Ormond Lower, County Tipperary, Ireland. It is located between Borrisokane and Finnoe and shares its name with the Ballyfinboy River which flows by. Ballyfinboy Castle, a ruined tower house with a Sheela na gig on a panel on the western wall stands close to the river.
