= Derry, Dorrha =

Townland in County Tipperary, Ireland

Coordinates: 53.120309°N 8.039188°W

Derry (Doire in Irish) is a townland in the historical Barony of Ormond Lower, County Tipperary, Ireland. It is located west of Rathcabban in the civil parish of Dorrha in the north of the county.
