= Sopwell, County Tipperary =

Townland in County Tipperary, Ireland

Coordinates: 52°59′27″N 8°02′44″W

Sopwell (Coill na Lathach in Irish) is a townland in the historical Barony of Ormond Lower, County Tipperary, Ireland.

== Location ==
Sopwell is located east of the N52 road between Ballingarry, North Tipperary and Borrisokane.

== Places of note ==
Sopwell Hall a seven bay private house built around 1745. The house, outbuildings, stewart's house and gate lodges are listed on the National Inventory of Architectural Heritage as being of special interest.

The former Sopwell National school built in the 1820s of limestone has been listed as being of architectural, artistic and social interest. It is also listed as a protected structure by Tipperary County Council (RPS Refs S367).

Sopwell woods are a part of the scattered Borrisokane Forest managed by Coillte. Coillte supports a local community initiative to improve recreation facilities in Sopwell woods

Part of Scohaboy Bog, a raised bog with Natural Heritage Area protection, is located within the townland.
