= Newtown (Guest) =

Townland in County Tipperary, Ireland

Newtown (Guest) (Irish: An Baile Nua (Guest)) is a townland in the historical Barony of Ormond Lower, County Tipperary, Ireland. It is located in the civil parish of Modreeny on the south-east side of the R491 road between Cloughjordan and Shinrone. The family name Guest is written in parentheses in both English and Irish.
