= Garraunorish =

Townland in County Tipperary, Ireland

Garraunorish , (Irish: Garrán Fheorais) is a townland in the Barony of Ormond Lower in County Tipperary, Ireland. It is located in the civil parish of Modreeny towards Cloughjordan.

The woods at Garraunorish form a part of Borrisokane Forest which consists of several widely dispersed small areas of woodland managed by Coillte, the state sponsored forestry company.
