= Newtown (Hodgins) =

Townland in County Tipperary, Ireland

Newtown (Hodgins) (Irish: An Baile Nua (Hodgins)) is a townland in the historical Barony of Ormond Lower, County Tipperary, Ireland. It is located in the civil parish of Modreeny on the north-west side of the R491 road between Cloughjordan and Shinrone. The family name Hodgins is written in parentheses in both English and Irish.

In the 1901 census of Ireland there was still a Hodgins family living here.
