= Kylebeg =

Townland in County Tipperary, Ireland

Coordinates: 53°11′N 8°27′W

Kylebeg (An Choill Bheag in Irish) is a townland in the historical Barony of Ormond Upper, County Tipperary, Ireland.

== Location ==
The townland is located between Borrisokane and Cloughjordan along the R490 road, to the west of the townland of Modreeny.

== Modreeny ambush ==
Although known as the "Modreeny ambush" an event took place here at Kylebeg Cross on 3 June 1921, during the Irish War of Independence. The ambush was an attack on an RIC and Black and Tan patrol en route to the local Petty Sessions in Cloughjordan Courthouse. It was undertaken by a flying column led by Sean Gaynor and resulted in the deaths of four RIC/ Black and Tan members. RIC patrol of twelve men led by Sergeant Jones were cycling from RIC barracks in Borrisokane to Petty Sessions in Cloughjordan courthouse. The Borrisokane courthouse had been badly damaged by IRA attack and the court sitting was transferred to Cloughjordan. Just before the ambush the cycle patrol was overtaken by a motorised patrol of sixteen men in cars from Roscrea RIC barracks under the command of DI Edmund Fitzpatrick.

The RIC men who were killed were Con. James Briggs DCM MM (Borrisokane RIC from Garlieston, Scotland - a "Black & Tan"), Con. John Cantlon (Roscrea RIC from Ballyellin, Co Carlow), Con. Martin Feeney (Borrisokane RIC from Culleenanory, Co. Roscommon), and Con. William Walsh (Roscrea RIC from Co. Kilkenny).
