= Quakerstown =

Townland in County Tipperary, Ireland

Coordinates: 53.00579621104609°N 8.125340090706807°W

Quakerstown (Irish: Baile na gCaecar) is a townland in the Barony of Ormond Lower, County Tipperary, Ireland. It is located between Shinrone and Ballingarry in the civil parish of Ballingarry. Archives on the Placenames Database of Ireland indicate that a ruined Quaker meeting house stood here in 1840.
