= Islandwood =

Townland in County Tipperary, Ireland

Islandwood (Irish: Coill an Oileáin) is a townland in the Barony of Ormond Lower, County Tipperary, Ireland. It is located in the civil parish of Modreeny between Borrisokane and Cloughjordan.
