= Stoneyacre =

Townland in County Tipperary, Ireland

Stoneyacre (Irish: Na hAcraí Clochacha) is a townland in the Barony of Ormond Lower, County Tipperary, Ireland. The townland is located east of Cloughjordan in the civil parish of Modreeny.
