= Ollatrim =

Townland in County Tipperary, Ireland

Ollatrim (Calatroim in Irish) is a townland in the historical Barony of Ormond Upper, County Tipperary, Ireland. It is located in north Tipperary between the settlements of Toomevara and Moneygall. The Ollatrim River flows through Ollatrim and the R445 road passes over the river within the townland.

== Structures of note ==
Allatrim House (as spelled on National Inventory of Architectural Heritage) is a three bay private house built around 1820. The house is listed as being of architectural and artistic interest and is listed as a protected structure by Tipperary County Council (RPS Ref S307)

Victoria Mill, a three-storey rubble stone mill building, now in ruins, is also listed as a protected structure by Tipperary County Council (RPS Ref S308)
