= Killeen, County Tipperary =

Killeen An Cillín
- Town
- Location in Ireland
- Coordinates: 53°05′21″N 7°56′22″W
- Country: Ireland
- Province: Munster
- County: County Tipperary
- Elevation: 66 m (217 ft)
- Time zone: UTC+0 (WET)
  - Summer (DST): UTC-1 (IST (WEST))

Killeen (Irish: An Coillín) is a townland in the civil parish of Borrisokane, in the Barony of Ormond Lower, County Tipperary, Ireland.

It is one of eight townlands in County Tipperary sharing the name Killeen.
