= Eminiska =

Townland in County Tipperary, Ireland

Coordinates: 52.9555°N 8.0826°W

Eminiska (Irish: Ime an Uisce) is a small townland in the historical barony of Ormond Lower, County Tipperary, Ireland. Situated between Borrisokane and Cloughjordan, it has an area of approximately 1.15 square kilometres (0.44 sq mi). As of the 2011 census, Eminiska townland had a population of 17 people.

Buildings of note in the townland include Eminiska House – a two-storey Georgian house listed as a protected structure by Tipperary County Council (RPS Ref S159). Also nearby is Modreeny House, an Arts and Crafts style home built c. 1920.
