= Knockshigowna =

Townland in County Tipperary, Ireland

Coordinates: 53°00′47″N 8°00′07″W

Knockshigowna (Cnoc Sí Ghabhna in Irish) and often spelled "Knockshegowna" locally is a townland in the Barony of Ormond Lower, County Tipperary, Ireland. It is east of Ballingarry in the civil parish of Ballingarry.

== Sport ==
Knockshegowna GAA is a Gaelic Athletic Association club in Ballingarry, County Tipperary. The club are part of the North Tipperary GAA division. The club have been North Tipperary Junior Hurling Champions on nine occasions.

== In literature ==
Knockshegowna Hill and its supposed fairies is the subject of Richard D'Alton Williams' poem The Fairies of Knockshegowna and The Legend of Knockshegowna by Thomas Crofton Croker. The Faerie Queene by Edmund Spenser is said to have referred to the hill.
