= Knockanacree =

Townland in County Tipperary, Ireland

Knockanacree (Cnocán an Chraoi in Irish) is a townland in the historical Barony of Ormond Lower, County Tipperary, Ireland. The townland is located within the civil parish of Modreeny north of the town of Cloughjordan. Three areas within Knocknacree townland have been selected as the possible location for a Break Pressure Tank which is required for the proposed pipeline to supply drinking water from Lough Derg to Dublin.

== Knocknacree Woods ==
The townland includes a prominent wooded hill, originally the grounds of Knockanacree Wood House which was demolished during the Irish War of Independence. The woodland is now managed by Coillte as part of the Borrisokane Forest. There are walking trails leading through old beech wood to views of the surrounding area. Thomas MacDonagh wrote the poem Knocknacree about the wood visible from his family home. A weekly 5 km Parkrun takes place in the woods.
