= Ballysteena =

Small downland in the barony of Ormond Lower

Coordinates: 52.952°N 8.055°W

Ballysteena (Irish: Baile an Stiabhnaigh) is a small townland in the barony of Ormond Lower in County Tipperary, Ireland. It is 0.74 square kilometres (0.29 sq mi) in area and located in the civil parish of Modreeny, close to the town of Cloughjordan.
