= Ó Maoilriain =

Family name

Mulryan Ó Maoilriaghain
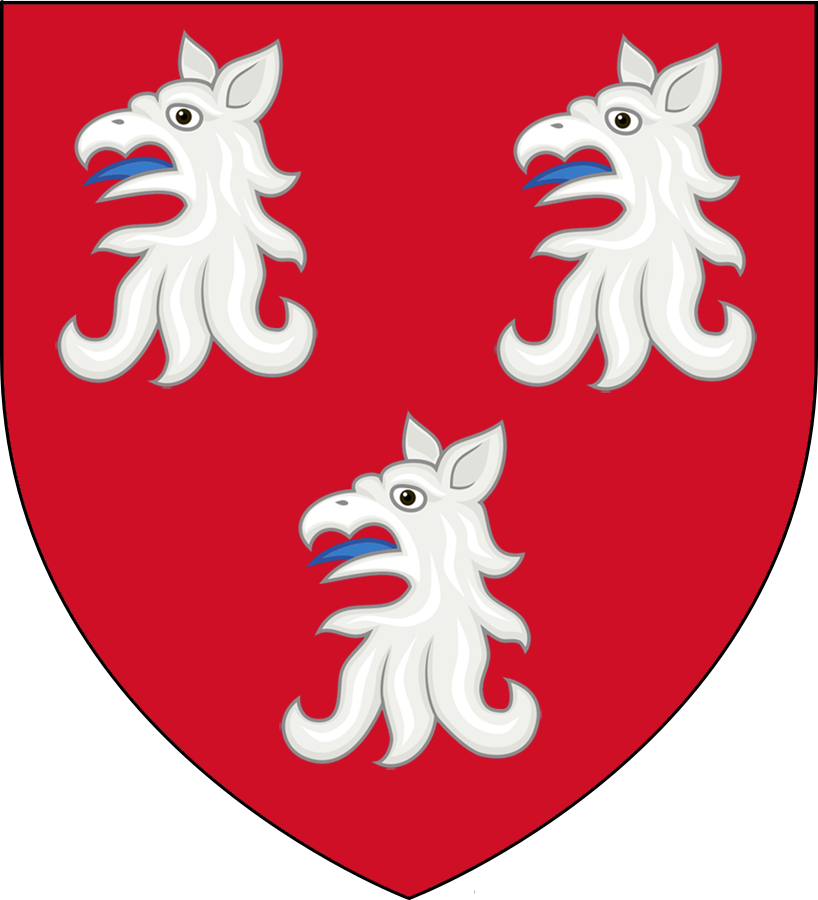
- Parent house: Laigin
- Country: Munster, Ormond & Leinster
- Founder: Righin mac Dubhghall
- Titles: Lord of Idrone; Lord of Owney
- Cadet branches: Ó Bruadair

Ó Maoilriain (anglicised as Ryan, Mulryan, or Mulrain) is an Irish Gaelic clan based in what is today County Tipperary and County Limerick. The clan claims descent from Cathair Mór of the Laighin, but they first appear in the historical record in the 15th century in the kingdom of Thomond. John O'Donovan claims they are distinct from the Ryan clan which ruled Uí Dróna in what is today County Carlow.

== Naming conventions ==
Male	Daughter	Wife (Long)	Wife (Short)
Ó Maoilriain	Ní Mhaoilriain	Bean Uí Mhaoilriain	Uí Mhaoilriain
Ó Maoilriaghain	Ní Mhaoilriaghain	Bean Uí Mhaoilriaghain	Uí Mhaoilriaghain

== Overview ==
This family claim descent from one Maoil Riagháin, who was named in honour of a Saint Riagháin.

It is first documented as a surname in the 15th century in east Thomond/north Ormond, where the Ó Maoilriains attacked and displaced the Ó hIfearnáin family. The territory they conquered became known as barony of Owney and Arra. Owney derived its name from one Uaithne Ó Maoilriain.

According to historian C. Thomas Cairney, the O'Mulryans were one of the chiefly families of the Feara Cualann who in turn were a tribe from the Dumnonii or Laigin who were the third wave of Celts to settle in Ireland during the first century BC.

== See also ==
- Éamonn an Chnoic
- MacGorman — another Laighin clan of Thomond
- Irish clans
