= Newtown, Ormond Upper =

Townland in County Tipperary, Ireland

Coordinates: 52.8675°N 8.1046°W

Newtown, (Irish: An Baile Nua) is a townland in the Barony of Ormond Upper in County Tipperary, Ireland. It is in the civil parish of Ballymackey and is one of nineteen townlands known as Newtown in County Tipperary.
