= Drumnamahane =

Townland in County Tipperary, Ireland

Coordinates: 52.9894°N 8.0848°W

Drumnamahane (Irish: Dromainn na Meatháin) is a townland in the historic Barony of Ormond Lower in County Tipperary, Ireland

It derives its name from the Irish 'Dromainn', meaning a 'ridge', and 'na Meatháin', the genitive case pertaining to the family name, Mahon, or O'Mahon. Therefore an English translation would be 'Mahon's/ O'Mahon's Ridge'.

The most striking architectural feature of the area is a large tower house, now totally derelict. It belonged to Stephen McEgan and was made over to Nicholas White during the Cromwellian conquest of Ireland when the latter was awarded lands in Ireland. It is a square castle 47 ft by 35 ft and the walls are 7 ft thick. It belongs to the 14th century. It was originally five storeys high, with the second floor resting on a stone arch. The walls were well grouted and the stone staircase passed through the thickness of the south and east walls. The windows were rectangular and constructed of chiselled limestone.

The separate townland of Drumnamahane Island is immediately to the east.
