= Richmond, County Tipperary =

Townland in County Tipperary, Ireland

Coordinates: 52.8764°N 8.2313°W

Richmond (Irish: Cill Ó Sealbhaigh) is a small townland in the historical barony of Ormond Lower, County Tipperary, Ireland. It is approximately 1.4 square kilometres (0.54 sq mi) in area and located in the civil parish of Monsea. The townland borders and overlaps with the town of Nenagh. As of the 2011 census, the townland had a population of 153.

The ruins of Richmond House and its entrance pillars and railings are listed on Tipperary County Council's Record of Protected Structures (ref S333).
