= Borrisokane Forest =

Borrisokane forest in County Tipperary extends from the R445 road northward to Portumna and from Lough Derg to the County Offaly border. The forest consists of several widely dispersed small areas of woodland centred on Borrisokane. Coillte, the state sponsored forestry company, manages the forest which includes plantations at Annagh (Birr), Annagh (Portumna), Ballyquirk, Clonfinane, Coolbaun, Cowbaun, Croghan, Crotta, Curraghglass, Derrybreen, Garraunorish, Kilcunnahin Beg, Kilcunnahin More, Killurane, Knockanacree near Cloghjordan, Kilbarron, Laghile, Minchins, Muckloon, Newlawn, Shanakill, Skehanagh (a farm partnership), Sopwell woods and Turravoghan. A weekly 5km Parkrun takes place in the Knockanacree section of the forest.
