= Alan Byrne (hurler) =

Irish hurler

Personal information
- Native name: Ailéin Ó Broin (Irish)
- Born: 21 December 1985 (age 40) Ballinderry, County Tipperary, Ireland
- Occupation: Quantity Surveyor

Sport
- Sport: Hurling
- Position: Right wing-back
Clubs
- Years: Club
- Shannon Rovers; Michael Cusack's
Club titles
- Tipperary titles: 0
Inter-county*
Years	County	Apps (scores)
2006-2008	Tipperary	3 (0-00)
Inter-county titles
- Munster titles: 0
- All-Irelands: 0
- NHL: 1
- All Stars: 0
- *Inter County team apps and scores correct as of 18:03, 4 April 2016.

Alan Byrne (born 21 December 1985) is an Irish hurler who played as a right wing-back for the Tipperary senior team.

Born in Ballinderry, County Tipperary, Byrne first played competitive hurling during his schooling at Flannans College Ennis winning Harty Cup Medals. He arrived on the inter-county scene at the age of twenty when he first linked up with the Tipperary under-21 team. He made his senior debut during the 2006 Waterford Crystal Cup. Byrne subsequently became a regular member of the team and won one National Hurling League medal.

At club level Byrne began his career with Shannon Rovers. He currently plays with Michael Cusack's in Sydney.

Throughout his career Byrne made 3 championship appearances for Tipperary. He left the senior panel after the conclusion of the 2008 championship, however, he returned to inter-county action as a member of the intermediate team over the following three years.

== Honours ==
Tipperary

- Munster Senior Hurling Championship (1): 2008
- National Hurling League (1): 2008
- Munster Under-21 Hurling Championship (1): 2006
- Fitzgibbon Cup All Ireland Colleges Winners: 2005, 2007
