= Edward Waller (zoologist) =

Irish zoologist

Edward Waller (1803–1873) was an Irish zoologist.

== Life ==
The son of Thomas Maunsell Waller and Margaret Vereker, Waller was born in Finnoe, County Tipperary. He was a landowner and barrister from County Tipperary. He owned Finnoe House, Borrisokane, a summer home in County Tyrone.

He had a keen interest in marine biology, and was a member of the Belfast Dredging Committee with George Crawford Hyndman, George Dickie and John Gwyn Jeffreys; in 1857 the committee received two years of funding from the British Association, and used Waller’s yacht to dredge Belfast Lough and Strangford Lough.

He had a large collection which he left to the National Museum of Ireland; this included the Circulus striatus, a new specimen which he found in Donegal.

He was interested in Mollusca and Foraminifera 1867-68 and is honoured in the name Aclis walleri so named by Jeffreys in 1867.

His younger brother was John Francis Waller (1809-1894)

== Family ==
Waller married Mary Crossle on 3 August 1829 at Aughnacloy, County Tyrone. Mary was the only daughter of Henry Crossle of Avaline House in County Tyrone.

== Works ==
- Waller, Edward 1867 Report on the Foraminifera obtained in the Shetland Seas. Report Brit. Assoc. (Dundee, 1867), 1867, pp. 441-446. London.
- Waller, Edward 1868 Report on the Shetland Foraminifera for 1868. Report Brit. Assoc. (Norwich, 1868), 1868, pp. 340, 341. London.
