= Crotta =

Townland in Ormond Lower, County Tipperary, Ireland

Crotta, (Irish: An Chrotach) is a townland in the Barony of Ormond Lower in County Tipperary, Ireland. It is located between the towns of Borrisokane and Cloughjordan.

The woods at Crotta form a part of Borrisokane Forest which consists of several widely dispersed small areas of woodland managed by Coillte, the state sponsored forestry company.
