= Press Council of Ireland =

Irish regulatory body

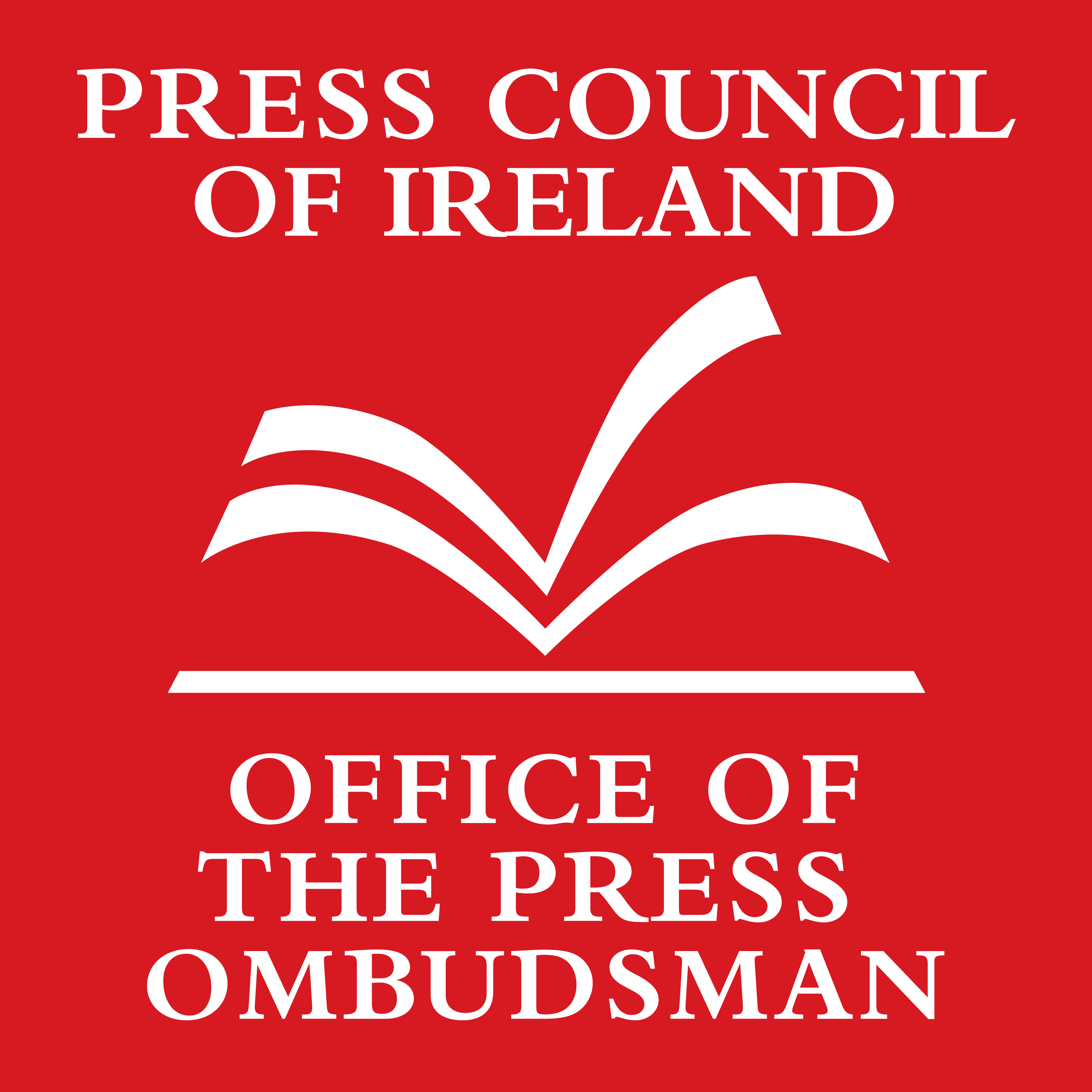
- Formation: 11 January 2008; 18 years ago
- Type: Non-governmental organisation
- Legal status: Independent self-regulatory body
- Purpose: Upholding a Code of Practice for newspapers, magazines and online news; handling complaints against the press
- Headquarters: 32 Westland Square, Pearse Street, Dublin 2, D02 R9T2
- Region served: Ireland
- Services: Monitoring compliance with press standards; appeals body for complaints
- Members: Over 100 publications (2024)
- Chair: Rory Montgomery
- Deputy Chair: James Doorley
- Website: presscouncil.ie

The Press Council of Ireland is a self-regulatory body that is tasked with maintaining ethical standards and accountability in Irish journalism. Established in 2008, it is intended to provide the public with an independent forum for resolving complaints against the press while aiming to ensure the freedom of the press.

== Overview ==
The Press Council of Ireland is an independent body established in 2008 to maintain the professional standards of journalism in Ireland and provide the public with a system of redress for complaints against newspapers, magazines, and online news outlets. Its creation followed recommendations by an independent committee in 2007, which advocated for a self-regulatory system to balance media freedom with accountability. The body was launched alongside the Office of the Press Ombudsman, and both institutions were later underpinned by the Defamation Act 2009, which formally recognised the Press Council's role in resolving complaints as an alternative to legal action.

The council operates as a self-regulatory body funded entirely by its members, which include all major national newspapers, many local and regional titles, several magazines, and a number of digital-only publishers. It is made up of thirteen members drawn from the public and the media sector, with appointments made by an independent appointments committee. This structure is intended to ensure a balance between media expertise and public interest, while maintaining independence from government or corporate control.

Central to the organisation's work is a code of practice, which sets out principles that member publications are expected to uphold. These include commitments to truth and accuracy, respect for privacy, protection of sources, and the right of reply. When individuals believe a publication has breached these standards, they can lodge a complaint with the Press Ombudsman. The ombudsman first attempts to resolve issues through mediation, and where this fails, makes a formal decision. In complex or disputed cases, appeals can be made to the Press Council itself.

The Press Council does not impose fines or legal sanctions, but it does require publications to publish its decisions in full when complaints are upheld. This form of reputational accountability is seen as the primary form of redress, particularly given the speed and accessibility of the complaints process compared to litigation. The council's annual reports often note that only a small number of complaints are ultimately upheld, which is sometimes interpreted as a sign of responsible journalism among member outlets.

In the 2020s, the Press Council has sought to adapt to changing media habits, particularly the rise of online platforms and independent digital journalism. In 2025, it launched a review of its membership criteria to consider the inclusion of online writers and new media platforms such as Substack, reflecting growing public reliance on non-traditional sources of news.

== Background to creation ==
The Press Council of Ireland was established in response to long-standing concerns about the accountability and standards of the Irish press. For decades, Ireland had no formal mechanism to handle complaints about newspapers, and previous proposals for regulation were either ignored or resisted, particularly by media organisations wary of state interference. In the 1980s, trade unions pushed for a press council to improve media coverage of labour issues, but the idea was not pursued. Throughout the 1990s, while there were growing calls for defamation law reform, little progress was made in establishing a regulatory structure.

By the early 2000s, the need for change became more urgent. Irish newspapers, frustrated by what they felt were outdated defamation laws, began advocating for a system of self-regulation as a strategic move to gain government support for legal reform. These discussions, facilitated by a Newspaper Steering Committee and supported by then-Minister for Justice Michael McDowell, led to the creation of the Press Council of Ireland and the Office of the Press Ombudsman on 11 January 2008. This voluntary model was recognised in the Defamation Act 2009 and was influenced by regulatory systems in countries like the UK and Sweden, though it was tailored for the Irish context.

The formation of the Press Council was also shaped by broader cultural and economic pressures. Public trust in the media had been declining, and the press faced growing criticism for poor standards and ethical breaches. The post-2008 Irish economic downturn further intensified the need for the industry to show that it could be accountable and responsive to public concerns. The resulting model aimed to balance press freedom with public interest, using a self-regulatory approach that obliged newspapers to publish decisions against them prominently and unedited, marking a shift in Irish media governance.

== Code of practice ==
The code of practice of the Press Council of Ireland sets out the ethical and professional standards that press members must uphold, balancing freedom of the press with responsibility. It demands truth and accuracy in reporting, clear distinction between fact and comment, and fairness in gathering news without misrepresentation or harassment unless justified by public interest. It aims to protect individuals' rights to privacy and reputation while allowing for public interest considerations, and requires respect and sensitivity, especially concerning children and those in vulnerable situations. The code also insists on protecting journalistic sources, fair court reporting, avoiding prejudice or hate speech, and exercising caution in suicide reporting. It also requires member publications to publish decisions by the Press Ombudsman or Press Council when necessary, ensuring accountability and transparency.

== Council members ==
As of 2025, the body's members included:

Name	Category
Noeline Blackwell	Independent member
James Doorley	Independent member (Deputy Chair)
Alan Dukes	Independent member
Edith Geraghty	Independent member
Tim Hinchey	Independent member
Siobhán Holliman	Industry member
Bob Hughes	Industry member
Samantha McCaughren	Industry member
Sunniva McDonagh	Independent member
Rory Montgomery	Independent member (Chair)
Conor O’Donnell	Industry member
Roddy O’Sullivan	Industry member
Duan Stokes	Industry member

=== Chairs of the council ===
The chair of the Press Council of Ireland leads the independent body. Appointed through an open process, the chair is responsible for guiding the council's deliberations, aiming to ensure impartiality in its decision-making, and representing the Press Council in public affairs. The role is designed to be non-political and independent of the press industry, and is intended to maintain public trust in the regulation of print and online journalism. The chair serves a fixed term, which may be renewed, but cannot exceed six years in total.

Chairs of the Press Council of Ireland
Chair	Background	Term	Sources
Thomas Noel Mitchell	Former Provost of Trinity College Dublin and noted classicist	11 January 2008 – 6 May 2010	
Dáithí Ó Ceallaigh	Retired diplomat; former Ambassador to the United States and Permanent Representative to the European Union	1 August 2010 – 31 August 2016	
Seán Donlon	Retired diplomat; former Ambassador to the United States and Secretary General of the Department of Foreign Affairs	1 September 2016 – 31 March 2022	
Rory Montgomery	Retired diplomat; former Permanent Representative of Ireland to the European Union and Second Secretary General in the Departments of the Taoiseach and Foreign Affairs	1 April 2022 – present	

== Member publications ==
The Press Council of Ireland counts all of Ireland’s major national newspapers among its members, including The Irish Times, The Irish Independent, The Irish Examiner and Sunday Business Post, as well as tabloids such as The Irish Sun and Irish Mirror. In the 2010s and 2020s, digital publications such as The Ditch and The Journal joined, reflecting its inclusion of online media. The council also encompasses numerous regional titles as well as magazines such as Village and GCN.
