= Sopwell =

Sopwell may refer to:

- Sopwell, County Tipperary, a townland in Ireland
- Sopwell, Hertfordshire, England
- Sopwell House, a large house, now a hotel in Hertfordshire, England
- Sopwell Priory, a ruined priory in Hertfordshire, England
