= Ballymackey =

Townland in County Tipperary, Ireland

Coordinates: 52°53′N 8°05′W

Ballymackey (Irish: Bhaile Uí Mhacaí) is a townland and a civil parish in County Tipperary, Ireland. It is located between Toomevara and Cloughjordan. It is in the Dáil constituency of Offaly which incorporates 24 electoral divisions that were previously in the constituency of North Tipperary.

== Facilities ==
Ballymackey Football Club plays on an AstroTurf pitch in Ballinree.

The recycling centre located at Ballaghveny in Ballymackey was closed in 2011 pending a new arrangement being set up to run the facility.

== Notable people ==
William Chester, the fifth Bishop of Killaloe, Kilfenora, Clonfert and Kilmacduagh and author. Educated at Trinity College, Dublin, held the incumbency at Ballymackey before his appointment to the episcopate in 1884.

The Ó Tighearnaigh of Ormond family held land in Ormond Upper including Ballymackey.

== Buildings of interest ==
The ruined St Michael's church at Cloonmore was commissioned by the Board of First Fruits. The building is listed as being of special Architectural, Archaeological and Social interest.

Castle Willington is an 18th-century Georgian style private residence with a 19th-century towerhouse style extension. Located beside the Ollatrim River in the townland of Killowney Big. The building is listed as being of architectural and archaeological interest.

== Townlands in the civil parish ==
- Ballaghveny
- Ballinahemery
- Ballinree
- Ballyknockane
- Ballymackey
- Bessborough
- Clashnevin
- Clonalea
- Cloonmore
- Coolderry
- Derrybane
- Derrycarney
- Donnybrook
- Elmhill
- Falleen
- Garravally
- Gortnadrumman
- Grenanstown
- Kilgorteen
- Killeisk
- Killowney Big
- Killowney Little
- Knockahunna
- Knockanglass
- Lismore
- Lisnamoe
- Lissanisky
- Newtown
- Park
- Riverlawn
- Shanbally
- Tooreigh
- Wilton
- Woodville

== See also ==
- List of civil parishes of Tipperary
