= O'Meara's Acres =

Townland in County Tipperary, Ireland

Coordinates: 52°59′29″N 8°15′59″W

O'Meara's Acres (Irish: Acraí Uí Mheára) is a townland in the Barony of Ormond Lower, County Tipperary, Ireland. It is located in the Civil parish of Kilbarron.

Lesseragh House, a four bay, two storey residence with three chimneys, parapet eaves and a porch to the front is listed as a protected structure by Tipperary County Council (RPS Ref S309)
