= Firgrove =

Firgrove may refer to:

- Firgrove, Western Cape
- Firgrove, County Tipperary
