= Ballinderry, County Tipperary =

Ballinderry Baile an Doire
- Village
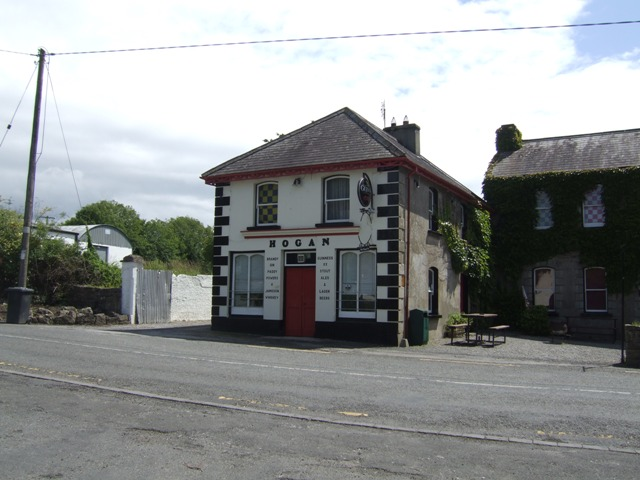
- Hogan's pub, Ballinderry

- Location in Ireland
- Coordinates: 53°01′25″N 8°13′23″W
- Country: Ireland
- Province: Munster
- County: County Tipperary
- Time zone: UTC+0 (WET)
  - Summer (DST): UTC-1 (IST (WEST))

Ballinderry (Irish: Baile an Doire) is a village and a townland in the historical Barony of Ormond Lower, County Tipperary, Ireland. It is located between Terryglass and Nenagh where the R493 road crosses the Ballyfinboy River.

== Buildings of note ==
Several local structures are listed as being of architectural interest.

- A four arch bridge with low arches carries the R493 road over the Ballyfinboy River.
- Ballinderry Mill, a rubble stone mill building in ruins with mill wheel in location is listed as a protected structure (RPS Ref S296) by Tipperary County Council. The Mill Lodge, a three bay, single storey over basement lodge is also listed (RPS Ref S301).
- On the roadside just south of the bridge stands an early 20th-century house which has rusticated stucco work, a strip of ceramic tiles and decorative eaves (RPS Ref S298).
- Ballinderry House, a three bay, two storey residence (RPS Ref S299).
- Elsie Hogan's, a two-storey roadside public house (RPS Ref S300) . Now home to Dé Róiste's Award winning smokehouse and restaurant.

== Sport ==
The Shannon Rovers are the local Gaelic Athletic club. Ballinderry is on one of the North Tipperary Cycle Routes which starts at Banba Square, Nenagh.
