= Dublin University Magazine =

Monthly literary and cultural publication, 1833–82

- Former editors: Charles Stanford; Isaac Butt; James Wills; Charles Lever; John Francis Waller; Cheyne Brady; Sheridan Le Fanu; John Francis Waller; Durham Dunlop
- Categories: Literature, social issues, popular culture
- Frequency: Monthly
- First issue: 1833
- Final issue: 1882
- Country: Ireland
- Based in: Dublin
- Language: English

The Dublin University Magazine was an independent literary cultural and political magazine published in Dublin from 1833 to 1882. It started out as a magazine of political commentary but increasingly became devoted to literature. The magazine was published under the title The Dublin University Magazine: A Literary and Political Journal from January 1833 to December 1877 (volumes 1 to 90), then under the title The University Magazine: A Literary and Philosophic Review with a new series from 1878 to 1880 (volumes 1 to 5), and then under the title The University Magazine with a quarterly series from 1880 to 1882.

== Early days ==
The year 1832 had been one of political and ecumenical upheaval: disturbances in Britain led to the Reform Act of that year, the Tithe War was raging in Ireland and the new Whig government was gaining influential supporters in Trinity College Dublin. A number of young men associated with the college, including Isaac Butt, John Anster (translator of Goethe's Faust) and John Francis Waller decided to found a magazine with the objective of discussing the new developments and defending the Tories. Although all the founders were Trinity educated, there was no official connection with the college. The first issue appeared in January 1833.

The magazine was modelled on British magazines such as Blackwood's Edinburgh Magazine and Fraser's Magazine of London, and was Protestant and Unionist in outlook. However, this did not preclude a keen interest in Irish life and letters. The publishers were William Curry Jun. and Company. Their agent for the magazine was a Scotsman, James McGlashan, who became the publisher himself in 1846. Its first editor was Charles Stanford.

Part of the cultural programme of the magazine was to counter the Catholic claim to possession of a Gaelic past by showing how Protestant minds and hearts could respond to Irish literature and history.

Through the 1830s and 1840s the chief ideologist of the magazine was Mortimer O'Sullivan, a Grand Chaplain of the Orange Order in Ireland, a role he shared with his brother Samuel. Editors during the 1840s and 1850s were James Wills, Charles Lever and John Francis Waller, all of whom also contributed articles.

At its best the magazine gave encouragement, relatively generous payment and an audience ranging beyond Ireland itself to emerging writers. It shared readers and sometimes writers with British magazines and even with the Nationalist The Nation (for example, the Young Irelander Michael Joseph Barry, a friend of Sheridan Le Fanu's brother William, who was arrested in 1848 on a charge of treason).

== Sheridan Le Fanu ==
Sheridan Le Fanu's first story appeared in the magazine in January 1838, the first of twelve instalments of the Purcell Papers, called The Ghost and the Bone-Setter. His sister Catherine, who was sickly, also had articles published in the magazine a few years later (she died in 1841). In March and April 1843 he contributed Spalatro, the tale of an Italian bandit, probably influenced by the death of his sister. Next to appear in the magazine were The Mysterious Lodger, anonymously, in 1850 and Ghost Stories of Chapelizod the following year.

In 1861 Le Fanu purchased the magazine from Cheyne Brady and assumed the editorship. From then until the end of the decade he wrote a number of stories, usually under his own name, serialised in the magazine and then appearing in book form.

When Le Fanu bought the magazine the main contributors were Percy Fitzgerald and L. J. Trotter, both of whom were versatile writers. The content was fiction, verse, geographical articles, folklore, literature – very little attention to politics, if any at all. Seven years later there are some new contributors: Patrick Kennedy, a Catholic bookseller who became a good friend of Fanu's, Fanu's daughter, Eleanor Frances, and Nina Cole, but the content remained much the same. His daughter joined Nina Cole, Annie Robertson and Rhoda Broughton (a niece) in having articles and then books published with his help.

Other authors whose works were published in the magazine included William Carleton, Mortimer Collins, Elliot Warburton, Thomas Meredith, David Masson, William Archer Butler, James Clarence Mangan and Samuel Ferguson.

== See also ==
- Sheridan Le Fanu
- Isaac Butt
- Uncle Silas
