= R493 road (Ireland) =

Road in County Tipperary, Ireland

R493 road
- Bóthar R493
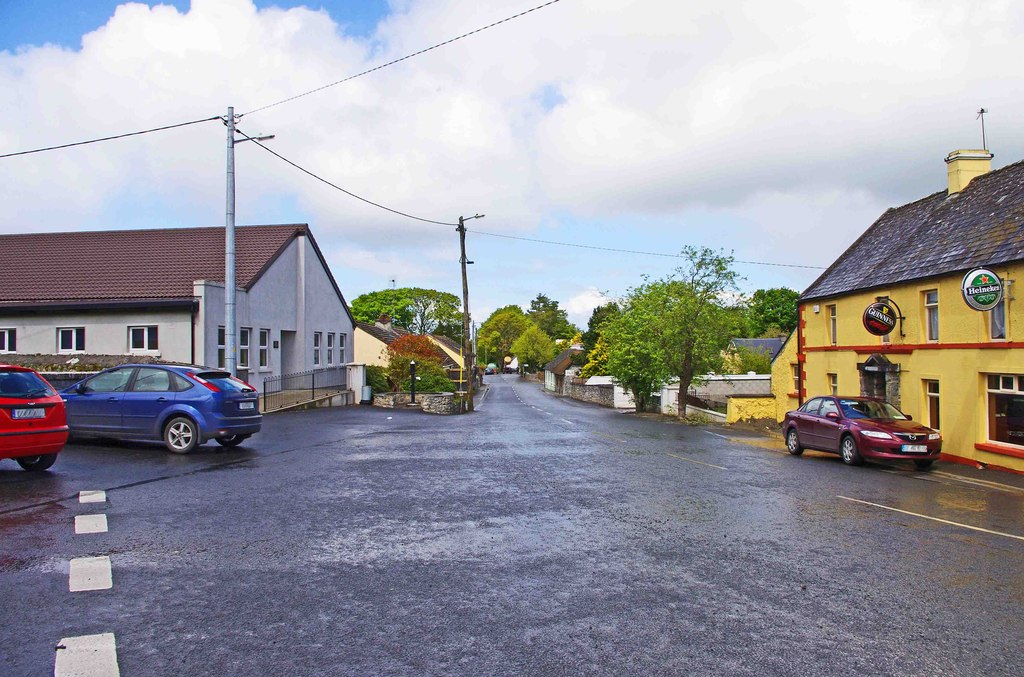
- Puckane on the R493

Route information
- Length: 29 km (18 mi)

Location
- Country: Ireland
- Primary destinations: County Tipperary; Nenagh - Starts at Scott's Bridge on N52; Puckane; Knigh; Coolbawn; Crosses the Ballyfinboy River; Ballinderry; Terryglass; Carrigahorig Terminates at the junction with N65

Highway system
- Roads in Ireland; Motorways; Primary; Secondary; Regional

The R493 is a regional road in County Tipperary, Ireland linking Nenagh, via Puckane, Coolbawn, Ballinderry where it crosses the Ballyfinboy River and Terryglass to Carrigahorig. The road is approximately 29 km (18 mi) long. The road arcs to the west of the N52 and N65 roads which cover the distance in 21 km (13 mi).

== See also ==
- Roads in Ireland - (Primary National Roads)
- Secondary Roads
- Regional Roads
