= Carrigahorig =

Hamlet in County Tipperary, Ireland

Coordinates: 53.0644°N 8.1437°W

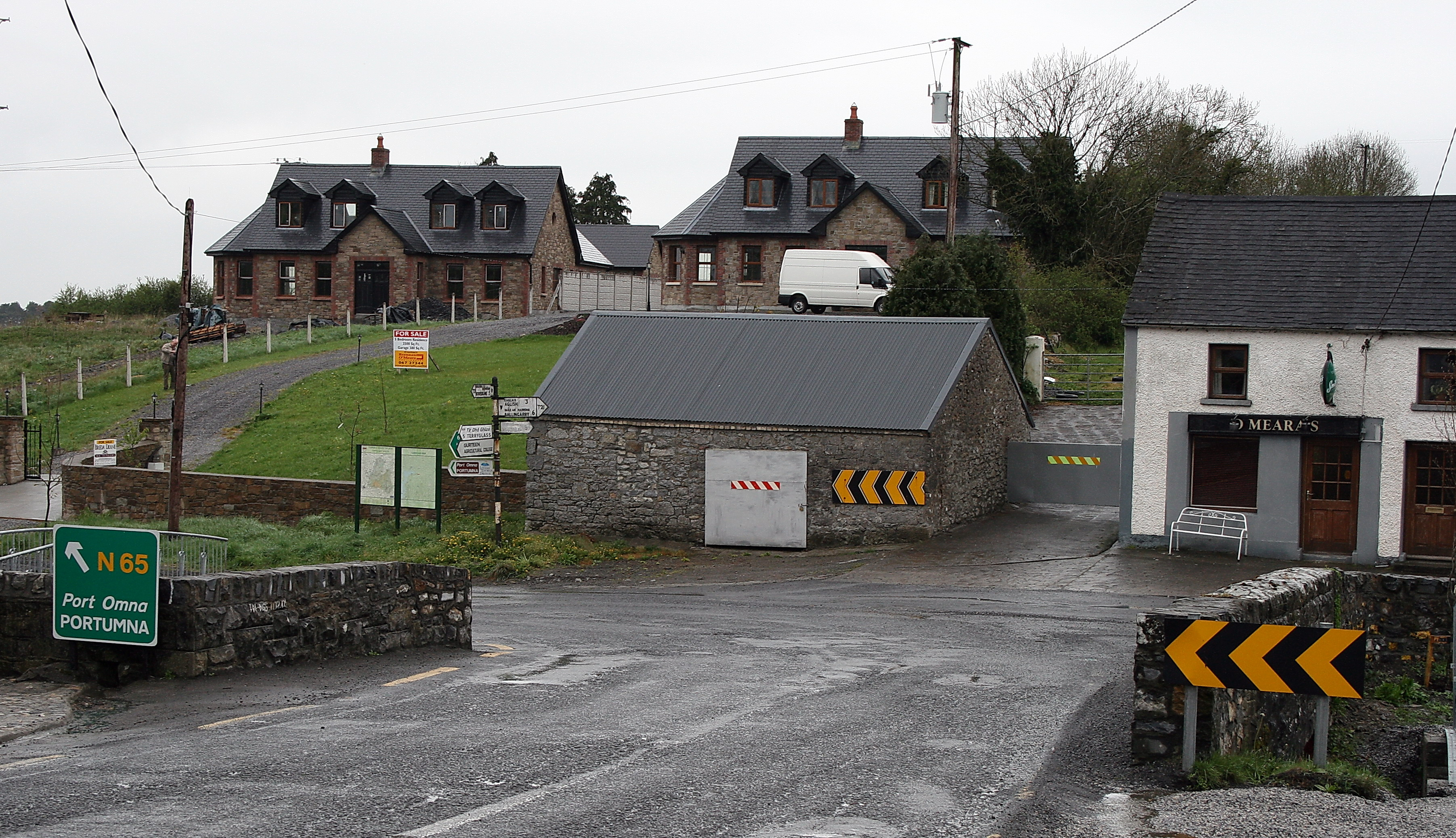
Carrigahorig on the N65

Carrigahorig (Irish: Carraig an Chomhraic) is a hamlet in County Tipperary, Ireland, located 7 km (4.3 mi) east of Portumna on the N65 national secondary road. The northern end of the R493 terminates here.

The village is centred on a bridge over a stream feeding Lough Derg, the northeastern tip of which is less than 2 km (1.2 mi) west of Carrigahorig.

The ruins of Ballyquirk Castle lie approximately 1 kilometre (0.62 mi) northeast of the village.

== See also ==
- List of towns in the Republic of Ireland
