= Ballyfinboy River =

River in Ireland

Coordinates: 53°02′N 8°15′W

The Ballyfinboy River rises close to Moneygall in County Offaly, Ireland and flows in a generally northwesterly direction into Lough Derg at Drominagh. It forms part of the boundary between County Tipperary and County Offaly. The river flows through the towns of Cloughjordan and Borrisokane west of which it flows past Ballyfinboy Castle, a ruined tower house with a Sheela na gig in the townland of Ballyfinboy.

== Bridges ==
Knockearl Bridge carries the R491 road from County Offaly on the south bank across the river to Cloughjordan on the north bank in County Tipperary

An ornate stone bridge with cast iron railings carries the avenue leading to Modreeny across the Ballyfinboy.

Modern pedestrian bridges in Borrisokane town park link the two sections of the park, north and south of the river.

Ballinderry Bridge carries the R493 road across the river. It is an elegant five arch bridge with low arches.

The three arched Drominagh Demesne Toll Bridge was built by the land owner in 1776 the now disused shelter for the toll collector is still visible.

== Angling ==
An electric fishing survey of the river at Ballinderry was conducted in September 2012 by Inland Fisheries Ireland. Species noted here were Brown trout (26) and Salmon (15).
