= Tom Duffy (hurler) =

Irish hurler (1894–1989)

Personal information
- Native name: Tomás Ó Dufaigh (Irish)
- Born: 4 May 1894 Rathcabbin, County Tipperary, Ireland
- Died: 24 February 1989 (aged 94) Rathcabbin, County Tipperary, Ireland
- Occupation: Farmer

Sport
- Sport: Hurling
- Position: Right wing-forward
Club
- Years: Club
- 1911-1934: Lorrha
Club titles
- Tipperary titles: 0
Inter-county
- Years: County
- 1923-1927: Tipperary
Inter-county titles
- Munster titles: 2
- All-Irelands: 1

Thomas Duffy (4 May 1894 – 24 February 1989) was an Irish hurler. His career included All-Ireland Championship success with the Tipperary senior hurling team.

== Playing career ==
After playing hurling and Gaelic football during his schooldays, Duffy played his first senior hurling match for Lorrha against Toomevara. It was the beginning of a near 25-year club career which yielded two North Tipperary Championship in 1914 and 1924. Duffy was added to the Tipperary senior hurling team in advance of the 1923 Munster Championship. He won his first Munster Championship medal in 1924 before claiming a second successive title in 1925. Although known as a right wing-back at club level, Duffy was selected at right wing-forward for the 1925 All-Ireland final against Galway. He ended the game with a winners' medal after the 5–03 to 1–05 victory. Duffy continued to line out with Tipperary for a further two years.

== Personal life and death ==
Duffy was born in Rathcabbin, County Tipperary, the youngest of three children of John and Jane (née Nolan). His father died when he was seven year old and, after completing his education at Rathcabbin N.S., he took over the running of the family farm from his uncle. Duffy joined the Irish Volunteers at a young age and as a member of the 4th Battalion of the Offaly Brigade of the Irish Republican Army he played an active role during the War of Independence. An opponent of the Anglo-Irish Treaty, he took the Republican side during the Civil War and was imprisoned at various times in Birr Castle, Templemore, Portlaoise and the Curragh. Duffy married Emily Harding (1897–1986) in June 1924 and had eight children.

Duffy, aged 94, died on 24 February 1989 at the family home in Rathcabbin. At the time of his death he was the oldest-living All-Ireland medallist and the last surviving member of Tipperary's 1925 All-Ireland Championship-winning team.

== Honours ==
=== Player ===
Lorrha

- North Tipperary Senior Hurling Championship (2): 1914, 1924

Tipperary

- All-Ireland Senior Hurling Championship (1): 1925
- Munster Senior Hurling Championship (2): 1924, 1925

=== Selector ===
Lorrha

- North Tipperary Senior Hurling Championship (1): 1948
