= Anne Young (nurse) =

Irish nurse

- Born: 5 August 1907; Rathcabbin, County Tipperary, Ireland
- Died: June 1976 (aged 68)
- Occupation: Nursing
- Employer: St. James's Hospital
- Known for: Nursing education

Anne Young (5 August 1907 – June 1976) was an Irish nurse and founder of the nursing school at St James's Hospital, Dublin.

== Background and education ==
Young was born in Rathcabbin, County Tipperary, where her parents were farmers. Young had two sisters and two brothers. She attended Rathcabbin National School in Rathcabbin and St John's Convent School in Birr, County Offaly. Young then moved to England, where she completed her general nursing training at Great Yarmouth General Hospital in 1930, qualifying in midwifery in 1932. In 1935, she graduated from the University of Leeds with a diploma in nursing, following by a certificate in housekeeping from University College Hospital in London.

== Career ==
Young worked as a nurse manager in Great Yarmouth and London from 1933 to 1935. From 1936 to 1937, she was a nursing tutor in Maidstone. Returning to Ireland in 1937, she became a nursing tutor at Sir Patrick Dun's Hospital. In 1939, she became assistant matron at the same hospital, a post she held until 1945. From 1945 to 1950, Young was matron of the Jervis Street Hospital where she was heavily involved in education, setting up a "preliminary training school". In 1950, she took up a post as matron of St Kevin's Hospital, now known as St. James's Hospital. During her long career at St. James's Hospital, Young established Ireland's first general nursing school in 1967. She was appointed Director of Nurse Education for the Dublin Health Authority and began a school of midwifery in 1970. Young developed refresher courses for married nurses returning to work, for which she was commended by the Minister for Health Erskine Hamilton Childers. Young was a member of and examiner for An Bord Altranais. She served as president of the Catholic Nurses Guild of Ireland and was selected as president of the Irish Matron's Association.

== Death and legacy ==
Young retired in July 1972. She died in June 1976. St. James's Hospital named a ward in her honour.
