= Scohaboy Bog =

Coordinates: 52.979°N 8.058°W

Scohaboy Bog (Móin na Scotha Buí in Irish) is a raised bog in County Tipperary in Ireland. It lies approximately 6 km northwest of Cloughjordan, County Tipperary, between the N52 and R490 roads.

A Natural Heritage Area has been designated to protect the bog. The site has mixed ownership with approx a third each owned by the state forestry company Coillte, the National Parks and Wildlife Service and private landowners. The adjacent Sopwell woods is owned by Coillte. Coillte refer to its section of the bog as being approximately 70 ha: the bog is described as "large" in the site synopsis for the Natural Heritage Area, but no area is given.

The raised bog restoration programme at Scohaboy is one of Ireland`s most successful community supported conservation and climate action projects. The bog has seen three major restoration interventions, beginning with Coillte`s EU/LIFE project, launched in May 2015, a second project by NPWS funded under the National Raised Bog Restoration Plan was launched in November 2022 and a third project by NPWS and involving mostly private landowners took place in winter 2023 to bring close to 90% of the site under conservation management.

== Ecology ==
As well as typical high bog plants, Scohaboy provides habitat for the rare Sphagnum imbricatum, and Prunus padus has been recorded. Scohaboy Bog supports a diversity of raised bog microhabitats, including extensive hummock/hollow complexes. Being one of the more southerly raised bogs in the country adds significantly to its ecological value.

== Restoration ==
Scohaboy Bog is one of two demonstration sites for the European Union LIFE project, "Demonstrating Best Practice in Raised Bog Restoration in Ireland" (LIFE09 NAT/IE/000222). The project is being managed by Coillte and focuses on the restoration of 636 ha of raised bog habitat on 17 Coillte owned sites within the Natura 2000 Network and in Natural Heritage Areas. The project was jointly funded by EU Directorate-General for the Environment, the National Parks and Wildlife Service (at that time in the remit of the Department of Arts, Heritage and the Gaeltacht) and Coillte. The Cloughjordan Community Development Association is involved in the management of the project at Scohaboy, where 71.80 ha of bog are being restored.

Coillte are aiming to improve the condition of the bog by implementing ecological restoration techniques developed in Restoring Raised Bog in Ireland, an earlier LIFE project in which Coillte was involved. This involves removing non-native tree species and blocking drains. They are noting changes in vegetation and water levels.

== Access ==
The demonstration site was officially opened in 2015 by Tom Hayes, TD. A 400m wooden bog bridge leads to a raised platform where visitors can see views across the bog. The Cloughjordan Community Development Association extended the boardwalk in order to connect with existing bog roads to create the 5.75 kms Loop of Laghile and Loughaun National Trail, launched in May 2019 by Author and Guide, John G. Ó Dwyer. The trailhead is in Sopwell Woodlands.

== Protection ==
The bog was declared a Natural Heritage Area (ref. NHA 393) in 2005 under the Irish Wildlife Act. In 2015 it was reported that it was expected to be upgraded to Special Area of Conservation (SAC) status.

== Threats ==
For centuries peat bogs have been harvested for turf (peat) for use as fuel for domestic fires. The tradition continues at Scohaboy. There is evidence of drainage activity and fire damage.
