= George Hannigan =

Irish Gaelic footballer

Personal information
- Born: 16 September 1987 (age 39)

Sport
- Sport: Gaelic Football
- Position: Midfield
Club
- Years: Club
- 2004–: Shannon Rovers
Inter-county
Years	County	Apps (scores)
2006–2018	Tipperary	36 (0-13)

George Hannigan (born 16 September 1987) is an Irish Gaelic football player who plays at inter-county level for Tipperary, and plays his club football for Shannon Rovers.

== Career ==
Hannigan made his championship debut for Tipperary in 2006 against Kerry On 31 July 2016, he started in midfield as Tipperary defeated Galway in the 2016 All-Ireland Quarter-finals at Croke Park to reach their first All-Ireland semi-final since 1935. On 21 August 2016, Tipperary were beaten in the semi-final by Mayo on a 2-13 to 0-14 scoreline.

On 24 October 2018, Hannigan announced his retirement from inter-county football.

== Honours ==
Tipperary

- National Football League Division 3 (2): 2009, 2017
- National Football League Division 4 (1): 2014
