= River Shannon to Dublin pipeline =

The River Shannon to Dublin pipeline, officially the Water Supply Project, Eastern and Midlands Region, is a planned project to bring water from the Parteen Basin on the River Shannon to Peamount to supply the Dublin region and areas along the route in counties Tipperary, Offaly and Westmeath.

== History ==
Dublin City Council published a plan in 2011 to supply up to 350 million litres of water a day from Lough Derg to Dublin city and region. In January 2014, Irish Water took over management of the project which is currently in the Planning Stage. In 2016 it was indicated that over two million people would benefit from the water supply, which would service a large portion of Leinster including Dublin, Arklow, Athlone, Athy, Carlow, Drogheda, Mullingar, Navan, Portlaoise and Tullamore. In 2018 Irish Water announced plans to seek planning permission for the project.

The proposed pipeline was sent for review to the Commission for Regulation of Utilities amid questions about Irish Water’s leakage targets, whether groundwater was appropriately considered as an alternative to the pipeline, and the cost of the proposal. The CRU completed its final report on the project in June 2024 and gave its approval to the project advancing to the next stage of planning.

In 2024, the project was permitted to seek planning permission by the Irish Government.

In January 2025, the Department of Housing, Local Government and Heritage estimated that water sources in the Greater Dublin region would reach capacity in the late 2020s and that water restrictions would be necessary unless the Shannon pipeline is built.

== Preferred route ==
In November 2016, the Parteen Basin, which is to the south of Lough Derg, was chosen as the proposed site of extraction. Water would be pumped via Birdhill to a break pressure tank at Knockanacree near Cloughjordan, all in County Tipperary and would be gravity-fed from there to Peamount in Dublin.

== Concerns ==
A number of groups oppose the pipeline on economic, environmental and other grounds. The River Shannon Protection Alliance, Fight the Pipe and Kennedy Analysis have been among the most vocal opponents.

A primary objection to the pipeline is the contention that if leakage reduction targets were achieved in Dublin, the pipeline would be unnecessary. In 2015, national network leakage (i.e. leakage on the distribution side of the network, not including any household leakage) was 49%.

As the proposed extraction of water upstream of the ESB's hydroelectric station at Ardnacrusha may reduce the flow available for the generation of electricity, Irish Water will compensate ESB for any loss.
