= Shannon Rovers GAA =

Gaelic games club in County Tipperary, Ireland

- Fánaithe na Sionainne
- County: Tipperary
- Colours: Red & White & Black
- Grounds: Ballinderry
- Coordinates: 53.013647°N 8.216915°W

Playing kits
Standard colours

Shannon Rovers GAA is a Tipperary GAA club which is located in the north of County Tipperary, Ireland. Both hurling and Gaelic football are played in the North Tipperary divisional competitions. The club is centered on the villages of Ballinderry, Terryglass and Kilbarron.

One of the founders of the club, John Lynch, was the great grandfather of singer, Shane MacGowan. In 2024, following MacGowan's death, the club produced a commemorative jersey featuring both Lynch and MacGowan.

== Achievements ==
- Munster Junior B Football Championship: (1) 2024
- Tipperary Intermediate Hurling Championship 1986
- North Tipperary Intermediate Football Championship (2) 1990, 2011
- North Tipperary Intermediate Hurling Championship (9) 1939, 1954, 1967, 1968, 1974, 1975, 1985, 1986, 2010
- Tipperary Junior B Football Championship (1) 2023
- Tipperary Junior A Hurling Championship (2) 1939, 1968
- North Tipperary Junior A Hurling Championship (2) 1940, 1952
- North Tipperary Junior A Football Championship (6) 1988, 1989, 2005, 2012, 2013, 2026
- North Tipperary Junior B Football Championship (2) 2004, 2023
- North Tipperary Under-21 B Hurling Championship (4) 1981, 1986, 1990, 2009 (as Shannon Rovers Gaels)
- North Tipperary Under-21 C Hurling Championship (1) 2003
- North Tipperary Under-21 B Football Championship (2) 1991, 2016 (as Shannon Rovers Gaels)
- North Tipperary Minor A Hurling Championship (1) 1957 (with Borrisokane)
- Tipperary Minor B Hurling Championship (1) 2008 (as Shannon Rovers Gaels)
- North Tipperary Minor B Hurling Championship (2) 1984, 2008 (as Shannon Rovers Gaels)
- Tipperary Minor C Hurling Championship (1) 2002
- North Tipperary Minor C Hurling Championship (2) 2002, 2010 (as Shannon Rovers Gaels)
- Tipperary Minor B Football Championship (1) 1989 (as Shannon Rovers Gaels)

== Notable players ==
- Pat McLoughney
- George Hannigan
- Alan Byrne
