= Kingdom of Ormond =

Regional kingdom in Gaelic Ireland

Ormond Urumhain
- 1118–1328
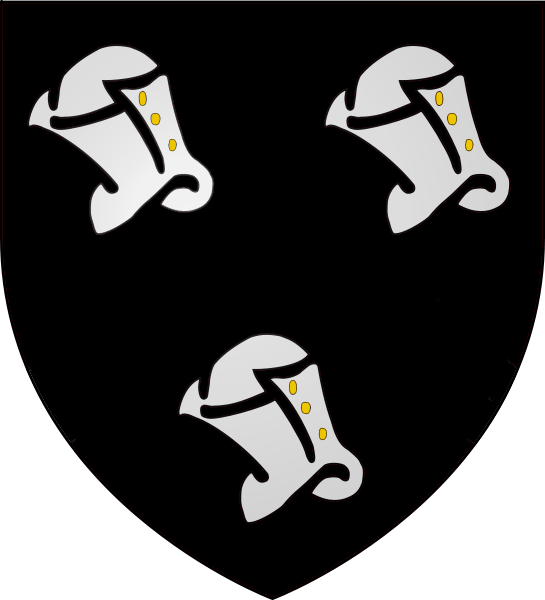
- Coat of arms
- Common languages: Middle Irish, Latin
- Religion: Celtic Christianity, Catholic Christianity
- Government: Tanistry
  - to 1164: Olaf Húa Ua Cennétig
  - unknown: Tomás Ua Cennétig (half king)
- History
  - Established: 1118
  - Disestablished: 1328
Preceded by	Succeeded by
Kingdom of Munster; Kingdom of Ossory	Lordship of Ireland; Earldom of Ormond
- Today part of: Ireland

The Kingdom of Ormond (Modern Irish: Urumhain – "East Munster") was a short-lived kingdom in medieval Ireland. It existed in the 12th century, comprising the eastern part of Munster, in what is now most of County Tipperary, as well as adjoining parts of Leinster (western County Kilkenny and northern County Waterford).

Ormond was formed from a partition of the preceding Kingdom of Munster. It was a fief of the O'Kennedy family and later invaded by the Anglo-Normans, who created the Earldom of Ormond as part of the Lordship of Ireland, under the suzerainty of the Butler family. However, the O'Kennedys, now styled "Lords of Ormond", long struggled with the Butlers for control of the region. Ormond later included a part of the former Kingdom of Ossory (which had comprised all of the future County Kilkenny, along with western Laois and parts of eastern Tipperary)

In 1336, a peace treaty was signed between the two families, but in 1347 the O'Kennedys were able to drive out the Butlers from Nenagh Castle and install there, keeping the manor for more than two hundred years.

Two modern Irish baronies, Ormond Upper and Ormond Lower, are named after the kingdom.

== Kings of Ormond ==
- Olaf Húa Ua Cennétig (...-1164)
- Domnall Húa Ua Cennétig (...-1181)
- Brian Ua Cennétig
- Tomás Ua Cennétig, half-king of Ormond
