= Shinrone =

Village in County Offaly, Ireland

Shinrone Suí an Róin
- Village
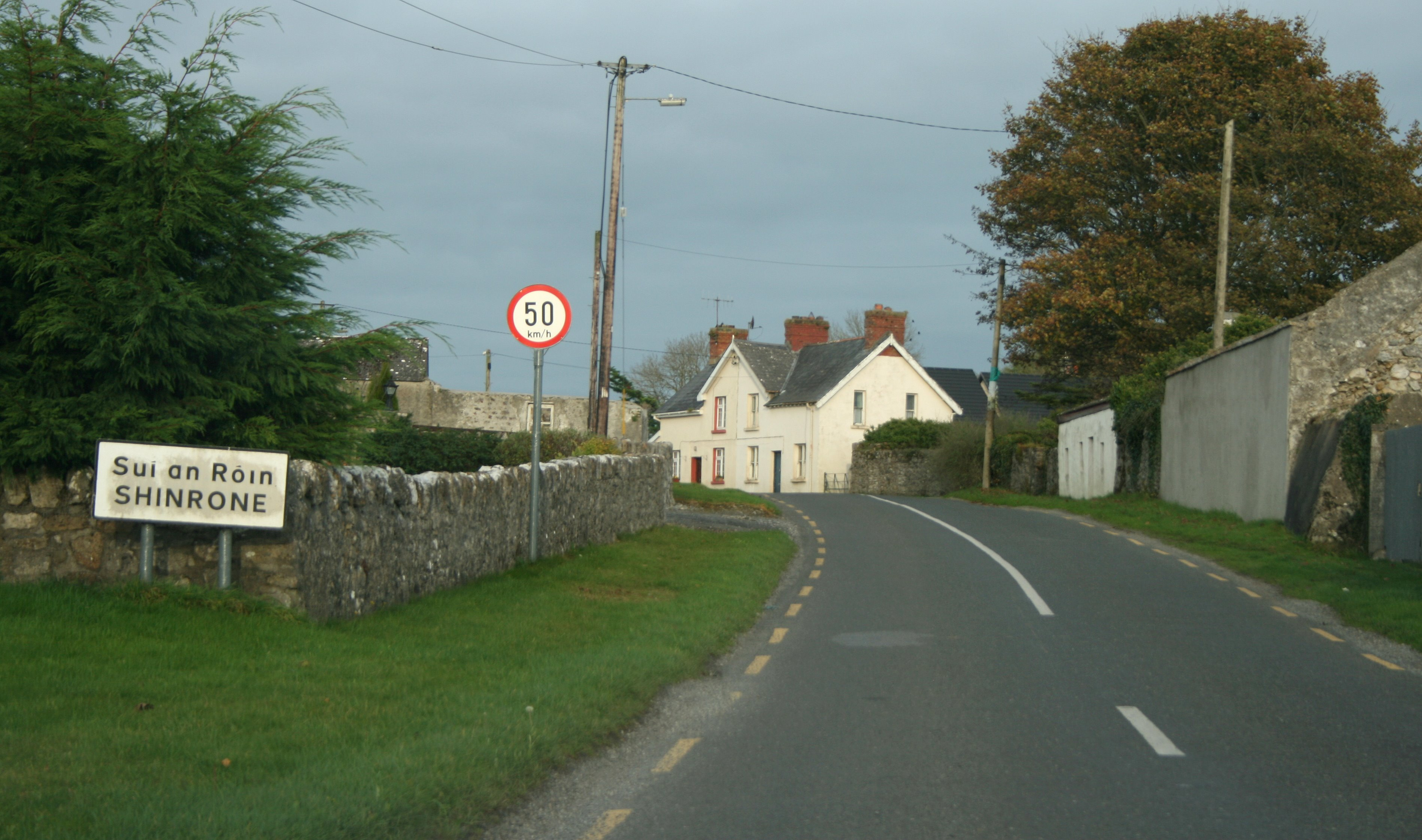
- Shinrone on the R491, County Offaly

- Location in Ireland
- Coordinates: 52°59′03″N 7°55′29″W
- Country: Ireland
- Province: Leinster
- County: County Offaly
- Elevation: 66 m (217 ft)

Population (2016)
  - Total: 645
- Time zone: UTC+0 (WET)
  - Summer (DST): UTC-1 (IST (WEST))
- Irish Grid Reference: S049923

Shinrone (Irish: Suí an Róin, meaning 'Róin's seat/retreat') is a village in County Offaly, Ireland. It is in the southernmost part of the county, situated very close to the border with County Tipperary. It lies at the junction of the R491 regional road between Nenagh and Roscrea with the R492 to Sharavogue. At the 2016 census, the village population was 645. The village is in a townland and civil parish of the same name.

== Location ==
Shinrone is located at the southern tip of County Offaly, along the border with County Tipperary. While the majority of Shinrone Catholic parish is in Offaly, a small portion of the parish lies in Tipperary, including the village of Ballingarry.

Towns and villages near Shinrone include Roscrea (8 km), Birr (14 km), Cloughjordan (9 km), Moneygall and Borrisokane (13 km).

== Sport ==
There are two GAA clubs in Shinrone parish: Shinrone GAA is the club on the Offaly side of the parish and Knockshegowna GAA on the Tipperary side. Hurling is the dominant sport played in Shinrone, like most South Offaly GAA clubs. Shinrone won the 2022 Offaly Senior Hurling Championship, beating Kilcormac–Killoughey GAA in the final.

== Architecture ==
A number of buildings of architectural interest in and around Shinrone are listed on the National Inventory of Architectural Heritage website, including:

- Cangort Castle - destroyed by Cromwellian forces in the 17th century. A gatehouse building remains.
- Annaghbrook House (c. 1720) Previously derelict house with some features of architectural merit being renovated.
- Tierney's, Main St. (c. 1750, renovated c. 1860) Two-storey house with pub. Steeply pitched roof with terracotta ridge tiles.
- Bridge over a tributary of the Little Brosna River, Main St (c. 1820) Double arch bridge. Eastern arch has been converted to a pedestrian underpass.
- Bellefield House is a property belonging to the Royal Horticultural Society of Ireland. Its walled garden of two acres has important collections of trees, bulbs, and perennials.
- St Mary's Church of Ireland (1821) Commissioned by the Board of First Fruits this church has a wider nave than usual.
- Shinrone Roman Catholic Church (c. 1860, renovated c. 1980) T-plan church with cross finials on gables.

== Transport ==
As at 2021 Local Link Tipperary operates a bus service between Roscrea railway station and Nenagh which stops at Shinrone Post Office. The service operates daily.

The nearest train stations to Shinrone are at Roscrea and Cloughjordan, both on the Limerick–Ballybrophy railway line.

== Culture ==
Shinrone Community Centre has hosted notable international musicians including Arlo Guthrie in 1988, The Pogues and Shane MacGowan, Christy Moore, The Waterboys and Nanci Griffith. The Pogues and Shane MacGowan played in Shinrone numerous times, and many dubbed Shinrone as MacGowans home venue, as it was just a short distance from his native Tipperary. Shinrone is referenced in the Pogues song "The Broad Majestic Shannon".

Arlo Guthrie's visit to Shinrone is mentioned in Tim Winton's novel The Riders - shortlisted for the Booker Prize in 1995. A character in the novel overhears locals in the small Irish village of Shinrone recount the night Guthrie came to play. The actual event was Guthrie's 1988 community centre concert.

Shinrone appeared in the titles of the satirical RTÉ television series Hall's Pictorial Weekly on 12 March 1980.

== People ==
American President Barack Obama's earliest known relative, Joseph Kearney, whose family subsequently moved to Moneygall and who would become the President's 7th great-grandfather, was from Shinrone where the Kearney family lived and died for four generations. Research from Trinity college shows this to be the President's earliest known relative.

Irish-born soldier, physician, and politician Edward Hand was born in Clyduff, King's County (now County Offaly) on 31 December 1744 and baptised in Shinrone. Hand served in the Continental Army during the American Revolutionary War, rising to the rank of Major-General, and later was a member of several Pennsylvania governmental bodies.

The Irish Poet and Writer T. W. Rolleston was born in extinct townland of Glasshouse right outside of Shinrone on May 1st 1857.

== Education ==
There are two primary Schools located in the Parish. Shinrone National School, which is in the village, and Clonlisk National School, located outside the village.

Pupils from Shinrone usually attend Secondary School in either St Brendan's Community School in Birr, Colaiste Pobal Ros Cre, or Borrisokane Vocational School. The village is also very close to the Cistercian College, Roscrea, with some students attending.
