= R490 road (Ireland) =

Road in Ireland

R490 road
- Bóthar R490
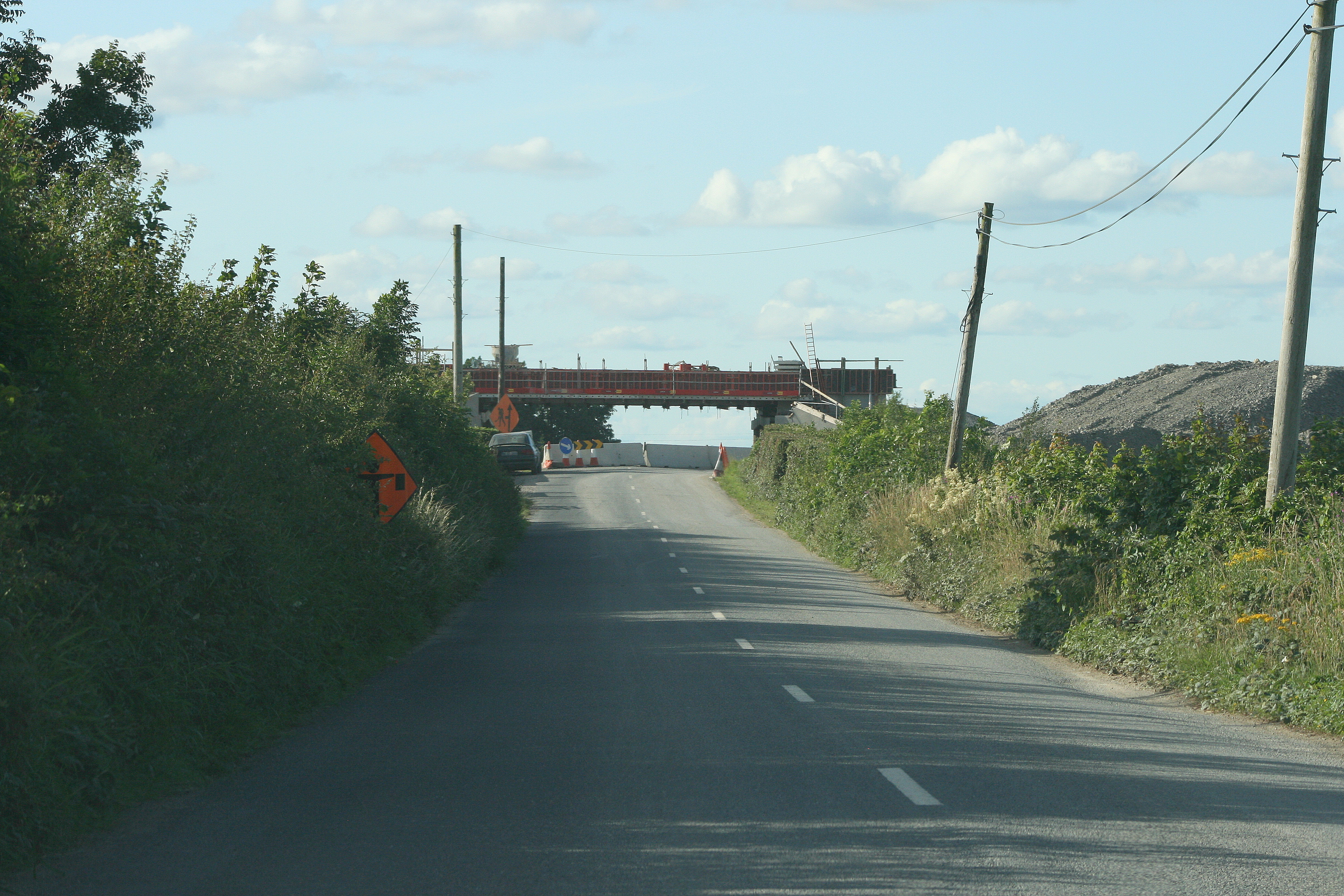
- R490 M7 motorway overbridge under construction, July 2009

Route information
- Length: 20 km (12 mi)

Location
- Country: Ireland
- Primary destinations: County Tipperary; Borrisokane - Starts at the N52; Crosses the Ballyfinboy River twice; Modreeny; Crosses the Ballyfinboy River a further three times.; Cloughjordan - (R491); Passes over the Limerick-Ballybrophy railway line; County Offaly; Crosses the Ballyfinboy River once again.; Passes under the M7 motorway; Terminates in Moneygall at the R445

Highway system
- Roads in Ireland; Motorways; Primary; Secondary; Regional

The R490 is a regional road in Ireland linking the N52 at Borrisokane, County Tipperary via Cloughjordan to the R445 at Moneygall, County Offaly. The road is approximately 20 km (12 mi) long and crosses the Ballyfinboy River six times.

== See also ==
- Roads in Ireland - (Primary National Roads)
- Secondary Roads
