= Townfields =

Townland in County Tipperary, Ireland

Townfields (Irish: Páirceanna an Bhaile) is the townland in County Tipperary, Ireland that includes most of the town of Cloughjordan including Cloughjordan railway station. It is in the Barony of Ormond Lower. Not to be confused with Townsfield, a residential development off the Templemore Road in Cloughjordan.
