= Firgrove, County Tipperary =

Townland in County Tipperary, Ireland

Coordinates: 52.9820°N 8.2190°W

Firgrove (Irish: An Claí Fada) is a townland in the Barony of Ormond Lower, County Tipperary, Ireland. Firgrove is located approximately 6 km west of Borrisokane.
