= Cowbawn =

Townland in County Tipperary, Ireland

Cowbawn (Irish: Bán na mBó) is a townland in the Barony of Ormond Lower, County Tipperary, Ireland. It is located north of Cloughjordan.
