= Cloghjordanpark =

Townland in County Tipperary, Ireland

Coordinates: 52.943251°N 8.022709°W

Cloghjordanpark (Irish: Páirc Chloch Shiurdáin), A townland in the Barony of Ormond Lower, County Tipperary, Ireland. Located to the east of Cloughjordan, the townland is always spelled without the letter "u."

Deerpark House appears on North Tipperary County Council's Record of Protected Structures (ref S117)
