= Ballyquirk =

Townland in County Tipperary, Ireland

Coordinates: 53.072°N 8.151°W

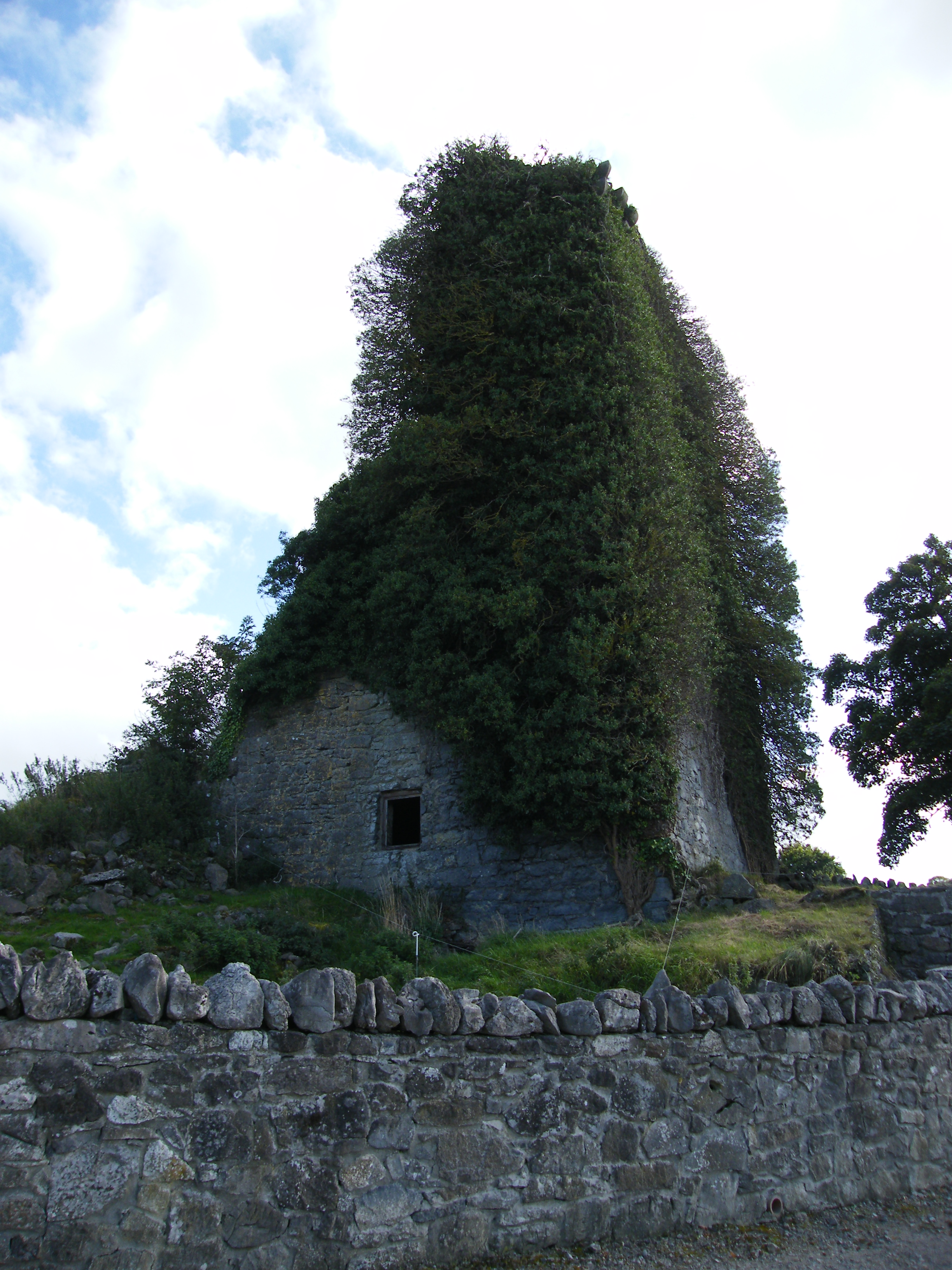
Ballyquirk Castle ruins

Ballyquirk (Irish: Baile Uí Chuirc) is a townland in the Barony of Ormond Lower, County Tipperary, Ireland. It is located in the civil parish of Lorrha, north of Carrigahorig.

Ballyquirk Castle, located in the townland, is a single storey over basement property with three bays and a rear tower. It is all that is left following alterations made in the nineteenth century to the original two storey over basement property which featured four towers. Ruins of an earlier castle stand nearby. The castle appears on North Tipperary County Council's Record of Protected Structures (ref S69)

The woods at Ballyquirk form a part of Borrisokane Forest which consists of several widely dispersed small areas of woodland managed by Coillte, the state sponsored forestry company.

== See also ==
- Carrigahorig, a small hamlet partially in the townland
