= Johnstown, Killodiernan =

Townland in County Tipperary, Ireland

Coordinates: 52.946275°N 8.250703°W

Johnstown (Irish: Baile Sheáin) is a townland in the Barony of Ormond Lower, County Tipperary, Ireland. It is located in the civil parish of Killodiernan.

== Buildings of note ==
Two buildings within the townland are listed as protected structures by Tipperary County Council (RPS Ref S192 and S191).

Killodiernan Church of Ireland, built 1811 of rubble stone with a four pinnacle tower and white brick dressing around the windows and the Gateway of the former Johnstown house with three arches in the Neo-Classical style.
