= Owney and Arra =

Barony in County Tipperary, Ireland

Owney and Arra (Irish: Uaithne agus Ara) is a barony in County Tipperary, Ireland. This geographical unit of land is one of 12 baronies in County Tipperary. Its chief town is Newport. The barony lies between Ormond Lower to the north (whose chief town is Nenagh), Kilnamanagh Upper to the south (whose chief town is Borrisoleigh) and Ormond Upper to the east (whose chief town is Toomevara). To the west lies the River Shannon which separates it from County Clare. The territory is currently administered by Tipperary County Council.

== Legal context ==
Baronies were created after the Norman invasion of Ireland as divisions of counties and were used the administration of justice and the raising of revenue. While baronies continue to be officially defined units, they have been administratively obsolete since 1898. However, they continue to be used in land registration and in specification, such as in planning permissions. In many cases, a barony corresponds to an earlier Gaelic túath which had submitted to the Crown. The Ó Maoilriains displaced the Ó hIfearnáin family from the area and established a lordship there in the later middle-ages.

== Modern times ==
When County Tipperary was split into North and South Ridings in 1836, Owney and Arra was allocated to the north riding. However, the neighbouring barony of Kilnamanagh was split into Upper and Lower half-baronies, being allocated to the north and south ridings respectively.

== Towns, villages and townlands of the barony ==
Newtown, Newport, Portroe, Rearcross.

=== Civil parishes of the barony ===
This table lists an historical geographical sub-division of the barony known as the civil parish (not to be confused with an Ecclesiastical parish).

Name in Irish	Name in English
Baile an Chaisleáin	Castletownarra
An Bhuirgéis	Burgesbeg
Cill Chomnaid	Kilcomenty
Cill Mhac Stola	Kilmastulla
Cill Mhealláin	Kilvellane
Cill na Rátha	Kilnarath
Cill Ó Scolaí	Killoscully
Eochaill	Youghalarra
Maigh Saotha	Monsea
Mainistir Uaithne	(part of) Abington
An Sráidbhaile	Stradbally
Teampall an Chalaidh	Templeachally

Note: Three townlands of the civil parish of Monsea lie in the barony with the bulk of the civil parish lying in the barony of Ormond Lower.

== See also ==
- List of civil parishes of County Tipperary
