= R492 road (Ireland) =

Road in County Offaly, Ireland

R492 road
- Bóthar R492

Route information
- Length: 6 km (3.7 mi)

Location
- Country: Ireland
- Primary destinations: County Offaly; Shinrone - Starts at junction with R491; Crosses the Little Brosna River; Terminates at the N62 at Sharavogue between Roscrea and Birr

Highway system
- Roads in Ireland; Motorways; Primary; Secondary; Regional

The R492 is a regional road in County Offaly linking Shinrone to the N62 at Sharavogue between Roscrea and Birr. The road is approximately 6 km (3.7 mi) long.

The road traverses two bridges listed as being of architectural and technical interest. The first is Sharavogue Bridge which carries the road over the Little Brosna River and the second, a single arched bridge over the now disused Roscrea and Parsonstown Railway line.

== See also ==
- Roads in Ireland - (Primary National Roads)
- Secondary Roads
- Regional Roads
