= William Archer Butler =

Irish historian

William Archer Butler (c. 1814 – 5 July 1848) was an Irish historian of philosophy.

== Life ==
He was born at Annerville, near Clonmel in Ireland. His father was a Protestant, his mother a Roman Catholic, and he was brought up as a Catholic. As a boy he was imaginative and poetical, and some of his early verses were remarkable. While yet at Clonmel school he became a Protestant. Later he entered and was educated at Trinity College, Dublin. where he had a brilliant career. He specially devoted himself to literature and metaphysics, and was noted for the beauty of his style. In 1834 he gained the ethical moderatorship, newly instituted by Provost Lloyd, and continued in residence at college. In 1837 he decided to enter the Church, and in the same year he was elected to the professorship of moral philosophy, specially founded for him through Lloyd's exertions.

About the same time he was presented to the prebend of Clondahorky, Donegal, and resided there when not called by his professorial duties to Dublin. In 1842 he was promoted to the rectory of Raymochy. He died on 5 July 1848.

== Works ==
His Sermons (2 vols., 1849) were brilliant and forceful. The Lectures on the History of Ancient Philosophy, edited by W. Hepworth Thompson (2 vols., 1856; 2nd ed., 1 vol. 1875) were among the few British works on the history of philosophy. These works include introductory lectures, the early Greek thinkers, and lectures on Plato.

Among his other writings were papers in the Dublin University Magazine (1834–1837); and "Letters on Development" (in the Irish Ecclesiastical Journal, 1845), a reply to Newman's famous Essay on the Development of Christian Doctrine.
