= Kilbarron, County Tipperary =

Civil parish in County Tipperary, Ireland

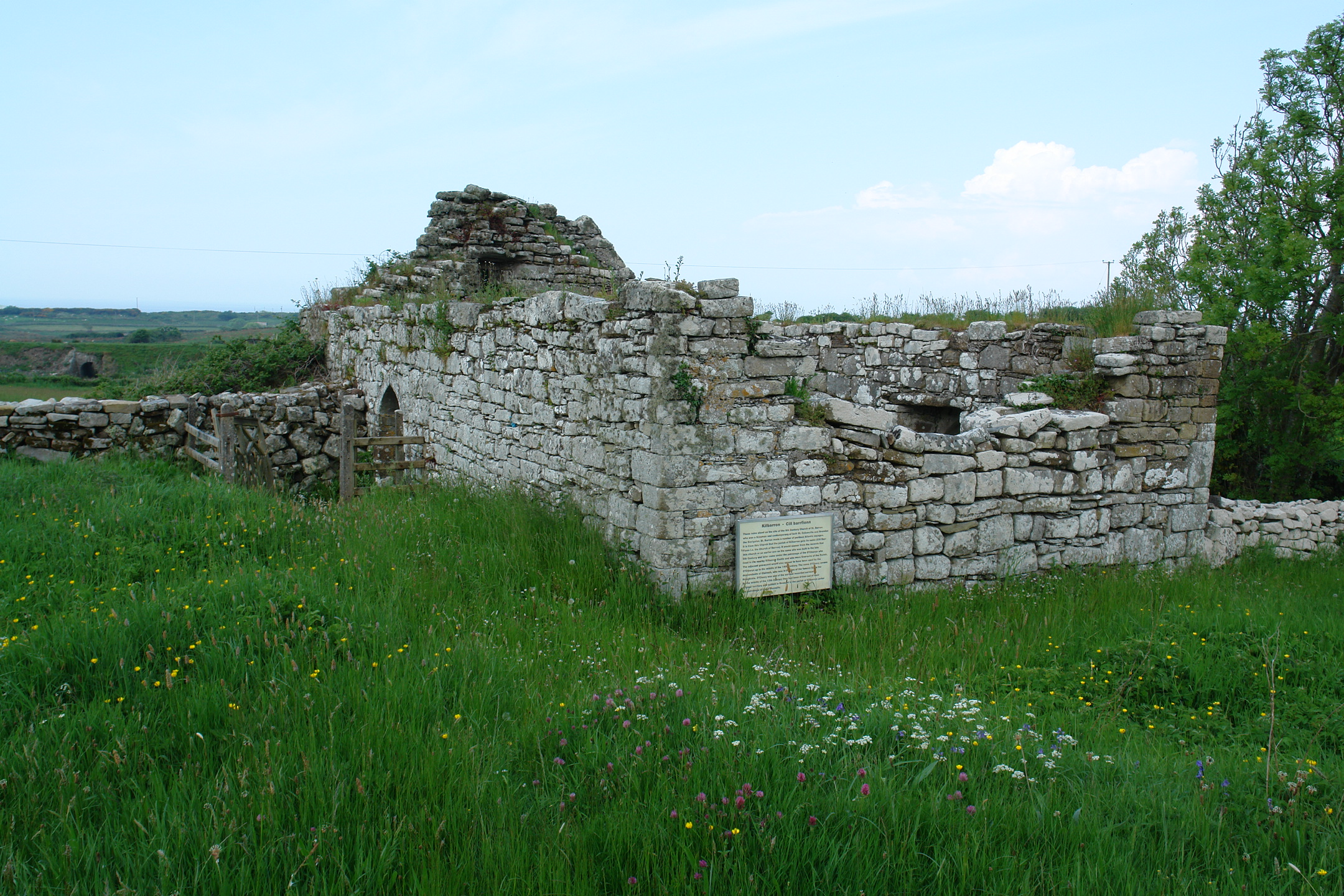
Ruins of church in Kilbarron

Kilbarron (Irish: Cill Bharráin) is a civil parish and a townland in the historical barony of Ormond Lower, County Tipperary in Ireland. It is located west of Borrisokane.

The woods at Kilbarron form a part of Borrisokane Forest which consists of several widely dispersed small areas of woodland managed by Coillte, the state sponsored forestry company.

The Dáil constituency of Offaly incorporates twenty four electoral divisions from Tipperary North including Kilbarron.

== See also ==
- List of civil parishes of County Tipperary
