= Willsborough =

Townland in County Tipperary, Ireland

Coordinates: 52.952°N 8.164°W

Willsborough is a small townland in the Barony of Ormond Lower, County Tipperary, Ireland. It is approximately 0.33 square kilometres (0.13 sq mi) in area and located in the civil parish of Ardcrony. Although the Placenames Database of Ireland gives Willsborough as the Irish language name, 19th century records indicate that the area was formerly known as Derrynashig.
