= James Doorley =

Assistant director

James Doorley is deputy director at the National Youth Council of Ireland.

He has been a member of the Member of the National Economic and Social Council since 2011. He is the current chairperson of Podiatry Ireland. He is also a member of the Dental Council. and the Dental Council's Fitness to Practice Committee. He served as Chairman of the Consumer's Association of Ireland from 2007 until 2010. He was the Irish representative on the European Consumer Consultative Group. from 2010 until 2013. From 2012 until 2016 he served as a member of the board of the Property Services Regulatory Authority. He was a member of the Consumer Panel of the Financial Regulator from 2005 to 2010.

He was formerly a Trustee of the Carnegie Trust for the UK and Ireland. from 2004 until 2015. He also previously served as Vice President of the European Youth Forum. from 2004 to 2006.

He was an independent candidate for the National University of Ireland Seanad Éireann constituency in 2011 receiving 655 first preference votes.

Originally from Borrisokane, County Tipperary, he is a Tipperary hurling supporter. He currently lives in Ashbourne, County Meath.
