= Monsea =

Civil parish in County Tipperary, Ireland

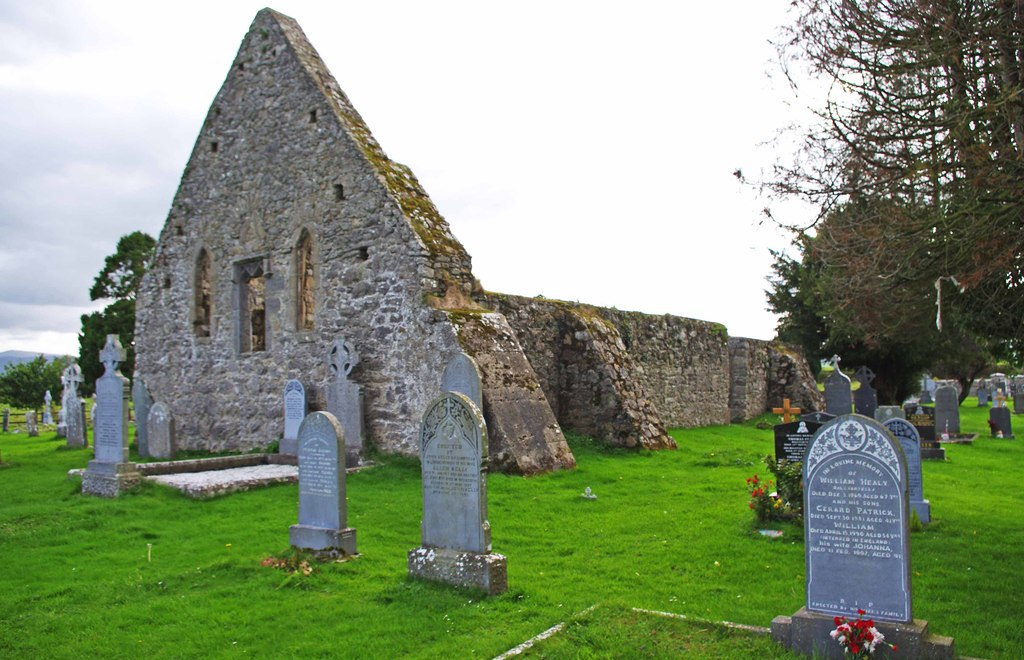
Former Monsea Church

Monsea (Maigh Saotha in Irish) is a civil parish and townland in the Baronies of Ormond Lower and Owney and Arra in County Tipperary, Ireland. Nine of the townlands within the civil parish (including Monsea townland) are located in Ormond Lower with three townlands located in Owney and Arra.

The civil parish of Monsea is in the Dáil constituency of Offaly which incorporates 24 electoral divisions that were previously in the Tipperary North Dáil constituency.
