= R491 road (Ireland) =

Road in Ireland

R491 road
- Bóthar R491
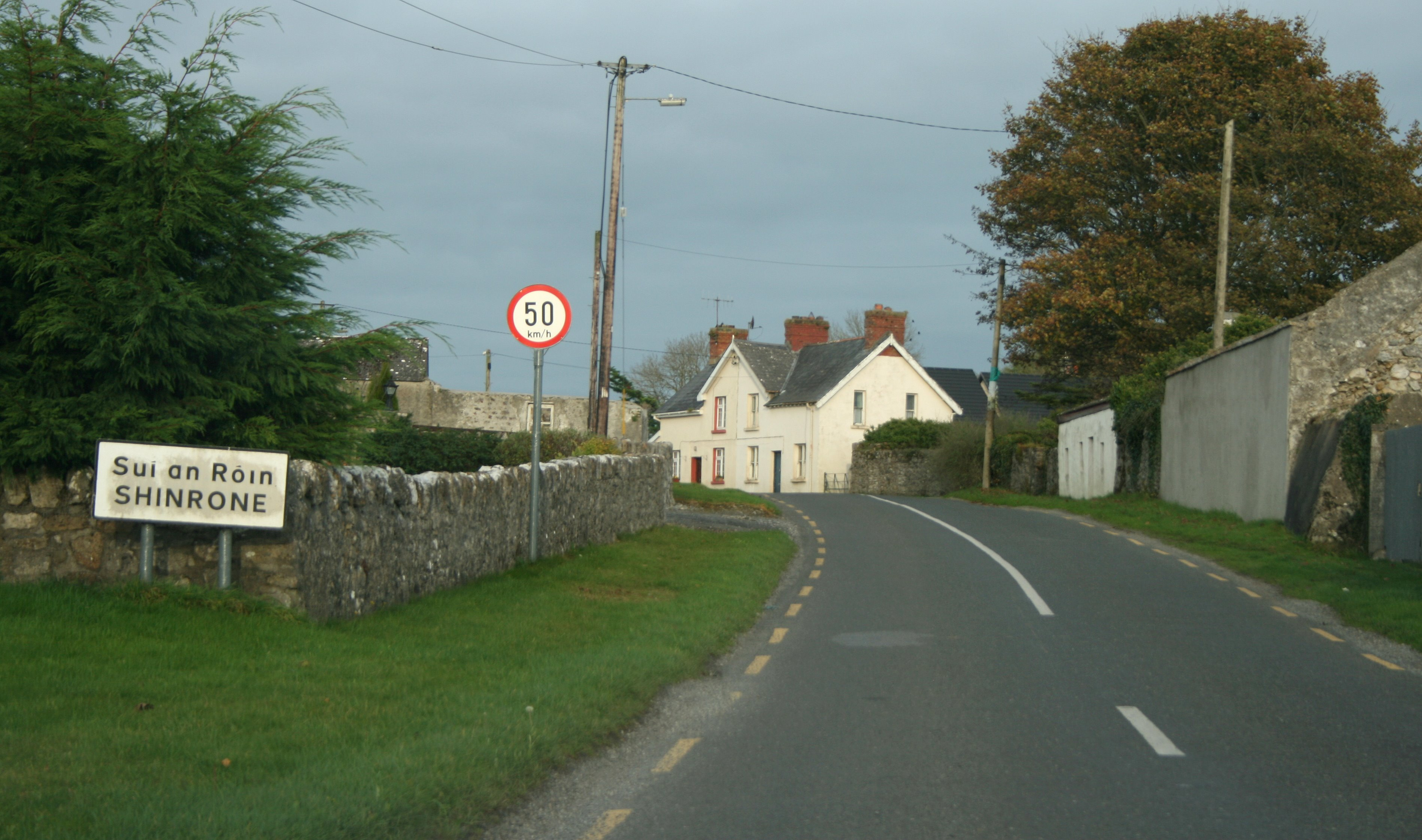
- Approaching Shinrone from the west on the R491

Route information
- Length: 57 km (35 mi)

Location
- Country: Ireland
- Primary destinations: County Tipperary; Nenagh - Starts at the R445; Crosses the Ollatrim River; Passes over the Limerick-Ballybrophy railway line; County Offaly; Crosses the Ballyfinboy River; County Tipperary; Cloughjordan - (R490); County Offaly; Shinrone - (R492); Crosses the Little Brosna River; County Tipperary; Passes over the Limerick-Ballybrophy railway line; Terminates in Roscrea

Highway system
- Roads in Ireland; Motorways; Primary; Secondary; Regional

The R491 is a regional road in Ireland linking Nenagh, County Tipperary via Cloughjordan and Shinrone to Roscrea, County Tipperary. The road is approximately 37 km (23 mi) long.

== See also ==
- Roads in Ireland - (Primary National Roads)
- Secondary Roads
