= O'Kennedy =

Irish royal dynasty of the Middle Ages

Kennedy Ó Cinnéide
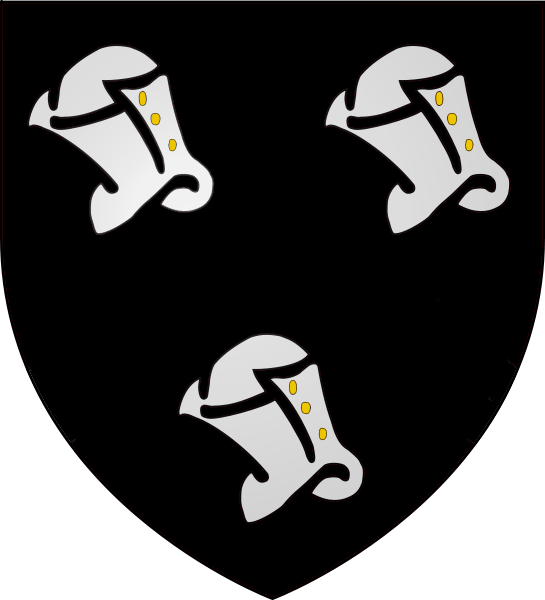
- The three helmets on the coat of arms represent the Fionn, Donn and Ruadh branches.
- Country: Kingdom of Ormond
- Titles: Lords of Ormond
- Cadet branches: Ó Cinnéide Fionn; Ó Cinnéide Donn; Ó Cinnéide Ruadh

The O'Kennedy family (Irish: Ó Cinnéide), sometimes Kennedy, were an Irish noble dynasty, a sept of the Dál gCais, founded in the Middle Ages who were Kings of Ormond. Their founder was the nephew of High King Brian Boru (1002–1014). The name Cinnéide belonged to Brian Boru's father Cennétig mac Lorcáin, King of Thomond, in the tenth century AD. (Brian Boru was an Ard Rí or High King of Ireland). The Kennedys did not descend directly from Brian Boru, but from Cinnéide's eldest son Donncuan. Donncuan's son Mahon was the first to call himself Ó Cinnéide which is Irish for grandson of Cinnéide.

According to historian C. Thomas Cairney, the O'Kennedys were one of the chiefly families of the Dal gCais or Dalcassians who were a tribe of the Erainn who were the second wave of Celts to settle in Ireland between about 500 and 100 BC.

== History ==
Prior to the availability of DNA testing in 2004 it was a general assumption that all Irish Kennedys were related. Current Y DNA testing proves that there were earlier Irish Kennedy ancestors who were genetically separate from the Dál gCais and their Clare origins. Some current North Tipperary Kennedys are descended from the Muscraige Tire tribe around Lorrha in the 10th and 11th centuries and have different Y DNA from the Dál gCais. The Dalcassian Kennedys belonged to the powerful Dál gCais people of Thomond, headed by the O'Briens. They resided in far eastern Clare, northern Limerick, Mayo, and northern Tipperary in an area called Ormond. Originally seated in Glemor, near Killaloe in County Clare, they migrated across the river Shannon to Ormond in County Tipperary following pressure from other septs in the region (mainly the O'Briens and the McNamaras) in the 12th century. They soon grew in power to become lords in Ormond from the 11th to 16th centuries. The Annals of the Four Masters described them in 1300 to be "the undisputed Lords of Ormond".

Placenames such as Coolkennedy and Garrykennedy in Upper Ormond and Killokennedy in Thomond are indicative of their longstanding presence in the region.

The sept split into three branches, the chiefs of which were referred to by their hair colours: don (brown), fionn (blond), and rua (red). St Ruadhan of Lorrha was the special protector of the Kennedys of Ormond. Around 1600, a branch of the sept migrated to County Antrim where many Kennedys are still found today.

According to Daithi O'hOgain (Associate Professor at University College Dublin), there is a lineage of Irish Kennedys descended directly from Brian Boru: "The name Cinneide also continued in the direct O'Brien line. For instance, a branch of the family descended from King Donnchadh, son of Brian Boru, settled in Aherloe in south Tipperary, one section of which had the name Cinneide as a surname. Another Cinneide O'Briain, grandson of the same Donnchadh, was a strong opponent of his kinsman, King Toirdhealbhach, and on this account he was assisted by the Connacht king, Aedh O'Ruairc of Breffny, to set up a kingdom of his own on the Meath-Cavan border. This little kingdom was broken up by Toirdhealbhach's army in 1080, and Cinneide O'Briain himself was slain in 1084 at the Battle of Monecronock, near Leixlip in Count Kildare. The connection with the O'Rourkes of Breffny did not end, however, for people bearing the name Cinneide settled in that area of County Leitrim. These were known by the synonym Muimhneach ("Munster-man"), which is anglicised as the surnames Mimnagh and Minnagh."

To add to the confusion, there are the Kennedys of nine-county Ulster in the north of Ireland. The Kennedys who settled in Ulster are mostly of Scottish origin from the territories of Galloway and Ayr just across the Irish Sea 20 miles (32 km) away. Many Scottish Kennedys were planters in Ulster, and many Scots went south to Dublin and mingled with the Irish clan.

In the aftermath of the Black Death, there was a Gaelic resurgence in Ireland as the plague more heavily hit the Normans in the urbanised areas. The main rivals of the O'Kennedys were the Norman-descended Butlers who were Earls of Ormond (a title of the Lordship of Ireland). The two families signed a peace treaty in 1336, followed by another in 1347. The latter was broken when the O'Kennedys, with their Irish allies, the O'Briens and O'Carrolls, attacked and burned Nenagh. The O'Kennedys were able to use the Butler–FitzGerald dispute to attack the Butlers whenever they were overstretched by attacks from the Earl of Desmond. The O'Kennedys and their native Irish allies were able to drive the Butler dynasty out from Nenagh Castle in 1391 and set themselves up there (these Butlers moved out to Kilkenny Castle).

In 2011, Australian author and historian Brian Patrick Kennedy organised the first Kennedy clan gathering in Rearcross, Co. Tipperary. This gathering was to become an annual event, and in July 2015, the Irish Kennedy Heritage Group was formally inaugurated. Rody Kennedy was elected as Chief of the Kennedy clan, while Brian Patrick Kennedy was appointed as seanchai, or historian. In 2016, a Kennedy family display was opened in the Heritage Centre at Nenagh. Chief Rody Kennedy died on 16 November 2022. The Kennedys continue to organise events in Tipperary on an annual basis, with the most recent gathering having taken place in July 2025.

A branch of the Irish Kennedy family came to Portugal in the person of Daniel Kennedy, establishing himself here his descendants, of which passed a branch to Brazil. Daniel Kennedy belonged to the Army of the Duke of Wellington. He distinguished himself at the Battle of Roliça in 1808, in the attack on Porto in 1809 and, mostly, at the Battle of Bussaco in 1810, in order to deserve commendations from the Commander of the Anglo-Portuguese Army. He had the post of Captain. Wellington made it know in special his feats in the office he sent to Dom Miguel Pereira Forjaz, Minister of War, with date of 30 September 1810, in which he reports the great Battle of Bussaco, office which was published in the "Lisbon Gazette" of the same year of 1810, in Nr. 237. He was father of the painter William then Guilherme Kennedy (1805-1829), who died in Lisbon, leaving all his paintings to the Collegium of the Inglesinhos, and paternal grandfather of the famous pianist Mariana Kennedy (1828-1870). They use as arms: sable, three helmets argent, set 2 and 1, and a scallop or in abyss; crest: an arm armed argent, wielding a cutless argent, garnished or. They bring as motto: GALEA SPES SALUTIS.

== Castles ==
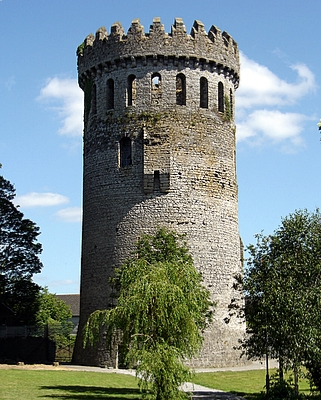
Nenagh Castle: the O'Kennedys struggled with the Butlers for control.

The Kennedys' castles in Ireland were all located near Nenagh in County Tipperary. The following castles were built by, or held by the Kennedys:

- Ballintotty Castle
- Ballycapple Castle
- Dromineer Castle
- Garrykennedy Castle
- Lackeen Castle
- Nenagh Castle
- Knigh Castle
- Urra Castle
- Ballyartella Castle

As well as this there were castles at Glenahilty, Kilmochnage, Bawndownmore, Carrigichonigrick, Swyffine, Beallachavvine, Ballingarry, Lackeen, Ballycappel, Annagh, Ballaghfymoye, Ballyquirke, Kilcarron, Rathurles, Dunally and Castle Otway.

== Arms ==
- Sable three helmets in profile Argent.

== See also ==
- Irish clans
- Kennedy family
