= Sharavogue =

Townland in County Offaly, Ireland

Coordinates: 53°02′N 7°55′W

Sharavogue (Searbhóg in Irish) is a townland in the historical Barony of Clonlisk, County Offaly, Ireland. It is a rural area located near the junction of the N52 road and the R492 between Roscrea and Birr. The Little Brosna River flows under Sharavogue bridge.

== Structures of note ==
Sharavogue House is no longer in existence, having been burned down in the 1920s however the remaining gate lodge and stable yard are both listed as being of architectural merit.

Sharavogue Bridge built in the early 1850s carries the R492 road over the Little Brosna River which here forms the boundary between the townlands of Sharavogue and Ballincor Demesne. The bridge is listed as being of architectural and technical interest.

A single arched bridge carries the R492 road over the now disused Roscrea and Parsonstown Railway line. This bridge, constructed about 1858, is also listed as being of architectural and technical interest.

== Sharavogue bog ==
Sharavogue bog is a raised bog situated on the flood plain of the Little Brosna River. It is an example of a type of habitat that is becoming increasingly rare in Ireland and Europe and is on the list of Special Areas of Conservation as listed by the National Parks and Wildlife Service operating under the aegis of the Department of Arts, Heritage and the Gaeltacht. The Special Areas of Conservation are part of the European Union's Natura 2000 network of sites with special flora or fauna.
