= Dorrha =

Civil parish in County Tipperary, Ireland

Dorrha (Irish: Dura) is a civil parish in the historical barony of Ormond Lower, County Tipperary, Ireland. It is located in the extreme north of County Tipperary and includes the settlement of Rathcabbin.

== See also ==
- List of civil parishes of County Tipperary
