= John Francis Waller =

Irish poet and editor

John Francis Waller (21 July 1809 – 19 January 1894) was an Irish poet, librettist and editor.

== Life ==
The son of Thomas Maunsell Waller, of an Irish baronetical family, and Margaret Vereker, Waller was born in Finnoe, County Tipperary, studied at Trinity College, Dublin (BA, 1831) and was called to the Irish Bar in 1833. Under the pseudonym of "Jonathan Freke Slingsby" he wrote for the Dublin University Magazine and became its editor in 1845. He held the position of vice-president of the Royal Irish Academy from 1864 and was appointed Registrar of the Rolls Court in 1867. His older brother was Edward Waller (zoologist) 1804–1873.

== Works ==
Besides editing the Dublin University Magazine, he also edited the Imperial Dictionary of Universal Biography and contributed articles to Cassell's Biographical Dictionary.

Waller published several volumes of poems and also wrote the words to many popular songs, including Cushla Ma Chree, The Spinning Wheel and Song of the Glass. Many of his odes and poems were set to music by Irish composers, including Joseph Robinson, James Cooksey Culwick, Robert Prescott Stewart, Michael William Balfe, and George Alexander Osborne, Stewart being particularly fond of his works. He also wrote words for compositions by George Alexander Macfarren, Charles Oberthür, and Franz Wilhelm Abt. He was responsible for the explanatory notes and a life of the author in a new edition of "Gulliver's Travels" written by Dean Jonathan Swift.

== Selected works ==
Prose

- Ravenscroft Hall (1852)
- The Dead Bridal (1856)
- Peter Brown (1872)

Librettos

- Inauguration Ode for the Opening of the National Exhibition of Cork (music by R.P. Stewart) (1852)
- A Winter Night's Wake (music by R.P. Stewart) (1858)
- The Eve of St. John (music by R.P. Stewart) (1860)
- Ode for the Installation of the Earl of Rosse as Chancellor of the University of Dublin (music by R.P. Stewart) (1863)

Editorships

- Gulliver's Travels (1864)
- Goldsmith's Works (1864/65)

== Bibliography ==
- "Our Portrait Gallery: John Francis Waller", in: Dublin University Magazine 495:83 (March 1874), pp. 312–316.
- "Late John Francis Waller, LL.D., of Finnoe, Tipperary", in: Irish Builder 36:836 (15 October 1894), p. 235.

== Arms ==
Coat of arms of John Francis Waller
Notes Confirmed 8 March 1861 by Sir John Bernard Burke, Ulster King of Arms. Crest Out of a ducal coronet Or an eagle's leg Gules in front of a plume of five ostrich feather the first third and fifth Argent the second and fourth Azure. Escutcheon Quarterly 1st & 4th Sable three walnut leaves Or between two bendlets Argent 2nd & 3rd chequy Or and Azure on a canton Gules a lion rampant double queued of the first over all in the centre point a mullet Ermine. Motto Honor Et Veritas
