= Uskane =

Townland in County Tipperary, Ireland

Uskane (Uisceán in Irish) is a townland, a civil parish in the historical barony of Ormond Lower and an Electoral division in County Tipperary in Ireland.

== Building of note ==
Uskane House, a four bay, three storey home with two chimneys at each end gable. It is listed as a protected structure by Tipperary County Council (RPS Ref S396). To the rear of the house is a small graveyard.

== See also ==
- List of civil parishes of North Tipperary
