= Michaela Morkan =

Camogie player

Personal information
- Native name: Micheáilín Ní Mhurcháin (Irish)
- Born: 1990 (age 35–36) Offaly, Ireland

Sport
- Sport: Camogie
- Position: Centrefield
- Position: Centrefield
Club
- Years: Club
- 2007 –: Shinrone
Inter-county
- Years: County
- 2007 –: Offaly
Inter-county titles
- All Stars: 1

Michaela Morkan is a camogie player with Offaly. She won a Camogie All Stars award in 2008 a Soaring Star award in 2009, and a All Ireland junior camogie medal also in 2009. She won All-Ireland 'B' titles with Offaly in Under-16 (2005) and Under-18 (2008), as well as three Senior championships with her club.
