= Henry Givens Burgess =

Irish politician and railway executive (1859–1937)

The Right Honourable Henry Givens Burgess
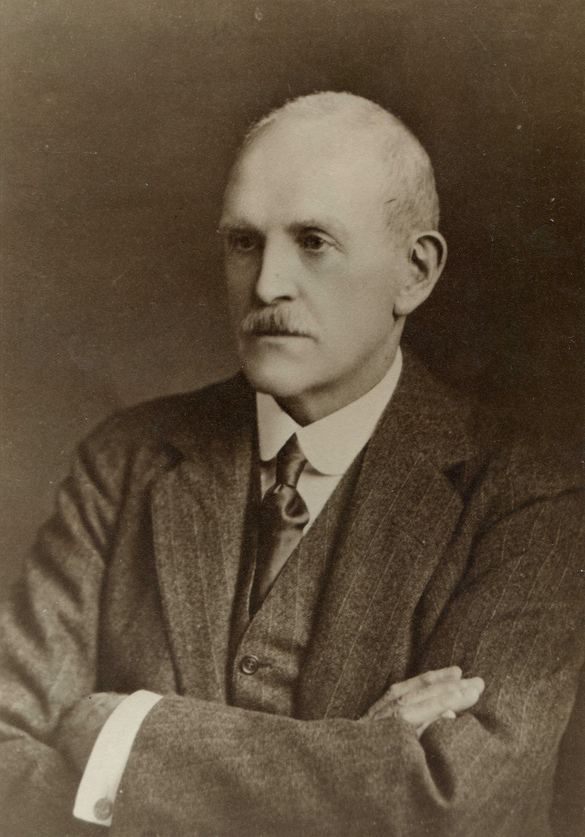

Senator
- In office 11 December 1922 – 12 December 1928

General Manager, London, Midland and Scottish Railway
- In office February 1924 – March 1927

Deputy General Manager, London, Midland and Scottish Railway
- In office December 1922 – February 1924

Deputy General Manager, London and North Western Railway
- In office 1920 – December 1922

Irish Traffic Manager, London and North Western Railway
- In office 1898–1920

Personal details
- Born: 6 April 1859 Finnoe House, County Tipperary, Ireland
- Died: 23 April 1937 (aged 78) Enniscorthy, County Wexford, Ireland
- Party: Independent

Henry Givens Burgess PC(Ire) (6 April 1859 – 23 April 1937) was an Irish railway executive and politician.

Burgess was born at Finnoe House, County Tipperary. He joined the Dublin and South Eastern Railway as a junior clerk in 1873. In 1878 he transferred to the London and North Western Railway, which also operated in Ireland, with which he stayed until 1923. From 1878 to 1883 he worked for the Irish Traffic Manager in Dublin, from 1883 to 1893 he was the company's representative in the North and Midlands of Ireland, and from 1893 to 1898 he was the company's chief representative in Scotland, based in Glasgow. In 1898 he was appointed Irish Traffic Manager himself and moved back to Dublin, occupying the post until 1920. In this post he was also manager of the Dundalk, Newry and Greenore Railway.

During the First World War he served as Director-General of Transport, Shipping Controller, and Coal Controller in Ireland in addition to his company responsibilities. In 1920 he was appointed Deputy General Manager of the LNWR and from December 1922 continued in this role for its successor, the London, Midland and Scottish Railway. In February 1924 he was appointed General Manager of the LMS. He retired in March 1927.

In addition, Burgess was a member of the Dublin Port and Docks Board, deputy chairman of the Dublin and South Eastern Railway Company, a member of the Unemployment Grants Committee in London, and a director of the Great Southern Railways. He was nominated to the Senate of the Irish Free State on its formation in 1922 and served until 1928. He was appointed to the Privy Council of Ireland in the 1922 New Year Honours for his wartime services, entitling him to the style "The Right Honourable".

He died at his country residence at Riversdale, Enniscorthy, County Wexford, while on a fishing holiday.
