= Finnoe =

Civil parish in County Tipperary, Ireland

Finnoe (Fionnú in Irish) is a civil parish in the barony of Ormond Lower, County Tipperary, Ireland. It is located close to Borrisokane.

Finnoe is in the Dáil constituency of Laois–Offaly which incorporates 24 electoral divisions that were previously in the Tipperary North Dáil constituency.

The parish is mentioned in The Pogues song "Broad Majestic Shannon" from their 1988 album "If I Should Fall From Grace With God".

== Notable residents, past and present ==
- Sir Henry Givens Burgess (1859–1937) was an Irish railway executive and politician who lived at Finnoe House.
- Edward Waller (1803–1873) was a land owner, zoologist and barrister who owned Finnoe House.
- John Francis Waller (1809–1894) was an Irish poet and editor who lived at Finnoe House.

== See also ==
- List of civil parishes of County Tipperary
