= Natural Heritage Area =

Natural Heritage Area (Irish: Limistéar Oidhreachta Nádúrtha) is a conservation designation denoting a protected area in Ireland. The Wildlife (Amendment) Act 2000 makes legal provision for the designation and protection of a national network of Natural Heritage Areas (NHAs).

The designation is currently used by the National Parks and Wildlife Service (NPWS) to protect wildlife habitats, such as raised bogs. 75 raised bogs were designated for protection in 2004 under the Wildlife Act.

== Geological sites ==
It is also intended that the designation be used to protect geosites (sites of geological and geomorphological interest). The Geological Survey of Ireland (GSI) provides scientific appraisal and interpretative advice on such sites, while the NPWS have the responsibility of designation and management.

In identifying important sites that are capable of being conserved as NHAs, the GSI groups them by geological themes. Karst (i.e. exposed limestone) was chosen as the first geological theme because of its vulnerability and the ever-mounting threats. By 2012, the GSI had completed its list of karst and early fossil sites, but the time frame for designation by NPWS was unknown. Meanwhile some geosites, such as Burren and Cliffs of Moher, had been designated Global Geoparks, part of a UNESCO assisted network.

== Threats to NHAs ==
In 2014, the Irish government proposed the de-designation of a number of Natural Heritage Areas to allow turf-cutting on bogs in these sites. This was announced as a legislative priority after the 2016 general election. Some bogs were de-designated in 2018.

== See also ==
- Scohaboy Bog
- List of nature reserves in the Republic of Ireland
