= Ollatrim River =

River in Ireland

Coordinates: 52°56′N 8°16′W

The Ollatrim River (Irish: Abhainn Chalatroma) rises in County Tipperary, Ireland. It joins the Nenagh River east of Nenagh town and together they flow into Lough Derg north of Dromineer. A short section of the river forms the border between County Offaly and County Tipperary. The river flows through the Townland of Ollatrim.

== Recreation ==
The Ollatrim river, is popular for angling, it holds a stock of wild salmon and trout. The Ormonde Anglers Association were allocated funds to improve areas of both the Ollatrim and Nenagh rivers. There are 15 km of trout fishing on the Ollatrim.

== Bridges ==
Rathurles Bridge, a three arched road bridge built in the 18th century in the townland of Rathurles is listed as being of Architectural and Technical interest.

Bridge at Cloonmore is listed as being of Architectural and Technical interest

Aghnameadle Bridge, a three arched bridge built in the late 18th century in the townland of Barngrotty in County Offaly is listed as being of Architectural and Technical interest.
