= Rathcabbin =

Village in County Tipperary, Ireland

Rathcabbin Ráth Cabáin
- Village
- Location in Ireland
- Coordinates: 53°07′02″N 8°01′36″W
- Country: Ireland
- Province: Munster
- County: County Tipperary
- Dáil constituency: Tipperary
- Time zone: UTC+0 (WET)
  - Summer (DST): UTC-1 (IST (WEST))

Rathcabbin (Irish: Ráth Cabáin, meaning 'fort of the cabin'), often Rathcabban, is a village and electoral district in the northernmost part of County Tipperary, Ireland. It is located off the R489 regional road between Portumna, County Galway and Birr, County Offaly. It is 5 km (3 mi) east of the River Shannon and Lough Derg.

The modern church of Our Lady Queen of Ireland stands at the village crossroads. The church was dedicated in 1984.

Rathcabbin was used as a filming location for the 2007 film Garage. Parts of the film were shot in the village over a six-week period in the summer of 2006, and the film's premiere was held in Rathcabbin in 2007.

At nearby Redwood, a raised bog is located where the Little Brosna River joins the Shannon. Established in 1991, it includes an area of bog dome, fen and bog pools. The area is in state ownership and forms part of the Shannon Callows, an area classified as being of Special Area of Conservation.

== Sport ==
Hurlers from the village play for the parish team Lorrha-Dorrha GAA at St. Ruadhan's Park at Moatfield, Redwood.

== Notable people ==
- Tom Duffy, hurler born in Rathcabbin
- Charles Octavius Head, army colonel and author born in Rathcabbin
- Anne Young, founder of the first Irish school of general nursing, born in Rathcabbin

== See also ==
- List of towns and villages in Ireland
