= Ballingarry, North Tipperary =

Civil parish in County Tipperary, Ireland

Ballingarry Baile an Gharraí
- Civil parish
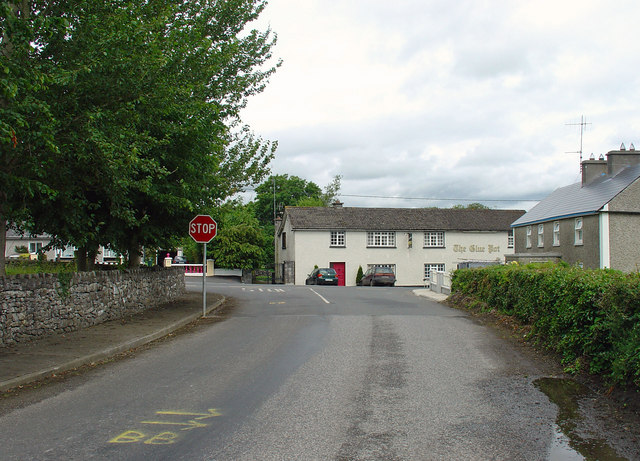
- Road junction and pub in Ballingarry

- Location in Ireland
- Coordinates: 53°01′N 8°02′W
- Country: Ireland
- Province: Munster
- County: Tipperary
- Elevation: 76 m (249 ft)

Population (2011)
  - Total: 170
- (Ballingarry townland)
- Time zone: UTC+0 (WET)
  - Summer (DST): UTC-1 (IST (WEST))
- Irish Grid Reference: R978962

Ballingarry (Irish: Baile an Gharraí) is a civil parish and a townland in the barony of Ormond Lower, County Tipperary in Ireland. It is located on the N52 between Borrisokane and Birr. Ballingarry townland has an area of 5.3 square kilometres (2 mi^{2}), and had a population of 170 people as of the 2011 census.

== Built heritage ==
The Lismacrory Mounds are a collection of prehistoric (Bronze/Iron Age) sites located 2.2 kilometres (1.4 mi) to the north of Ballingarry.

Ballingarry House is a two-storey house which appears on Tipperary County Council's Record of Protected Structures (ref S21). Within the bawn walls of medieval Ballingarry castle, a structure containing 18 bee boles was built about 1820. Constructed of limestone, they were designed to keep skeps for nearby Ballingarry House.

The local Church of Ireland church was built in 1856 near the site of an earlier church.

== Sport and recreation ==
Knockshegowna GAA is a Gaelic Athletic Association club in Ballingarry. The club are part of the North Tipperary GAA division. The club have been North Tipperary Junior Hurling Champions on nine occasions.

Ballingarry is on the route of the Beara-Breifne Way, a long-distance walking and cycling trail from the Beara Peninsula in County Cork to Blacklion in County Cavan.

== See also ==
- List of civil parishes of County Tipperary
