= Ormond Upper =

Barony in County Tipperary, Ireland

Ormond Upper (Irish: Urumhain Uachtarach) is a barony in County Tipperary, Ireland. This geographical unit of land is one of 12 baronies in County Tipperary. Its chief town is Toomevara. The barony lies between Ormond Lower to the north (whose chief town is Nenagh), Kilnamanagh Upper to the south (whose chief town is Borrisoleigh), Owney and Arra to the west (whose chief town is Newport) and Ikerrin to the east (whose chief town is Roscrea). The territory is currently administered by Tipperary County Council. The O'Mearas had an extensive territory in the barony; the name of their chief residence, Tuaim-ui-Meara, is still retained in the town of Toomavara.

== Legal context ==
Baronies were created after the Norman invasion of Ireland as divisions of counties and were used for the administration of justice and the raising of revenue. While baronies continue to be officially defined units, they have been administratively obsolete since 1898. However, they continue to be used in land registration and in specification, such as in planning permissions. In many cases, a barony corresponds to an earlier Gaelic túath which had been submitted to the Crown.

== Modern times ==
When County Tipperary was split into North and South Ridings in 1836, Ormond Upper was allocated to the north riding. However, the neighbouring barony of Kilnamanagh was split into Upper and Lower half-baronies, being allocated to the north and south ridings respectively.

== Towns, villages and townlands of the barony ==
Silvermines

=== Civil parishes of the barony ===
This table lists an historical geographical sub-division of the barony known as the civil parish (not to be confused with an Ecclesiastical parish).

Name in Irish	Name in English
An t-Aonach	Nenagh
Áth na Méadal	Aghnameadle
Baile Ghiobúin	Ballygibbon
Baile na Cloiche	Ballynaclogh
Baile Uí Mhacaí	Ballymackey
Cill Chéire	Kilkeary
An Chill Mhór	Kilmore
Cill na Naomh	Kilnaneave
Cill Ruáin	Kilruane
An Doladh	Dolla
Leatracha	Latteragh
Lios Buinne	Lisbunny
Teampall Dóinín	Templedowney
Teampall Doire	Templederry

Note: While most of the town of Nenagh is located in Ormond Lower, the civil parish of Nenagh is almost evenly split between the baronies of Upper and Lower Ormond.

== See also ==
- List of civil parishes of County Tipperary
- Butler dynasty
