= Borrisokane =

Town in County Tipperary, Ireland

Borrisokane Buiríos Uí Chéin
- Town
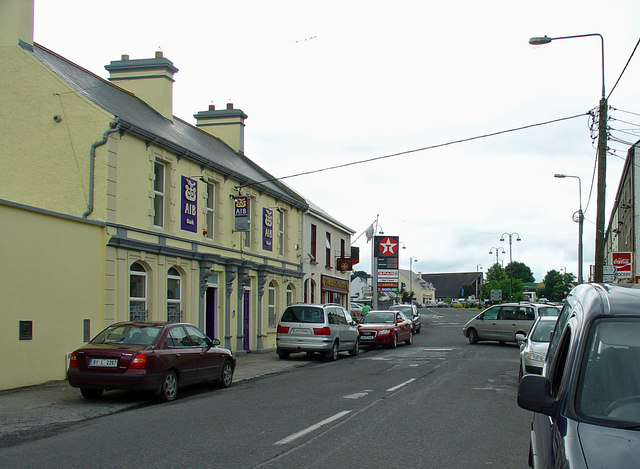
- Main Street

- Location in Ireland
- Coordinates: 52°59′46″N 8°07′40″W
- Country: Ireland
- Province: Munster
- County: County Tipperary
- Elevation: 61 m (200 ft)

Population (2022)
  - Total: 1,117
- Time zone: UTC+0 (WET)
  - Summer (DST): UTC-1 (IST (WEST))
- Irish Grid Reference: R914939
- Website: www.borrisokane.com

Borrisokane (Irish: Buiríos Uí Chéin, meaning 'the burgage of the Cianacht') is a town in County Tipperary, Ireland. It is 15 km north of Nenagh, at the junction of the N52 and N65 roads. At the 2022 census, it had a population of 1,117. The Ballyfinboy River flows through the town on its way to Lough Derg, 12 km (7 mi) to the west. It is also a civil parish in the historical barony of Ormond Lower and an Ecclesiastical parish in the Roman Catholic Diocese of Killaloe.

== History ==
During the Norman invasion of Ireland, the area now known as Borrisokane was the property of the O'Carrolls of Ely who claimed to be descendants of the Clan or Cian or the Cianacht. The O’Kennedys were another significant ruling family, owning tower houses in the surrounding townlands.

During the Cromwellian Plantation, Arthur Annesley, 1st Earl of Anglesey, the Earl of Cork and the Earl of Arran were among those granted lands at Borrisokane. Arran hill, a townland of Borrisokane, is thought likely to be named after the latter.

Local population changes throughout the nineteenth and twentieth centuries have underlined the great social and economic challenges that Ireland as a nation itself faced during these times. The population of the parish in 1831 was 2,634 and in 1841, it had risen to 3,175. Due to reasons of famine and emigration, this number has fallen steadily to 1,145 today.

During the War of Independence, and the Civil War which followed, Borrisokane was witness to local hostilities. On 26 June 1920 about 200 IRA volunteers attacked an RIC barracks at Borrisokane, currently the town's Garda Station. The attack was unsuccessful, but the building was so badly damaged that it was evacuated the next day. One Volunteer was killed in the action, and a plaque commemorates him today as Micheál Ó Cinnéide, Uncle of the former Government Minister Michael O'Kennedy.

The Modreeny Ambush took place on the 3 June 1921, during the Irish War of Independence. The ambush was an attack on an RIC and Black and Tan patrol en route to the local Petty Sessions in Borrisokane Courthouse. It was committed by a Flying Column led by Sean Gaynor at Kylebeg Cross, between Borrisokane and Cloughjordan and resulted in the deaths of four RIC/ Black and Tan members. Later that same day, a branch of the Munster and Leinster Bank was robbed of £2,000. Borrisokane Courthouse and its jail were also burned.

== Local industry ==
Situated as it is in the Great Plain of Lower Ormond, much of the land around Borrisokane is well suited to farm production. As such, the area has a strong agricultural history which continues to this day.

During the nineteenth century and the first half of the twentieth century, Borrisokane was an important centre for wheat production. There was an active mill in the town, which was operational from 1810 until about 1940, the mill was demolished in April 2010, an event which caused some local anger. Beside the site of the mill there is a lane known as 'Brewers Lane' suggesting there was previously a brewery here.

== Culture ==
In his poem, The Faerie Queene, Edmund Spenser is said to have referred to the local hill of Knockshegowna. Knockshegowna (Irish: Cnoc Sí Úna) translated literally means 'The Hill of Fairy Una'. In Spenser's poem, Úna, the personification of the "True Church" travels with the Redcrosse Knight (who represents England), whom she has recruited to save her parents' castle from a dragon.

Knockshegowna Hill and its supposed fairies is also the subject of Richard D'Alton Williams' poem The Fairies of Knockshegowna and The Legend of Knockshegowna by Thomas Crofton Croker.

In 1930, the David Clarke Memorial Hall was opened in Borrisokane, dedicated to the memory of the town's then most prominent Landlord, David Clarke. The Hall is still used today for the staging of musical and theatrical productions and is also the location of the towns cineclub.

The book Stella Days: The Life and Times of a Rural Irish Cinema was written by Michael Doorley. It is based on the true story of how Borrisokane's small cinema came to being in the 1950s. In 2011 Stella Days, the movie based on the book, was released. Filming, however, took place in the town of Fethard rather than Borrisokane. The movie was shown to an invited audience in the Clarke Memorial Hall on 24 March 2012. The film stars American actor Martin Sheen, whose mother comes from Borrisokane.

== Town Park ==
A public park on both sides of the Ballyfinboy river. The park was created and financed by the townspeople rather than the council.

== Borrisokane forest ==
Borrisokane forest extends northwards from the R445 road to Portumna and from Lough Derg to the County Offaly border. The forest consists of several small, widely dispersed areas of woodland. Coillte manages the forest which includes amongst others Sopwell woods and Knockanacree woods near Cloghjordan.

== Sport ==
Borrisokane FC is based at the Community Sports Grounds. Playing in red and black shirts, sponsored by The Green Bar public house, the club fields multiple teams at both youth and senior levels.

In March 2016 the 1st XI, under the management of Matty Power, secured the Division 1 League championship losing just one game all season and finishing in style with an 8-1 demolition of Ballymacky.

The Borrisokane GAA club is based at Páirc Gairnéir and their colours are green and white. In 2010 they won the Tipperary Intermediate Hurling Championship and were unlucky to lose out in the Munster Intermediate Hurling Championship. In 2009, Borrisokane won the inaugural North Tipperary Junior C Hurling Championship.

The Borrisokane Athletic Club caters for athletes from age 8 to senior. Athletes from this small town club have travelled the world representing their country and can boast over 100 National titles throughout its 30 years. Most recently the club's success has come from the senior ladies who were crowned National League Champions in 2008.

Cycling, the town is on one of the North Tipperary Cycle Routes. This 65 km route starts at Banba Square, Nenagh and is listed as a half-day cycle.

Horse Racing: races associated with the Ormond Hunt pack were first held at Borrisokane on the farm of John Reddan at Kylenagoona, near Borrisokane in the year 1863. Meetings were held annually in June, July and August, with particularly keen competition for the Borrisokane Plate. Racing continued up until the early 1900s when it moved closer to the town. A song, 'The Kylenagoona Races' was composed in reference to Borrisokane's local horse racing.

The town and district are today home to a number of well-known equestrian personalities including former Irish champion jockey turned racehorse trainer Charlie Swan, who lives in nearby Cloughjordan.

== Buildings of note ==
Whilst there are other buildings of architectural interest in and around Borrisokane, the following are featured in 'An Introduction To The Architectural Heritage Of North Tipperary' and on the National Inventory of Architectural Heritage website

- Semi-detached houses with integral arch, Main Street (c. 1800): Pair of semi-detached three-storey houses with integral carriage arch.
- Water Mill, Mill Street (c. 1810): Two four-storey blocks. (Demolished 30 April 2010)
- Church of Ireland church, Main St. (1812) Single-cell Board of First Fruits church.
- Former miller's house, Mill Street (c. 1815): Three bay two-storey house attached to the mill.
- Kylepark Agricultural School, Kyletombrickane (c. 1843): An agricultural school founded on his estate at Kyle Park, Borrisokane by Thomas George Stoney
- The Terrace, Nenagh Rd. (c. 1815) Two pairs of semi-detached houses and a detached house, two storeys over basement with outbuildings and yards. Listed as protected structures by Tipperary County Council (RPS Refs S425 to S429).
- Old Church Centre, Mill Street (1839): Cruciform plan gable-fronted former church.
- Borrisokane Courthouse and College (c. 1850): Former Workhouse and courtyards.
- Methodist Chapel, Main Street (1868): Gable fronted single cell church.
- David Clarke Hall, Mill Street (c. 1930): Gable-fronted memorial hall. Briefly converted to the Stella cinema during the 1950s and 1960s.

== People ==
- Sir Henry Givens Burgess (1859–1937), Irish railway executive and politician (lived at Finnoe House)
- Frank Corcoran (born 1944), Irish composer (born and lived at Killavalla House)
- James Doorley, assistant director, policy and advocacy at the National Youth Council of Ireland
- Eugene Esmonde (1909–1942), recipient of the Victoria Cross for his efforts during World War II (lived at Drominagh)
- Séamus Gardiner (1894–1976), former President of the GAA
- Capt. Sir Alan Hillgarth (1899–1978), British-born novelist and intelligence agent (lived at Gortnalougha)
- David Hogan (born 1988) a professional snooker player.
- Rex Ingram (1892–1950), film director, lived at The Old Rectory
- John McKenna (1938-2025), hurling player from Borrisokane
- Áine Minogue (born 1977), harpist, born in Borrisokane, now living in the US
- Michaela Morkan (born 1990), camogie player and student attended Borrisokane Community College where she was female sportsperson of the year in 2008.
- Dylan Slevin (born 2002), darts player
- Andrew Robinson Stoney (1747–1810), politician, philanderer and true life basis for Barry Lyndon
- Charlie Swan (born 1968), Racehorse trainer and former Champion Jockey (born and still lives at Modreeney)
- Frederick Trench, 1st Baron Ashtown (1755–1840), Anglo-Irish politician, lived at Sopwell Hall
- John Francis Waller (1810–1894), poet and editor

== See also ==
- List of civil parishes of Tipperary
- List of towns and villages in Ireland
