= Ormond Lower =

Barony in County Tipperary, Ireland

Ormond Lower (Irish: Urumhain Íochtarach) is a barony in County Tipperary, Ireland. This geographical unit of land is one of 12 baronies in County Tipperary. Its chief town is Nenagh. The barony lies between Ormond Upper to the south-east (whose chief town is Toomevara) and Owney and Arra to the south-west (whose chief town is Newport). As a "peninsula", it is surrounded on three sides by counties Galway and Offaly.

== Legal context ==
Baronies were created after the Norman invasion of Ireland as divisions of counties and were used the administration of justice and the raising of revenue. While baronies continue to be officially defined units, they have been administratively obsolete since 1898. However, they continue to be used in land registration and in specification, such as in planning permissions. In many cases, a barony corresponds to an earlier Gaelic túath which had submitted to the Crown. The Earl of Ormond wrongly applied the name "Ormond" to two baronies as they were never part of the eastern Kingdom of Ormond; rather they were part of the tuath of Muskerry Tire which was subject to the north-western Kingdom of Thomond.

== Modern times ==
When County Tipperary was split into North and South Ridings in 1836, Ormond Lower was allocated to the north riding. However, the neighbouring barony of Kilnamanagh was split into Upper and Lower half-baronies, being allocated to the north and south ridings respectively.

== Towns, villages and townlands of the barony ==
=== Civil parishes ===
This table lists an historical geographical sub-division of the barony known as the civil parish (not to be confused with an Ecclesiastical parish).

Name in Irish	Name in English
An tAonach	Nenagh
Ard Cróine	Ardcrony
Baile an Gharraí	Ballingarry
Baile Locha Caoin	Loughkeen
Buiríos Uí Chéin	Borrisokane
Cill Bharráin	Kilbarron
Cill Ó dTiarnáin	Killodiernan
Cill Ruáin	Kilruane
Cloch an Phrióra	Cloughprior
An Cnaoi	Knigh
Drom Inbhir	Dromineer
Dura	Dorrha
Eaglais Chlocháin	Aglishcloghane
Fionnú	Finnoe
Lothra	Lorrha
Maigh Drithne	Modreeny
Maigh Saotha	Monsea
Tír Dhá Ghlas	Terryglass
Uisceán	Uskane

=== Other villages and townlands ===
Abbeville, Ballysteena, Ballyquirk, Borrisokane, Cloughjordan (town), Cloghjordanpark (townland), Cowbawn, Crotta, Derry, Drumnamahane Island, Eminiska, Feigh West, Firgrove, Graigue, Islandwood, Johnstown, Killeen, Kilruane, Lehinch, Lorrha, Loughkeen, Modreeny, Mulinkeagh, Newtown, Newtown (Guest), Newtown (Hodgins), O’Meara’s Acres, Oxpark, Portland, Quakerstown, Richmond, Stoneyacre, Townfields, Uskane, Willsborough.

== See also ==
- List of civil parishes of County Tipperary
