= Modreeny =

Civil parish in County Tipperary, Ireland

Coordinates: 52°57′N 8°03′W

Modreeny (Irish: Maigh Drithne) is a townland and a civil parish in the historical barony of Ormond Lower, County Tipperary in Ireland situated on the R490 road between the towns of Borrisokane and Cloughjordan. Ormond Foxhounds are based at kennels at Modreeny.

== Built heritage ==
Notable buildings in the area include "Modreeny", a seven bay country house and gate lodge listed as being of architectural and artistic interest.

Modreeny Church is a ruined 19th-century Church of Ireland church commissioned by the Board of First Fruits. It has an adjoining cemetery and, to the west, the remains of a medieval church. The nearby glebe house was designed by Roscrea architect James Sheane and constructed around 1813.

== Modreeny ambush ==
An ambush took place near here on 3 June 1921, during the Irish War of Independence. The ambush was an attack on an RIC and Black and Tan patrol en route to the local Petty Sessions in Cloughjordan Courthouse. It was undertaken by a flying column led by Sean Gaynor at Kylebeg Cross, between Borrisokane and Cloughjordan and resulted in the deaths of four RIC/ Black and Tan members. Seán McCurtin was an IRA participant. A RIC patrol of twelve men led by Sergeant Jones were cycling from RIC barracks in Borrisokane to Petty Sessions in Cloughjordan courthouse. The Borrisokane courthouse had been badly damaged by IRA attack and the court sitting was transferred to Cloughjordan. Just before the ambush the cycle patrol was overtaken by a motorised patrol of sixteen men in cars from Roscrea RIC barracks under the command of DI Edmund Fitzpatrick. The RIC men who were killed : Con. James Briggs DCM MM (Borrisokane RIC from Garlieston, Scotland - a "Black & Tan") : Con. John Cantlon (Roscrea RIC from Ballyellin, Co Carlow) : Con. Martin Feeney (Borrisokane RIC from Culleenanory, Co. Roscommon) : Con. William Walsh (Roscrea RIC from Co. Kilkenny)

== See also ==
- List of civil parishes of County Tipperary
