= Ballyloughnane =

Townland in County Tipperary, Ireland

Ballyloughnane Baile Uí Lachnáin
- Townland
- Location in Ireland
- Coordinates: 53°07′46″N 8°08′21″W
- Country: Ireland
- County: County Tipperary
- Parish: Loughkeen

Ballyloughnane (Baile Uí Lachnáin in Irish) is a townland in the historical Barony of Ormond Lower, County Tipperary, Ireland. It is centred on Riverstown in the civil parish of Loughkeen where the N52 road crosses the Little Brosna River.

== Protected structures ==
Two structures within the townland are listed as being protected by Tipperary County Council. Rivertown House, a detached two storey house dating from c. 1775 (ref S335) and Riverstown Bridge which carries the N52 over the Little Brosna (ref S336).
