= Ballymore Castle =

Fortress in Ireland

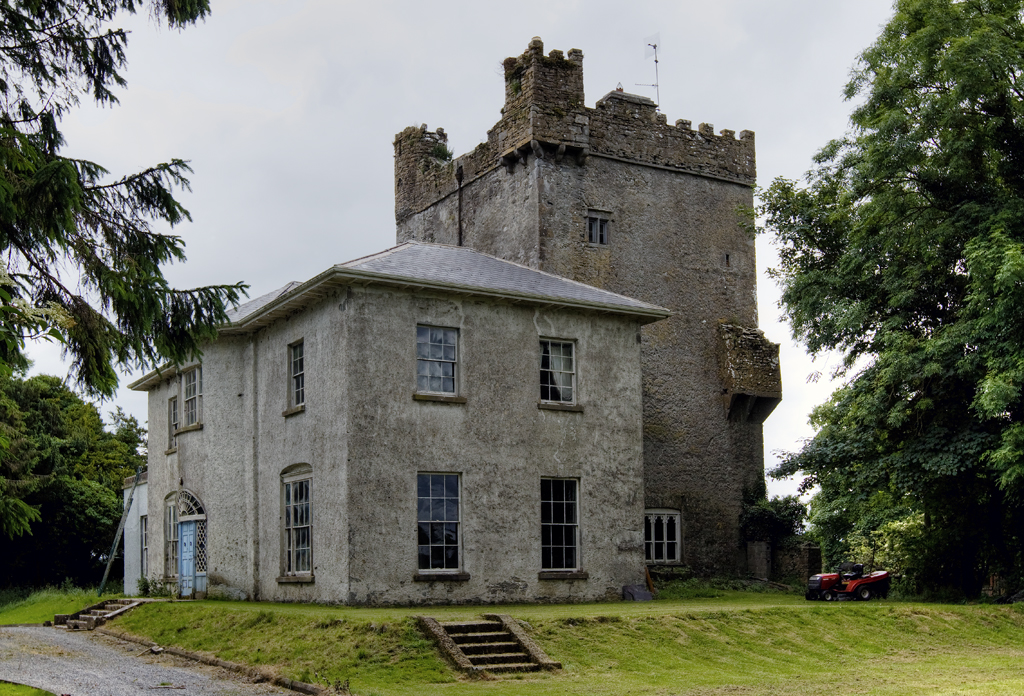
- Castles of Connacht- Ballymore, Galway
- Interactive map of the Ballymore Castle area

General information
- Location: Lawrencetown, Ireland
- Coordinates: 53°14′0″N 8°11′0″W
- Construction started: 1585

Ballymore Castle in Lawrencetown, County Galway, Ireland was originally a 15th-century tower house belonging to O'Madden. A house was added in 1620, and the castle has been much altered since then.

== Early history ==
The castle was built in 1585 by John Lawrence on land he had acquired through his marriage to a daughter of O'Madden, Lord of Longford. In 1603 John Lawrence's eldest son, Walter Lawrence, married Cecily Moore, the granddaughter of Richard Burke, 2nd Earl of Clanricarde. The Castle of Ballymore suffered much during the subsequent wars and was repaired by Walter Lawrence, who erected a commemorative marble chimney-piece in one of the upper rooms of the Castle, bearing his initials W.L. 1620.

John Lawrence Jr. was dispossessed by Oliver Cromwell in 1641, having espoused the royalist cause in the Wars of the Three Kingdoms, under the leadership of Ulick Burke, 1st Marquess of Clanricarde. The castle and much of the estate was given to Sir Thomas Newcomen, who leased the castle to the Lawrences for many years.

== Williamite war ==
During the Williamite wars, Patrick Sarsfield, 1st Earl of Lucan sent Ulick Burke, 1st Viscount Galway to hold Ballymore. In early June 1691, Burke and about 1200 defenders encamped in a fort on the shores of Lough Seudy. A smaller force occupied the castle, which de Ginkell attacked first. The sergeant and his small band resisted, and when eventually they were captured, de Ginkell hanged the sergeant before turning his attention to the fort.

The fort was besieged by artillery on the land side, approached on the water by boats, the governor, Colonel Ulick deemed it right to surrender on the following day". De Ginkell remained at Ballymore for a further ten days, to prepare his troops for their next engagement at Athlone.

== Later history ==
On Newcomen's death, it passed to his stepson, Nicholas Cusack of Cushinstown, County Meath, who sold it to John Eyre of Eyrecourt about 1720. At the time the estate was leased by the Seymour family. The castle was modernised and a two-story house added to the castle in 1815, featuring a central bow with a curved fanlighted doorway. Thomas Seymour purchased the castle and lands outright from Giles Eyre around 1824. He was married to Matilda Margaret Lawrence. Their son, Queensland Police Commissioner David Thompson Seymour, was born at Ballymore Castle in November 1831.

Mrs. Hale, a relative of the Seymours, inherited the estate which was somewhat reduced at this time, a large portion having been acquired by the Irish Land Commission.

"Ballymore Castle" is also the name of a brown gelding racehorse.
