= Walshpark =

Townland in County Tipperary, Ireland

Walshpark (Doire Leathan in Irish) is a townland in the historical Barony of Ormond Lower, County Tipperary, Ireland. It is located south of the staggered junction where the R438 and R489 roads meet. It is within the civil parish of Dorrha in the north of the county. The name comes from the Walsh family who made their home here in the 18th and 19th centuries.

== Buildings of note ==
Derrylahan Park

Derrylahan Park, built for Willian Henry Head in 1862 to designs by Thomas Newenham Deane stood in Walshpark until 1921. The house was occupied by Head's son, Charles Octavius Head, when it was burnt down on 1 July 1921 during the War of Independence. All that remains is the main gateway, a gate house and farm buildings, all visible from the R438 road south west of its junction with the R489.
