= Charles Head =

Charles Head may refer to:

- Charles P. Head, state legislator in Mississippi
- Charles Octavius Head (1869–1952), Irish colonel in the British Army
