= R489 road (Ireland) =

Road in Ireland

R489 road
- Bóthar R489

Route information
- Length: 20 km (12 mi)

Location
- Country: Ireland
- Primary destinations: County Tipperary; Starts in Riverstown at junction with N52; Clonoma; R438 (cross at staggered junction); Portland; Terminates at the N65 2 kilometers east of Portumna

Highway system
- Roads in Ireland; Motorways; Primary; Secondary; Regional

The R489 road is a regional road in Ireland linking the N52 at Riverstown, County Tipperary with the N65 east of Portumna bridge.

The road is 20 km (12 mi) long.

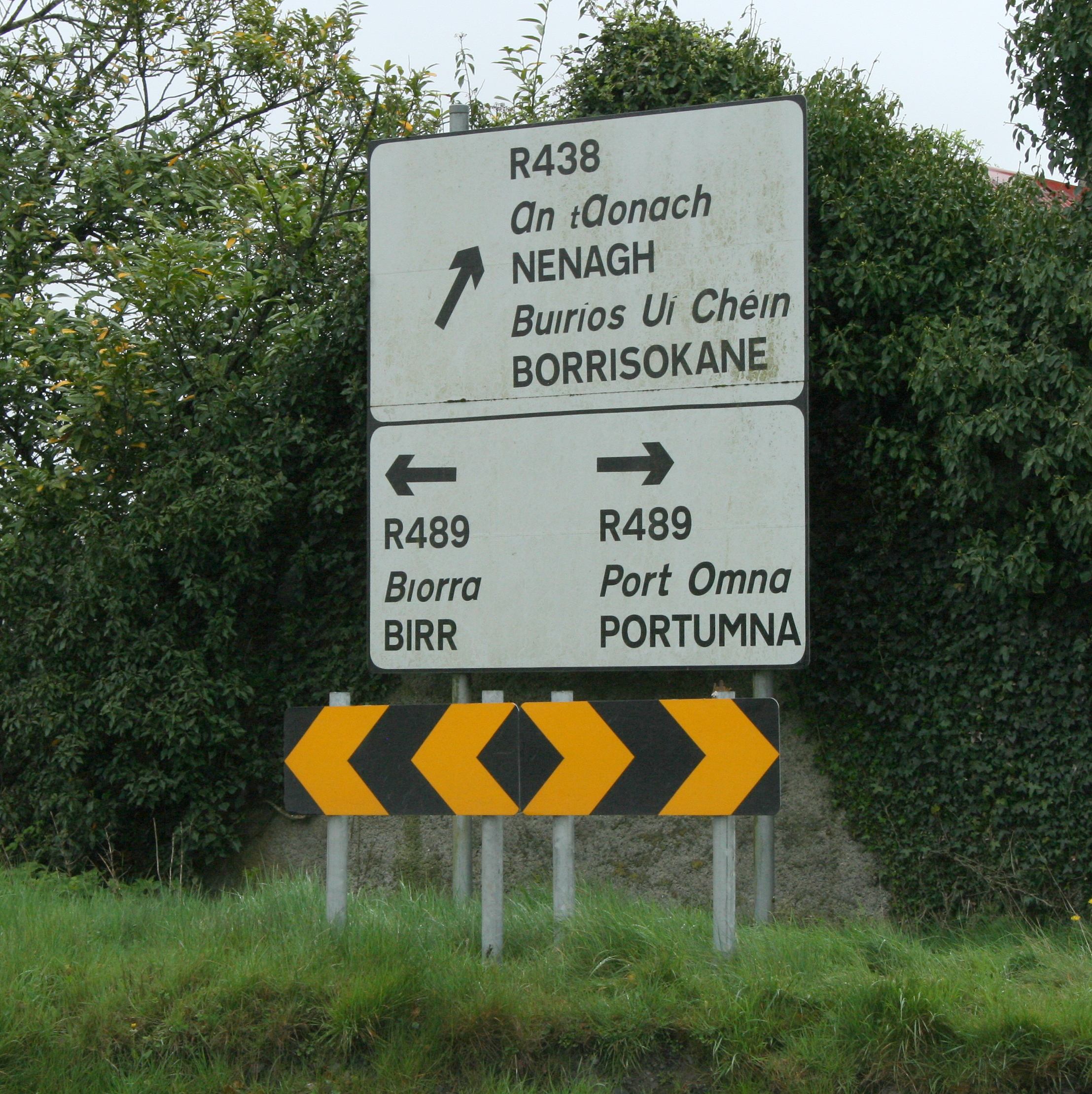
R489 where it is crossed by the R438 at a staggered junction

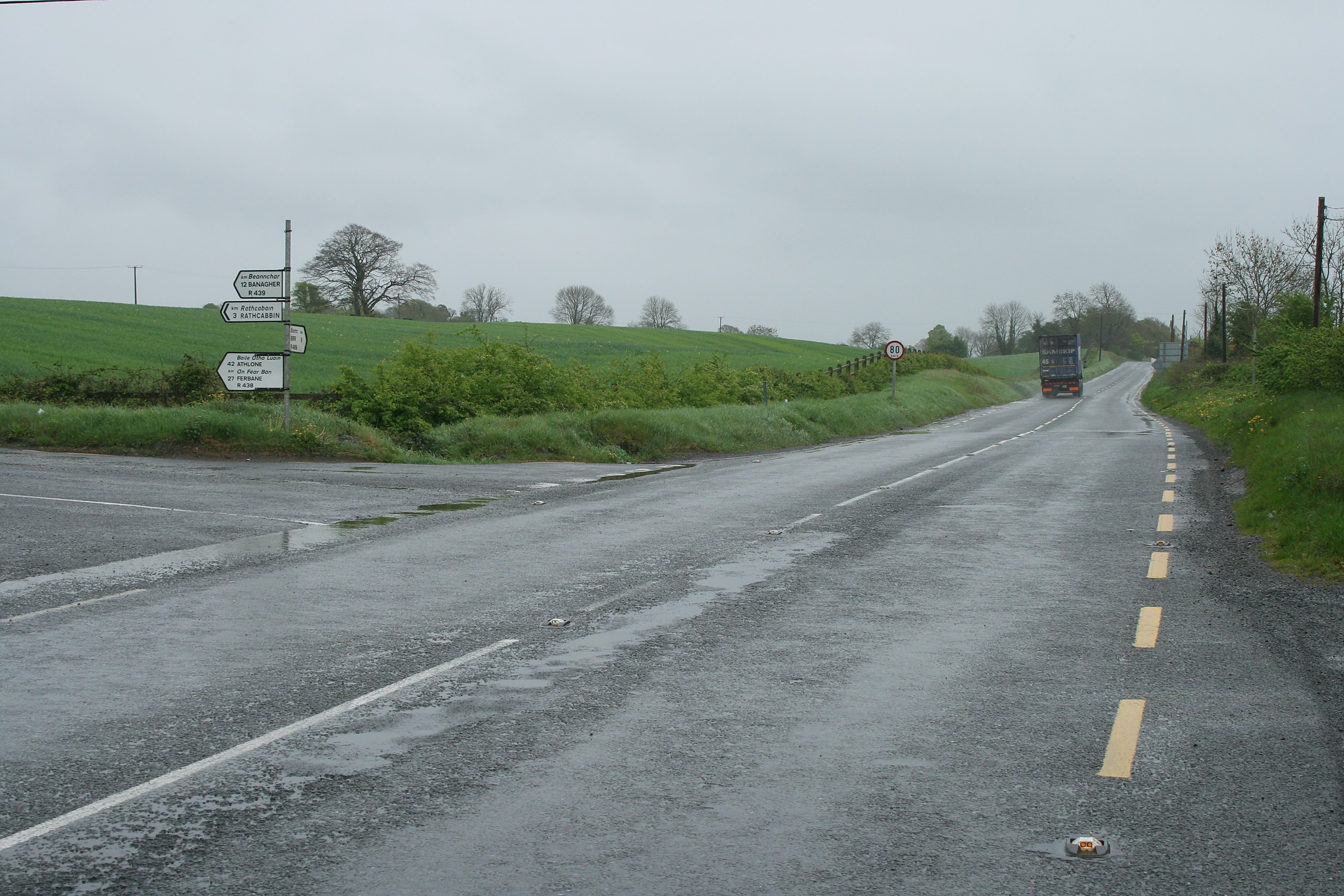
R489 where it is joined by the R438 at a staggered junction

== See also ==
- Roads in Ireland
- National primary road
- National secondary road
