= R355 road =

R355 road may refer to:

- R355 road (Ireland)
- R355 road (South Africa)
