= Longford (County Galway barony) =

Barony in County Galway, Ireland

Longford An Longfort (Irish)
- Barony
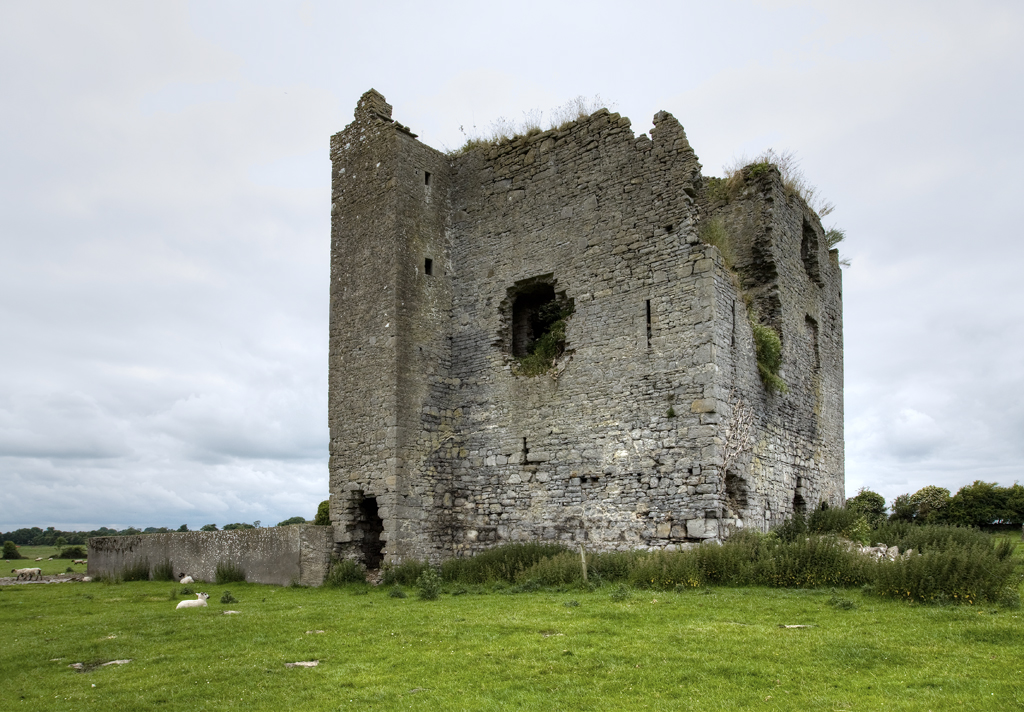
- Longford Castle, the O'Madden stronghold

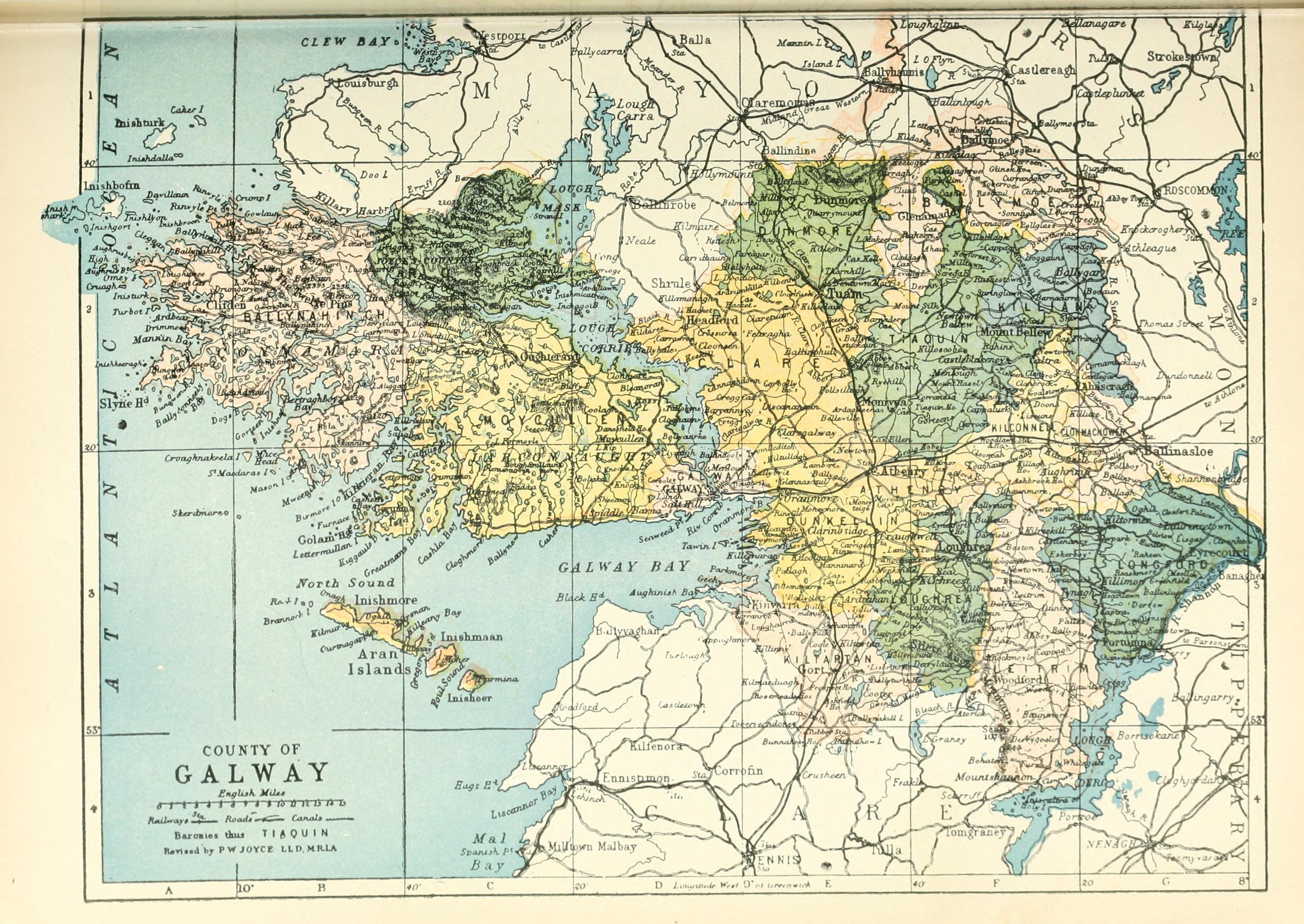
- Barony map of County Galway, 1900; Longford is in the southeast, coloured green.

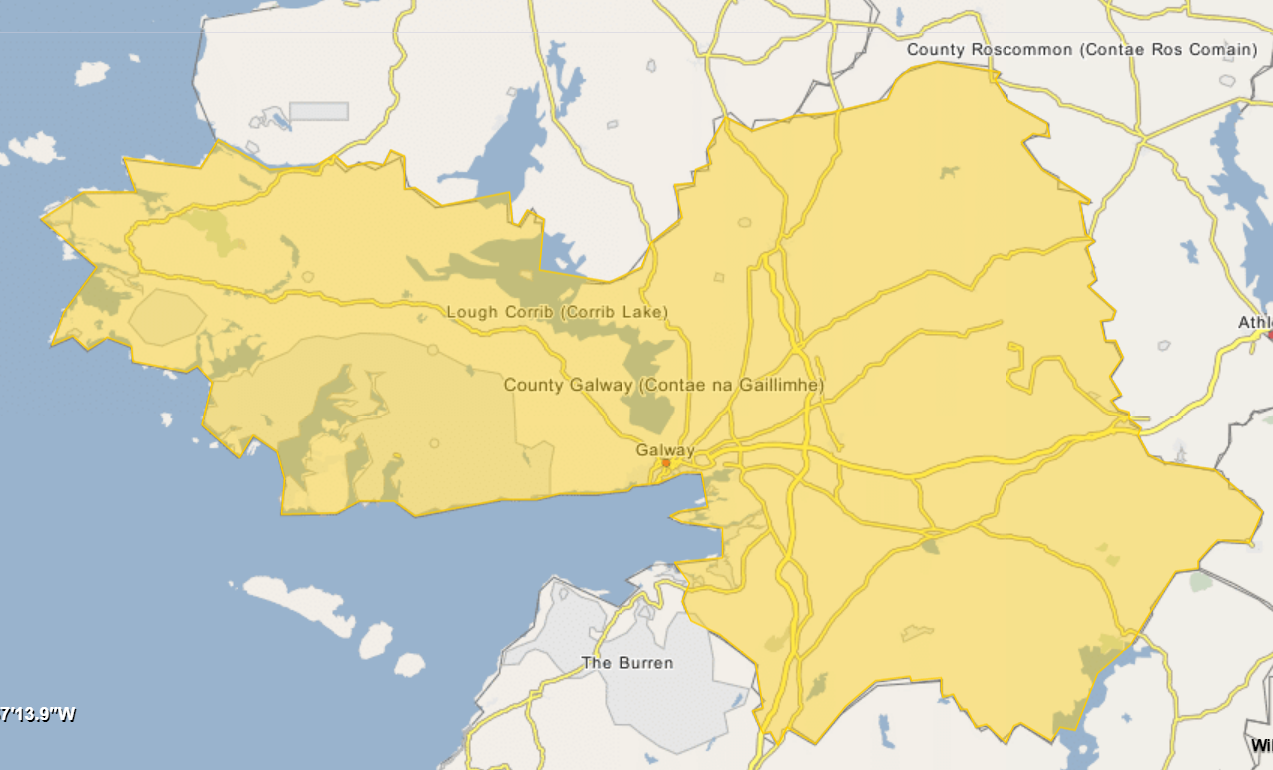
- Location within County Galway
- Coordinates: 53°12′N 8°14′W
- Sovereign state: Ireland
- Province: Connacht
- County: Galway

Area
  - Total: 390.5 km^{2} (150.8 sq mi)

Longford (Irish: An Longfort) is a historical barony in southeastern County Galway, Ireland.

Baronies were mainly cadastral rather than administrative units. They acquired modest local taxation and spending functions in the 19th century before being superseded by the Local Government (Ireland) Act 1898.

== History ==
The name is from a medieval longphort (ship landing-ground used by Vikings) that was located on the River Shannon east of Killimor, called Longphort Uí Mhadadhain ("landing-place of the O'Maddens"); their castle was located 2.8 km (1.7 mi) northwest of the river.

This region was anciently called Síol Anmchadha, and its medieval Gaelic lords were the Ó Madagáin or O Madadhain (O'Madagan or O'Madden), based in Portumna, who also ruled Garrycastle, County Offaly.

Longford barony was created before 1574.

== Geography ==
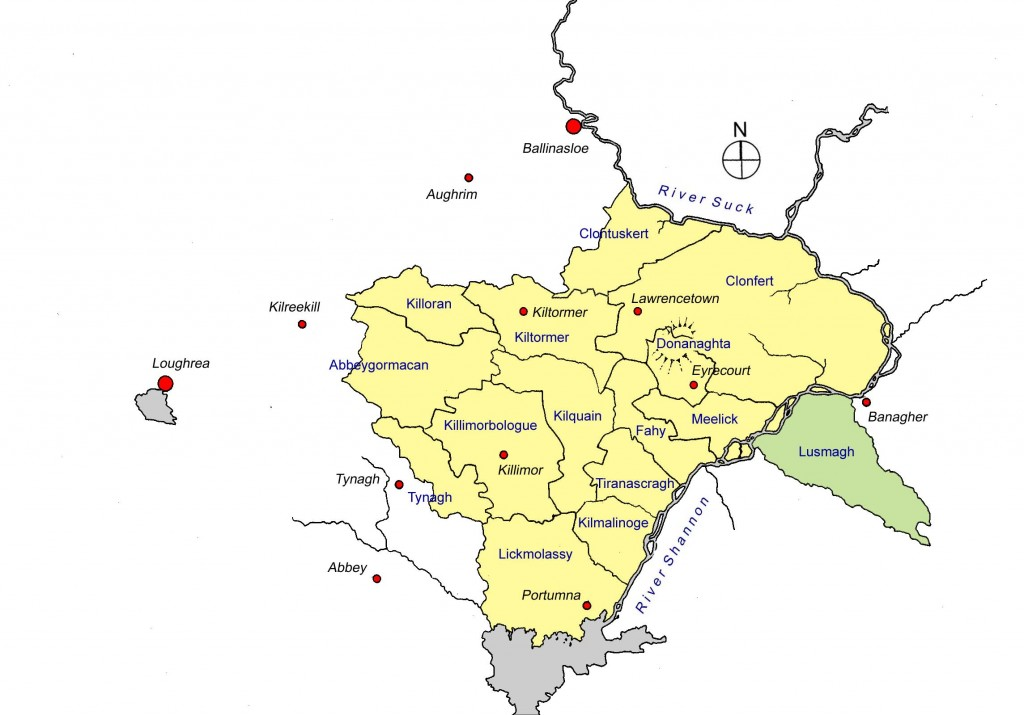
Map of the Longford barony. Lusmagh civil parish (green) was in the mid-17th century transferred to King's County (Offaly).

Longford is in the southeast of the county, on the west bank of the River Suck, where it forms part of the border with County Roscommon, and the west bank of the River Shannon and north bank of Lough Derg where they form the border with County Tipperary.

== List of settlements ==
Settlements within the historical barony of Longford include:

- Clonfert
- Clontuskert
- Eyrecourt
- Kiltormer
- Lawrencetown
- Portumna
