= R439 road (Ireland) =

Road in County Offaly, Ireland

R439 road
- Bóthar R439
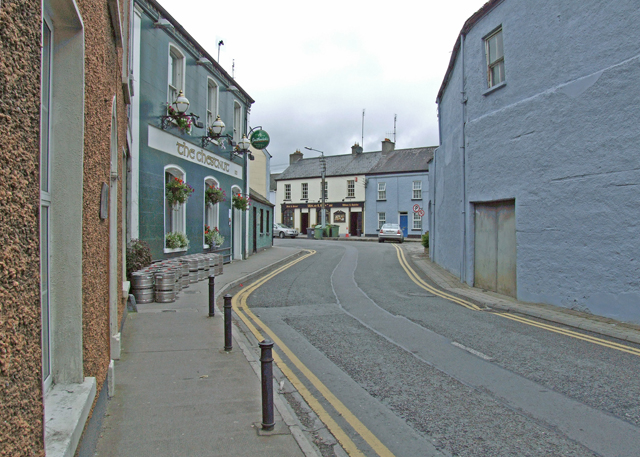
- Green Street, Birr, on the R439

Route information
- Length: 13 km (8.1 mi)

Location
- Country: Ireland
- Primary destinations: County Offaly; Birr; Starts at junction with N52; (R438), Taylor's Cross; Banagher, Terminates at the R356 junction

Highway system
- Roads in Ireland; Motorways; Primary; Secondary; Regional

The R439 road is a regional road in Ireland linking Birr with Banagher in County Offaly. The route is about 13 km (8 mi) in length.

The road begins with a junction on the N52 road at Emmet Square at the centre of Birr Town and continues northwards taking the following routes through the town; Green Street, Rosse Row, Model School Road, Eden Road & Cappaneale. The road continues northwards forming a crossroads junction with the R438 at Taylor's Cross. The road continues into Banagher as Birr Road & Main Street. The route terminates in Main Street at the junction with the R356.

== See also ==
- National primary road
- National secondary road
- Roads in Ireland
