= R438 road (Ireland) =

Road in Ireland

R438 road
- Bóthar R438
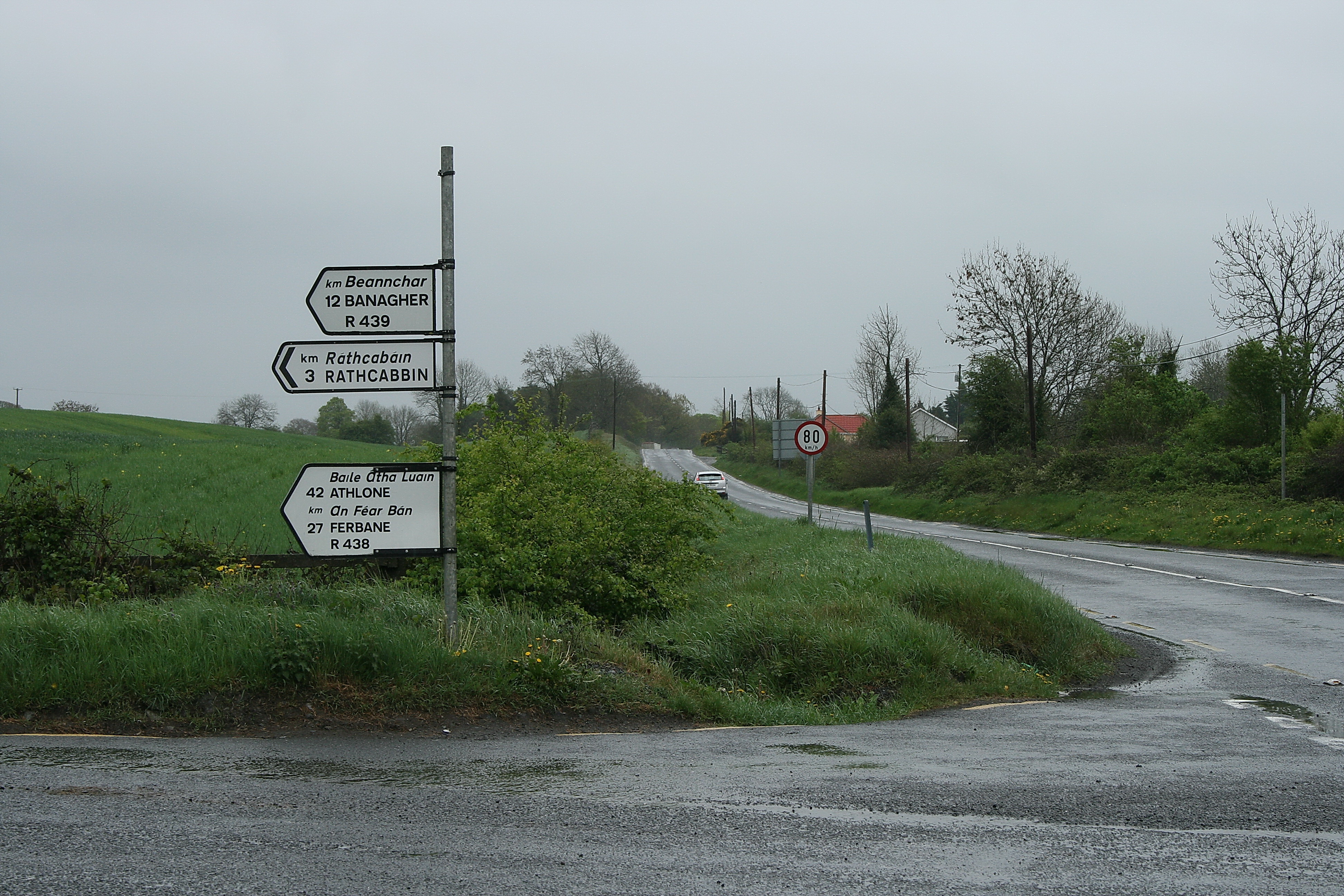
- R438 at R489 junction; sign suggests it is both R438 and R439

Route information
- Length: 30 km (19 mi)

Location
- Country: Ireland
- Primary destinations: County Offaly; Start at junction with R356; R339 (cross at Taylor's Cross); Little Brosna River; County Tipperary; Cross R489 at staggered junction.; Terminates at the N65 two kilometers north of Borrisokane

Highway system
- Roads in Ireland; Motorways; Primary; Secondary; Regional

The R438 road is a regional road in Ireland linking the N62 road south of Cloghan, County Offaly with the N65 road two kilometers north of Borrisokane in County Tipperary. The road is 30 km (19 mi) long.

== See also ==
- Roads in Ireland
- National primary road
- National secondary road
