= M6 motorway (Ireland) =

Road in Ireland

M6 motorway
- Mótarbhealach M6
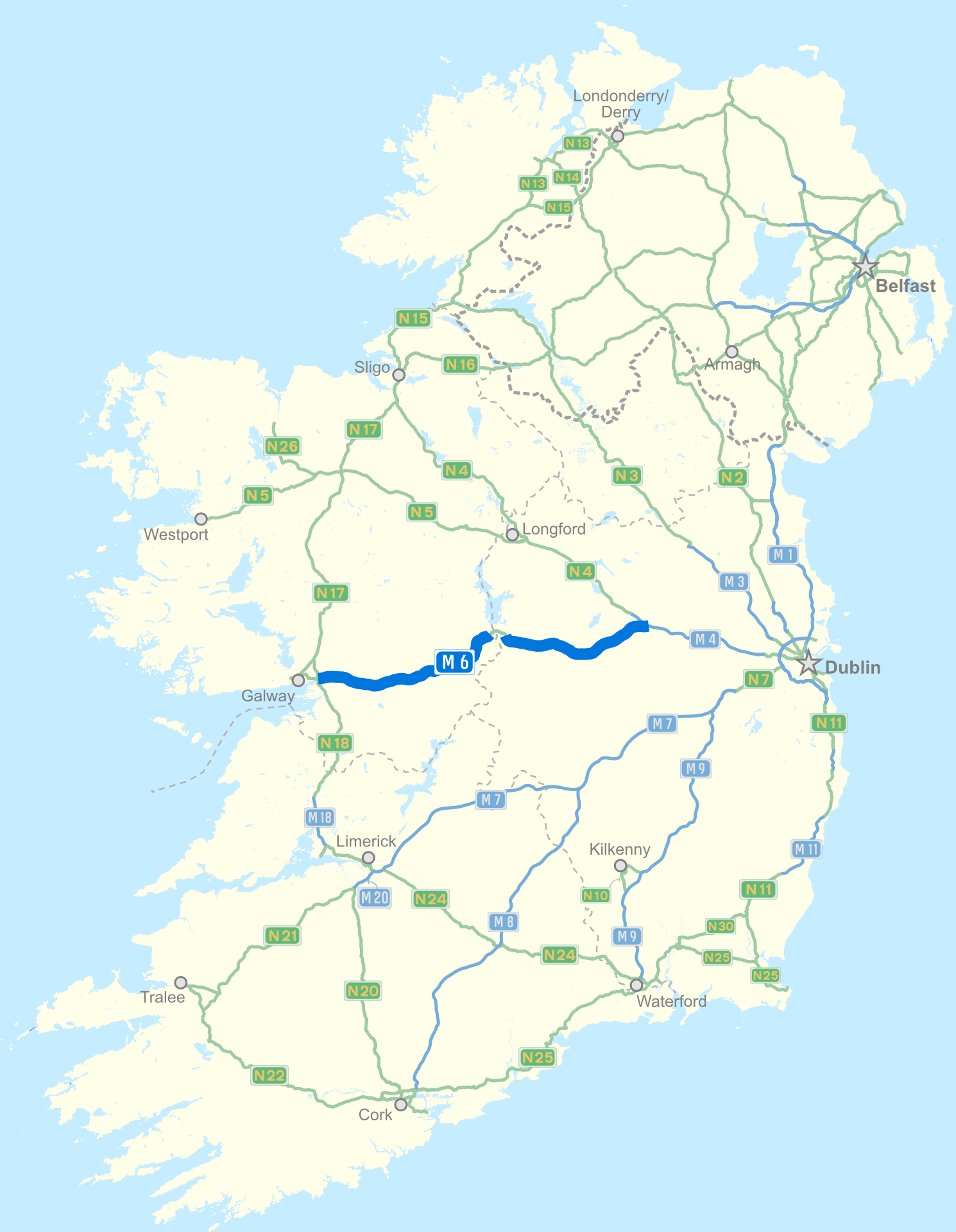
- Clickable image

Route information
- Length: 148 km (92 mi)
- Existed: 2006–present
- History: Completed in 2009

Major junctions
- From: Kinnegad
- J1 → M4 motorway J4 → N52 road J5 → N52 road J8 → N62 road J10 → N55 road J12 → N61 road J16 → N65 road J18 → M17 motorway, M18 motorway
- To: Galway

Location
- Country: Ireland
- Primary destinations: Kinnegad, Rochfortbridge, Tyrrellspass, Kilbeggan, Moate, Athlone, Ballinasloe, Loughrea, Athenry, Oranmore

Highway system
- Roads in Ireland; Motorways; Primary; Secondary; Regional

The M6 motorway (Irish: Mótarbhealach M6) is a motorway in Ireland, which runs (together with the M4) from Dublin to Galway. The M6 extends from its junction with the M4 at Kinnegad all the way west to the outskirts of Galway City, but the Athlone bypass and the approach to Galway city - while of dual carriageway standard - have not been designated motorway and are still signed as N6. The motorway was officially completed and opened to traffic on 18 December 2009, and was the first city-to-city direct major inter-urban route to be completed in Ireland. The M6 and M4, which form the Galway–Dublin route, consist of a grade-separated 2+2 dual carriageway road with a top speed limit of 120 km/h. At approximately 144 km (90 mi), the M6 is the third longest motorway in the state and will be 159 km.

== Route ==
Near Kinnegad, the M6 motorway diverges from the M4 at a restricted access fork style junction. From here it proceeds westward, passing through counties Westmeath, Offaly, Roscommon and Galway before terminating just east of Galway City near Doughiska.

== History ==
The present-day M6 was constructed in five stages between 2005 and late 2009. Some of the sections which now form part of the M6 were initially opened as dual-carriageway and previously formed part of the N6, while other sections were opened as motorway. In chronological order, the various sections opened as follows (status on opening in brackets):

- Kinnegad-Tyrrellspass (5 December 2006, as dual carriageway);
- Tyrrellspass-Kilbeggan (16 May 2007, as dual carriageway);
- Kilbeggan-Athlone (16 July 2008, as dual carriageway);
- Athlone-Ballinasloe (23 July 2009, as motorway);
- Ballinasloe-Galway (18 December 2009, as motorway).

=== Kinnegad-Athlone ===
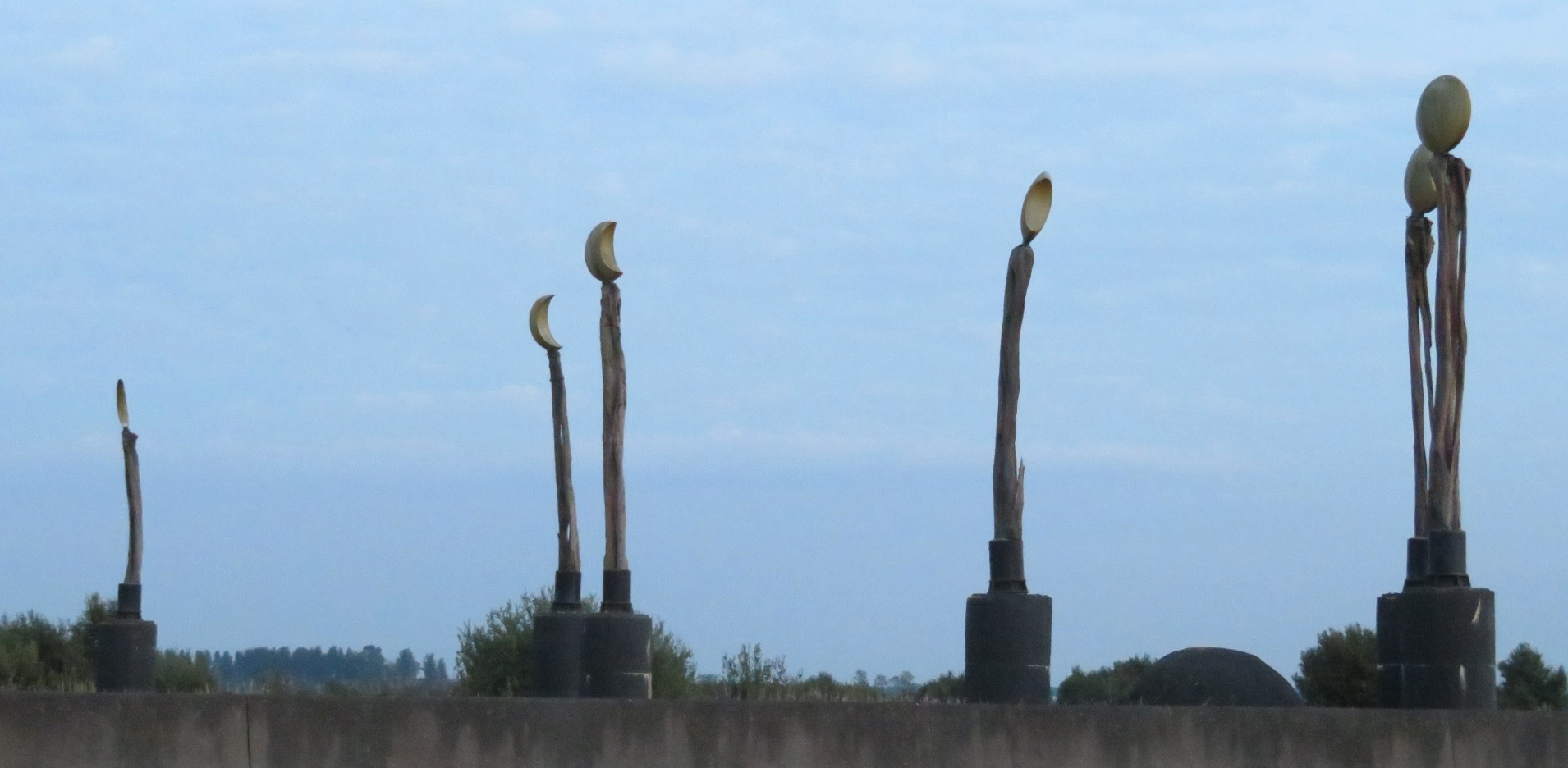
Passage, a sculpture by Brian O'Loughlin (2006), beside the westbound lanes of the M6 motorway, at Pass of Kilbride

From 24 September 2008, motorway regulations were applied from Kinnegad to the eastern end of the Athlone bypass. The Kinnegad-Athlone scheme was signed as a motorway (and numbered "M6"). Its road markings were already appropriate to a motorway prior to the change in designation coming into effect; however, motorway regulations were not in force and the speed limit was 100 km/h until 24 September of that year.

=== Athlone-Ballinasloe ===
Construction of this 19-km section of road commenced on 3 September 2007 and opened to traffic on 23 July 2009. It was built as a grade separated HQDC to motorway standard and was redesignated a motorway on 28 August 2009. Prior to this date, the scheme was subject to a reduced speed limit of 100 km/h. The central barrier on this road is a traditional metal barrier rather than the Concrete step barriers, which have become standard on all new dual-carriageways in Ireland and UK in recent years. The Athlone to Ballinasloe scheme was built by SIAC-Willis JV.

=== Ballinasloe-Galway ===
Construction of this 56-km section of M6 began in 2007. This section lies between the town of Ballinasloe and Galway City, running between junctions 14 and 20 on the M6 corridor. The road is a tolled Public-private partnership scheme, and opened under motorway restrictions. The PPP contract was awarded to N6 Concession Limited in April 2007 which comprised FCC Construction S.A. and Itinere Infraestructuras (both major companies from Spain) and P.J. Hegarty & Sons who are a leading Irish Contractor. The contract was signed on 4 April 2007 for 30 years from that date. The construction took approximately 3 years to be completed and the N6 Concessions Limited will be responsible for collection of tolls for a period of approximately 27 years. This scheme was a matter of some controversy at its planning stage. The environmental agency An Taisce claimed that the National Roads Authority's planned route would be "particularly destructive" in passing the site of the 17th-century Battle of Aughrim. The decision to toll the route is also controversial, as the M4 motorway to/from Dublin, which connects with the N6/M6 route, is also tolled. This meant that motorists would have to pay two tolls when driving between Dublin and Galway. It was pointed out, however, that this corresponds with the Authority's plan to have two tolls on each of the main interurban routes. The new section of N6/M6 between Ballinasloe and Galway was also quite unusual in another way: Unlike most national road upgrade projects in Ireland, the new route differed significantly from that of the original N6. The new route runs roughly east–west between the two destinations, rather than dipping south to Loughrea, as the former alignment N6 did. The N65 was extended from Loughrea to the new M6 was constructed to cater for this change. As an emergency measure to restore access from Dublin to Galway after severe flooding at Craughwell on Friday 20 November 2009, an incomplete section of this scheme between Loughrea and Galway Clinic (Doughiska) was opened temporarily.

== Junctions ==
The M6 junction numbers below are used on the entire length of the road. The Athlone bypass had a separate numbering scheme (J1–J6) but was renumbered to its current form (J8–J13) following the upgrade of the bypass in 2011.

| County | km | mi | Junction | Destinations | Notes |
|---|---|---|---|---|---|
County Westmeath
| County Westmeath | 0 | 0 | 1 | M4 | Continues as M4 towards Dublin. |
| County Westmeath | 2 | 1.2 | 2 | R148 ‒ Kinnegad R446 ‒ Milltownpass | |
| County Westmeath | 14.5 | 9 | 3 | R400 – Rochfortbridge, Milltownpass, Rhode | |
| County Westmeath | 20 | 12.4 | 4 | N52 – Mullingar, Tyrrellspass | |
| County Westmeath | 30 | 18.6 | 5 | N52 – Tullamore R389 – Kilbeggan | |
| County Offaly | 43.5 | 27 | 6 | R420 ‒ Moate, Horseleap, Clara | |
County Westmeath
| County Westmeath | 50 | 31.1 | 7 | R446 ‒ Moate, Clonmacnoise | |
| County Westmeath | 53.5 | 33.2 | Athlone Service Area | | |
| County Westmeath | 58 | 36 | 8 | N62 ‒ Athlone, Birr | Heading eastbound, Athlone is followed by the (East) cardinal direction. Continues as N6 dual carriageway. |
| County Westmeath | 59.5 | 36.9 | 9 | R916 – Blyry Industrial Estate N55 ‒ Cavan, Longford, Athlone | |
| County Westmeath | 61.5 | 38.2 | 10 | N55 ‒ Cavan, Longford, Athlone | |
| County Westmeath | 62.5 | 38.8 | 11 | L4023 ‒ Athlone, Coosan | Tullamore (N52) |
| County Roscommon | 64.5 | 40.1 | 12 | N61 ‒ Sligo, Roscommon | LILO junction. |
| County Roscommon | 65.5 | 40.7 | 13 | R362 ‒ Athlone (West), Monksland, Athleague, Tuam | LILO junction. Continues as M6 motorway. |
| County Galway | 85 | 52.8 | 14 | R357 ‒ Ballinasloe, Shannonbridge | Heading eastbound, Ballinasloe is followed by the (East) cardinal direction. |
| County Galway | 89.5 | 55.6 | 15 | R446 – Ballinasloe (West), Aughrim, County Galway R355 – Portumna | Ballinasloe Hospital |
| County Galway | 101.5 | 63 | M6 Toll | | |
| County Galway | 115 | 71.4 | 16 | N65 ‒ Portumna, Loughrea L7182 – Kiltullagh | Galway Plaza Service Area |
| County Galway | 125.5 | 77.9 | 17 | R348 ‒ Athenry R347 ‒ Craughwell | |
| County Galway | 129 | 80.1 | 18 | M17 ‒ Sligo; M18 ‒ Limerick | |
| County Galway | 137 | 85.1 | 19 | R381 ‒ Claregalway, Oranmore | Continues as N6 dual carriageway. |
| County Galway | 140.5 | 87.3 | 20 | N67 ‒ Ennistimon, Galway (East) | Galway Docks; At-grade roundabout junction. Continues as N6 dual carriageway (Bóthar na dTreabh). |
1.000 mi = 1.609 km; 1.000 km = 0.621 mi: Tolled; Route transition

== Motorway service areas ==
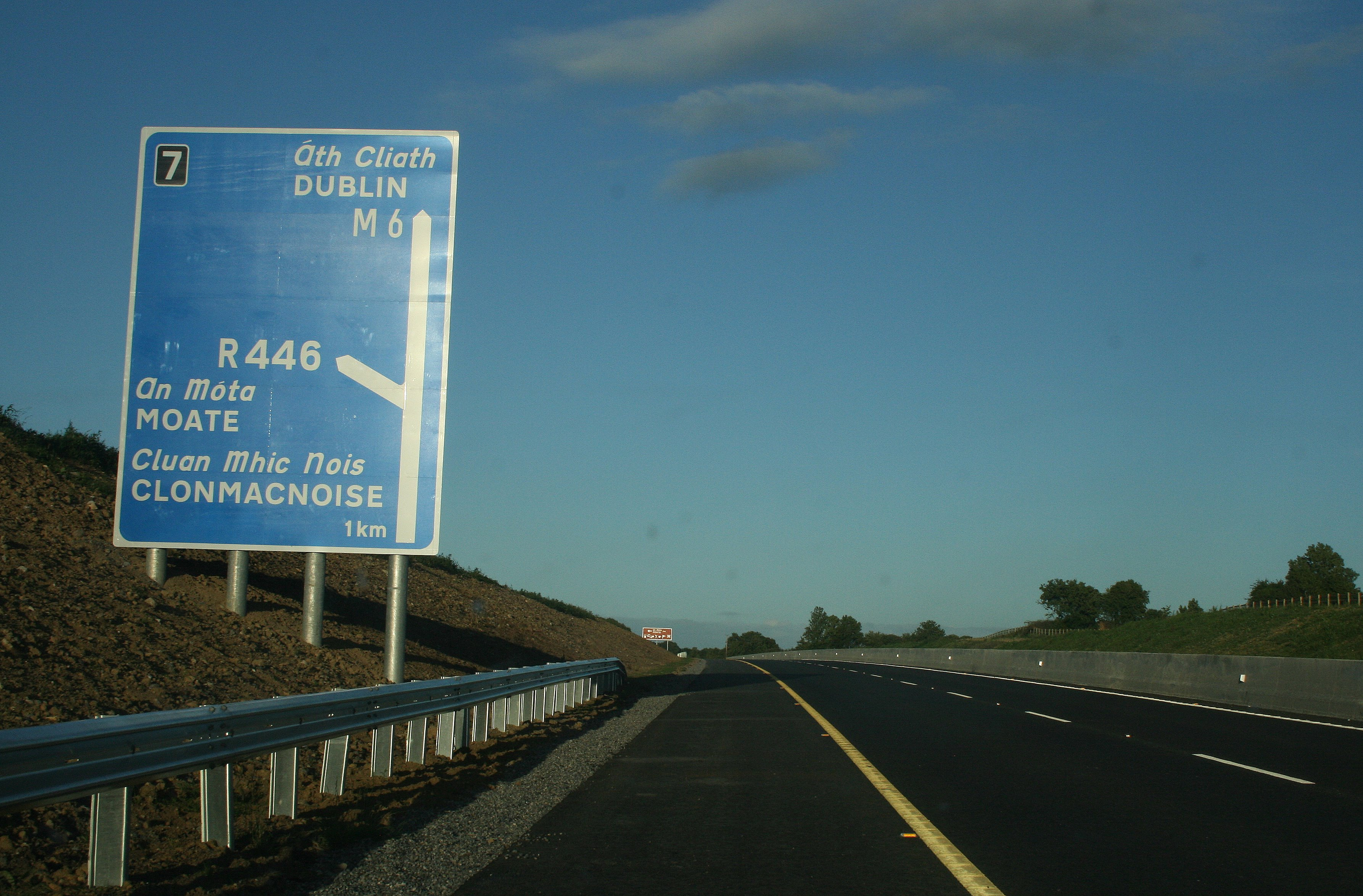
Junction 7 on the M6.

The M6 has two service areas. The Galway Plaza is an off-line service area located at junction 16 near Kiltullagh. It opened in February 2016 and its facilities include a Supermac's, Papa John's Pizza and Spar.

The Athlone Service Area is an on-line service area located between junctions 7 and 8, just east of the town. It was officially opened in September 2019, consisting of a Circle K and McDonalds.

== Tolls ==
Although the M6 is a tolled motorway, there is only a single toll plaza, located at Cappataggle, between junctions 15 Ballinasloe West & 16 Loughrea. Hence there is no toll payable to travel between the eastern end of the motorway and Ballinasloe and also between Loughrea and the western end at Galway city. Tolls may be paid by cash, credit card or through the use of an electronic tag.

== Future ==
=== Motorway redesignations affecting the M6 ===
At present, the M6 motorway leads into the non-motorway Athlone bypass and continues again west of the bypass to Galway. Subject to improvements, the Athlone Bypass may yet come under motorway regulations and be incorporated into the rest of the M6 route.

== See also ==
- Roads in Ireland
- Motorways in Ireland
- National primary road
- National secondary road
- Regional road
- Galway City Ring Road
