= R443 road (Ireland) =

Road in County Offaly, Ireland

R443 road
- Bóthar R443
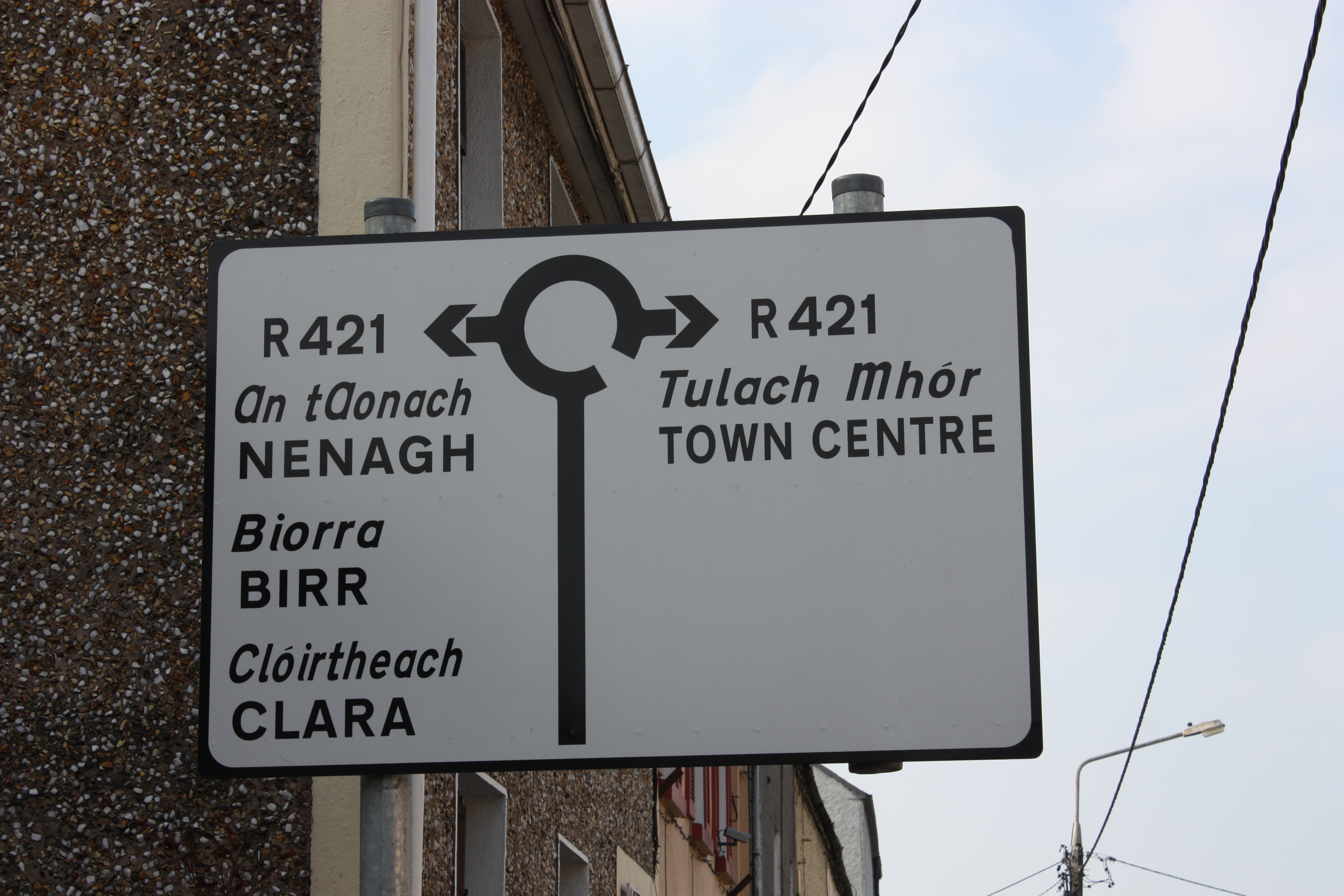
- On O'Moore Street, Tullamore (the R443) before the R421

Route information
- Length: 8.2 km (5.1 mi)

Location
- Country: Ireland
- Primary destinations: Starts at the junction of N52/N80 on the Tullamore Bypass; Clonminch Road; O'Moore Street; Joins the(R421) along Cormac Street for 400m; Kilcrutten Road; Srah Road; Srah Avenue; Collins Lane; Arden Way; Terminates at a roundabout on the N52 Tullamore Bypass

Highway system
- Roads in Ireland; Motorways; Primary; Secondary; Regional

The R443 road is a regional road in Ireland, which forms the northern and western part of an orbital route around the town of Tullamore. The southern and eastern part is formed by the N52 Tullamore bypass. The R443 commences at a roundabout junction with the N52/N80. From here it travels along Clonminch Road (former N80) and O'Moore Street; it then joins the R421 (former N52) for a distance of 400 metres along Cormac Street. The road then continues along the "Western Relief Road" along the western edge of the town. It has roundabout junctions with the R420 Clara Road (former N80) and the R421 Arden Road (former N52) in addition to other roundabouts for industrial, retail and residential estates. The road terminates at a roundabout with the N52 Tullamore bypass on the northern side of the town. The total length of the road is 8.2km.

== See also ==
- Roads in Ireland
- National primary road
- National secondary road
