= David Thompson Seymour =

Commissioner David Thompson Seymour
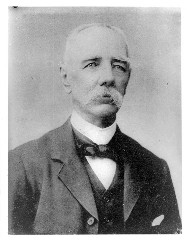

1st Queensland Police Commissioner
- In office January 1864 – October 1895
- Succeeded by: William Parry-Okeden

Personal details
- Born: 5 November 1831 Ballymore Castle, County Galway, Ireland
- Died: 31 January 1916 (aged 84) London, England
- Resting place: Hither Green Cemetery, Lewisham, London
- Spouses: Caroline Matilda Brown (m. 1864; died 1884) Sara Jane Stevenson (m. 1888–1916)

David Thompson Seymour (5 November 1831 – 31 January 1916) was a soldier and the inaugural commissioner of Queensland Police, in office from 1864 to 1895.

== Early life and military career ==
Seymour was born on 5 November 1831 at Ballymore Castle, County Galway, Ireland, son of Thomas Seymour and his wife Matilda Margaret, née Lawrence. Educated at Ennis College, he entered the British Army as an ensign on 1 February 1856, was promoted to lieutenant in the 12th Regiment on 23 February 1858, and served at Limerick and Deal before he arrived in Sydney on 7 July 1859 in command of a draft. On 13 January 1861 he arrived in Brisbane in command of the first detachment in Queensland after separation. He was appointed aide-de-camp and private secretary to the governor on 11 May 1861.

== Queensland Police Commissioner ==
On 1 January 1864 Seymour retired from the army to become acting commissioner of police under the Police Act of 1863 and was confirmed in office in July. The force consisted of 150 white officers and 137 Native Mounted Police to protect a population of 61,497. Beginning with the establishment of a detective force in 1864, he soon expanded and improved the service. A select committee of 1869 supported his complaints against the appointment of police magistrates as officers and his recommendations, based on observations during extensive travel, for improved pay and conditions. The committee also approved his newfound opposition to phasing out the Native Mounted Police. He showed his faith in the native police in 1880 by sending black trackers to Victoria, Australia to participate in rounding up the Kelly gang.

Seymour was never afraid to use force. In the Brisbane riot of September 1866, he ordered his men to fix bayonets and load with live ammunition to disperse a large crowd in Queen Street. Giving evidence to an 1887 board of inquiry on the management of gaols, he was enthusiastic for flogging. In the 1894 pastoral strike the police were given sole power to 'preserve order and secure liberty to all alike' to avoid the expensive and controversial involvement of the military as in the 1891 strike, and he took command in Longreach, Winton, and other centres. After his request for greater legal power to compensate for limited manpower, the government introduced the controversial peace preservation bill, which permitted detention without trial for periods up to two months.

On 30 June 1895 Seymour retired on a pension of £700: he had increased police strength to 907 men which still included 104 Native Mounted Police. He had given some attention to social questions: his suggested new route via the Red Sea and Torres Strait for immigrant ships reduced the time of the voyage by half, and in 1878 he advocated a reformatory for girls under fourteen years of age. But his chief private interests were horse racing and athletics. A foundation member and a committee-man of the Queensland Turf Club for over thirty years, he was also a committee-man of the Queensland Club.

== Personal life ==
On 28 June 1864 in Brisbane Seymour had married Caroline Matilda (d.1884), daughter of William Anthony Brown, sheriff of Queensland; they had six daughters. He married Sara Jane Stevenson, aged 23, on 6 June 1888; of their two sons, one became a well-known engineer in Kuala Lumpur. He died on 31 January 1916 in London and was buried in Hither Green Cemetery in Lewisham.
