= R356 road (Ireland) =

Road in central and western Ireland

R356 road
- Bóthar R356
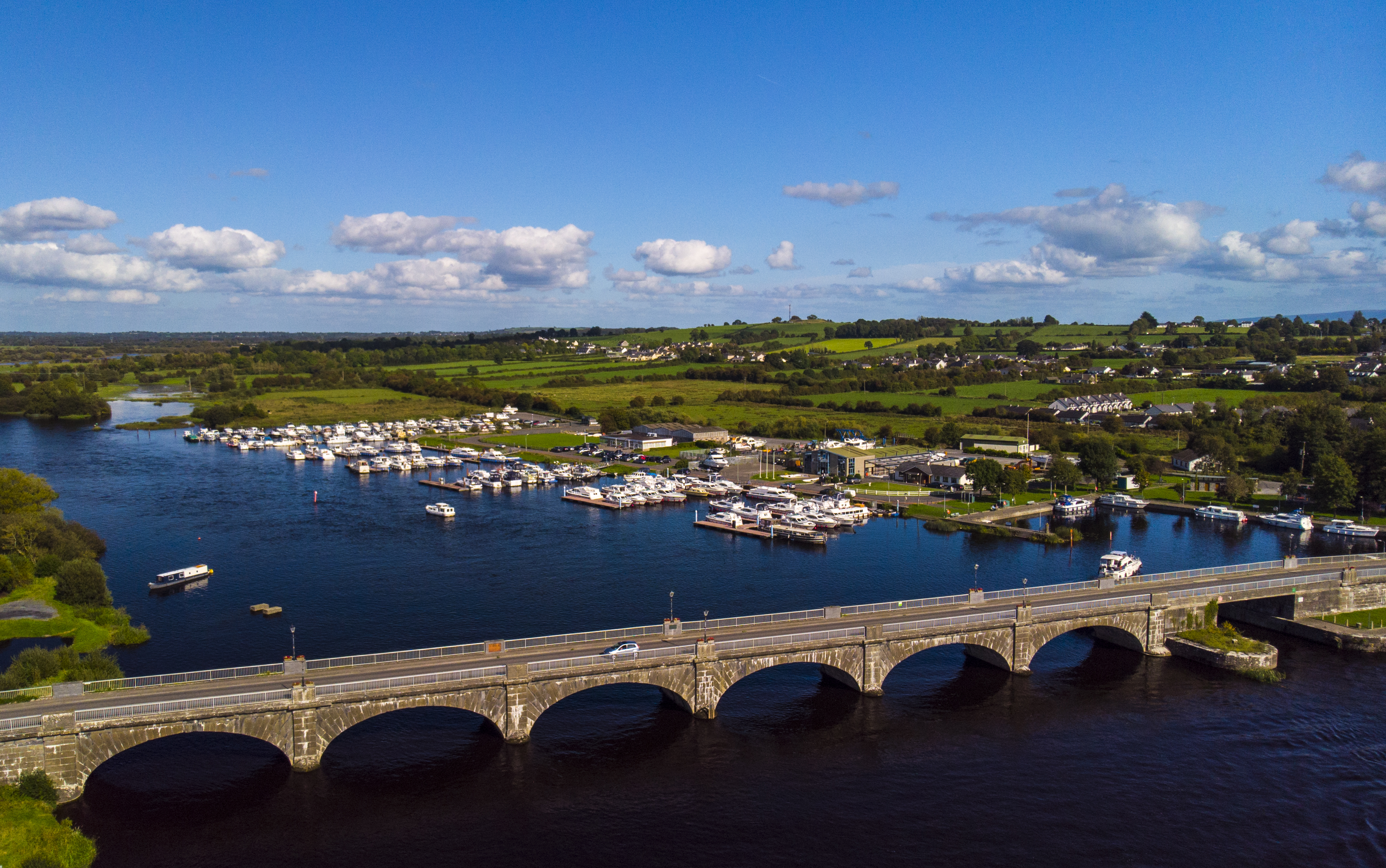
- Banagher Bridge across the River Shannon, part of the R356

Route information
- Length: 32 km (20 mi)

Location
- Country: Ireland
- Primary destinations: County Galway; Killimor – leaves the N65; (R355); Eyrecourt; County Offaly; Crosses the River Shannon at Banagher bridge; Banagher; (R439); (R438); Cloghan - joins the N62

Highway system
- Roads in Ireland; Motorways; Primary; Secondary; Regional

The R356 road is a regional road in Ireland; it links Killimor, County Galway with Cloghan, County Offaly. The road also travels through the towns of Eyrecourt and Banagher. At Banagher, the road crosses the River Shannon via a seven arch bridge. This bridge was erected by the Commissioners for the Improvement of Navigation of the Shannon in 1841–1843.

The road is approximately 32 km in length.

== Details ==
The R356 commences at a T-junction with the N65 National secondary road in Killimor. The road continues in an eastwards direction before joining the R355 road for about 1 km of the journey. After leaving the R355 the road continues eastwards towards Eyrecourt. This section of the road is of very poor quality. Sharp bends, poor quality surface and a very narrow alignment are common throughout this section. The road enters Eyrecourt as River Street and Main Street. At the end of Main Street there is a very sharp turn to stay on the R356. From Eyrecourt the quality of road improves somewhat and travels alongside the River Shannon before crossing the river on the Banagher bridge and bringing the road from County Galway into County Offaly. The road continues into Banagher as Main Street. In Main Street a T-junction is formed with the R439 road. In order to stay on the R356 one must turn left (coming from County Galway) and continue on the Harbour Road. Further on the road forms a junction with the R438 road and the road continues on towards Cloghan. The road terminates at the junction with the N62 National secondary road.

== See also ==
- Roads in Ireland
- National primary road
- National secondary road
