= Thomas Bernard Hackett =

Recipient of the Victoria Cross

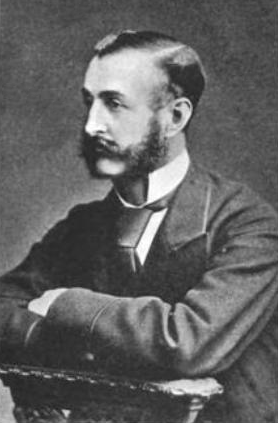
- Born: 15 June 1836; Riverstown, County Tipperary
- Died: 5 October 1880 (aged 44); Arrabeg, King's County
- Burial place: Lockeen Churchyard, County Tipperary
- Military career
- Allegiance: United Kingdom
- Branch: British Army
- Rank: Lieutenant colonel
- Units: 23rd Regiment of Foot
- Conflicts: Crimean War; Indian Mutiny; Third Anglo-Ashanti War
- Awards: Victoria Cross

Lieutenant Colonel Thomas Bernard Hackett VC (15 June 1836 – 5 October 1880) was born in Riverstown, County Tipperary and was an Irish recipient of the Victoria Cross, the highest and most prestigious award for gallantry in the face of the enemy that can be awarded to British and Commonwealth forces.

== Details ==
He was 21 years old, and a lieutenant in the 23rd Regiment of Foot (later The Royal Welch Fusiliers), British Army during the Indian Mutiny when the following deed took place for which he was awarded the VC. On 18 November 1857 at Secundra Bagh, Lucknow, India, Lieutenant Hackett, with George Monger, rescued a corporal of his Regiment, who was lying wounded and exposed to heavy fire. He also showed conspicuous bravery when, under heavy fire, he ascended the roof and cut the thatch of a bungalow to prevent its being set on fire. His citation reads:

23rd Regiment, Lieutenant (now Captain) Thomas Bernard Hackett

Date of Act of Bravery, 18th November, 1857

For daring gallantry at Secundra Bagh, Lucknow, on the 18th November, 1857, in having with others, rescued a Corporal of the 23rd Regiment, who was lying wounded and exposed to very heavy fire. Also, for conspicuous bravery, in having, under a heavy fire, ascended the roof, and cut down the thatch of a Bungalow, to prevent its being set on fire. This was a most important service at the time.

He later achieved the rank of lieutenant colonel. He died at Arrabeg, King's County (now County Offaly) in a firearm accident on 5 October 1880. His VC is on display in the Lord Ashcroft Gallery at the Imperial War Museum, London.

== Arms ==
Coat of arms of Thomas Bernard Hackett

Notes
Granted 6 August 1856 by Sir John Bernard Burke, Ulster King of Arms.
Crest
A demi-panther Argent spotted Azure collared Gules charged on the shoulder with a trefoil slipped Vert and holding in the dexter paw a branch of the last.
Escutcheon
Sable three piles pointing to the base Argent the centre one charged with a trefoil slipped Vert on a chief Gules a lion passant guardant Or.
Motto
Virtute Et Fidelitate
