= Lehinch =

Townland in County Tipperary, Ireland

Coordinates: 52°56′N 9°21′W

Lehinch (An Leithinse in Irish) is a townland in the barony of Ormond Lower, County Tipperary in Ireland. It is located east of Portumna bridge, in the civil parish of Lorrha.
