= R428 road (Ireland) =

Road in Ireland

Coordinates: 53.015767°N 7.129616°W

R428 road
- Bóthar R428

Route information
- Length: 13.7 km (8.5 mi)

Major junctions
- From: N80 Stradbally
- Enters County Kildare; Crosses Grand Canal
- To: N78 Athy

Location
- Country: Ireland

Highway system
- Roads in Ireland; Motorways; Primary; Secondary; Regional

The R428 road, also called the Athy Road, is a regional road in Ireland, located in County Kildare and County Laois.

The road formerly used to end at Duke Street on the former N78 (now L4015) in Athy, however, due to the opening of the new Athy Distributor Road, it turns right from Woodstock Street onto William Street, crosses the Grand Canal, and continues for about a kilometre and a half until the roundabout adjacent to Blackparks. Motorists can then continue straight onto the N78 towards Castlecomer.
