= Loughkeen =

Townland in County Tipperary, Ireland

Loughkeen (Baile Locha Caoin in Irish) is a townland and a civil parish in the barony of Ormond Lower, County Tipperary in Ireland. It is located south-west of Riverstown in the extreme north of the county.

== See also ==
- List of civil parishes of County Tipperary
