= Arless =

Village in County Laois, Ireland

Arles Ardlios
- Village
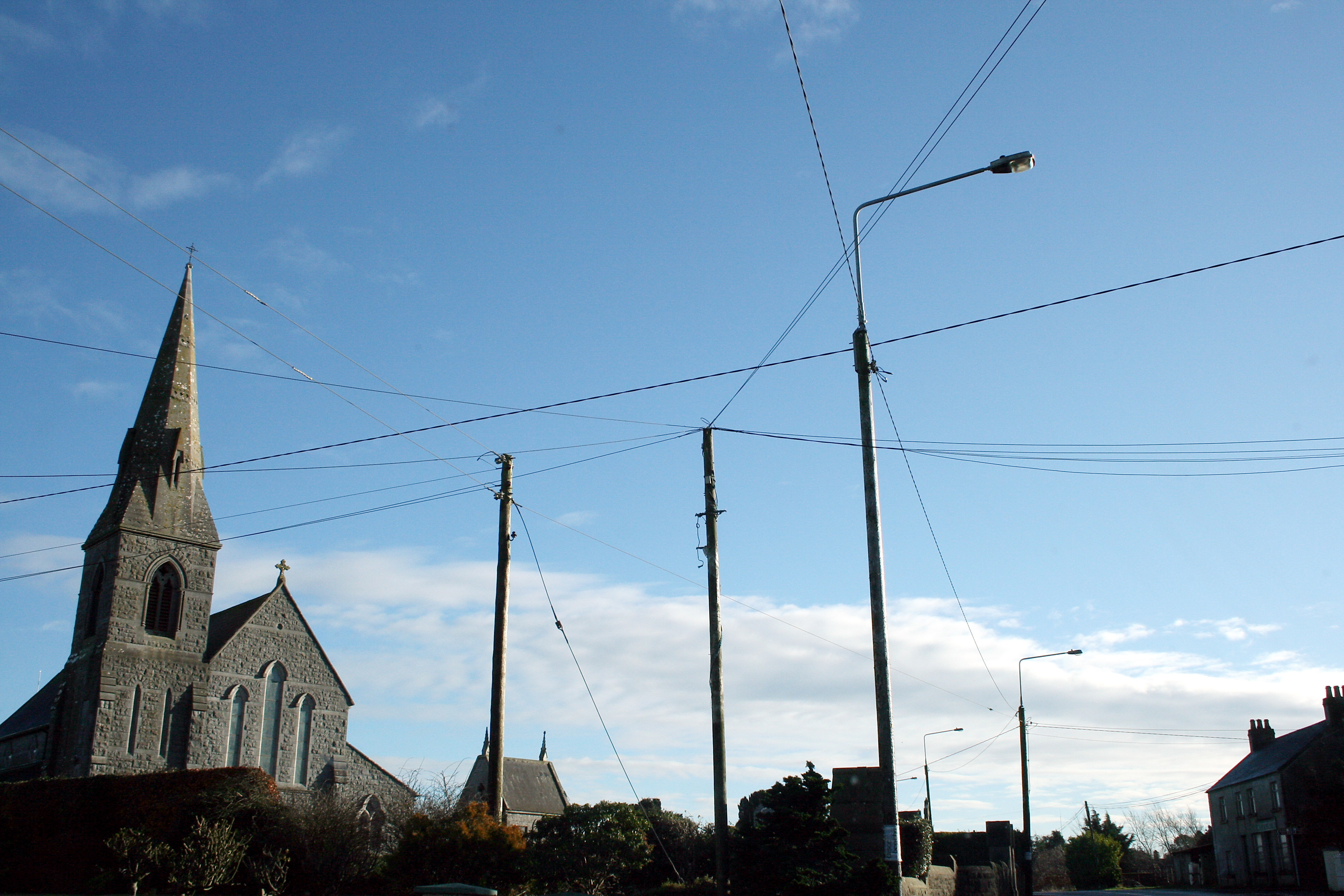
- Arles village and church

- Location in Ireland
- Coordinates: 52°53′34″N 7°01′15″W
- Country: Ireland
- Province: Leinster
- County: County Laois
- Time zone: UTC+0 (WET)
  - Summer (DST): UTC-1 (IST (WEST))

Arles or Arless (historically Ardlisse, from Irish: Ard Lios, meaning 'high ringfort') is a village in County Laois, Ireland. It lies 2 kilometres (1.2 mi) northwest of Ballickmoyler and 10 km (6 mi) northwest of Carlow, on the N80 national secondary road.

Located close to Carlow, the village has expanded in size since its foundation, when it comprised just a few houses around the church. The church was built in the 1680s (according to an inscription on a stone in the wall) and originally had a thatched roof. A mausoleum to the Grace family was built in the churchyard in 1818.

== Public transport ==
On weekdays, the village is served by JJ Kavanagh and Sons Abbeyleix/Portlaoise-Athy-Carlow bus route with two daily journeys each way. Bus Éireann route 73 from Waterford to Athlone passes through the village but does not stop there. Carlow railway station is the nearest train station.

== See also ==
- List of towns and villages in Ireland
