= Banagher bridge =

Banagher Bridge
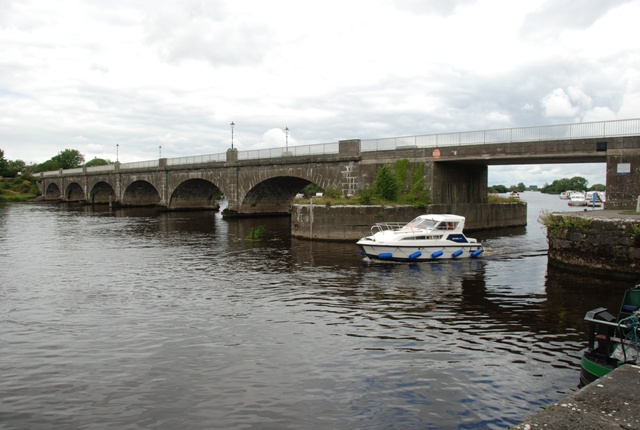
- Coordinates: 53.1935°N 7.9927°W
- Carries: Cars & Pedestrians
- Crosses: River Shannon
- Locale: Banagher
- Heritage status: Listed in NIAH
- NIAH Number: 14810034

Characteristics
- Design: Arch bridge
- Material: Stone Masonry
- Total length: 160 metres (520 ft)
- No. of spans: 7

History
- Opened: c. 1841 - 1843

Banagher Bridge is located northwest of the town of Banagher, and carries the R356 road across the River Shannon between Counties Offaly and Galway in Ireland. The present bridge, constructed between 1841 and 1843 has six masonry arches and had an opening section which has been replaced by a permanent beam.

== Present bridge ==
The present bridge, originally of six arches and an opening section, was erected by the Commissioners for the Improvement of Navigation of the Shannon in 1841–1843. Thomas Rhodes, the engineer was a commissioner of the Shannon Navigation, his name can be seen on a number of the bridges over the Shannon and on surviving lock mechanisms, including at Victoria and Athlone locks. This bridge was reconstructed and widened jointly by Offaly County Council and Galway County Council in 1971. Their work included replacing large stone parapets on either side of the bridge with aluminium railings, and the removal of a swivel arch which had allowed passage for masted boats.

The bridge is categorised by the National Inventory of Architectural Heritage as being of 'Special Architectural, Historical and Historical interest'. The 2005 heritage review of the bridges of County Offaly described Banagher bridge as being of national heritage significance, of high architectural merit and demonstrative of mid-19th century construction work by a government body. It states "This is the only six-arch masonry span in the county. It is an interesting contrast with the 1750s bridge at Shannonbridge. Although both are approximately the same length, Banagher bridge achieves the crossing with fewer spans (six as opposed to 16). It also has the longest masonry arch spans of all the county's bridges, averaging 17.88 m".

== History ==
The first bridge that is known to have been built at this point was erected as a "spacious stone bridge of 18 arches" by Ruaidrí Ua Conchobair, the King of Connacht, around 1049. However, medieval sources tell of a "bridge of 27 arches of divers(e) architectural form, each different from its fellow", which stood here for over 500 years. A stone bridge of 17 arches was constructed in 1685 and this was detailed in profile drawings by Thomas Rhodes in 1833. The bridge of 1685 featured during the Williamite War in Ireland of the 17th century and was used by Patrick Sarsfield to retreat to Connacht after his ambush of a Williamite convoy at Ballyneety in County Limerick during the Siege of Limerick. Because it afforded Sarsfield and his army a method of advance and retreat, the old bridge was sometimes referred to as Sarsfield's Bridge. This bridge was blown up in 1843 by gunpowder by a section of the Corps of Royal Engineers. The abutment of this bridge can still be seen adjacent to Cromwell's Castle on the Connacht side of the river.

The castellations around and near the bridge were built to protect it, including Cromwell's Castle, The Salt Battery (Fort Eliza), Fort Falkland and the Martello Tower. The guns mounted on these forts could be used to destroy the bridge if necessary, as well as to bombard attacking forces on the river.

A narrow quay passes under the old swivel section of the bridge from Waller's Quay to the marina. A handrail offers the pedestrian some protection against a slip into the river. This rail has been known as the Duke's Rail since 1897 when the then Duke of York, later to become George V, paid a state visit to Ireland. The royal party travelled up-river from Portumna on the steamship Countess of Mayo. Disembarking at Waller's Quay, the Duke was received by Lord Rosse, the Lord Lieutenant of King's County. The party had to traverse the narrow quay under the bridge to get to Banagher Railway Station, making use of the Duke's Rail. The stretch of the Shannon from Portumna to Banagher was known for some time after as the Duke of York's Route.
