= Portumna bridge =

Road bridge over the River Shannon, Ireland

Portumna Bridge
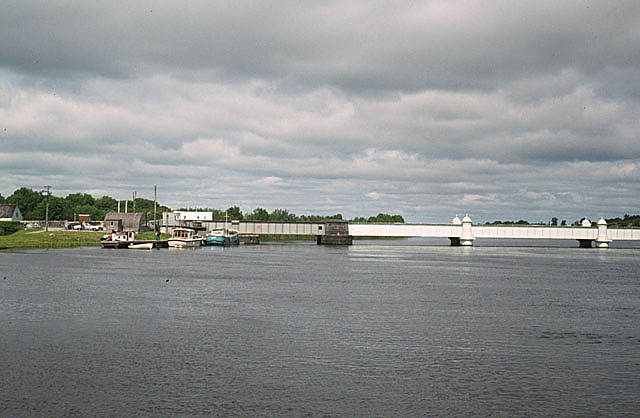
- Coordinates: 53°05′N 8°11′W
- Crosses: River Shannon
- Locale: Between County Galway and County Tipperary

Characteristics
- Design: Swing bridge

Location
- Interactive map of Portumna Bridge

Portumna bridge lies east of the town of Portumna, in County Galway, Ireland. It is a five-span road bridge, which carries the N65 across the River Shannon to Lehinch in County Tipperary. The present bridge was designed by C. E. Stanier of London, and completed in 1911, with a central section resting on Hayes's Island which divides the river into two channels. The structure of the main bridge, consisting of steel girders supported by concrete filled cast iron cylinders, and the pivoting swing bridge over the navigation channel, are of technical and engineering interest. The house on Hayes Island, accessed from the bridge, was the bridge operator's house and pre-dates the present bridge. The opening section was replaced in October 2008.

== Navigation ==
Situated about 1 mile to the north of where the River Shannon enters Lough Derg, Portumna Bridge must be opened to allow craft with more than 4 ft of air draft to pass by. The bridge is opened only at fixed times. There are quays both north and south of the bridge where craft may tie up while they wait for the bridge to open and there are mid-stream pontoons both upstream and downstream of the bridge.
