= Lawrencetown, County Galway =

Lawrencetown Baile Mór Shíol Anmchadha
- Village
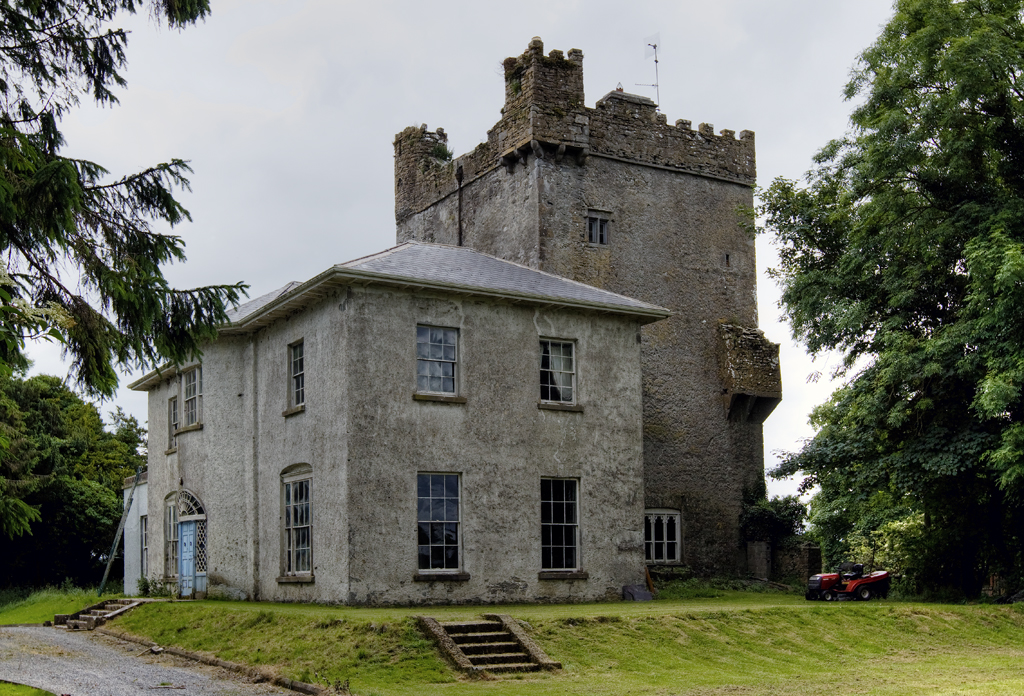
- Ballymore Castle in Lawrencetown

- Location in Ireland
- Coordinates: 53°14′12″N 8°10′29″W
- Country: Ireland
- Province: Connacht
- County: County Galway
- Elevation: 83 m (272 ft)
- Time zone: UTC+0 (WET)
  - Summer (DST): UTC-1 (IST (WEST))
- Irish Grid Reference: M880199

Lawrencetown or Laurencetown (Irish: Baile Mór Shíol Anmchadha or simply Baile Mór), historically called Oghilmore and later Ballymore, is a village in County Galway, Ireland. Located on the R355 regional road nine miles south of Ballinasloe, it lies in the barony of Longford, the civil parish of Clonfert, the Catholic parish of Lawrencetown and Kiltormer, and the townland (earlier) of Lissreaghaun and (later) of Laurencetown or Ballymore; it was historically in the poor law union of Ballinasloe.

== History ==
The place was originally known as Oghilmore, from the nearby castle of O'Hill, now long ruinous. The village received its present name from the Lawrence family from Ashton Hall outside Lancaster, which was active in the English administration of Connaught in the sixteenth century, when John Lawrence acquired by marriage with the O'Maddens extensive lands in the Barony of Longford, and in about 1585 erected Ballymore Castle. The village was founded about 1700 and given the name Laurencetown, and expanded about 1750. The family, hitherto Catholic, converted to Protestantism between 1729 and 1749. At this point, relying on a fortune left to him by his mother and deriving in part from slave-estates on Montserrat in the West Indies, the then Walter Laurence built an imposing mansion known as Belview just outside the town, set in an impressive parkland. In 1782 the Irish Parliament was freed from English control in domestic matters, and the then Colonel Walter Lawrence built a monument, known as the Volunteer Arch, with a Latin inscription which translates as ‘Liberty after a long servitude was won on 16 April 1782 by the armed sons of Hibernia, who with heroic fortitude regained their ancient laws and established their ancient independence.’ In the 1780s the Prince of Wales visited Belview. The Castle was refurbished in 1815.

Following the Great Famine in the 1840s the estate fell into financial difficulties, and 4,300 acres of land became part of the Encumbered Estates process. The Laurence family retained the land in the vicinity of the house, but it was heavily burdened with debt, and, what with that and with family disputes, by about 1908 there were no Laurences left in residence at Laurencetown. By 1912 there was a sale of the art held in the house, and lands were being sold to tenants. In the 1920s a final sale took place.

A Topographical Dictionary of 1837 records that the village was then the centre of an RIC police district. Petty sessions were held each Thursday, and items of carpentry and joinery produced. Fairs were held on 8 May, 22 August and 15 December, for cattle, sheep and pigs; there was a market house, octagonal in shape and supported by arches, through which carts of produce could pass to be weighed. There was a Catholic church and a Wesleyan Methodist chapel and school. In addition to Walter Lawrence at Belview, other gentry had residences near the village: P. Blake at Gortnamona, Simeon Seymour at Somerset House and the Rev. J. Hannigan at Somerset Glebe, and Thomas Seymour at Ballymore Castle.

== Amenities ==
Lawrencetown is now in the Roman Catholic parish of Lawrencetown and Kiltormer and has a church called St Mary's, from the dedication of the ancient holy well nearby; there is a detached parochial house.

Facilities in the village include the community hall, the national school, two pubs and a shop, as well as a children's playground and a bee and butterfly garden. In 2020 a lit walking track was opened with the aid of LEADER funding; four old public water pumps were also refurbished.

== See also ==
- List of towns and villages in Ireland
