= N62 road (Ireland) =

Road in Ireland

N62 road
- Bóthar N62
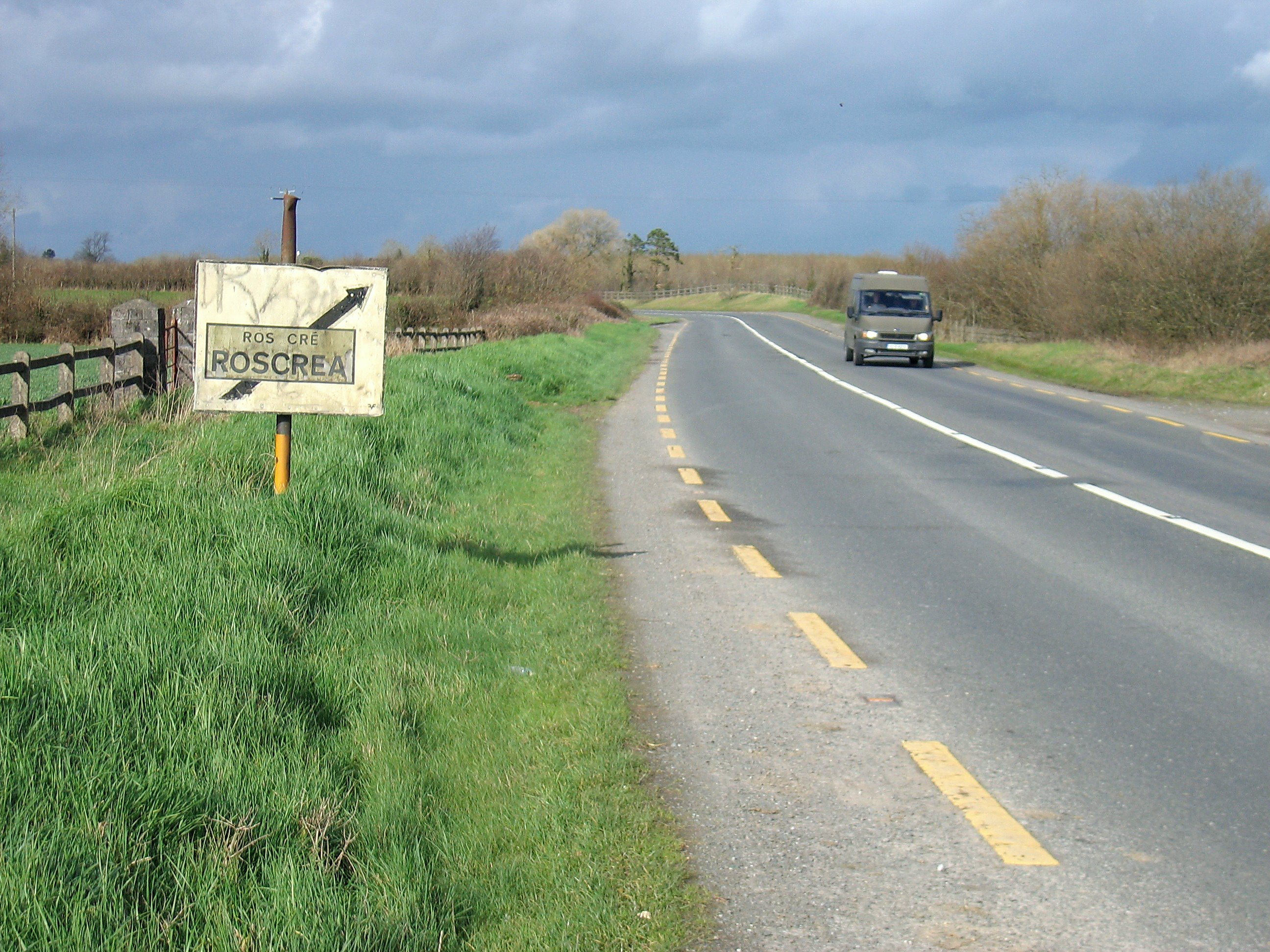
- N62 in County Tipperary with old direction sign

Route information
- Length: 96.625 km (60.040 mi)

Location
- Country: Ireland
- Primary destinations: County Westmeath; Near Athlone, leaves M6; Ballynahowen; County Offaly; Doon; Ferbane (R436) River Brosna; Crosses the Grand Canal; Cloghan (R357) (R356); Galros; Join N52; Birr leave N52; Sharavogue (R491); County Tipperary; Roscrea (R445); crosses the Limerick - Ballybrophy railway line; M7 (J22), Templemore (R501) (R502) (R433); Crosses the Dublin-Cork railway line; Thurles (N75) (R498) (R660); Crosses the River Suir; Terminates at the M8

Highway system
- Roads in Ireland; Motorways; Primary; Secondary; Regional

The N62 road is a national secondary road in Ireland. It links the M6 motorway east of Athlone, County Westmeath with junction 6 of the M8 motorway at Kilnoe near Horse and Jockey in County Tipperary, 96.625 kilometres (60.040 mi) to the south (map). The route also forms a junction with the M7 motorway south of Roscrea.

The government legislation that defines the N62, the Roads Act 1993 (Classification of National Roads) Order 2012 (Statutory Instrument 53 of 2012), provides the following official description:

N62: Fardrum, County Westmeath - Birr, County Offaly - Horse and Jockey, County Tipperary

Between its junction with M6 at Creggan Lower in the county of Westmeath and its junction with N52 at Kennedys Cross in the county of Offaly via Creggan Upper, Fardrum, Kilgarvan, Kilbillaghan and Ballynahown in the county of Westmeath: Doon Cross, Corbane; Main Street at Ferbane; Gallen, Noggusduff; Ferbane Street and Banagher Street at Cloghan; Derrinlough and Bollinarig Big in the county of Offaly

and

between its junction with N52 at Railway Road in the town of Birr and its junction with the N8 at Kilnoe in the county of North Tipperary via Railway Road in the town of Birr: Rath Beg, Sharavogue and Drumakeenan in the county of Offaly: Birr Road, The Crescent, Lourdes Road and Dublin Road in the town of Roscrea: Benamore, Tullaskeagh, Parkmore, Derrymore, Gortnagowna and Borrisbeg in the county of North Tipperary: Church Street, Main Street, Patrick Street, Richmond and Thurles Road in the town of Templemore: Ballybristy and Knockauns in the county of North Tipperary: Brittas Road, Smith OBrien Street, O’Donovan Rossa Street (and via Parnell Street and Cúchulainn Road) Liberty Square and Slievenamon Road in the town of Thurles: Turtulla Bridge and Drumgower in the county of North Tipperary.

== Road quality ==
The road commences at junction 8 on the M6 east of Athlone and continues for a short distance as a dual carriageway forming a short section of the Athlone bypass. Following the roundabout junction with the R446 towards Athlone town, the road is a single carriageway two-lane throughout. The route passes through towns such as Ferbane, Birr, Roscrea, Templemore and Thurles and has not bypassed any of the towns and villages along its route. The quality of the surface, pavement and alignment varies, but it has no stretch of fully realigned 'two-lane with hard shoulders' section.

Some sections are very poor indeed (see gallery). Road marking and signage is good to excellent on most of the route.

== R498-N62 link road ==
In 2011, a road to link the N62 with the R498 was built. Taking a small portion of the L4121 local road near Tipperary Institute, the road was already widened and turned off into a new road going over the main Dublin-Cork line with a new bridge to be constructed and joining the N62 at Gortataggart. This new stretch of road is currently part of the R498, as designated by Transport Infrastructure Ireland in 2012. North Tipperary County Council was in charge of its construction.

== Thurles bypass ==
Plans extant in July 2011 for a bypass to connect the N62 North (before Thurles) N75 and R498 road with N62 South (past Thurles) were approved and were in route selection. It appeared likely the R498-N62 link road would be part of the new bypass.

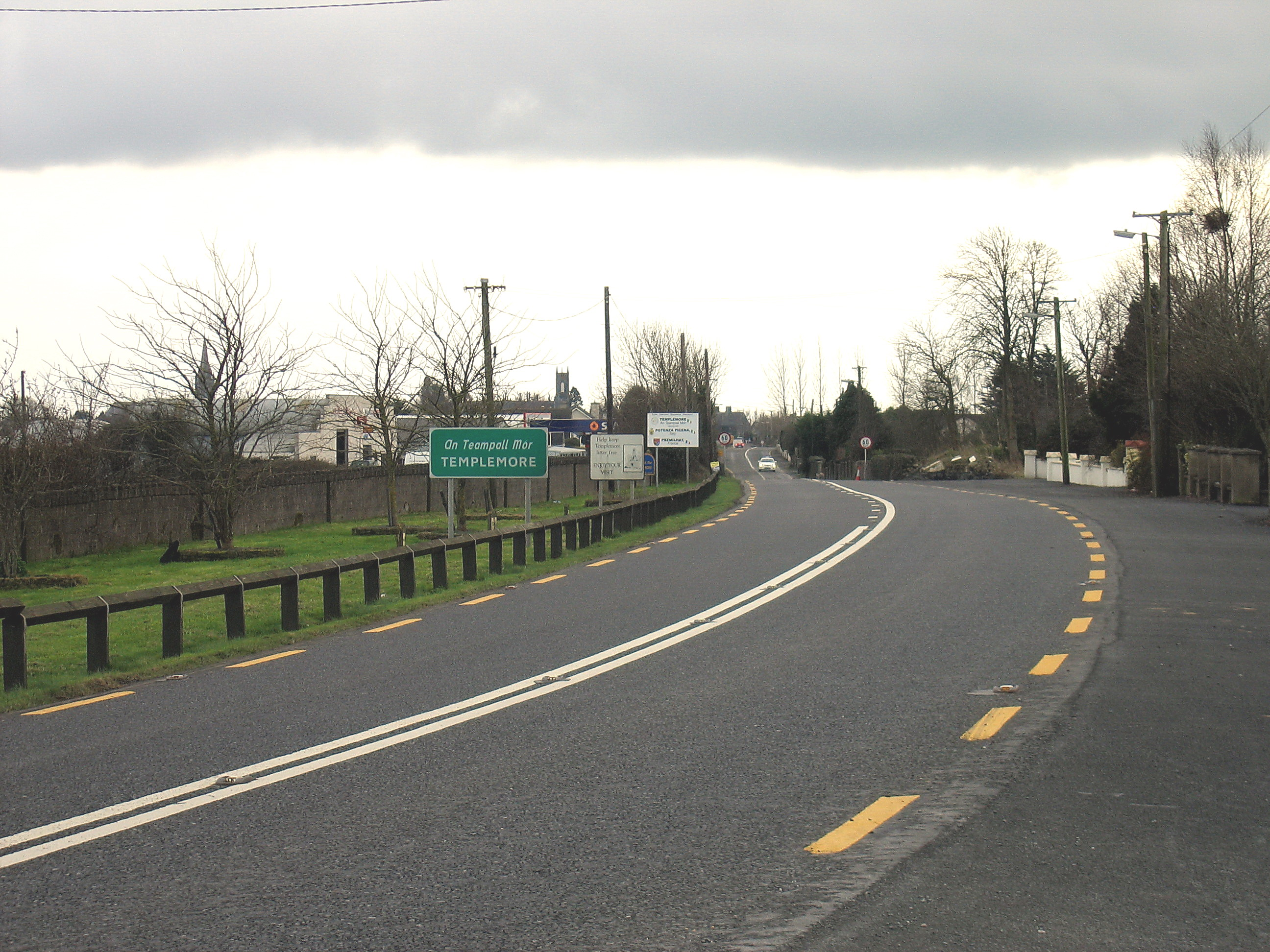
Templemore

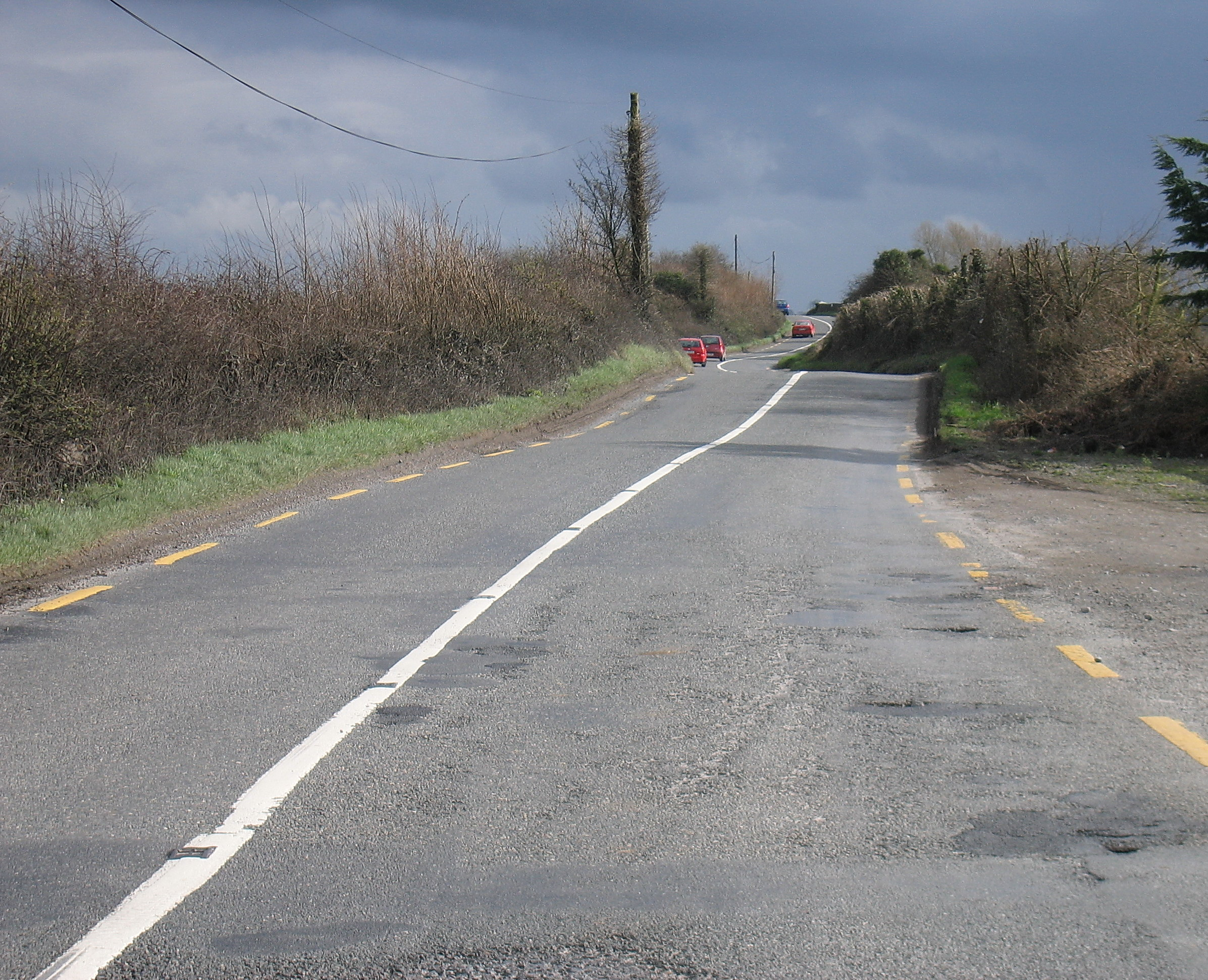
Some sections are very poor.

== See also ==
- Roads in Ireland
- Motorways in Ireland
- National primary road
- Regional road
