= Eyrecourt =

Village in County Galway, Ireland

Eyrecourt Dún an Uchta
- Village
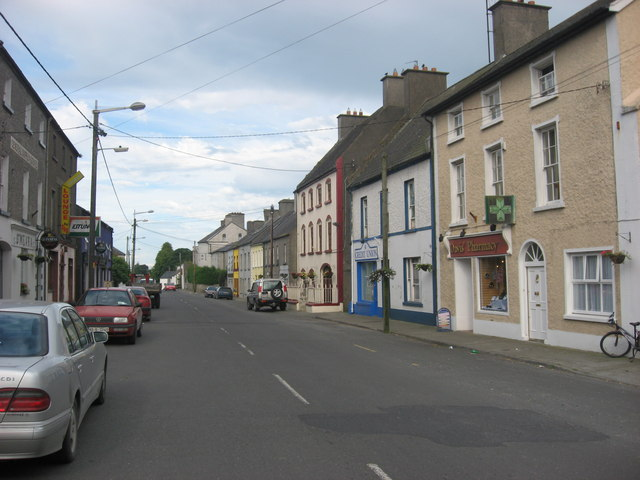
- Main Street

- Location in Ireland
- Coordinates: 53.2°N 8.132°W
- Country: Ireland
- Province: Connacht
- County: County Galway
- Elevation: 55 m (180 ft)

Population (2022)
  - Total: 254
- Time zone: UTC+0 (WET)
  - Summer (DST): UTC-1 (IST (WEST))
- Irish Grid Reference: M911163

Eyrecourt, historically known as Donanaghta (Irish: Dún an Uchta), is a village in County Galway, Ireland. It is on the R356 regional road 12 km (7 mi) west of the Banagher bridge over the River Shannon.

== History ==
The Eyres after whom the village is named, as well as other places such as Eyre Square in Galway City, were an English family who came over with Cromwell. Their former residence, Eyrecourt Castle (now a ruin), provides the large metal gateway at the eastern end of main street and the 100-acre (0.40 km^{2}) castle lawn beyond. The family were for many years closely associated with the local hunt, the Galway Blazers.

== Amenities ==
The village stands midway along the Beara-Breifne Way; a historic way-marked way for walking, cycling and heritage. Eyrecourt is served by two public houses, library, shop, garage and fast food outlet, pharmacy, tractor dealership, medical centre, primary school, several small enterprises and the Meelick-Eyrecourt GAA club. Various groups and classes use the village hall, including for Pilates, martial arts, scouting, art classes, badminton and other sports. Local sporting clubs include a kayaking club.

Every second year in June the village hosts a festival of early machinery, the "Eyrecourt Vintage Festival", when old tractors, steam-engines and early farm machines are displayed. Each September Eyrecourt also hosts an agricultural show, which includes livestock shows and baking and gardening competitions.

Eyrecourt is approximately 70 km (1 hour by car) from Galway and 150 km (2 hours by car) from Dublin.

== International relations ==
Eyrecourt is twinned with the village of Gouesnach in Brittany.

== Parish ==
The parish of Eyrecourt in south east County Galway incorporates the ancient ecclesiastical centres of Dunanaughta, Clonfert and Meelick and is bounded by the Rivers Shannon and Suck for 16 miles (26 km).

Within Dunanaughta there are two churches; the Catholic Church of St Brendan which has some notable stained glass windows, (the work of John Early of Dublin) and the Church of Ireland Church of St John the Baptist (an Anglo Gothic structure built in 1867). Meelick has the oldest Catholic church in Ireland with continuous use since 1414 AD. Clonfert has the grave of Saint Brendan "The Navigator" and Clonfert Cathedral (with its architecturally notable doorway), and a 14th-century statue of "Our Lady of Clonfert".

== Transport ==
Eyrecourt is connected with one bus line. The local link line 547 connects Portumna and Ballinasloe with an intermediate stop in Eyrecourt. In Ballinasloe, the route ends at the train station where a connection can be made with trains for Galway and Dublin. Monday to Saturday, there are four journeys in each direction. On Sundays, only two journeys are made.

== Notable people ==
- Charles Burton, High Court judge
- Cornelius Coughlan, Victoria Cross recipient
- Roger Whittaker, singer-songwriter (born in Nairobi but lived in Eyrecourt)
- Joe Salmon, Galway hurler grew up in Eyrecourt

== See also ==
- List of towns and villages in Ireland
- List of steam fairs
- Market Houses in Ireland
