= Cloghan, County Offaly =

Cloghan An Clochán
- Town
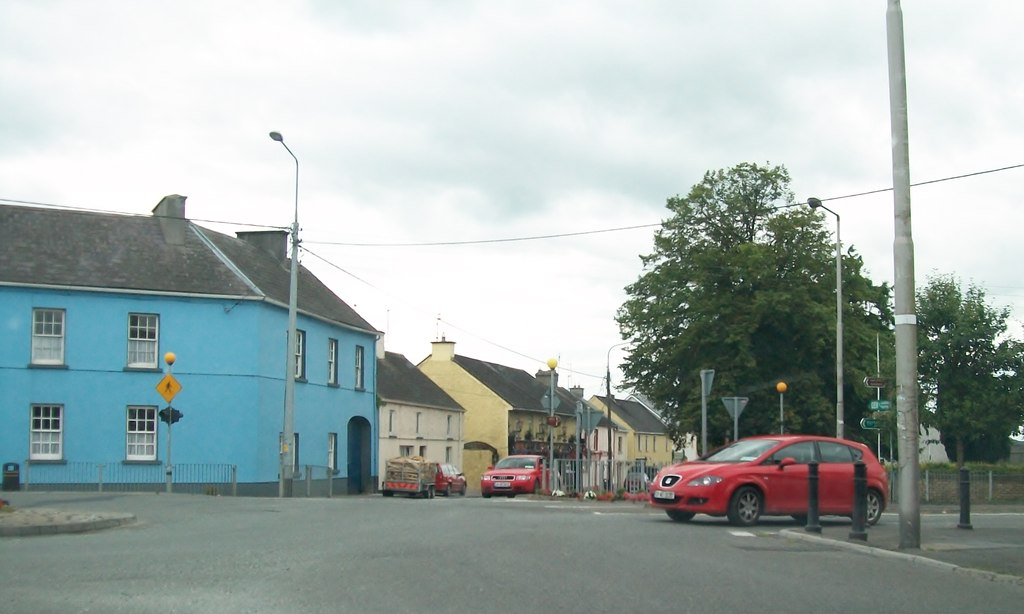
- Junction of the N62 and R357 roads

- Location in Ireland
- Coordinates: 53°13′26″N 7°53′02″W
- Country: Ireland
- Province: Leinster
- County: Offaly
- Elevation: 55 m (180 ft)

Population (2022)
  - Total: 654
- Time zone: UTC+0 (WET)
  - Summer (DST): UTC-1 (IST (WEST))
- Irish Grid Reference: N075196

Cloghan (Irish: An Clochán, meaning 'stepping stones" or "stone structure') is a town in County Offaly, Ireland. It is located, in the civil parish of Gallen, at the intersection of the N62 National secondary road and the R356 and R357 regional roads. As of the 2022 census, Cloghan had a population of 654 people.

== Amenities ==
The local national (primary) school, St. Mary's National School, had an enrollment of approximately 100 pupils as of 2024.

The Catholic church in Cloghan, also named for St. Mary, was built c. 1860. It is in Cloghan & Banagher parish in the Diocese of Ardagh and Clonmacnoise.

== Transportation ==
Belmont and Cloghan railway station opened on 29 May 1884, closed for passenger traffic on 24 February 1947, and finally closed altogether on 1 January 1963.

== Sport ==
St. Rynagh's GAA club are based in Cloghan and play their games at the local sports field. The club was founded in 1961 and has since won 20 Offaly Senior Hurling Championship titles. Teams representing Cloghan have also won a number of Offaly Intermediate Football Championships.

== Notable people ==
- Greg Hughes (1939–2014), Gaelic footballer
- Jacksepticeye (born 1990), YouTuber

== See also ==
- List of towns and villages in Ireland
