= N65 road (Ireland) =

Road in Ireland

N65 road
- Bóthar N65
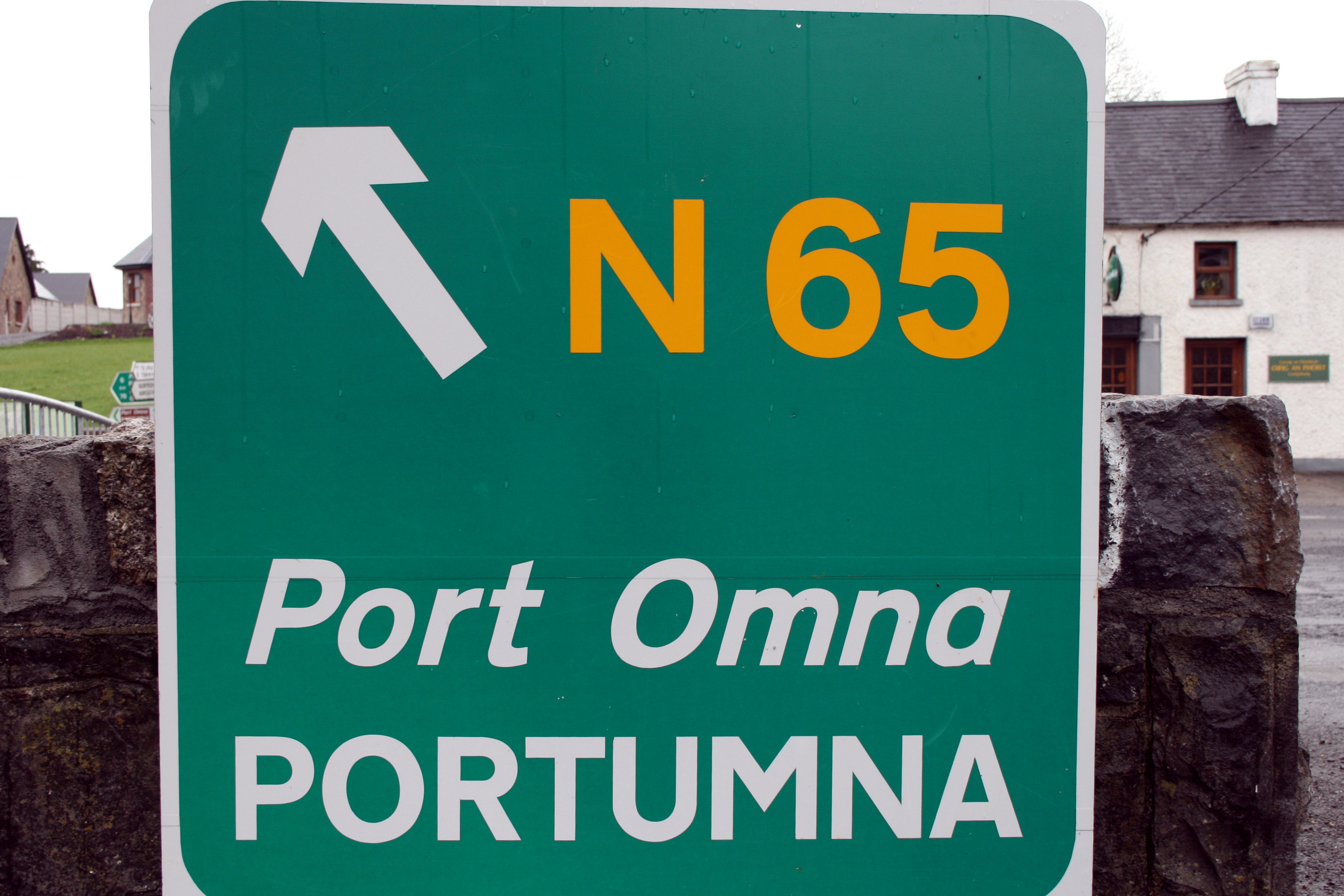
- N65 at Carrigahorig, County Tipperary

Route information
- Length: 52.517 km (32.633 mi)

Location
- Country: Ireland
- Primary destinations: County Tipperary; Borrisokane, leaves N52; Carrigahorig - (R493); (R489); Crosses the River Shannon; County Galway; Portumna - (R355); (R352); Killimore - (R356); Drumatober; Ballydavid, County Galway; Terminates at the M6 10 km (6.2 mi) north of Loughrea

Highway system
- Roads in Ireland; Motorways; Primary; Secondary; Regional

The N65 road is a national secondary road in Ireland. It links the N52 at Borrisokane, County Tipperary to the M6 north of Loughrea in County Galway.

En route it crosses the Portumna bridge over the River Shannon. The road is 52.517 km (32.633 mi) long.

== See also ==
- Roads in Ireland
- Motorways in Ireland
- National primary road
- Regional road
