= N52 road (Ireland) =

Road in Ireland

N52 road
- Bóthar N52
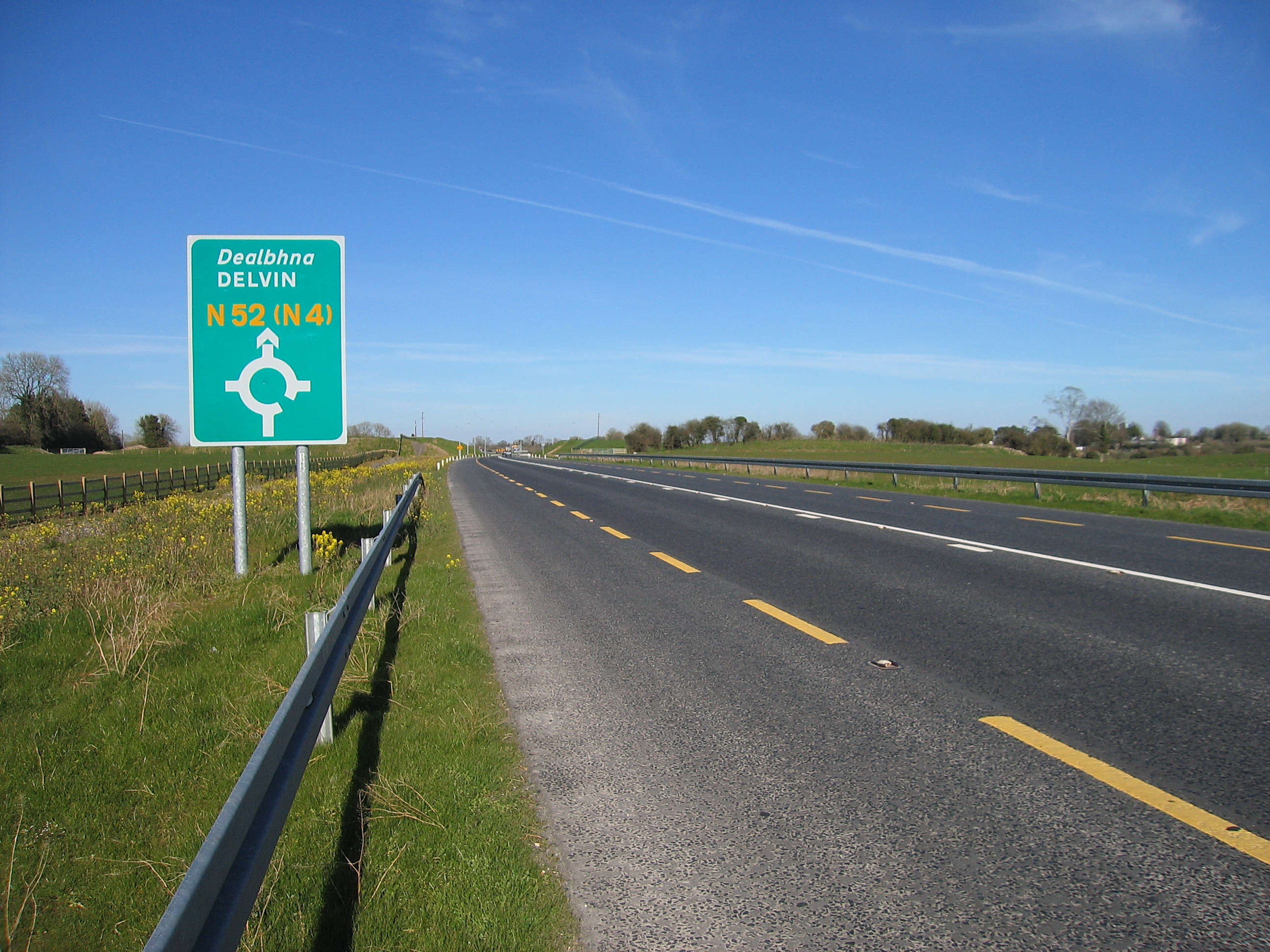
- N52 Mullingar bypass

Route information
- Length: 177.694 km (110.414 mi)

Location
- Country: Ireland
- Primary destinations: (bypassed routes in italics): County Tipperary; South of Nenagh, leaves M7; Nenagh bypass (R494, R495); Crosses the Nenagh River; (R493); Ardcroney; Borrisokane (N65, R490) - crosses the Ballyfinboy River; Ballingarry; Carrig; Riverstown - crosses the Little Brosna River; (R489); County Offaly; Birr joined by N62 (R439, R440); Kennedy's Cross Roads; N62 leaves; Fivealley; Kilcormac - (R437), crosses the Silver River; Blue Ball (R357); (R421); Tullamore bypass (R421) (R443) (N80), (R420) (R443); Crosses the Grand Canal; County Westmeath; Kilbeggan joins the M6; Tyrrellspass leaves the M6; Dalystown - N52 is the minor road at junction with a local road; Mullingar (bypassed) joins/leaves N4; Delvin (N51, R395); Clonmellon; County Meath; (R154); Kells bypass (N3, R164, R163); Carlanstown; Joins/leaves the R162 at a staggered junction; (R165); County Louth; Ardee join N2, (N33), leave N2; (R166); (M1); Dundalk (R132, R172, R934); Terminates north of Dundalk at junction with M1, N1 and R173

Highway system
- Roads in Ireland; Motorways; Primary; Secondary; Regional

The N52 road is a national secondary road in Ireland. It links the M7 motorway from just south of Nenagh, County Tipperary to the M1 motorway north of Dundalk in County Louth. The route forms a connection between the north east of Ireland and the mid west traversing the midlands. It interchanges with the M6 at Kilbeggan and at Tyrrellspass, the N4 at Mullingar, the N3 at Kells, and the N2 at Ardee before continuing towards Dundalk.

The road is 177.694 km (110.414 mi) long.

== Quality of Road ==
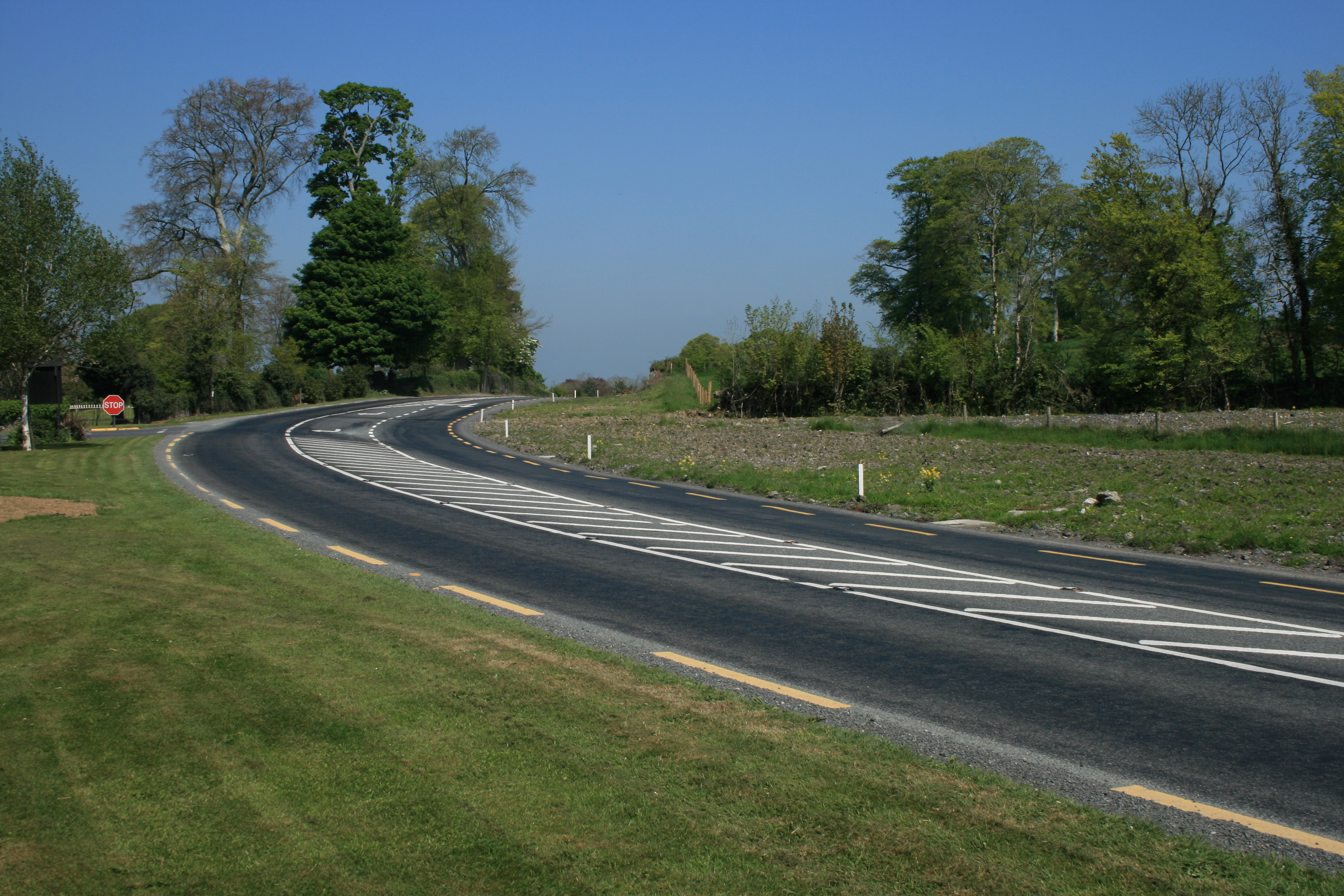
N52 south of Mullingar - bypassed in 2007

The road is mainly single carriageway two-lane throughout. It has some upgraded sections, but generally the standard is poor or very poor. It starts (from the southwest) at a grade separated junction with the M7 motorway and bypasses Nenagh on its western side as single carriageway. Past Nenagh, it is generally a single carriageway road with no hard shoulders all the way to Birr. Many sections of this part of the route are very poor through County Tipperary with sharp bends. The route from Birr to Tullamore was upgraded in recent years and has good alignment, hard shoulders and a good surface as has the section from Tullamore to Kilbeggan which was upgraded in the 1970s. At Tullamore the route forms a bypass of Mucklagh and Tullamore.

The road forms an interchange on the M6 motorway south of Kilbeggan and follows it eastwards to the Tyrrellspass exit. (Prior to the opening of the M6 the route went through Kilbeggan town and went past the racecourse via Ballinagore). From the Tyrrellspass junction it heads north to Mullingar as the Tyrrellspass eastern bypass and the eastern bypass of Mullingar (opened May 2007). It briefly joins the N4 dual-carriageway just outside Mullingar before leaving to head 5 kilometres east over what was once a notoriously dangerous road to Cloughan, which has since been upgraded. Past Cloughan the route continues on a very poor road to Delvin and Clonmellon. The poor road quality continues to Kells, where it meets the N3 to Cavan, and Ardee, where it meets the N2 to Derry, before reaching the M1 south of Dundalk. Prior to 2009, the Mullingar to Delvin stretch was an extremely dangerous road, and as of 2024, all of it has been upgraded to Type 1 single carriageway road, with the old road used for local access only. Two kilometers of dual-carriageway take it to the R132 (the old N1) from where it becomes the Dundalk eastern inner relief route, over a bridge near the harbour and north to the N1.

== Tullamore bypass ==
The Tullamore bypass is a 14 km (8.7 mi) single carriageway upgrade to the N52. The route leaves the existing N52 approximately 6 km (3.7 mi) southwest of Tullamore town, intersecting with the N80 road, crossing over the Grand Canal, before rejoining the N52 again 3 km (1.9 mi) north of the town. The scheme began construction in April 2008, and was completed in October 2009.

Four metal figures by sculptor Maurice Harron are located where the roadway cuts through esker ridges. The figures represent symbols of learning and sanctity. Approaching from the north the 1st figure holds up a chalice, the 2nd a book, the 3rd a crosier and the 4th shows the release of a flock of birds representing souls. The installation was funded by the percentage for arts scheme where 1% of the budget is allocated to roadside art.

== Lack of priority ==
- At the N52 junction with the R162 in County Meath the N52 stops and joins the R162 regional road and then leaves it again 100m further south. At this junction the regional road is the main road and is of a higher quality than the National route which crosses it.

== See also ==
- Roads in Ireland
- National primary road
- Motorways in Ireland
- Regional road
