= Charles P. Head =

Mississippi state legislator

Charles P. Head was a state legislator in Mississippi. He represented Warren County, Mississippi, in the Mississippi House of Representatives in 1870 and 1871. An African American, he belonged to the Republican Party.

In October 1864, Head represented Mississippi at the National Convention of Colored Men in Syracuse, New York, where he was elected vice president.
