= Charles Octavius Head =

Irish colonel in the British Army and author

Charles Octavius Head DSO
- Head in 1917
- Born: 30 May 1869; Derrylahan Park, Rathcabbin, County Tipperary
- Died: 16 October 1952 (aged 83)
- Burial place: Cruckton, Shropshire
- Military career
- Allegiance: United Kingdom
- Branch: British Army
- Service years: 1887–1910; 1914–1918
- Rank: Lt. Colonel
- Units: 141st Battery of Horse Artillery / 29th Brigade, 4th Division
- Conflicts: First World War
- Awards: DSO

Lieutenant–Colonel Charles Octavius Head, DSO (30 May 1869 – 16 October 1952) was an Irish colonel in the British Army, and author of four books including his autobiography, No Great Shakes. His mansion, Derrylahan, was burned during the Irish War of Independence. Head later moved his family to Hinton Hall, Pontesbury in Shropshire. His home near Pontesbury was also destroyed by fire, this time accidentally, when much of his library was incinerated, making his written works rare.

== Early life and family ==
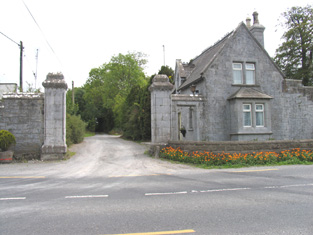
The gate house at Derrylahan

Charles Octavius Head was born on 30 May 1869 at Derrylahan Park, Walshpark, Rathcabbin, County Tipperary, the eighth of eleven children of William Henry Head (1809–1888) and his wife, Isabella Biddulph (1840–1911). Both of his parents were born into Anglo-Irish Protestant landowning families long resident in the Irish Midlands. He had three brothers, William Edward, John Henry, and Michael Ravenscroft, and four surviving sisters, Elizabeth, Georgiana, Isabella, and Anna. He attended boarding school in Bray, County Wicklow before enrolling in the Royal Military Academy in Woolwich, London in 1885. An accomplished horseman, he won the academy's Riding Cup, graduated in 1887, and joined the Royal Horse Artillery.

Head married Alice Margaret Threlfall of Tilstone Lodge, Tarporley, in Cheshire in 1908, they had three children, Elizabeth, Isabel Grace, and Michael.

== Military career ==
Head was commissioned a lieutenant on 23 July 1890, and promoted to captain on 22 November 1897. He served in India, China (in the aftermath of the Boxer Rebellion), and South Africa (as the Second Boer War was winding down). Promotion to major followed on 7 November 1902. He returned to Ireland in 1905 and was assigned to the 141st Battery of the Royal Horse Artillery at Cahir, County Tipperary. His final assignment was the command of B Battery, RHA, in India. He initially retired from the Army in 1910 but was called back into service in 1914 after the commencement of WWI where he fought in numerous important battles including the Battle of the Somme and the Battle of Passchendaele, commanding the 29th Brigade, 4th Division. Head retired for good after WWI ended. He was awarded the China Medal for his service and the Distinguished Service Order with bar in the 1917 New Year Honours list.

== Later life ==
After he retired from the army at the end of WWI, he settled into a life of farming back home at Derrylahan. He farmed the substantial estate, which was a mixture of good pasture, woodlands, and bog. The house was built by his father in 1862 at the cost of £15,000 and was designed by the famous architect Thomas Newenham Deane. In Tipperary, he served as the local justice of the peace.

The War of Independence in Ireland, which began in 1919, threatened the stability of the Anglo-Irish families such as the Heads. The house at Derrylahan was burned by the Irish Republican Army (IRA) during the night of 1–2 July 1921. Head moved his family to England and settled at Hinton Hall in Shropshire. While in England he wrote four books, his autobiography No Great Shakes (1943), and three military books, The Art of Generalship: Four Exponents and One Example (1929), A Glance at Gallipoli (1931) and Napoleon and Wellington (1939). His 1929 book, The Art of Generalship, included an overview of the Duke of Wellington's military career, and draws comparisons between the Battle of Salamanca and generalship in WWI.

Charles' interest in Wellington was personal since his grandfather, Lt. Col., later Lt. Gen., Michael Head, commanded the 13th Light Dragoons (1810–1813) during the Peninsular War as part of Wellington's army against Napoleon's forces. His account of his experiences in the Somme have been used to reassess elements of the British campaign and tactics in comparison to the French. In A Glance at Gallipoli, Head was seen to reopen and critically examine the controversy regarding the military tactics employed in the Battle of Gallipoli. In 1950, an accidental fire at Hinton Hall destroyed most of his personal papers and printed materials, including his own books.

== Legacy ==
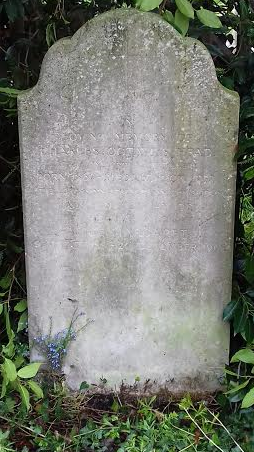
The final resting place of Head and his wife at Cruckton, Shropshire

Head's son, Brigadier Michael Head CBE, was a successful amateur race car driver in his own Jaguar sports cars. Michael's son is Sir Patrick Head, co-founder with the late Sir Frank Williams and former technical director of Williams Grand Prix Engineering. Michael's daughter, Sara Day, is an author whose nonfiction works include Coded Letters, Concealed Love: The Larger Lives of Harriet Freeman and Edward Everett Hale and a history of the Head family in Ireland, Not Irish Enough: An Anglo-Irish Family's Three Centuries in Ireland. This book expands on her grandfather's autobiography by tracing the Heads from their arrival in Ireland until the atrocity that caused the departure of the last landowning branch of the once numerous family in N. Tipperary.
