= R355 road (Ireland) =

Road in Ireland

R355 road
- Bóthar R355
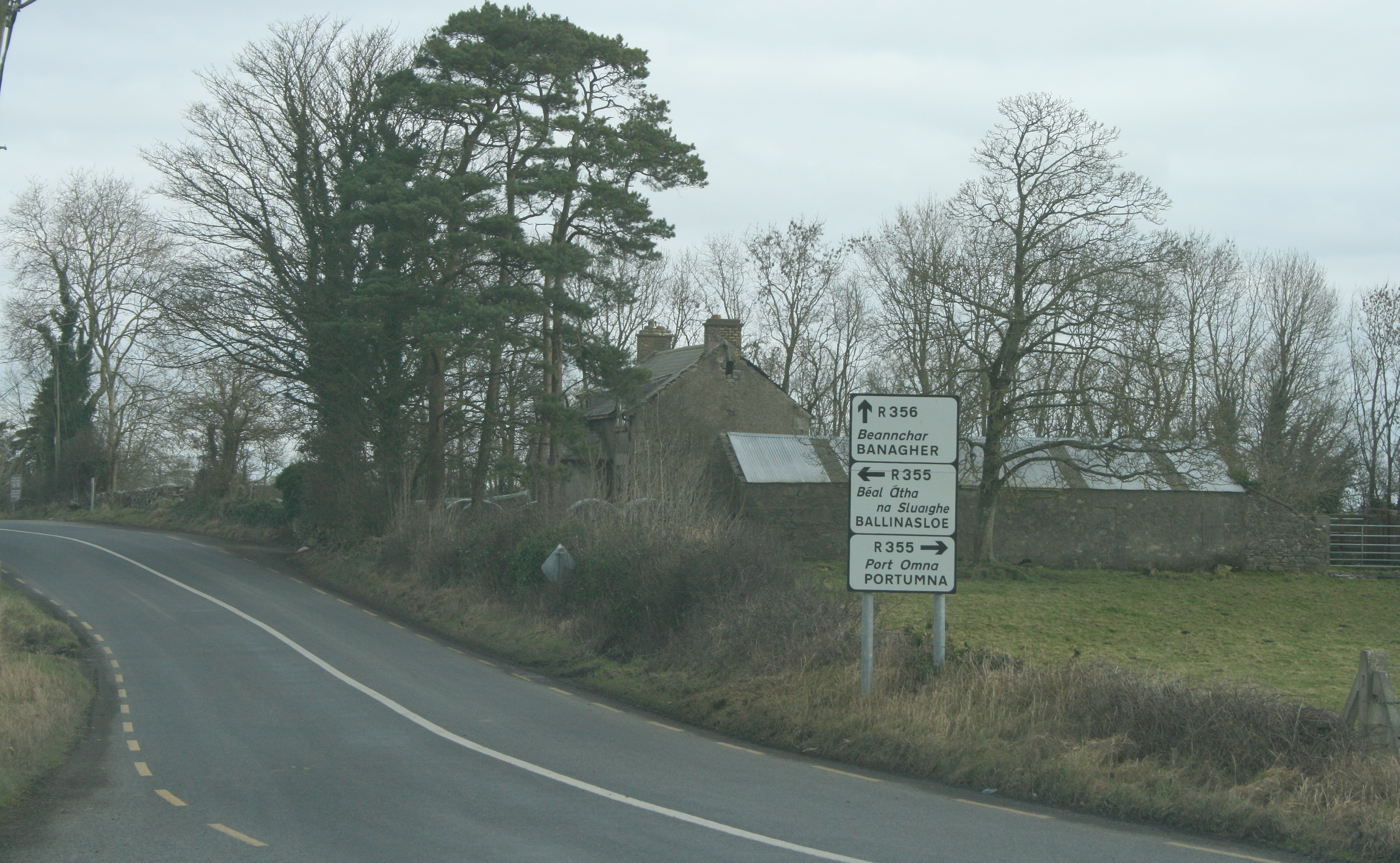
- R355 at staggered junction with the R356

Route information
- Length: 32 km (20 mi)

Location
- Country: Ireland
- Primary destinations: County Galway; Ballinasloe – leave the R446; Oghill; Laurencetown; (R356); Portumna terminates at N65

Highway system
- Roads in Ireland; Motorways; Primary; Secondary; Regional

The R355 road is a regional road in Ireland linking Ballinasloe to Portumna, all in County Galway. The road is 32 km (20 mi) long.

== See also ==
- Roads in Ireland
- National primary road
- National secondary road
