= Riverstown (near Birr) =

Village in Offaly/Tipperary, Ireland

Riverstown Baile Uí Lachnáin
- Village
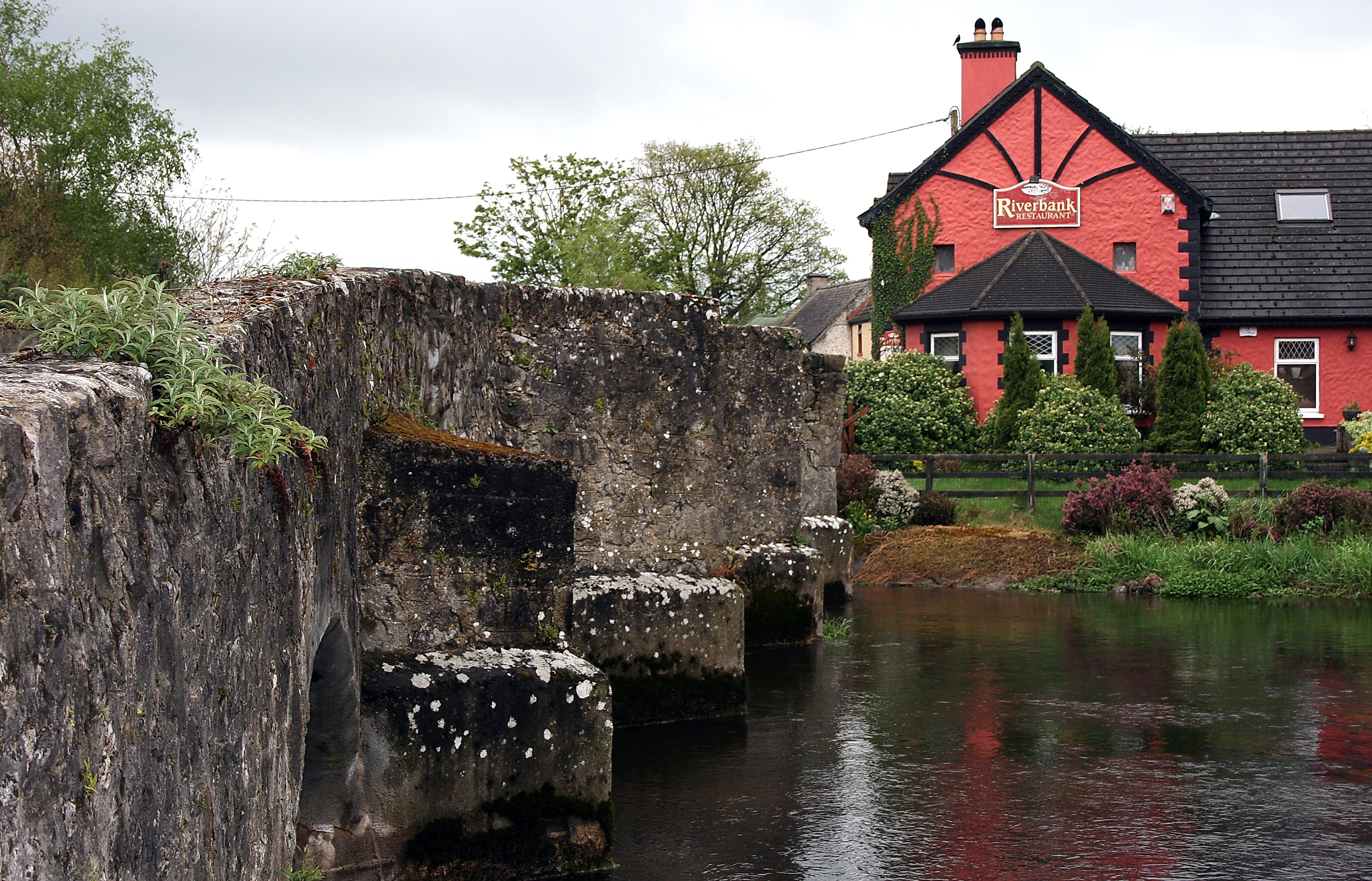
- The bridge at Riverstown on the Little Brosna

- Location in Ireland
- Coordinates: 53°04′58″N 7°55′27″W
- Country: Ireland
- Province: Munster
- County: County Tipperary
- Time zone: UTC+0 (WET)
  - Summer (DST): UTC-1 (IST (WEST))

Riverstown (Irish: Baile Uí Lachnáin, meaning 'town of O'Loughnin') is a small village straddling the border between Counties Tipperary and Offaly on the outskirts of Birr in Ireland. It is mostly within the townland of Ballyloughnane, on the Tipperary side of the river.

Riverstown lies at the point where the N52 road crosses the Little Brosna River, a tributary of the River Shannon, by a 300-year-old five-arch bridge, the Little Brosna here forming the border between the two counties. The bridge was described in the Civil Survey of 1654-6 as the 'old bridge of Beallanadarragh'.

== Buildings of note ==
Castle View House (1810–30) is a detached two-storey over basement home with three bays. It is listed on the National Inventory of Architectural Heritage as being of architectural interest.

A terrace of eight two-storey mill worker houses was built around 1800 to accommodate workers from Riverstown flour mill. This is presently configured as four homes.

Rivertown House is a detached two-storey house dating from c. 1775. It retains many of its original features, lime render, small-pane sash windows and cut-stone door surround. It is listed as being protected by Tipperary County Council (ref S335).

Riverstown Bridge is listed as being protected by Tipperary County Council (ref S336).

The road bridge (built c. 1820) which carries the N52 over the long disused Birr to Portumna railway line is listed on the National Inventory of Architectural Heritage as being of Architectural Historical Social and Technical interest.

The Farmleigh residential development in Riverstown has been classified as an unfinished estate and is therefore exempt from the household charge.

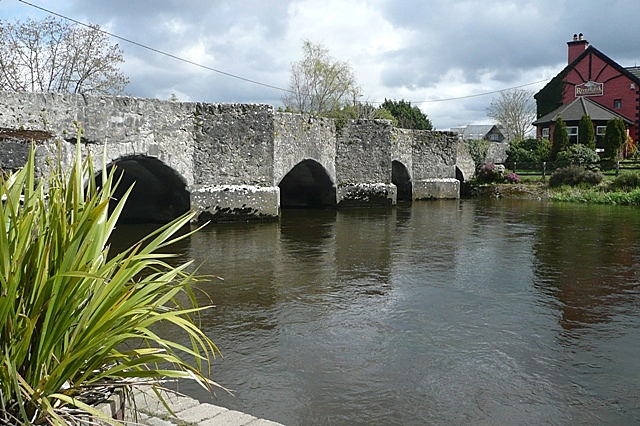
Bridge in 2009

== Fishery ==
Fishing is possible on the Little Brosna River upstream of the bridge at Riverstown for 9 km as far as Sharavogue,

== Notable people ==
- Thomas Hackett, recipient of the Victoria Cross

== See also ==
- List of towns and villages in Ireland
