= List of bridges in the Republic of Ireland =

This list of bridges in the Republic of Ireland lists bridges of particular historical, scenic, architectural or engineering interest. Road and railway bridges, viaducts, aqueducts and footbridges are included.

== Historical and architectural interest bridges ==
| | Name | Irish | Distinction | Length | Type | Carries Crosses | Opened | Location | County | Ref. |
|---|---|---|---|---|---|---|---|---|---|---|
| 1 | King John's Bridge | Droichead Eoin Shasana | Reputed to be Ireland's oldest surviving bridge | | Masonry; 1 semi-circular arch | Griffeen River | 1199 to 1216 | Griffeen Valley Park, Lucan; 53°20′55.2″N 6°26′21.3″W | South Dublin | |
| 2 | Old Weir Bridge | | Killarney National Park | | Masonry; 3 semi-circular arches | Lakes of Killarney | 16th century | Killarney; 52°00′27.2″N 9°32′58.1″W | Kerry | |
| 3 | Green's Bridge | | Architectural Heritage | | Masonry; 5 elliptical arches, limestone | Road bridge River Nore | 1766 | Kilkenny; 52°39′28.9″N 7°15′13.2″W | Kilkenny | |
| 4 | Brickeen Bridge | | Killarney National Park | | Masonry; 1 pointed arch | Lakes of Killarney | 18th century | Killarney; 52°00′54.7″N 9°32′50.7″W | Kerry | |
| 5 | Lucan Bridge | Droichead Leamhcáin | Largest single span masonry bridge in Ireland; Span : 34 m (112 ft) | | Masonry; 1 segmental arch | Road bridge River Liffey | 1814 | Lucan; 53°21′36.0″N 6°26′46.4″W | South Dublin | |
| 6 | Ha'penny Bridge | Droichead na Life | First cast iron bridge over the Liffey in Dublin; Architectural Heritage | 43 m (141 ft) | Arch; Cast iron arch, wooden deck | Footbridge; River Liffey | 1816 | Dublin; 53°20′46.8″N 6°15′47.2″W | County Dublin | |
| 7 | Seán Heuston Bridge | Droichead Seán Heuston | | 30 m (98 ft) | Arch; Cast iron deck arch | Luas (Red Line); River Liffey | 1828 | Dublin; 53°20′50.7″N 6°17′30.6″W | County Dublin | |
| 8 | Boyne Viaduct | Tarbhealach na Bóinne | Architectural Heritage | 540 m (1,770 ft) | Truss; Iron, masonry piers | Belfast–Dublin line River Boyne | 1855 | Drogheda; 53°43′00.1″N 6°20′14.8″W | Louth | |
| 9 | Rory O'More Bridge | Droichead Ruaraí Uí Mhóra | | 29 m (95 ft) | Arch; Cast iron deck arch | Road bridge River Liffey | 1859 | Dublin; 53°20′48.3″N 6°17′02.5″W | County Dublin | |
| 10 | James Joyce Bridge | Droichead James Joyce | Designed by Santiago Calatrava | 40 m (130 ft) | Arch; Steel tied arch Bow-string bridge | Road bridge River Liffey | 2003 | Dublin; 53°20′47.9″N 6°16′57.3″W | County Dublin | |
| 11 | Seán O'Casey Bridge | Droichead Sheáin Uí Chathasaigh | IStructE Award for Pedestrian Bridges 2006 | 100 m (330 ft) | Cable-stayed; Steel deck and pylons Swing bridge | Footbridge; River Liffey | 2005 | Dublin; 53°20′50.6″N 6°14′52.8″W | County Dublin | |
| 12 | Lacy Bridge | | | | Arch; Steel tied arch | Footbridge; River Boyne | 2005 | Drogheda; 53°42′50.7″N 6°20′50.5″W | Louth | |
| 13 | Samuel Beckett Bridge | Droichead Samuel Beckett | | 123 m (404 ft) | Cable-stayed; Steel box girder deck, steel pylon Swing bridge 95+28 | Road bridge River Liffey | 2009 | Dublin; 53°20′49.1″N 6°14′28.8″W | County Dublin | |

== Major road and railway bridges ==
This table presents the structures with spans greater than 100 meters (non-exhaustive list).

| | Name | Irish | Span | Length | Type | Carries Crosses | Opened | Location | County | Ref. |
|---|---|---|---|---|---|---|---|---|---|---|
| 1 | River Suir Bridge | | 230 m (750 ft) | 465 m (1,526 ft) | Cable-stayed; Composite steel/concrete deck, concrete pylon 230+91+66+42 | N25 road (Waterford Bypass); River Suir | 2009 | Waterford; 52°16′44.7″N 7°09′01.2″W | Waterford; Kilkenny | |
| 2 | Rose Fitzgerald Kennedy Bridge | | 230 m (750 ft)(x2) | 887 m (2,910 ft) | Extradosed; Concrete box girder deck, 3 concrete pylons 95+2x230+95 | N25 road (New Ross Bypass); River Barrow | 2020 | New Ross–Glenmore; 52°21′23.9″N 6°59′36.5″W | Wexford; Kilkenny | |
| 3 | Mary McAleese Boyne Valley Bridge | | 170 m (560 ft) | 352 m (1,155 ft) | Cable-stayed; Composite steel/concrete deck, concrete pylon 170+42 | M1 motorway River Boyne | 2003 | Drogheda; 53°43′07.1″N 6°23′48.8″W | Louth; Meath | |
| 4 | William Dargan Bridge | | 108 m (354 ft) | 185 | Cable-stayed; Composite steel/concrete deck, concrete pylon 108+21 | Luas (Green Line); River Slang; R112–R117 roads | 2004 | Dundrum; 53°17′35.3″N 6°14′45.9″W | Dún Laoghaire–Rathdown | |

== List of bridges in Dublin ==
| Name | Locality | Date | Notes |
|---|---|---|---|
| Anna Livia Bridge | Chapelizod | 1753 | Spans the River Liffey |
| Annesley Bridge | Fairview | 1926 | Spans the River Tolka |
| Ball's Bridge | Ballsbridge | 1791 | Spans the River Dodder |
| Broom Bridge | Cabra | | Crosses the Royal Canal |
| Butt Bridge | | 1932 | Spans the River Liffey |
| Classon's Bridge | Milltown and Dartry | 1790s | Spans the River Dodder |
| Clonskeagh Bridge | Clonskeagh | | Spans the River Dodder |
| Dublinia Arch | Dublinia | | Connects Dublinia and Christ Church Cathedral |
| East-Link | North Wall (Dublin) and Ringsend | 1984 | Officially the Tom Clarke Bridge Spans the River Liffey |
| Farmleigh Bridge | Strawberry Beds | 1870s | Spans the River Liffey |
| Father Mathew Bridge | | 1816 | Spans the River Liffey |
| Frank Sherwin Bridge | | 1982 | Spans the River Liffey |
| Grattan Bridge | | 1750s | Spans the River Liffey |
| Ha'penny Bridge | | 1816 | Cast-iron footbridge over the River Liffey |
| Islandbridge | Phoenix Park | 1793 | Spans the River Liffey |
| James Joyce Bridge | | 2003 | Spans the River Liffey |
| Liffey Railway Bridge | Heuston | 1877 | Wrought iron Box truss railway bridge over the River Liffey |
| London Bridge | | 1857 | Spans the River Dodder |
| Loopline Bridge | | 1891 | Wrought iron railway bridge over the River Liffey |
| Mellows Bridge | | 1764 | Spans the River Liffey |
| Millennium Bridge | | 1999 | Steel pedestrian bridge over the River Liffey |
| Milltown Bridge | Milltown | | Spans the River Dodder |
| New Bridge | | | Spans the River Dodder |
| Nine Arches Bridge | Milltown | 1859 | Light Rail bridge over the River Dodder |
| O'Connell Bridge | | 1794 | Spans the River Liffey |
| O'Donovan Rossa Bridge | | 1818 | Spans the River Liffey |
| Ringsend Bridge | | 1812 | Spans the River Dodder |
| Rory O'More Bridge | | 1859 | Iron bridge over the River Liffey |
| Rosie Hackett Bridge | | 2014 | Concrete bridge over the River Liffey |
| Samuel Beckett Bridge | Docklands | 2009 | Cable stayed bridge over the River Liffey |
| Seán Heuston Bridge | | 1828 | Cast iron bridge over the River Liffey |
| Seán O'Casey Bridge | | 2005 | Pedestrian swingbridge over the River Liffey |
| Talbot Memorial Bridge | | 1978 | Spans the River Liffey |
| William Dargan Bridge | Dundrum | 2004 | Cable stayed Light Rail bridge over the R112 and R117 roads and the River Slang |

== List of bridges in the rest of Ireland ==
| Name | County | Locality | Date | Notes |
|---|---|---|---|---|
| Athlone Railway Bridge | County Westmeath | Athlone | 1851 | Railway bridge across the River Shannon |
| Ballinadihy Bridge | County Cork | Aghabullogue | | Stone bridge crossing the Delehinagh River |
| Banagher bridge | County Offaly and County Galway | Banagher | 1843 | Crosses the River Shannon |
| Barrow Bridge | County Kilkenny and County Wexford | Cheekpoint | 1906 | Disused railway bridge across the River Barrow |
| Boyne Viaduct | County Louth | Drogheda | 1855 | Railway bridge over the River Boyne |
| Broadmeadow viaduct | Fingal | Malahide | 1930s | Carries the Dublin-Belfast railway line across the Broadmeadow estuary |
| Carrick Bridge | County Leitrim and County Roscommon | Carrick-on-Shannon | 1846 | crosses the River Shannon |
| Colthurst's Bridge | County Cork | Coachford | | Stone bridge crossing the Delehinagh River |
| Dripsey Castle Bridge | County Cork | Dripsey | | Stone bridge crossing the Delehinagh River |
| Farmleigh Bridge | County Dublin | Strawberry Beds | 1850s | Disused steel box truss bridge over the River Liffey |
| Finn Bridge | County Monaghan and County Fermanagh (NI) | Scotshouse | 1860s | Spans the River Finn between the Republic and Northern Ireland. |
| The Joe Dolan Memorial Bridge | County Westmeath | Mullingar, County Westmeath | 2010 | 540m long bridge that crosses the floodplain of the River Brosna and Lacy's Canal in Mullingar. |
| Killaloe Bridge | County Clare and County Tipperary | Killaloe and Ballina | C18 | Spans the River Shannon |
| Laune Viaduct | County Kerry | Killorglin | 1885 | Former railway bridge which carried the Great Southern and Western Railway over the River Laune |
| Leader's Aqueduct | County Cork | Aghabullogue | c.1860 | Ruined. Carried water for irrigation over the Dripsey River |
| Lifford Bridge | County Donegal and County Tyrone (NI) | Lifford | 1964 | Spans the River Foyle between the Republic and Northern Ireland |
| The Living Bridge | County Limerick and County Clare | University of Limerick | 2007 | Pedestrian footbridge across the River Shannon |
| Lucan Bridge | County Dublin | Lucan | 1814 | Spans the River Liffey |
| Luskin's Bridge | County Cork | Coachford | | Stone bridge crossing the River Dripsey |
| Mary McAleese Boyne Valley Bridge | County Meath & County Louth | Drogheda | 2003 | Carries the M1 motorway over the River Boyne |
| Mary O'Rourke Bridge | County Westmeath | Athlone | 2023 | Trailhead for Dublin-Galway greenway crossing the Shannon |
| Michael Davitt Bridge | County Mayo | Achill Island | 1887 | Swing bridge linking the Corraun Peninsula to Achill Island |
| Mullen Bridge | County Kildare | Maynooth | c.1800 | Spans the Royal Canal |
| Old Weir Bridge | County Kerry | Lakes of Killarney | C16 | At the "Meeting of the Waters" |
| Portumna bridge | County Galway | Portumna | 1911 | Carries N65 across the River Shannon |
| Quiet Man Bridge (Leam Bridge) | County Galway | Oughterard | | Crosses the River Owenriff |
| Rice Bridge | County Waterford | Waterford | 1986 | Spans the River Suir |
| Rose Fitzgerald Kennedy Bridge | County Wexford and County Kilkenny | New Ross | 2020 | Spans the River Barrow |
| Seven Arches Bridge | County Mayo | Newport | c.1892 | Former railway bridge over the Newport River |
| Shannon Bridge | County Offaly and County Roscommon | Shannonbridge | 1757 | Crosses the River Shannon |
| West-Link | County Dublin | Blanchardstown | 1990 | Toll bridge over the River Liffey |
| Wexford bridge | County Wexford | Wexford | 1959 | Crosses the River Slaney |

== See also ==
- List of crossings of the River Liffey
- List of crossings of the Shannon

== Notes and references ==
- "Bridgesofdublin.ie". Dublin City Council.
- Nicolas Janberg. "International Database for Civil and Structural Engineering". Structurae.com.
- Others references

== See also ==
- List of Dublin bridges and tunnels
- Transport in the Republic of Ireland
- Roads in Ireland
- Rail transport in the Republic of Ireland
- Geography of the Republic of Ireland
