= The Three Sisters (Ireland) =

Three substantial rivers in southern Ireland

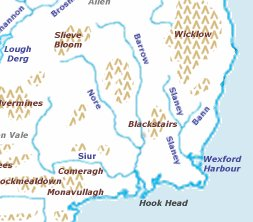
Map showing the Three Sisters river system

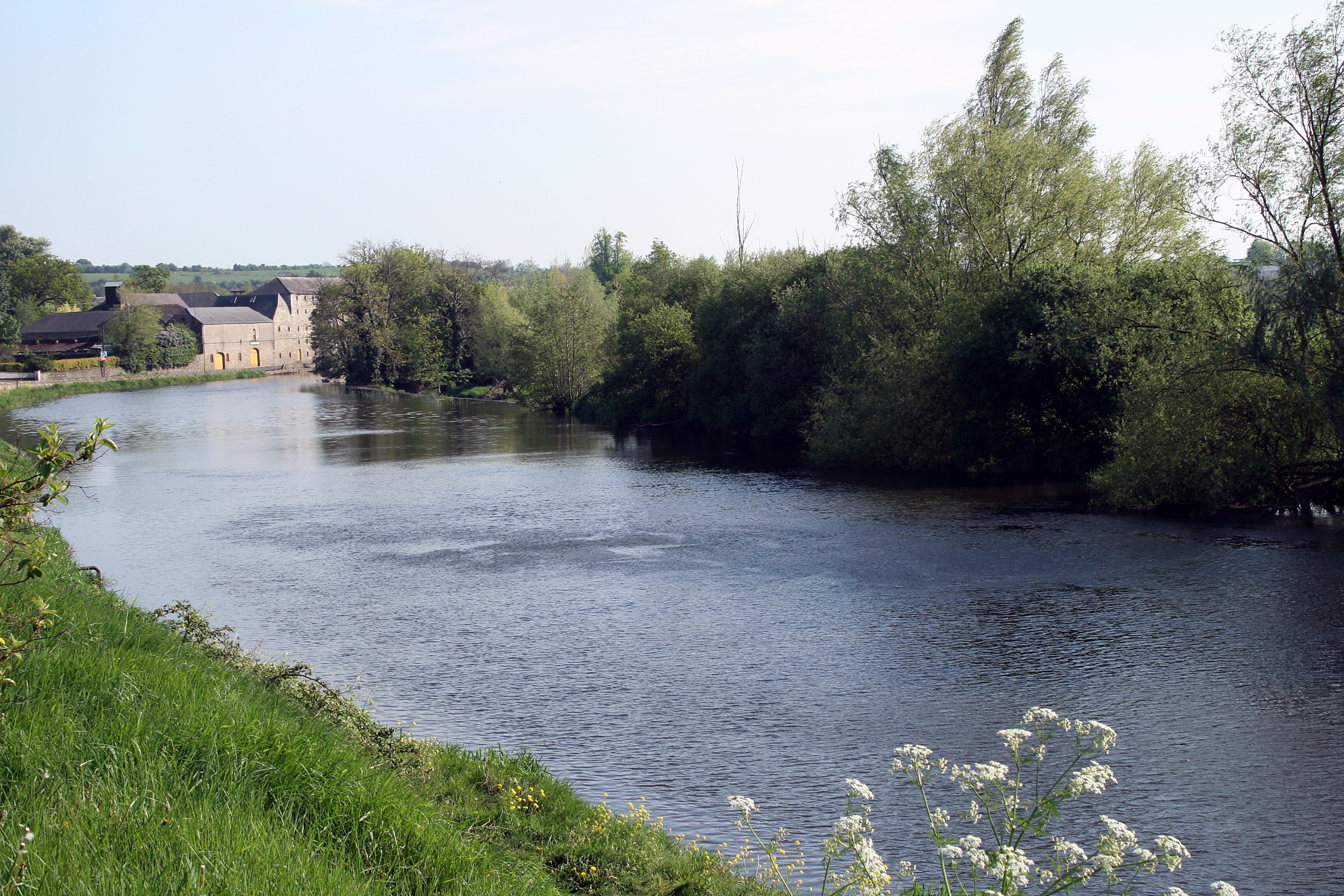
River Barrow near Bagenalstown, County Carlow

The Three Sisters (Irish: An Triúr Deirfiúr) are three rivers in Ireland: the River Barrow, the River Nore and the River Suir. The Suir and Nore rise in the same mountainous area in County Tipperary, near the Devil's Bit, while the Barrow rises in the Slieve Bloom Mountains in County Laois. The Nore flows into the Barrow about 17 km before the Suir and Barrow join to form the Waterford Harbour Estuary, which is east of Waterford city. The rivers fan out to drain a large portion of the southern part of the island, including Counties Tipperary, Carlow, Kilkenny, Wexford and Waterford, among others.

The lengths of the three rivers of the Three Sisters are the Barrow - 192 km (119 mi), the Suir - 185 km (115 mi) and the Nore - 140 km (87 mi).

The combined catchment area of the Three Sisters is 9,207 km^{2}, made up of the Suir's (3,610 km^{2}), the Barrow's (3,067 km^{2}) and the Nore's (2,530 km^{2}).

The combined long term average flow rate of the Three Sisters into Waterford Harbour is 157 m^{3}/s, almost half of which is made up of the Suir's (76.9 m^{3}/s), followed by the Nore's (42.9 m^{3}/s) and the Barrow's (37.4 m^{3}/s).

The Nore joins the Barrow some four kilometres north of New Ross. The Barrow is crossed by the Barrow Bridge just before it joins the River Suir near Cheekpoint. This place is known in Irish as Cumar na dTrí Uisce, "the confluence of the three waters".

In ancient times, the area bounded by the Suir and the Barrow formed the Kingdom of Ossory. This name is retained today for dioceses in both the Roman Catholic Church and the Church of Ireland.

The first, the gentle Shure that making way
By sweet Clonmell, adorns rich Waterford;
The next, the stubborne Newre, whose waters gray,
By faire Kilkenny and Rosseponte boord,
The third, the goodly Barow, which doth hoorde
Great heaps of Salmons in his deepe bosome:
All which long sundred, doe at last accord
To ioyne in one, ere to the sea they come,
So flowing all from one, all one at last become.

Excerpt from Edmund Spencer's Irish rivers . 1552-1559
