= River Nore =

River in southern Ireland, one of the Three Sisters

Coordinates: 52°25′N 6°57′W

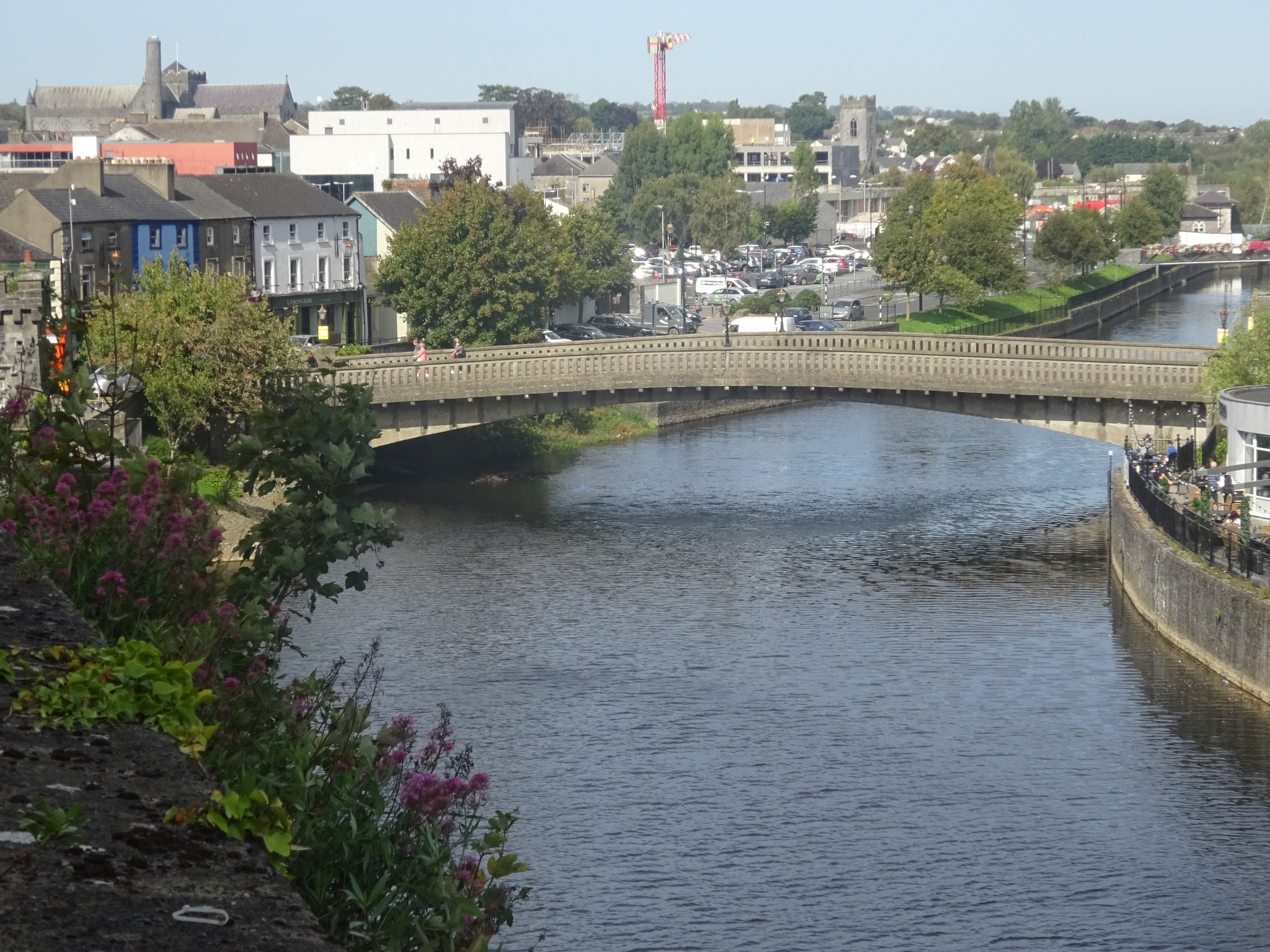
- Bridge over the Nore in Kilkenny

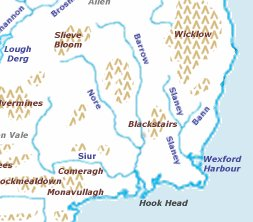
- Map of the Nore's course
- Etymology: Old Irish: Eoir
- Native name: An Fheoir (Irish)

Location
- State: Republic of Ireland
- Region: Leinster
- Counties: Tipperary, Laois, Kilkenny, Waterford

Physical characteristics
- Source: Devil's Bit Mountain
  - location: County Tipperary
- Mouth: River Barrow
  - location: New Ross, County Wexford
- Length: 140 km (87 mi)
- Basin size: 2,595 km^{2} (1,002 sq mi)
- Discharge
  - average: 42.9 m^{3}/s (1,510 cu ft/s)

Basin features
- River system: Three Sisters
- Tributaries
  - left: River Suir

The River Nore (Irish: An Fheoir [ə ˈn̠ʲoːɾʲ]) is one of the principal rivers (along with the River Suir and River Barrow) in the South-East Region of Ireland. The 140-kilometre-long (87 mi) river drains approximately 2,530 square kilometres (977 mi^{2}) of Leinster and Munster, that encompasses parts of three counties: Tipperary, Laois and Kilkenny. Along with the Suir and the Barrow, it is one of the Three Sisters group of rivers.

Starting in the Devil's Bit Mountain, County Tipperary, the river flows generally southeast, and then south, before its confluence with the River Barrow at Ringwood, and the Barrow railway bridge at Drumdowney, County Kilkenny, which empties into the Celtic Sea at Waterford Harbour.

The long term average flow rate of the River Nore is 42.9 cubic metres per second (m^{3}/s). The river is home to the only known extant population of the Nore freshwater pearl mussel, a critically endangered species. Much of the river's length is designated as a Special Area of Conservation.

== Name ==
Nore is an anglicisation of the river's Old Irish name An Eoir; the modern Irish name is An Fheoir. As such, the name is believed to be derived, etymologically, from Old Irish feórann: "green bank or shoreland." Modern Irish feora means "green band, edge or shore of sea, lake or river". In regard to "An Fheoir, the Nore (g. -e, al. An Eoir); al. Feor, cf. feora", Dinneen's Dictionary (1927) states: "Feoir g. -e, and Feorach, f. border, brim, edge; a stream or rivulet.”

The Martyrology of Oengus the Culdee (Félire Óengusso Céli Dé), written some time before the year 824, mentions the river: re taeb Eoire uarglaine "the cold-pure Eoire ." A Middle Irish reference, from before 1420, refers to the Fiond-chlár fairsing na Feoire "fair wide plain of the Feoir".

== Course ==
The Nore rises on the eastern slopes of the Devil's Bit Mountain in the townland of Borrisnoe, County Tipperary. It then flows south-eastwards to counties Laois and Kilkenny before joining the River Barrow just north of New Ross near the Barrow Bridge. The river passes near Durrow, County Laois then through Ballyragget, the city of Kilkenny and then the villages of Bennettsbridge and Thomastown, County Kilkenny. Further south, it forms a V-shaped river valley, particularly notable near the village of Inistioge, County Kilkenny, the tidal limit. Major tributaries of the Nore include the Dinan, the Breagagh at Kilkenny, the King's River, the Little Arrigle and the Black Water.

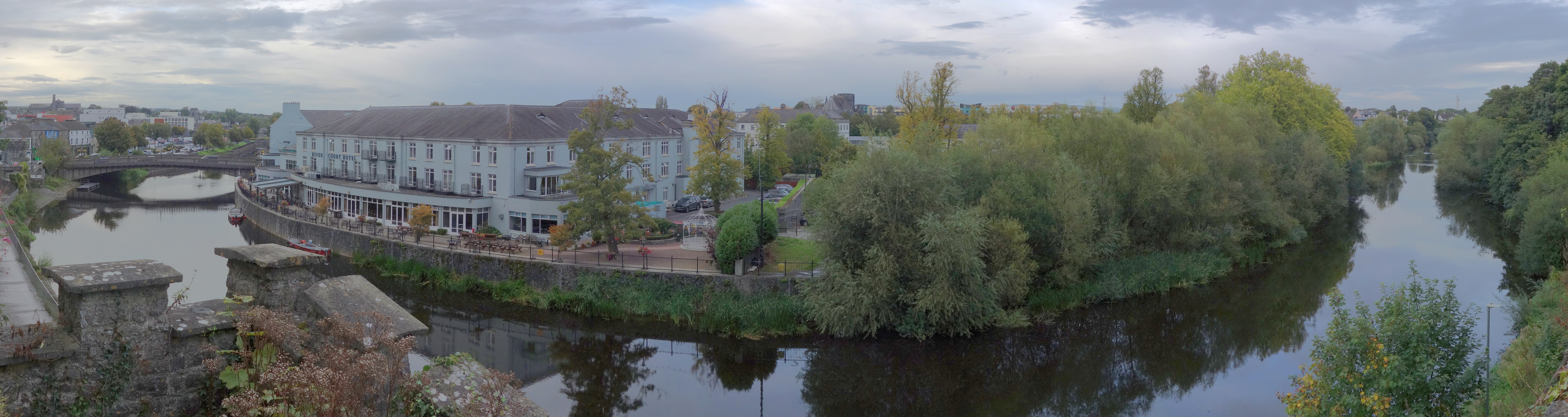
The Nore as seen from Kilkenny Castle

Some places along the river:

- Devil's Bit Mountain (begins)
- Castletown
- Durrow, County Laois (near)
- Ballyragget
- Kilkenny
- Bennettsbridge
- Thomastown
- Inistioge

Tributaries:

- River Erkina
- River Dinan
- White Horse (Mountrath River)
- Breagagh
- King's River
- Little Arrigle
- Black Water
- Clodiagh

== Geology and morphology ==
The Nore rises on a sandstone base but the catchment soon turns to limestone and remains so to the sea. The countryside is one of mixed farming, with some tillage, quite a bit of pasture and dairying and some bloodstock. The river has a fairly steep gradient but the flow is checked by innumerable weirs and it is probably true to say that shallow glides are the pre-dominant feature.

== History ==
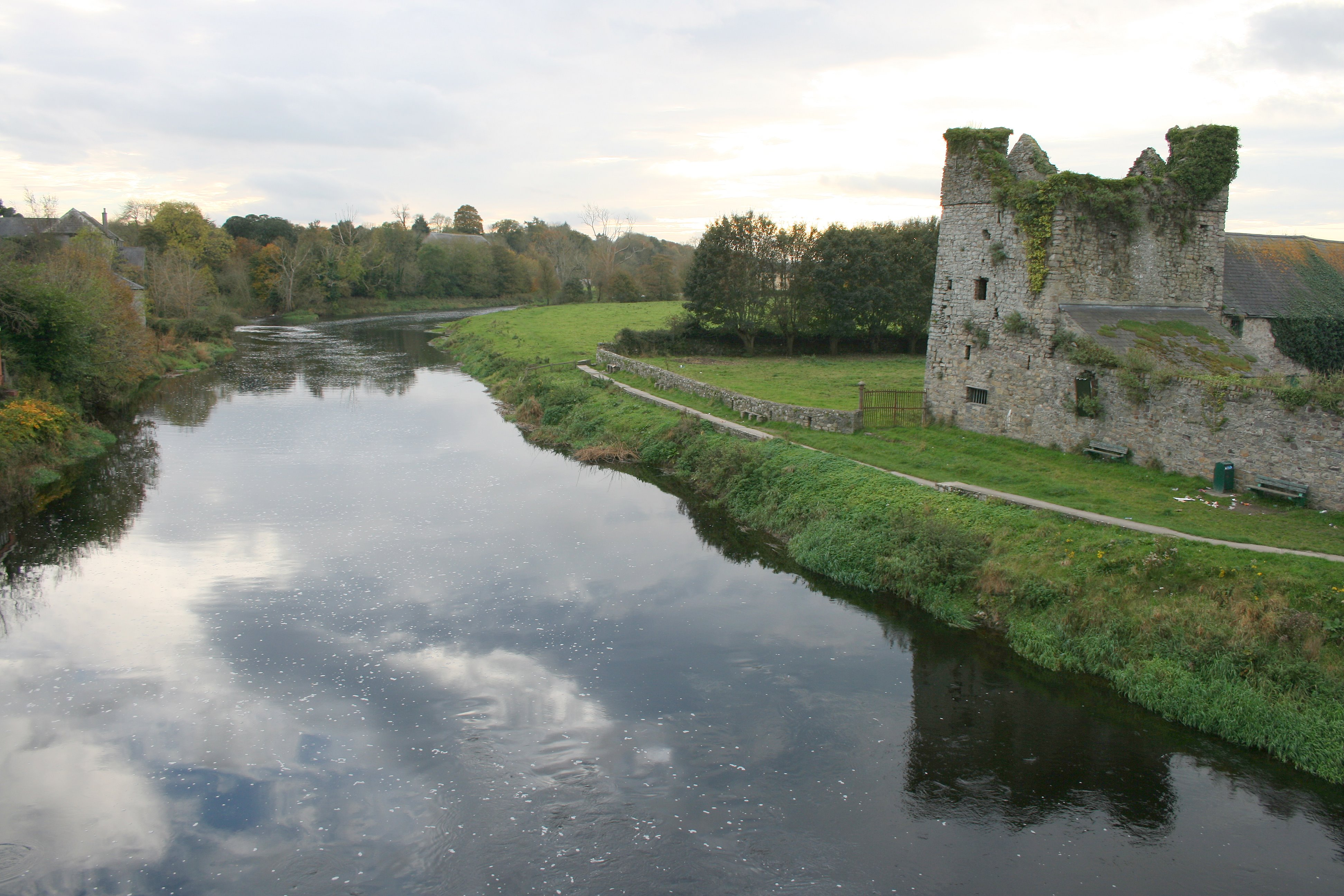
River Nore at Thomastown, County Kilkenny

In pre-Famine years, there were many water-powered industries in the Nore valley, particularly in the ten-mile (16 km) stretch between Kilkenny city and Thomastown, including breweries, woolen mills, sawmills, marble works, distilleries and grain mills. Flax and linen were produced just north of Kilkenny.

== Recreation ==
Kilkenny fishing club has extensive fishing rights on the River Nore and its tributary, the River Dinan. Popular with anglers, it holds brown trout and salmon.

Some of these weirs along the river have good playboating qualities. The river is long and mostly flat and dotted with weirs at most of the villages it passes through.

Salmon runs on the river Nore were interrupted in 2005 and 2006 by a flood relief scheme in Kilkenny city carried out by the Office of Public Works. Initially budgeted at €13.1 million, the scheme was delivered at a cost in excess of €48 million and did not contain suitable fish passes. This oversight has since been rectified at additional expense and salmon can now ascend the river upstream of Kilkenny city.

== See also ==
- Rivers of Ireland
- Three Sisters
  - River Suir
  - River Barrow
