= Faithlegg =

Civil parish and townland in County Waterford, Ireland

Coordinates: 52.26°N 7.02°W

Faithlegg (Irish: Fáithling) is a civil parish and townland in County Waterford, Ireland. The townland, which is 2.6 square kilometres (1.0 sq mi) in area, had a population of 372 as of the 2011 census. Faithlegg is on a promontory at the confluence of the River Suir and River Barrow, with the village of Cheekpoint lying on the northeast of the promontory.

== History ==
Evidence of ancient settlement in the area includes a number of ecclesiastical enclosure, holy well, tower house and motte sites.

The tower house (castle) at Faithlegg, historically associated with the Aylward family, was used as a defensive point during the Siege of Waterford in 1649. The castle and its lands were captured and granted to a Cromwellian soldier, William Bolton, before later coming into the ownership of the Power family. Faithlegg House, built on the estate in 1783, was expanded by the Power family in the late 19th-century. It is now a hotel.

Faithlegg's parish church, Saint Nicholas's Catholic Church, was built c. 1850 on the site of an earlier 13th-century Cistercian chapel. It is within the Catholic parish of Killea, Crooke and Faithlegg in the Diocese of Waterford and Lismore.

== Sport ==
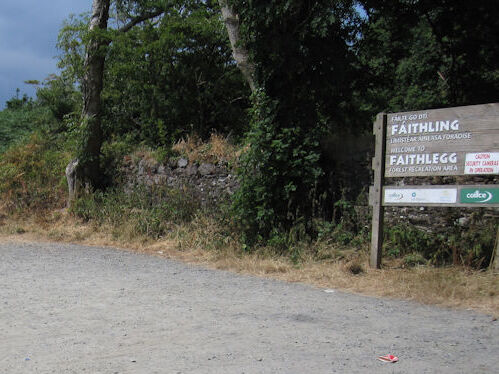
Coillte signage at Faithlegg woods

Faithlegg Golf Course hosted the Women's Irish Open in 2000 and 2001, and events in the PGA EuroPro Tour in 2007, 2008 and 2009.

== See also ==
- Cornelius Bolton (died 1829)
