= Barrow Bridge =

Railway bridge in southeast Ireland

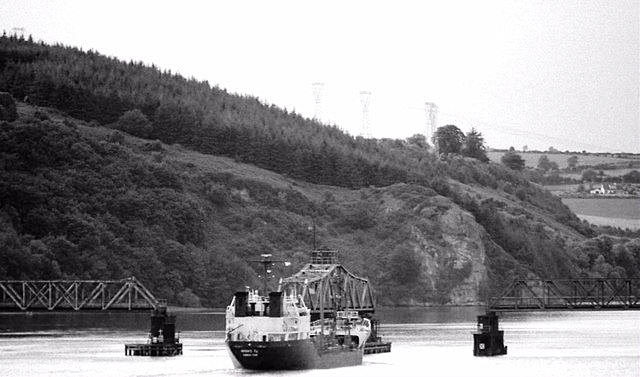
- A photo of Barrow Bridge open with a boat passing through.
- Coordinates: 52.28146°N 7.00138°W
- Carries: Trains
- Crosses: River Barrow
- Locale: County Kilkenny and County Wexford
- Other name(s): Barrow Viaduct; Barrow Railway Bridge
- Maintained by: Iarnród Éireann

Characteristics
- Design: pratt truss
- Material: Steel
- Total length: 2,131 ft (650 m)
- Clearance below: 26 ft (7.9 m)

History
- Architect: Sir Benjamin Baker
- Constructed by: Sir William Arrol
- Fabrication by: Sir William Arrol and Co.
- Construction start: 1902
- Construction end: 1906
- Opened: 1906
- Closed: 2010

Location
- Interactive map of Barrow Bridge

Barrow rail bridge, (or the Barrow viaduct), is a pratt truss type of railway bridge that spans the river Barrow between County Kilkenny and County Wexford in the south east of Ireland. This rural landmark with a length of 2,131 ft (650 m) is the longest bridge on the river. It was second longest bridge in Ireland and the third longest rail bridge in the British Isles. Designed by Sir Benjamin Baker and built by the firm of Sir William Arrol. It is known locally as Barrow Bridge.

Part of a development to improve cross-channel passenger services. The steel truss single track bridge was built between 1902 and 1906 by English and Irish railway companies, it operated passenger services between Rosslare Harbour and Waterford until 2010. It is maintained by Iarnród Éireann, the Irish rail operator.

This bridge is one of six rail bridges of 45 bridges on the Barrow. It spans the river just upstream from its confluence with another of the three sisters the River Suir. Close to Great Island Power Station near Cheekpoint. It is the last bridge on the river Barrow and opens approximately twice daily to permit shipping and yachts to pass upstream to New Ross.

In 2021, reports in local media suggested the bridge would be permanently opened to shipping. This proposal was later reversed. After a collision with a ship in February 2022, Irish Rail announced plans to pin the bridge open in December 2022 to perform repair works.

In May 2024, the repair project on the bridge was confirmed as part of a capital investment plan in the South East region.

== History ==
It is an important element of the early 20th century transport heritage of Kilkenny and Wexford. Built as a joint venture between the Fishguard and Rosslare Railways and Harbours Company (FRR + H Co) and the Great Southern and Western Railway and Great Western Railway. The bridge forms part of the Limerick-Rosslare railway line, which was extended in 1906 to improve cross-channel passenger services from Rosslare Strand to Waterford. After the Tay Bridge and Forth Bridge it was the third longest rail bridge in Britain and Ireland.

== Design ==
This elegant and pragmatic bridge represents a striking rural landmark on the River Barrow. Designed by the consulting engineer to the Rosslare & Waterford Railway, Sir Benjamin Baker. Baker had been responsible, with Sir John Fowler, for the design of the Forth Rail Bridge, and had designed the Keady viaduct and Tassagh viaduct.

The steel bridge was supplied and built by the building contractor Sir William Arrol Sir William Arrol and Co.. The Glaswegian firm were engineers and bridge builders, of Dalmarnock, Scotland. Arrol had also worked on the Forth Rail Bridge.

The track used 87lb bullhead rail. The timber sleepers were "laid in 45-foot lengths". The signalling system was Electric Train Staff (ETS) with lower quadrant semaphore signals. This single track was the longest railway bridge in Ireland at a length of 2,131 ft (650 m).

== Description ==
This bridge is one of six rail bridges crossing the Barrow and is one of 45 bridges on the river. On the rail line there is a short tunnel on the Kilkenny side. It stands 26 ft (7.9 m) above the high water mark,

Each of its 13 main spans of 148 ft (45 m) are supported on twin cast iron piers. The third span from the Kilkenny side can be electrically pivoted open from a cabin atop the span to allow ships to pass through. The end spans are 144 ft (44 m).

In 2014 it was listed by An Taisce in its "Buildings at Risk Register". An Taisce records "The structure does not appear to be maintained and there are obvious signs of deterioration." and that "a conservation management plan should be applied to it, to help preserve our rail heritage".

== See also ==
- List of bridges in the Republic of Ireland
- History of rail transport in Ireland
- List of bridges in Ireland
