= River Greese =

River in southeastern Ireland, tributary of the Barrow

Coordinates: 53.025833°N 6.763113°W

River Greese (Griese)
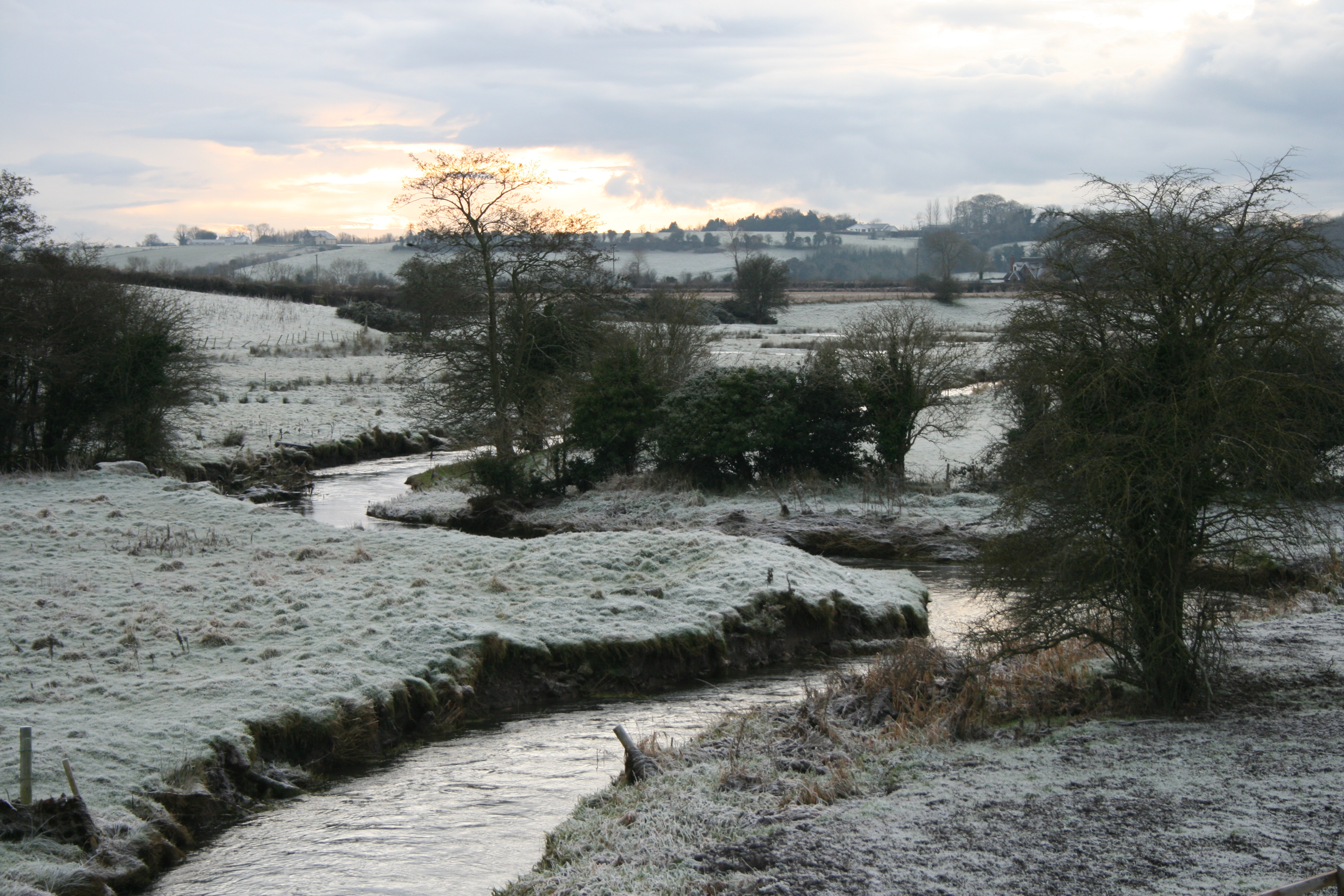
- The Greese in County Kildare
- Native name: An Ghrís (Irish)

Location
- Country: Ireland

Physical characteristics
- Source
  - location: Dunlavin, County Wicklow
  - elevation: ~146 m (479 ft)
- Mouth
  - location: Celtic Sea at Waterford Harbour via River Barrow
- Length: ~35 km (22 mi)
- Basin size: 72 km^{2} (28 sq mi)
- Discharge
  - average: 0.22 m^{3}/s (7.8 cu ft/s)

The River Greese (also spelled Griese; Irish: An Ghrís) is a small, fast-flowing river in south-east, Ireland, and a tributary of the River Barrow.

== Name ==
The river takes its name from Killeen Cormac, which bears the name capella de Gris ("Gris Chapel") in Crede Mihi, a c. 1280 ancient register of the Archbishops of Dublin, with the name also spelled Grys/Gryse in later accounts, and the rivulus de Grys appearing in John Alen's 1533 Reportorium Viride. Jacob Nevill's 1760 map shows the River Greeces, while Greese /ˈɡriːs/ is the spelling generally used in the modern day, although Griese is also used.

== Course ==
The river rises near Dunlavin, County Wicklow in the townland of Tober. It then runs south-west and forms part of the County Wicklow/Kildare border. The Greese continues west past Killeen Cormac (formerly capella de Gris, from which the river takes its name). It is bridged by the R448 road at Moyleabbey, County Kildare. It meets a tributary in Crookstown and passes under the R415, then flows southward through Ballitore. The Greese flows south-southwest, crossing under the M9, through Kilkea Golf Club and past Kilkea Castle, passing under the Dublin–Waterford railway line at Newtownpilsworth/Dunmanoge and draining into the River Barrow in the Jerusalem townland, Painestown downstream of Maganey Lock (this last stretch forms part of the County Carlow/Kildare border).

== Wildlife ==
Thomas James Rawson, in his Statistical Survey of the County of Kildare in 1807 described how "The (River) Greece and Lerr, between Carlow and Athy, and all the other small rivers, swarm with the most excellent trout".

Fish include brown trout. stone loach, salmon, eel, three-spined stickleback and river lamprey.
