= River Suir Bridge =

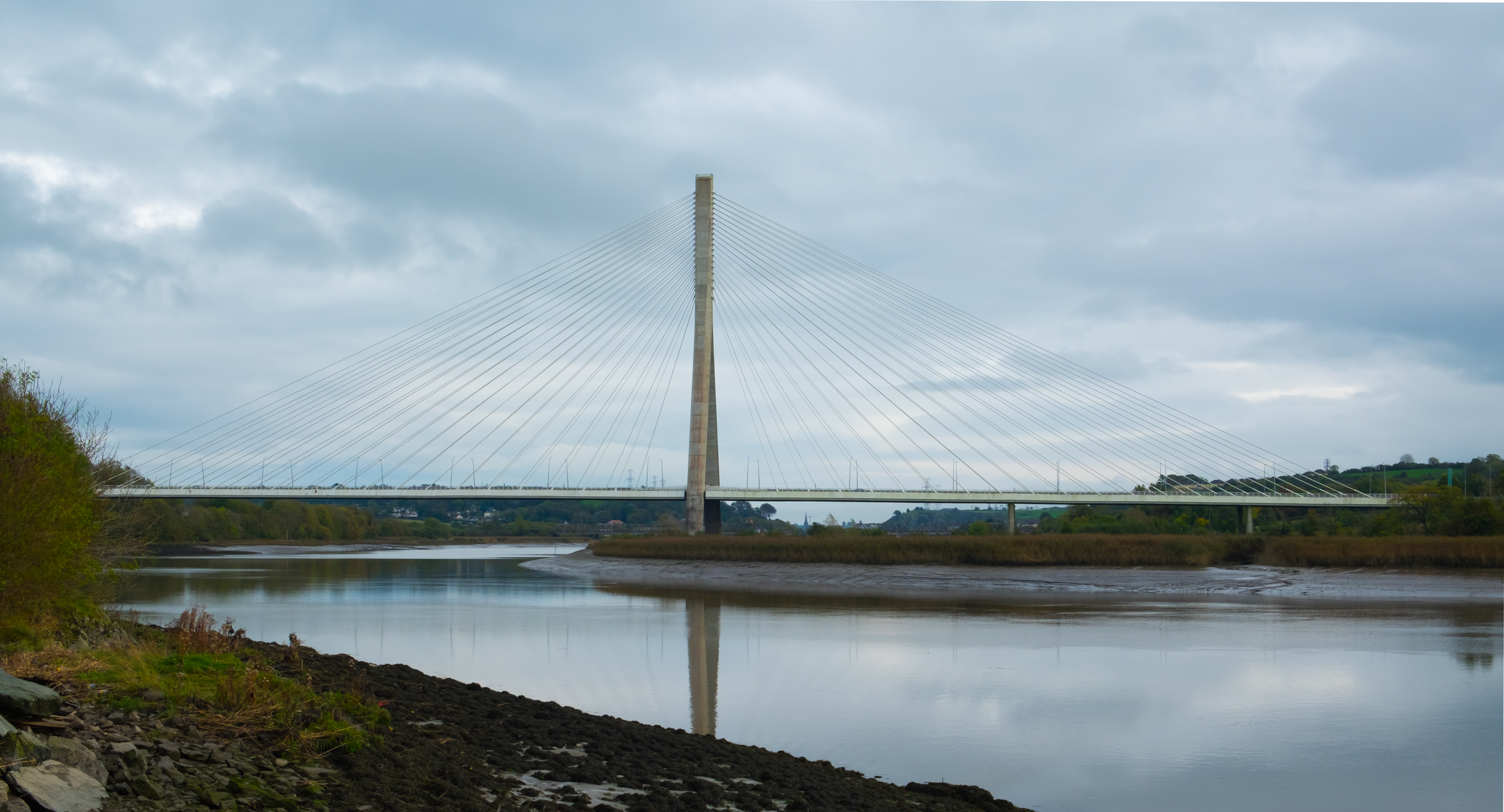
- The bridge viewed from Granagh Castle
- Coordinates: 52°16′44″N 7°09′04″W
- Carries: 4 lanes
- Crosses: River Suir
- Locale: Waterford City
- Official name: Thomas Francis Meagher Bridge
- Maintained by: Celtic Roads Group

Characteristics
- Design: cable-stayed bridge
- Total length: 465m
- Width: 30.6m
- Height: 112m
- Longest span: 230m
- No. of spans: 5
- Piers in water: 0
- Clearance above: 14m

History
- Construction start: 2006
- Construction end: 2009
- Opened: 19 October 2009

Statistics
- Toll: Cars: €2.10; Motorcycles: €1.10; Coaches: €3.80; Light commercial: €3.80; Trucks: €5.40 - €6.80

Location
- Interactive map of River Suir Bridge

The River Suir Bridge is a cable-stayed bridge over the River Suir in Ireland. It was built as part of the N25 Waterford bypass, and opened to traffic on 19 October 2009, approximately ten months ahead of schedule. The Viking settlement at Woodstown was discovered during the project and the route of the southern approach roads was altered to preserve the site.

The 230-metre (750 ft) main span had the longest single bridge span in the Republic of Ireland, until the opening of the Rose Fitzgerald Kennedy Bridge, taking that record from the Boyne River Bridge on the Dublin to Belfast M1 motorway. By comparison, the main span of the Foyle Bridge in Northern Ireland is four metres longer.

== Overview ==
The cable-stayed bridge with its 112-metre-tall (367 ft) tower, is a landmark structure for Waterford City and surrounding areas. The tower is constructed on the south side of the river. A series of "stay cables" fan out from the top of the tower to support the main span at intervals of about 10 metres. Corresponding cables fan to the back spans using the weight of the back span and anchor piles to balance the forces and "keep the tower standing straight".

== Other bridges at Waterford City ==
- The first permanent bridge at Waterford City was the so-called "Timbertoes" bridge (1793-1913)
- It was replaced by the Redmond Bridge (1910-1984)
- The current city-centre bridge is the Rice Bridge (1982–present)
- The River Suir Bridge marks the first time Waterford city has been served by two bridges

== Gallery ==
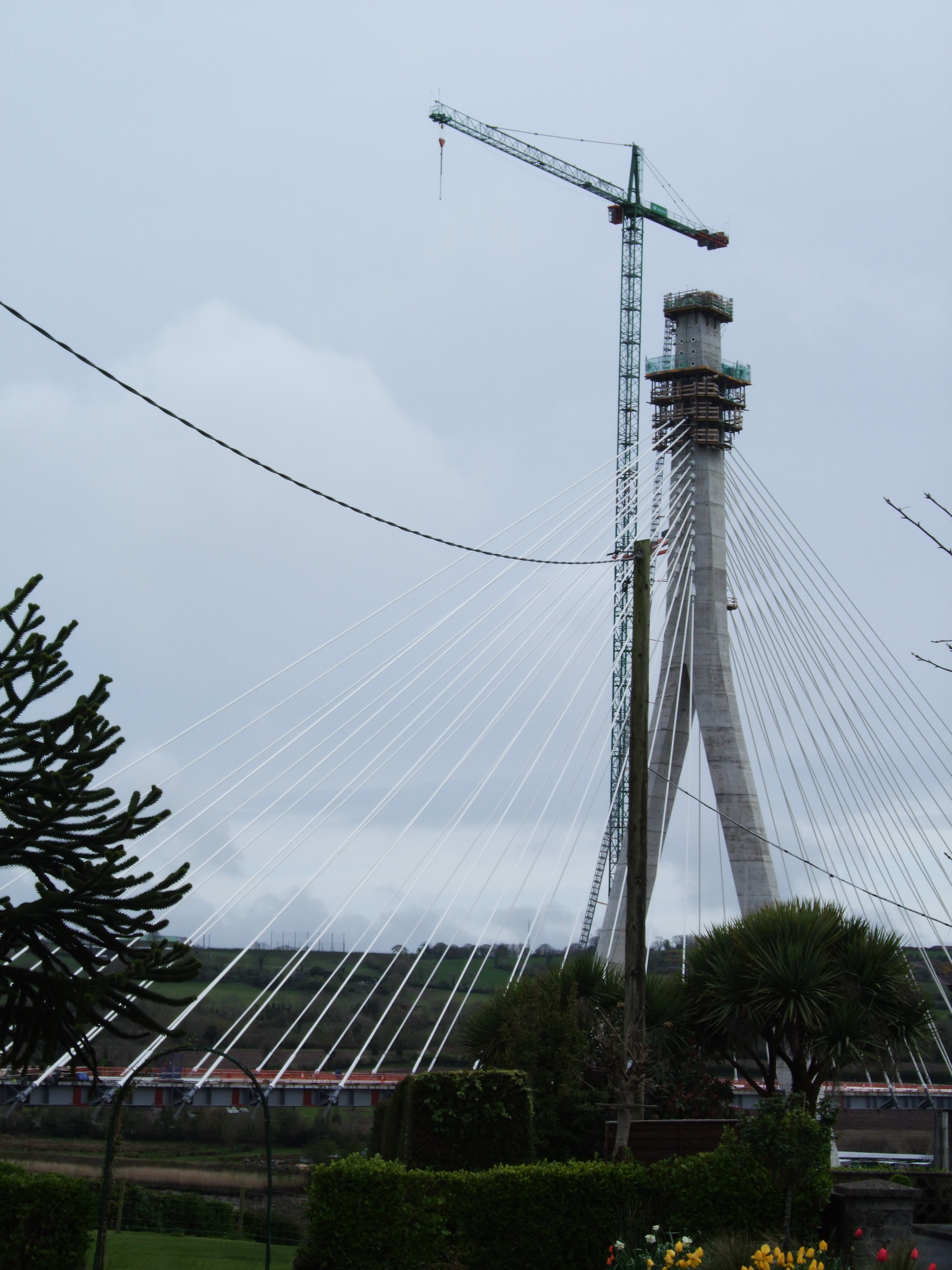
The Suir Bridge under construction in April 2009

The tower on opening day

Close-up of the tower on opening day

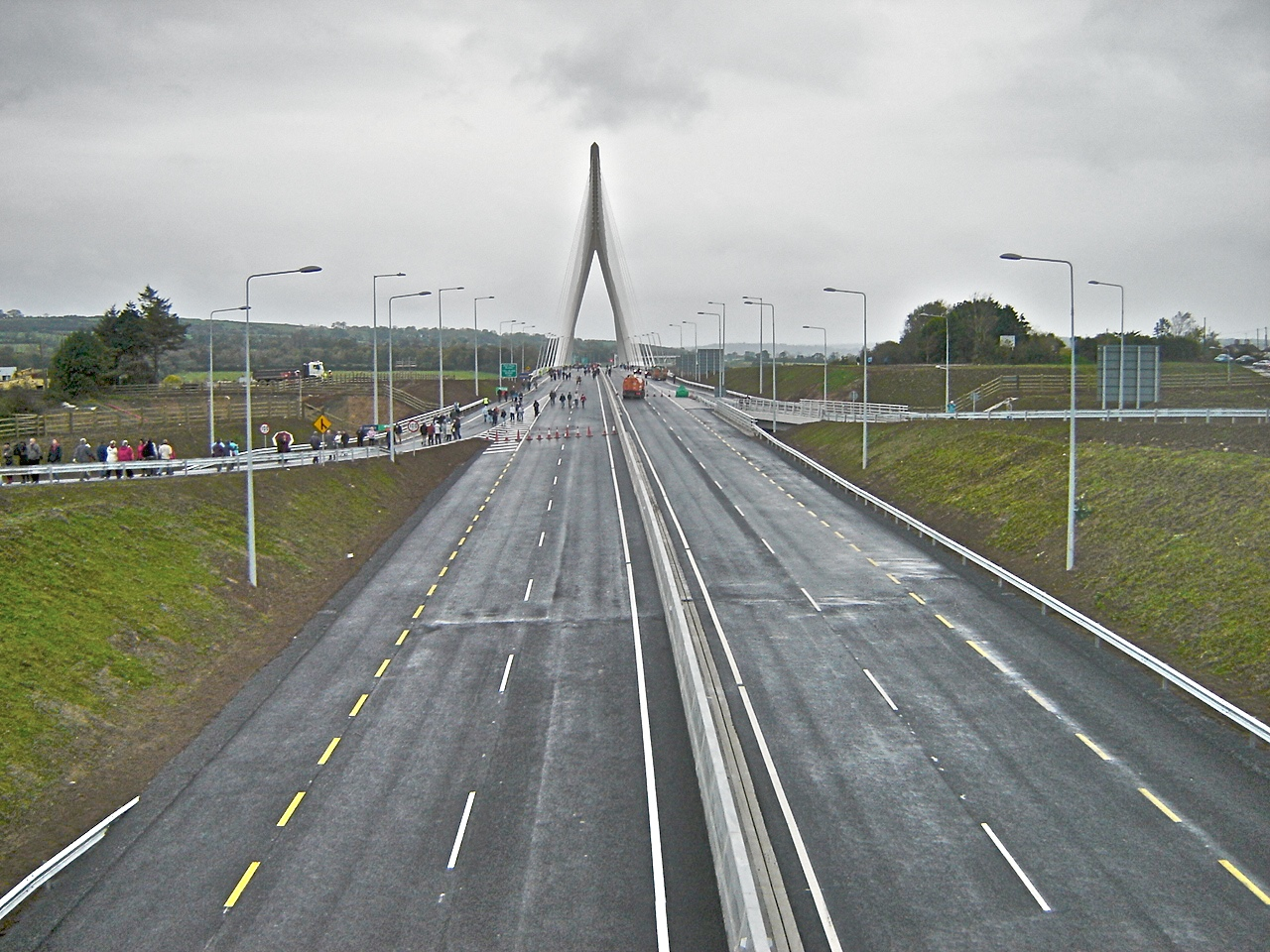
Opening day

== See also ==
- Roads in Ireland
- Atlantic Corridor
- List of Ireland-related topics
