= Killeen Cormac =

Coordinates: 53.028422°N 6.760689°W

Killeen Cormac, aka Cell Fine Chormaic (Church of the Kindred of Cormac), is an early ecclesiastical site in County Kildare, Ireland.

== Etymology ==
The name comes from the legend described below. An earlier name, capella de Gris ("Gris Chapel"), quoted in the Crede Mihi, an ancient register of the Archbishops of Dublin, gave its name to the passing river.

== Geography ==
The River Greese or Griese, a tributary of the Barrow, separates the counties of Kildare and Wicklow. On the left bank of the Griese, lies a long esker called ‘Bullock Hill'. On the other bank, the Kildare side, is another esker called ‘Crocbunnion'. To the west of this there is the highest elevation, of the group, Rathownbeg. On its summit is a ráth of large proportions, and at its base flows a small stream known as ‘Scrughan', which joins the Griese. Between this hill and Knockbunnion is another esker of oval shape lying on a north–south axis, which is where Killeen Cormac is located.

== Description ==
Killeen Cormac was used as a pagan burial ground before the introduction of Christianity. The area is enclosed within a stone wall, with trees planted around the tumulus. There are three terraces, which surround the esker. Within this enclosure are pillar stones, placed at regular spaces around the base of the tumulus; one of the pillar stones has an incised bust of the Redeemer. Some of the pillars have Ogham inscriptions. These Ogham inscriptions are reminiscent of the tumuli on the Boyne. The whole enclosure is occupied with graves, and on the summit is an oblong depression, the site of an early church.

== History and mythology ==
Killeen Cormac was used by local families as their burial ground until recently, with Mass celebrated from time to time for those interred there, and the graveyard cleaned up.

The site is believed to be identical with the 'Cell Fine' where, according to the Vita tripartita, Palladius left his books, together with a writing tablet and relics of Peter and Paul.

On the lowest side of the tumulus there is another pillar stone. On its top surface there is a mark, which represents a hound's paw.

This stone is the subject of local legends. Local tradition, with a view perhaps to account for the name of the cemetery, tells that this stone marks the grave of Cormac, King of Munster. He was borne to this cemetery by a team of bullocks that were allowed to follow their own instincts in bearing the body of Cormac, for which rival claims were made, to this grave. Tradition states that he was carried from a long distant place, from the direction of Timolin, and that when the team reached the ‘Doon' of Ballynure the bullocks were overcome with thirst. They pawed the ground, from which emerged water. This still flows by the side of the road opposite Donoghue's. The bullocks after drinking the water, travelled on until they reached Bullock Hill opposite to the cemetery. At this place they refused to move further. From this it was apparent to them that Killeen was to be the last resting place for Cormac. The team of bullocks, having crossed the stream, left the body for burial in the cemetery. They travelled back across the marsh between the cemetery and Bullock Hill. While crossing the Griese they were swept away and lost. Another version of the legend suggests that there was a hound on the team with the corpse; when it halted at Bullock Hill, the hound jumped across the river to the cemetery and, alighting to the top of the pillar stone, impressed the mark of his paw, thus indicating the precise spot where Cormac was to be laid.

There are said to be seven bishops, seven presbyters, and seven virgins buried at Killeen Cormac.
