= Woodstown =

Archaeological site in County Waterford, Ireland

- Baile na Coille
- Location within Ireland
- 52°15′03″N 07°11′42″W
- Type: Settlement
- Periods: Viking Age
- Location: County Waterford

History
- Built: 830-940 AD

Site notes
- Length: 1.5 km (0.93 mi)
- Width: 0.5 km (0.31 mi)
- Area: 75 ha (190 acres)
- Excavation dates: 2003-2007
- Condition: Partially preserved
- Owner: Private

Woodstown (Irish: Baile na Coille, IPA:[ˈbˠalʲəˈnˠaˈkɛl̪ʲə]) is home to a historic settlement measuring 1.5 km by 0.5 km, located on the southern bank of the River Suir, about 5.5 km west of Waterford City in the southeast of Ireland. This site should not be confused with Woodstown beach which is on the western side of Waterford Harbour near the fishing port of Dunmore East.

== Discovery ==
The National Roads Authority had planned to build a road over the site which showed no evidence of a historical monument. Investigation ditch and gulley across the road route led to the discovery of the site. In 2005 the site was declared a national monument and the motorway bypassed the site. The NRA, who have no responsibility for the site in the future, published reports, based on excavations in April and August 2003. These suggest that the site found at Woodstown was a defended, riverside settlement with evidence of industrial activity, most likely dating from the period - 830 to 940 AD.

With over 600 features such as house gullies, pits and fireplaces found, the archaeology points to a densely populated and affluent settlement. Apart from Woodstown, there is no evidence of a large 9th-century Viking settlement in Western Europe. Further small excavations, which took place in 2006, identified a structure which may have been associated with metal-working. Reports on these excavations have yet to be published.

== 9th-century Viking settlement ==
The 2010 International Viking Conference confirmed the site as a longphort - a defensive enclosure built to protect the ships of Viking raiders and the treasure which they amassed, including silver, local captives (whom they would sell as slaves) and cattle.

About 4,000 objects including silver ingots, lead weights, ships nails, Byzantine coins and Viking weaponry have been recovered through preliminary surface test trenching. Much of the metal work found at Woodstown dates back to the mid to late 9th century.

Work being carried out on the grave suggests that it is one of the best equipped such graves from Ireland or Great Britain. Included were a sword (which may have come from Carolingian Francia rather than Norway itself), a spearhead showing silver inlay, a shield which seemed to have been placed over the dead man’s face, an axe and whetstone.

The Viking inhabitants of Woodstown had some very small and apparently personalised weights which they would use to measure very small amounts of silver. The most common unit of measurement is Scandinavian and does not appear to be evident at other sites in Ireland.

Woodstown Vikings seem to have been trading as individuals, buying and selling with locals. This pattern of commerce seems to be confined to the area of Kilkenny and Waterford which may mean a distinctive and type of Viking colonisation and settlement in the south-east of Ireland.

== 5th Century Iron Age settlement ==
Initial studies suggest that the site may have been built and occupied by the local Déise around the time of Saint Patrick and long before the first Vikings arrived in Ireland. At that time, the Déise were established as an outward-looking people with a strong maritime tradition and colonies in south west Wales.
