= Borrisnoe =

Townland in County Tipperary, Ireland

Coordinates: 52.8552°N 7.8963°W

Borrisnoe is a townland just north of Templemore, County Tipperary, Ireland. It is part of the Devil's Bit/Barnane Éile mountain.
