= Cheekpoint =

Village in County Waterford, Ireland

Cheekpoint Pointe na Síge
- Village
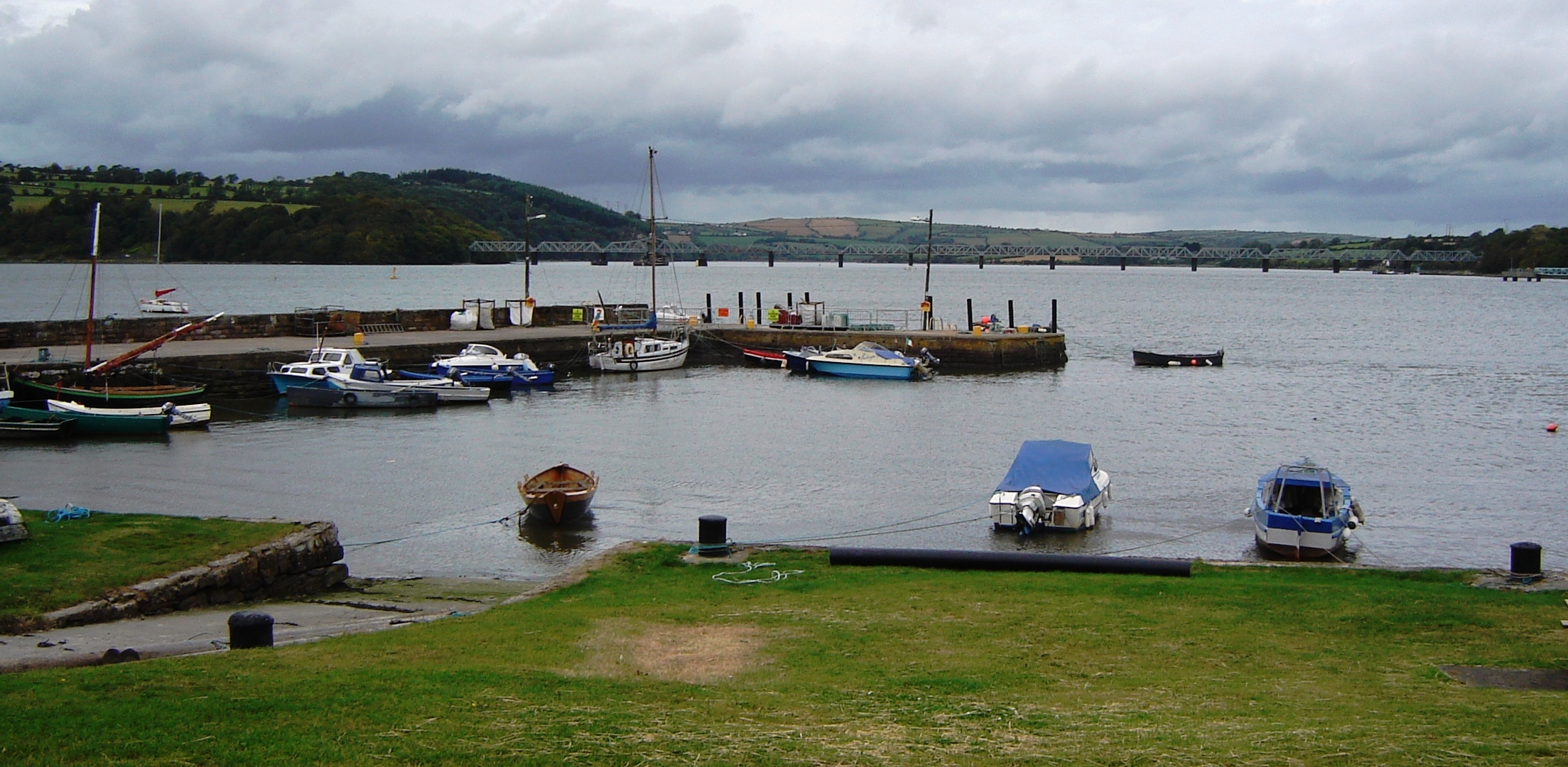
- Cheekpoint harbour
- Interactive map of Cheekpoint
- Coordinates: 52°16′7.7″N 6°59′45″W
- Country: Ireland
- Province: Munster
- County: Waterford

Cheekpoint (Irish: Pointe na Síge) is a village and townland in County Waterford, Ireland, at the confluence of the River Suir and the River Barrow. Located beneath 150-metre-high Minaun Hill, the village has panoramic views of Waterford Harbour, the 650-metre-long Barrow Bridge and Great Island Power Station. Cheekpoint is also surrounded by the Malting Woods which were planted by Cornelius Bolton.

== Toponymy ==
The Irish name for Cheekpoint is Pointe na Síge or perhaps Pointe na Sí (in English: point of the fairies). It is also claimed to mean "point of the streak". Now it is thought that the name comes from a rock called Carraig na Síge out on the river near the low water mark which shows a trail of foam or streak with the ebbing tide.

== Industry ==
Before the building of the pier at Dunmore East, Cheekpoint was a thriving village, being the station at which the mail packets from England for Waterford stopped. In addition there were cotton, rope, and hosiery factories which disappeared when the mail packet station was transferred to Dunmore East on 1 July 1818.

== History ==
Cheekpoint and the lands which surrounded it were owned of the Aylward family from Bristol, who had been granted 7000 acres of pastureland by King Henry II in 1177. They held it until Oliver Cromwell dispossessed them in 1649 when they refused to renounce Catholicism. Cromwell then gave the property to one of his officers, a Captain William Bolton. In 1783, Cornelius Bolton (1751–1829) built Faithlegg House after he inherited estate lands at Faithlegg from his father in 1779.

Cornelius Bolton was a very progressive landlord and he was very interested in helping his tenants to progress. He built the pier at the nearby village of Cheekpoint and then he built a textile factory, a rope factory and a hotel. However these enterprises failed and he went bankrupt in 1819. This was largely due to the mail packet station to Milford Haven in Wales being transferred to Dunmore East in 1818.

Sleater's Topography of Ireland, published in 1806, has the following reference:- "Bolton, formerly called Cheekpoint, cotton factory and hoisery, established by Mr. Bolton. A most commodious Inn for passengers in the packets to and from Milford Haven in Pembrokershire." An earlier writer refers to it - "Mr. Cornelius Bolton lives very retired in the country and has employed a considerable part of his fortune in building a large village where he has established several important manufactures, particularly looms. The industry which he encourages in his colony renders it probable that his expense will be repaid him, and that it will become an object of utility to the public and of profit to him although suggested by motives of humanity".

It also mentions "that to the spirited exertions of Mr. Bolton the citizens of Waterford were said to be primarily indebted for the establishment of the packets from England, and that the diversion of these packets from Cheekpoint to Dunmore East would be a serious loss to the proprietor of Cheekpoint who had expanded a considerable sum of money on hotels and other accommodations, unless Parliament should take this loss into consideration".

The decision by the British Government to grant the money to build the harbour at Dunmore East in 1814 spelt the end for the Cheekpoint enterprise and when the transfer of the mail packet took place in 1818 Cheekpoint ceased to have the passenger business which kept the village alive. The change from sail to steam meant that it would now be possible to run a service between Milford Haven and Ireland to a reasonable schedule and the new harbour at Dunmore East facilitated this greatly.

Cheekpoint was then only used as a fishery harbour in the 19th and 20th centuries and became famous for a certain type of small fishing craft called the Cheekpoint Prong which was 17 ft.6in. long with a 4 ft.8in. beam and was normally rowed or paddled. They were used for long lining and salmon fishing with drift nets, snap nets and draft nets.

In 1995, a series of groins (or groyne) were built up to 200 metres out in the river to divert the Cheekpoint Bar which was a mudbank impeding large vessels from travelling to the Port of Waterford. These groins resulted in the harbour at Cheekpoint silting up so badly that only small craft may now enter. The harbour is not used very often now by visiting craft because of this difficulty.

== Transport ==
The village is 12 km by road from Waterford city. As at 2024 there is an occasional Local Link bus service to and from Waterford city.

== See also ==
- List of towns and villages in Ireland
