= Rose Fitzgerald Kennedy Bridge =

Bridge in Ireland

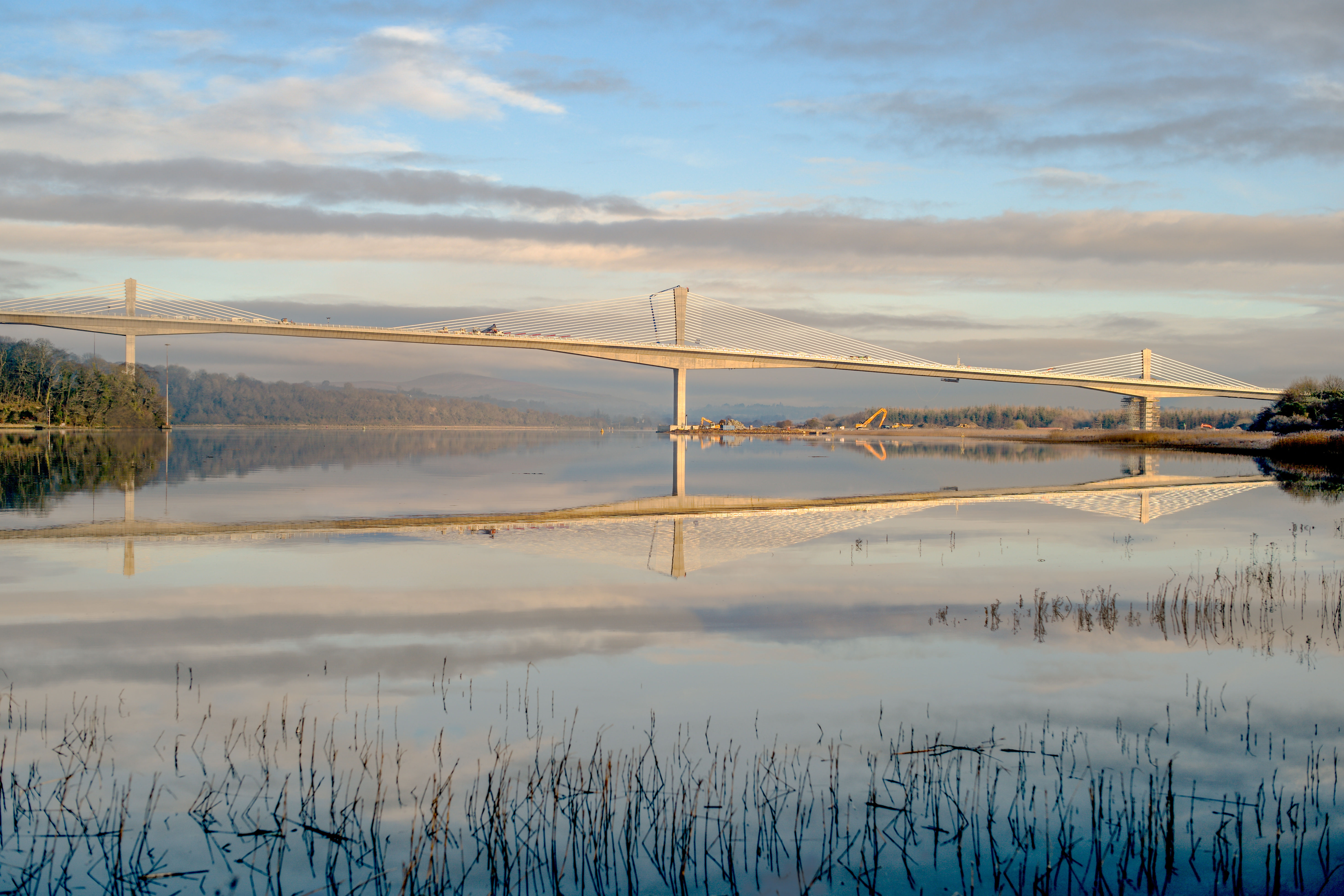
- Rose Fitzgerald Kennedy Bridge
- Coordinates: 52°21′24″N 6°59′32″W
- Carries: N25 road
- Crosses: River Barrow
- Locale: Glenmore
- Official name: Rose Fitzgerald Kennedy Bridge
- Maintained by: BAM Civil and Iridium

Characteristics
- Design: Extradosed bridge
- Material: Concrete
- Total length: 887 metres (2,910 ft)
- Longest span: 230 metres (750 ft)
- No. of spans: 9
- Piers in water: 1
- Clearance above: 36 metres (118 ft)

History
- Designer: ARUP and Carlos Fernandez Casado SL
- Construction start: 2016
- Construction end: December 2019
- Opened: 30 January 2020

Location
- Interactive map of Rose Fitzgerald Kennedy Bridge

The Rose Fitzgerald Kennedy Bridge is an extradosed bridge over the River Barrow in Ireland. It was built as part of the N25 New Ross Bypass, and was officially opened on 29 January 2020 by Taoiseach Leo Varadkar and opened to traffic on 30 January 2020, becoming Ireland's longest bridge. The bridge received in 2021 an Outstanding Structure Award from the International Association for Bridge and Structural Engineering.

== Name ==
The bridge is controversially officially named after Rose Fitzgerald Kennedy, the mother of former US President John F. Kennedy whose ancestors came from nearby Dunganstown. It is also popularly referred to as the Pink Rock Bridge or as the New Ross Bypass Bridge, and as the Barrow Crossing in technical materials related to its construction.

== Overview ==
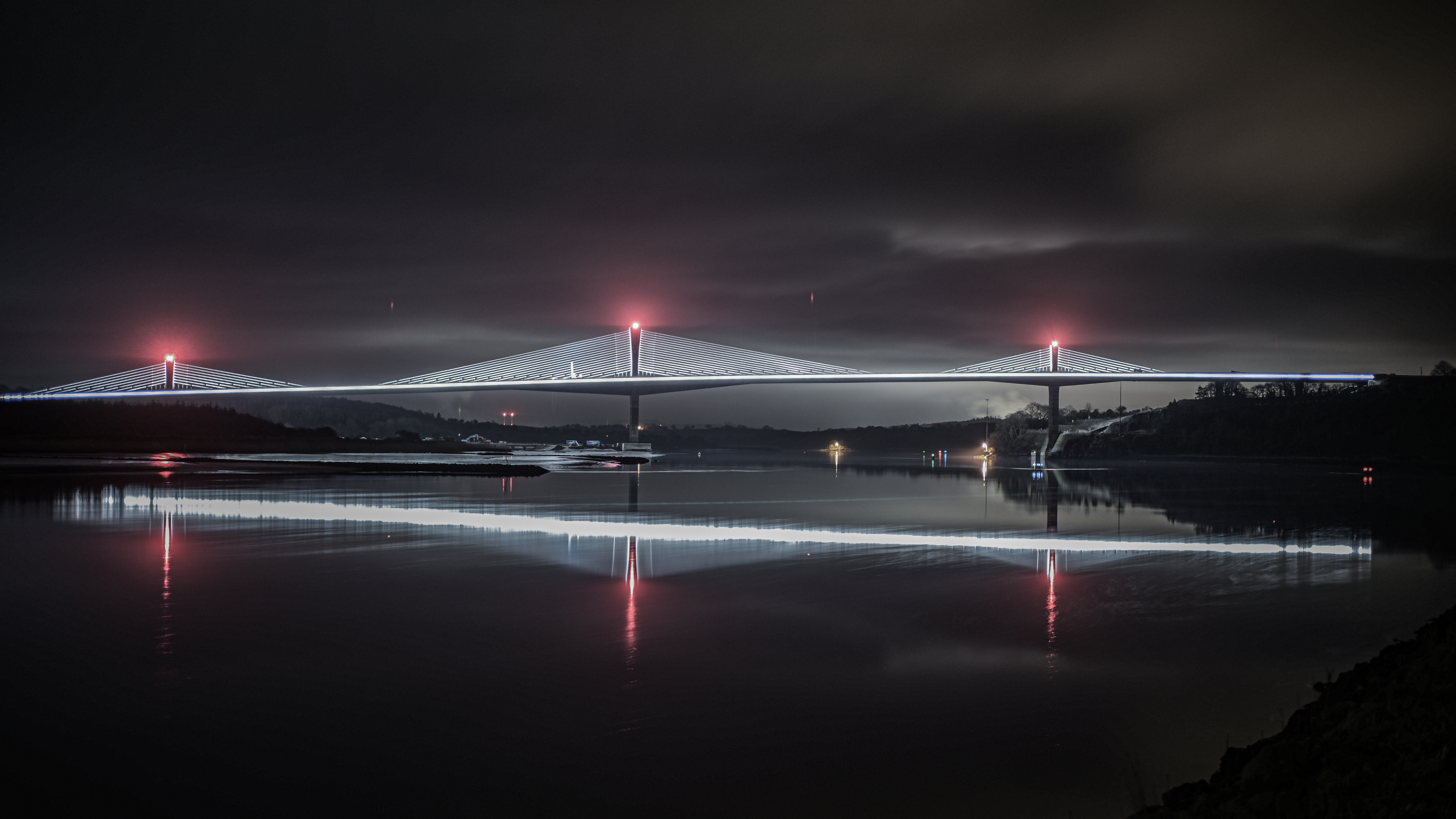
Rose Fitzgerald Kennedy Bridge (night view)

The 230 metres (750 ft) main spans of the bridge are the longest concrete-only extradosed box-girder bridge spans in the world. The spans are equal in length to the main span of the N25 Suir Bridge in Waterford; and four metres shorter the main span of the Foyle Bridge in Northern Ireland, which is 21 metres shorter in total length. The two central main spans are supported by a central plane of stay cables passing through saddles located on three towers at the three central supports. The distinctive feature of the Bridge is the different height of the towers. The side towers have a height of 16.2m and have 8 passing cables and the central pier has a height of 27.0m and 18 passing cables.

== Construction method ==
The side spans over dry land on both sides of the river Barrow were built using a scaffold and a wing form traveller. The main spans were built using the balanced cantilever method. At its maximum length from the central pier, the west span cantilevered 140m over the river.

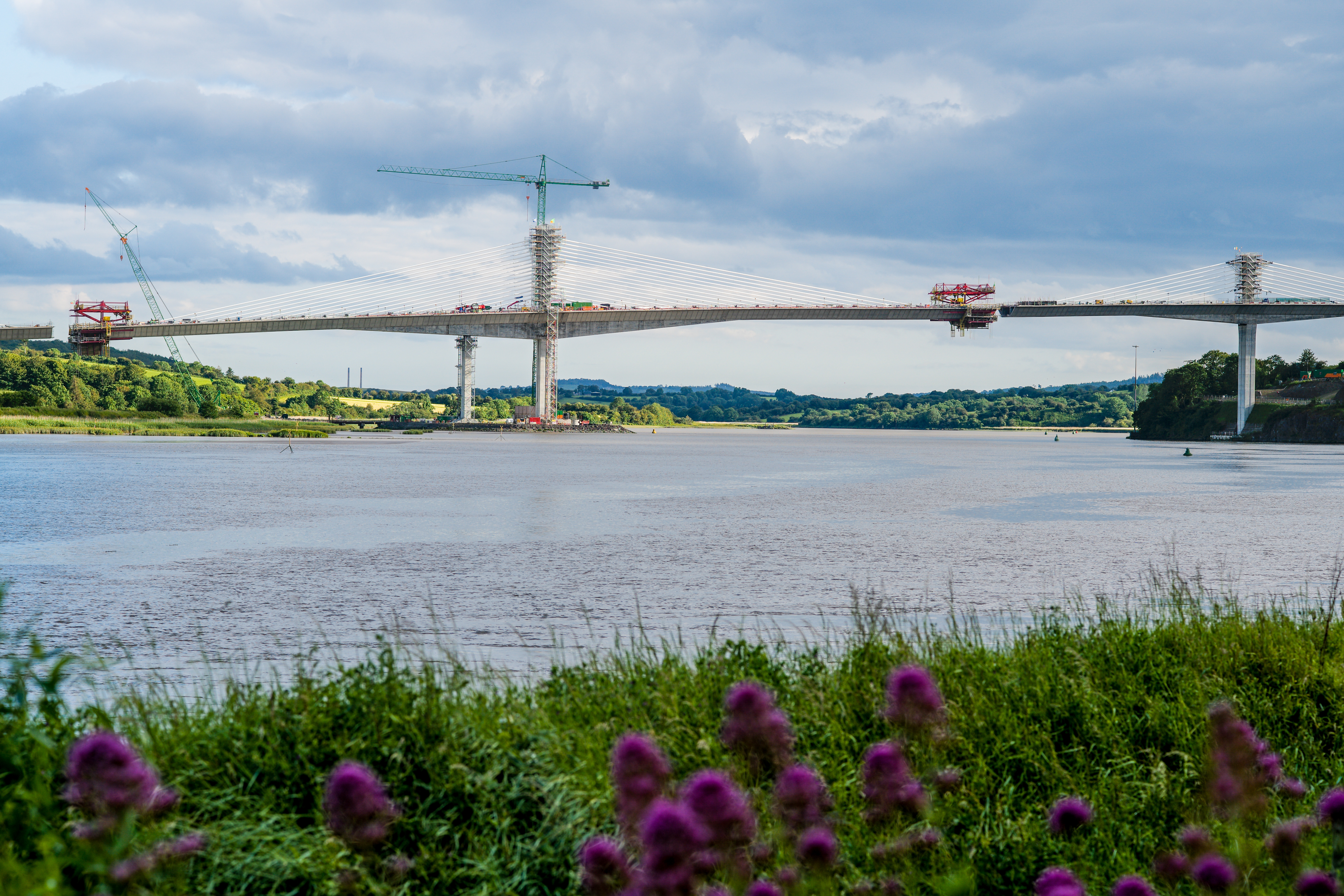
Rose Fitzgerald Kennedy Bridge during construction

== See also ==
- Roads in Ireland
- Atlantic Corridor
- List of Ireland-related topics
