= Mary McAleese Boyne Valley Bridge =

Cable-stayed bridge in Ireland

Mary McAleese; Boyne Valley Bridge; Droichead Ghleann na Bóinne Mháire Mhic Ghiolla Íosa
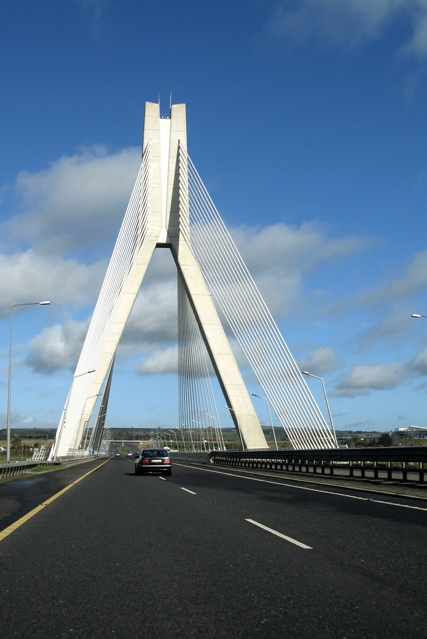
- M1 traffic crossing the bridge
- Coordinates: 53.7179°N 6.3967°W
- Carries: Motor vehicles; (on the M1 motorway)
- Crosses: River Boyne
- Locale: County Louth/County Meath border, 3 km (1.9 mi) west of Drogheda
- Other names: Boyne River Bridge; Boyne Valley Bridge
- Named for: Mary McAleese; (President of Ireland 1997–2011)
- Owner: Transport Infrastructure Ireland
- Maintained by: Celtic Roads Group
- Preceded by: Obelisk Bridge; (L16014 road)
- Followed by: R132 road

Characteristics
- Design: Cable-stayed bridge
- Total length: 352.5 m (1,156 ft)
- Width: 34.5 m (113 ft)
- Height: 95 m (312 ft)
- Longest span: 170 m (560 ft)
- No. of spans: 6
- Piers in water: 0
- Clearance above: 20 m (66 ft)
- No. of lanes: Four

History
- Designer: Roughan & O'Donovan
- Constructed by: Cleveland Bridge & Engineering Company
- Construction start: May 2000
- Construction end: 2003
- Construction cost: €35 million
- Opened: 9 June 2003

Statistics
- Toll: €2.30 for cars

Location
- Interactive map of: Mary McAleese; Boyne Valley Bridge

The Mary McAleese Boyne Valley Bridge (Irish: Droichead Ghleann na Bóinne Mháire Mhic Ghiolla Íosa) is a cable-stayed bridge in County Meath, and County Louth, Ireland. It spans the River Boyne 3 kilometres (1.9 mi) west of Drogheda on the county boundary between County Meath and County Louth and is part of the M1 Motorway. When it opened in June 2003, it was the longest cable-stayed bridge in Ireland until 19 October 2009, when the River Suir Bridge opened on the N25.

Due to environmental concerns, an Environmental Impact Statement (EIS) was carried out for the bridge separately from the M1 EIS—the first such formal EIS carried out and published for a bridge in Ireland. The bridge was built between 2000 and 2003. It was designed Roughan & O'Donovan consulting engineers, who were awarded the Association of Consulting Engineers of Ireland (ACEI) Presidential Award in 2005 for the design.

== Overview ==
Designing a road bridge over the Boyne was not an easy task. At the chosen point, 3 kilometres (1.9 mi) upstream from Drogheda, the ground level on the south is elevated, with a sudden drop while the north bank slopes gradually down to the river. The area is environmentally sensitive, especially the reed beds on the north bank and the flora and fauna of Yellow Island in the middle of the river. The area has a rich heritage as it is also situated adjacent to the area in which the Battle of the Boyne took place in 1690.

The answer was a cable-stayed bridge. Although at a cost of €35 million it would be more expensive than a standard road bridge, it could incorporate a much longer main span without the need for supports in the river, so the engineers could protect the river and the island from any interference. It would also look attractive, with a tall pylon at the south side and cable stays fanning out from it, supporting the main structure.

Construction was carried out by Cleveland Bridge & Engineering Company. Construction methodology by Richard Hornby & Bruce Ramsay of Cleveland Bridge. The bridge is the first cable stay bridge in the world constructed using the incremental launching method (ILM) for the superstructure erection. The construction commenced in May 2000 and the bridge opened on 9 June 2003. The bridge is managed under a public-private partnership between the National Roads Authority (Note: Now Transport Infrastructure Ireland) (on behalf of the Irish Government) and a private company, Celtic Roads Group. The concession operator has an obligation to maintain the road for 30 years.

The bridge and motorway are tolled in both directions to finance its construction and maintenance, and to generate profit for Celtic Roads Group.

In 2006, the Bridge was awarded the Excellence Award (Civil) from the Association of Consulting Engineers of Ireland.

== Name ==
In October 2012, Meath County Council proposed renaming the Boyne River Bridge after former President of Ireland, Mary McAleese to honour her contribution to the Northern Ireland peace process. The name Mary McAleese Bridge was initially proposed, but some felt the name should reflect the local area, so on 8 June 2013 a ceremony was held to rename the bridge the Mary McAleese Boyne Valley Bridge.
