= Rice Bridge =

Bridge in Waterford, County Waterford, Ireland

Coordinates: 52°15′54″N 7°07′06″W

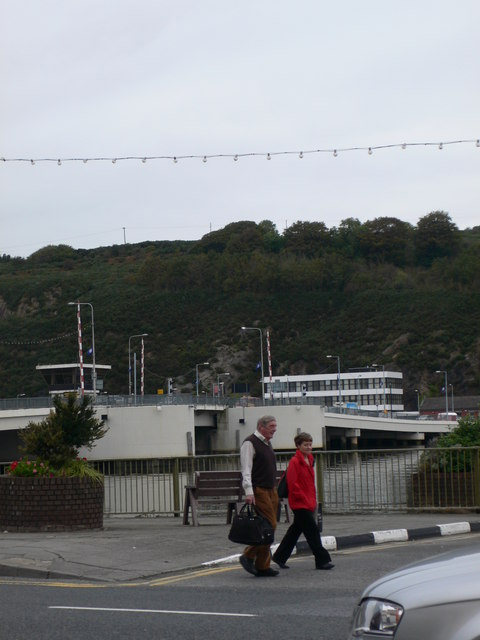
Rice Bridge

The Rice Bridge is a bridge in the city centre of Waterford, Ireland. Located towards the north side of the city, it was constructed in stages between 1982 and 1986, with an official opening of the first two lanes in 1984. It is named after Edmund Ignatius Rice (and occasionally also called the Edmund Rice Bridge or Brother Edmund Ignatius Rice Bridge). The Rice Bridge was constructed after the previous bridge was deemed unsafe.

== See also ==
- River Suir Bridge
