= Old Weir Bridge =

Bridge in Ireland

The Old Weir Bridge is an ancient bridge located in Killarney National Park in County Kerry, Ireland. It is a twin arch bridge made of stone.

The bridge is situated at the spot known as the "Meeting of the Waters", where the three Killarney lakes meet. The waters from the Upper Lake flow into the Middle (or Muckross Lake) and Lough Leane.

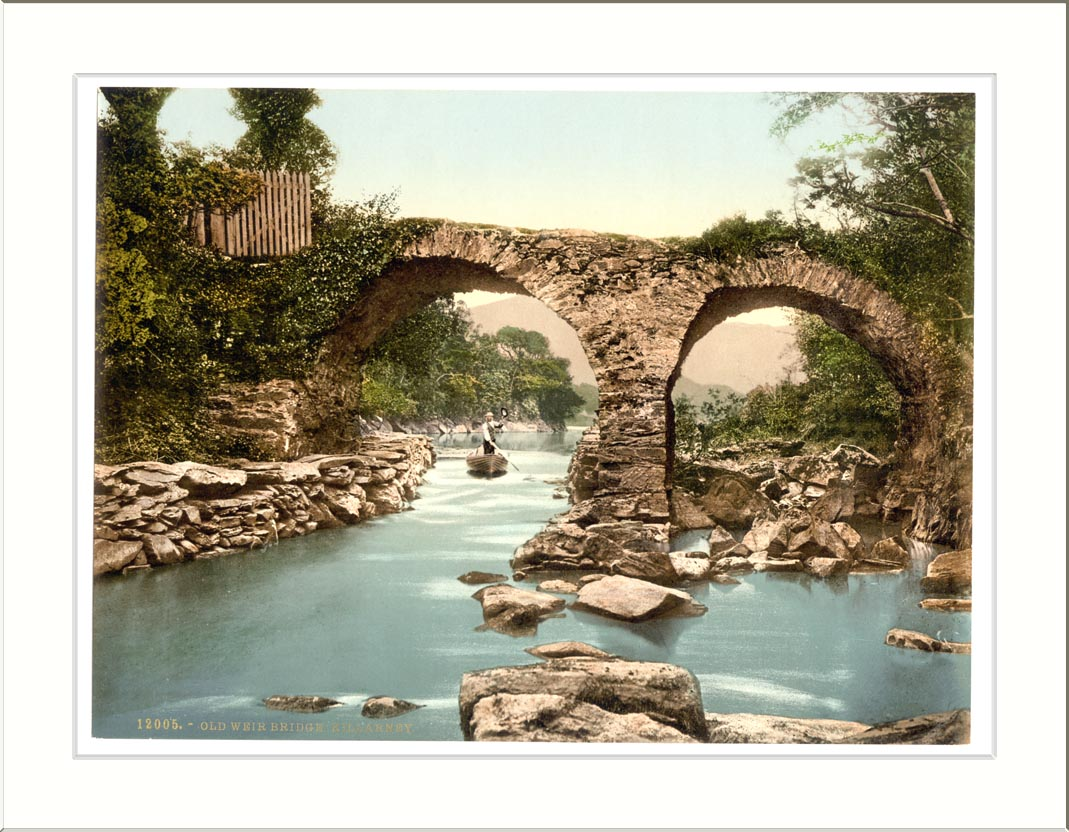
The Old Weir Bridge in a dated drawing.

== History ==
The actual age of the bridge is unclear, but believed to date back to the sixteenth century. A 1780 Fisher print of the bridge shows it already had fallen into a state of disrepair by the late 1700s. and remained so for at least the next 100 years.

The bridge quickly became, (and remains) a popular trip for tourist who use the swift current to propel narrow boats down the inlet.

The bridge survived the devastating floods of September 1867, when local houses, including Dinis Cottage, and other wooden structures were washed away.

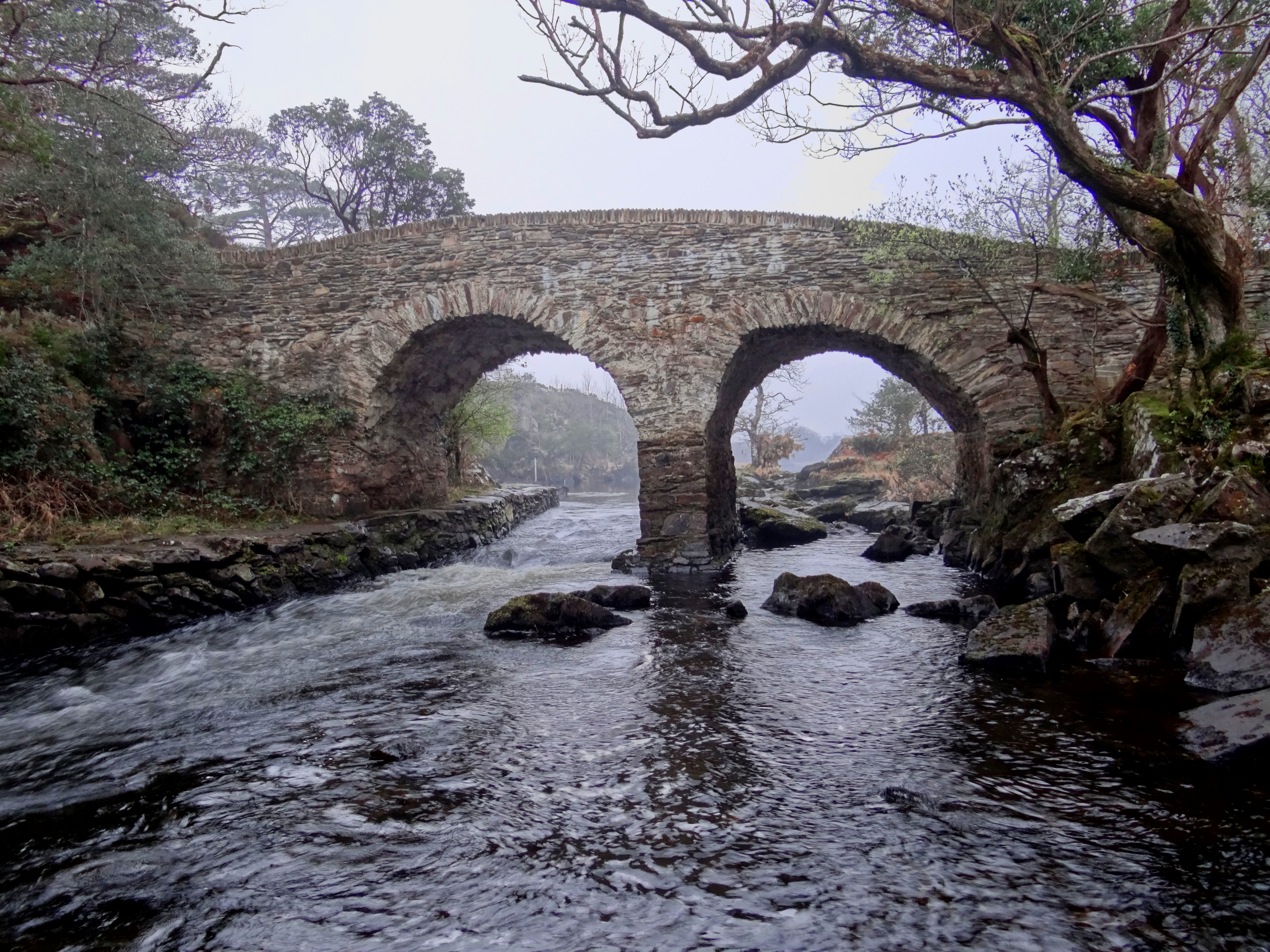
A modern view of the bridge, showing recent repairs. The high-water mark can be seen on the central column.
