= Waterford Harbour =

Coordinates: 52°11′N 6°56′W

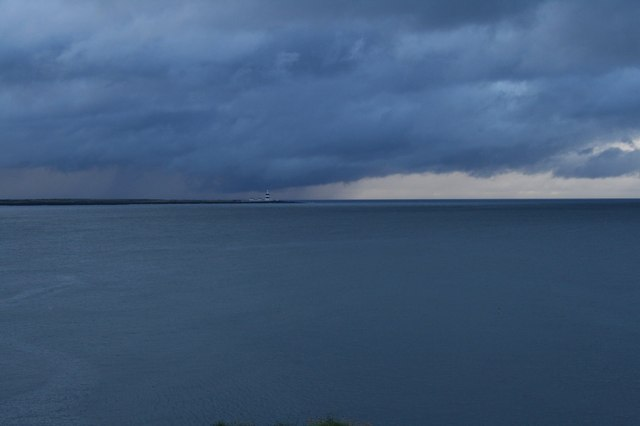
Angry Sky View looking south East over the entrance to Waterford Harbour and the Wexford coast. The lighthouse in the distance is the Hook Head Lighthouse X7397, one of the oldest in the world

Waterford Harbour (Irish: Loch Dá Chaoch / Cuan Phort Láirge) is a natural harbour at the mouth of the Three Sisters; the River Nore, the River Suir and the River Barrow in Ireland. It is navigable for shipping to both Waterford and New Ross. The Port of Waterford is capable of accommodating vessels up to 32,000 tons dwt. It separates County Waterford from County Wexford on the eastern side of the estuary.

Dunmore East is a fishing village and popular holiday resort situated on the west side of the harbour and is generally considered to be the western limit. On the west side, there is also a headland called Creaden Head The eastern limit is Hook Head, marked by the Hook Lighthouse, on the Hook peninsula.
