= River Suir =

River in Ireland, one of the Three Sisters

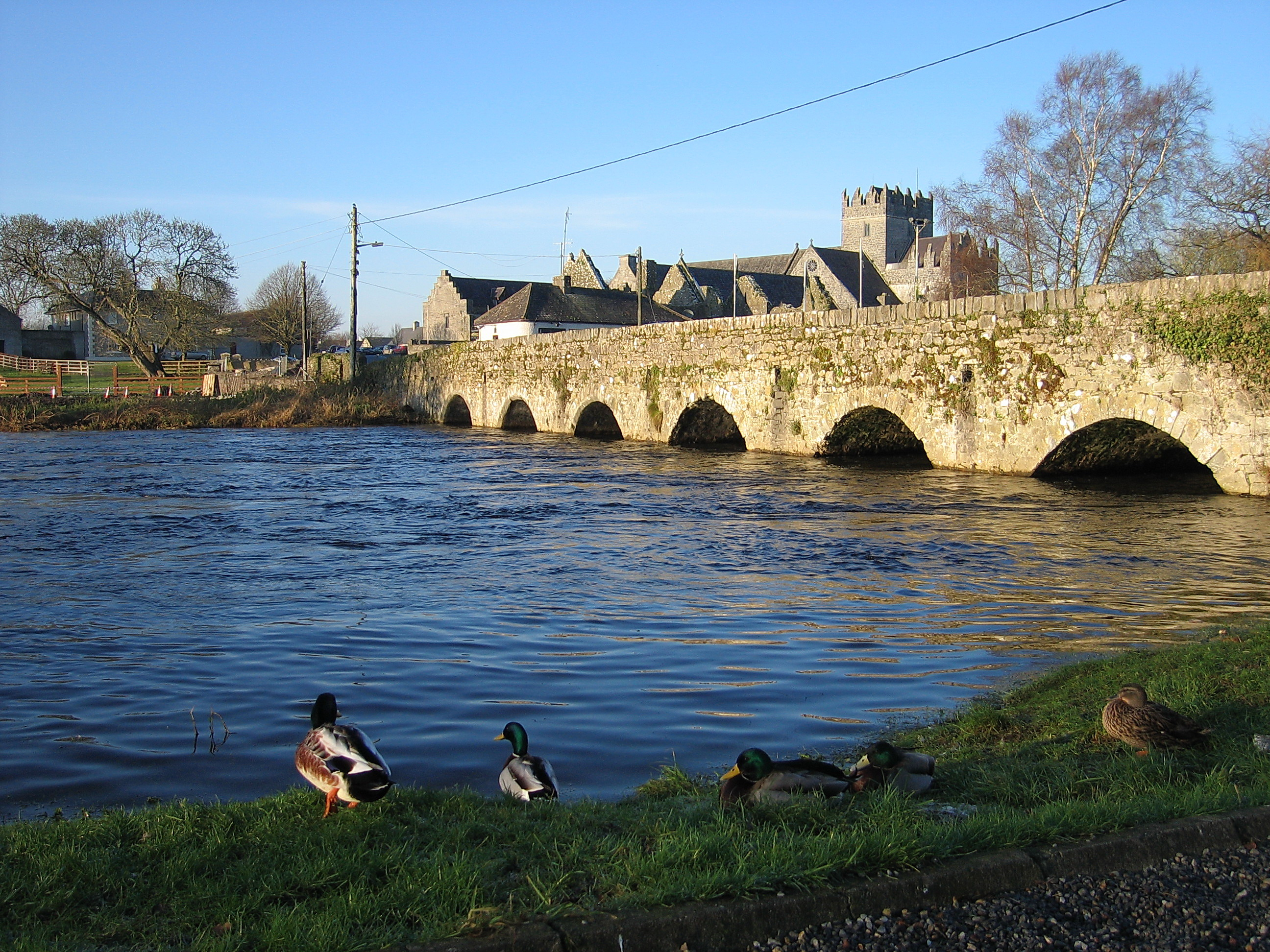
- River Suir at Holycross, County Tipperary

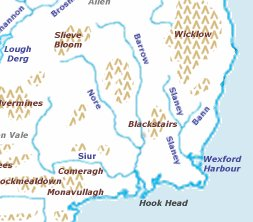
- Map of the Three Sisters, including the Suir
- Etymology: Old Irish siur, "sister"
- Native name: Abhainn na Siúire (Irish)

Location
- Country: Ireland
- Counties: Tipperary, Waterford, Kilkenny

Physical characteristics
- Source: Devil's Bit Mountain
  - location: Templemore, County Tipperary
  - coordinates: 52.821°N 7.914°W
  - elevation: 480 m (1,570 ft)
- Mouth: Waterford Harbour
  - location: Waterford
  - coordinates: 52.11°N 6.56°W
- Length: 185 km (115 mi)
- Basin size: 1,394 sq mi (3,610 km^{2})
- Discharge
  - average: 76.9 m^{3}/s (2,720 cu ft/s)

The River Suir (/ʃʊər/ SHOOR; Irish: an tSiúir [ənʲ ˈtʲuːɾˠ] or Abhainn na Siúire [ˌəun̠ʲ n̪ˠə ˈʃuːɾʲə]) is a river in Ireland that flows into the Celtic Sea through Waterford after a distance of 185 kilometres (115 mi). The catchment area of the Suir is 3,610 km^{2}. Its long-term average flow rate is 76.9 cubic metres per second (m^{3}/s), about twice the flow of either the River Barrow (37.4 m^{3}/s) or the River Nore (42.9 m^{3}/s) before these join, but a little less than the Barrow's flow when it meets the Suir 20 km downstream (over 80 m^{3}/s).

Popular with anglers, it abounds in brown trout and salmon. Although the Suir holds the record for a salmon taken from an Irish river (weighing 57 lb/26 kg, taken on a fly in 1874), as has been the case in many other Atlantic rivers, salmon stocks have been in decline in recent years.

Rising on the slopes of Devil's Bit Mountain, just north of Templemore in County Tipperary, the Suir flows south through Loughmore, Thurles, Holycross, Golden and Knockgraffon. Merging with the River Aherlow at Kilmoyler and further on with the River Tar, it turns east at the Comeragh Mountains, forming the border between counties Waterford and Tipperary. It then passes through Cahir, Clonmel and Carrick-on-Suir before reaching Waterford. Near the Port of Waterford it meets the River Barrow at Cheekpoint to form a wide navigable estuary, capable of accommodating seagoing vessels up to 32,000 tons dwt. It exits to the sea between Dunmore East and Hook Head.

Together with the Nore and the Barrow, the river is one of the trio known as The Three Sisters.

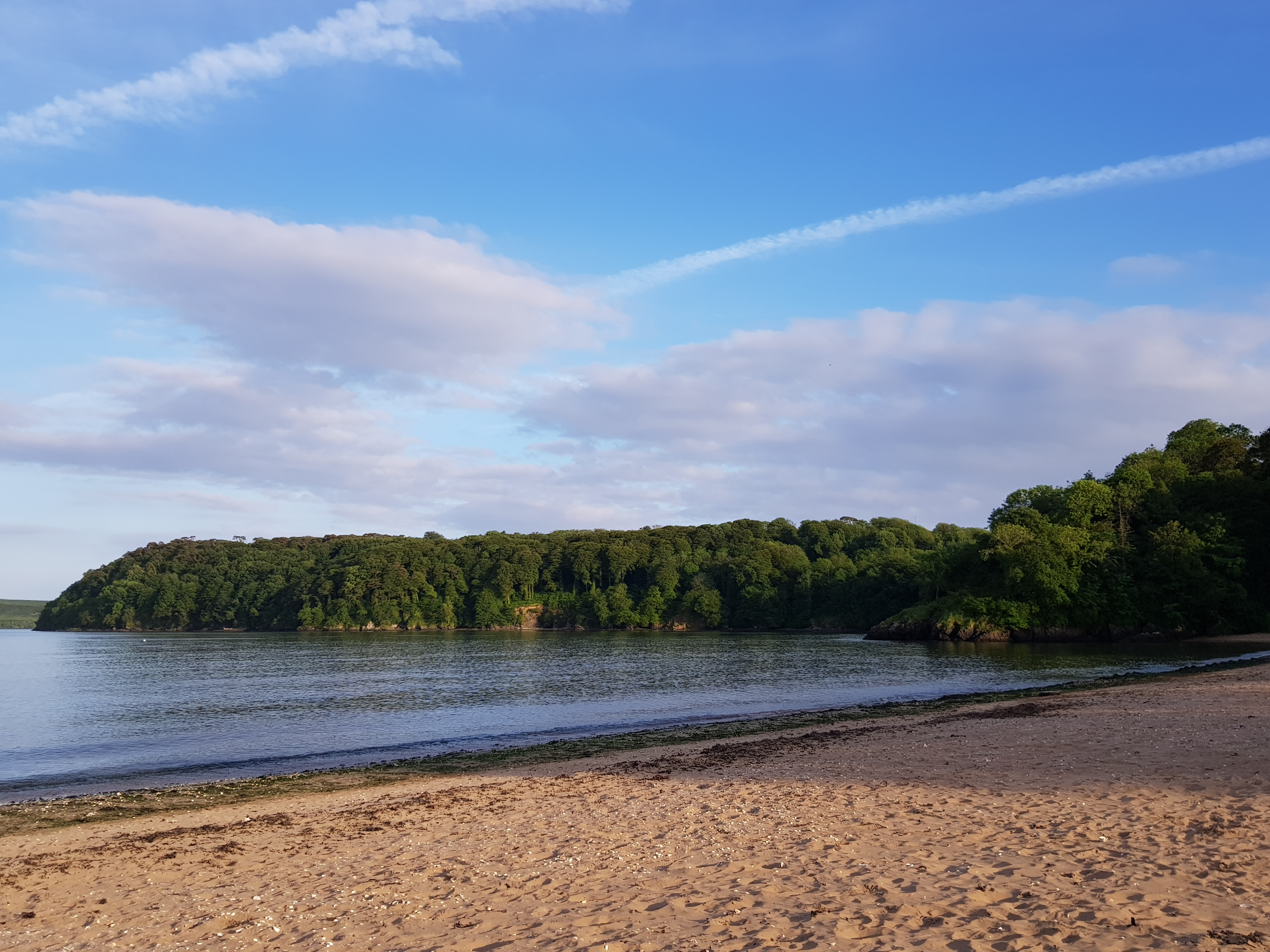
Woodstown Beach, County Waterford, along the Suir estuary

The Suir is known in Irish as Siúir and it is thought the present spelling in English with the u and i reversed is due to a mistake. Edmund Spenser (1552–1599) author of The Fairie Queene, in his writings during the Elizabethan age while domiciled in County Cork, referred to the "gentle Shure", probably an accurate spelling of the pronunciation of his time.

In the early years of the 21st century, the remains of a very large Viking settlement were found at a bend in the river at Woodstown, just upstream from Waterford.

In Clonmel, the Suir floods the local area after very heavy rainfalls falling in the up river catchment of 2,173 km^{2}. The Office of Public Works (OPW) completed and installed a Flood Forecasting System which was used to forecast flooding in January 2008 and January 2009, the flooding of January 2009 being a 1 in 5-year event. Phase 1 of the Clonmel Flood defence (1–100-year) which started in 2007 is scheduled for completion in late 2009 and phase two and three as one contract by 2011/2012. The flood defence consists of demountable barriers, walls and earth banks. The Gashouse Bridge, Coleville Road, Davis Road, the quays and the Old Bridge are generally the worst affected areas.

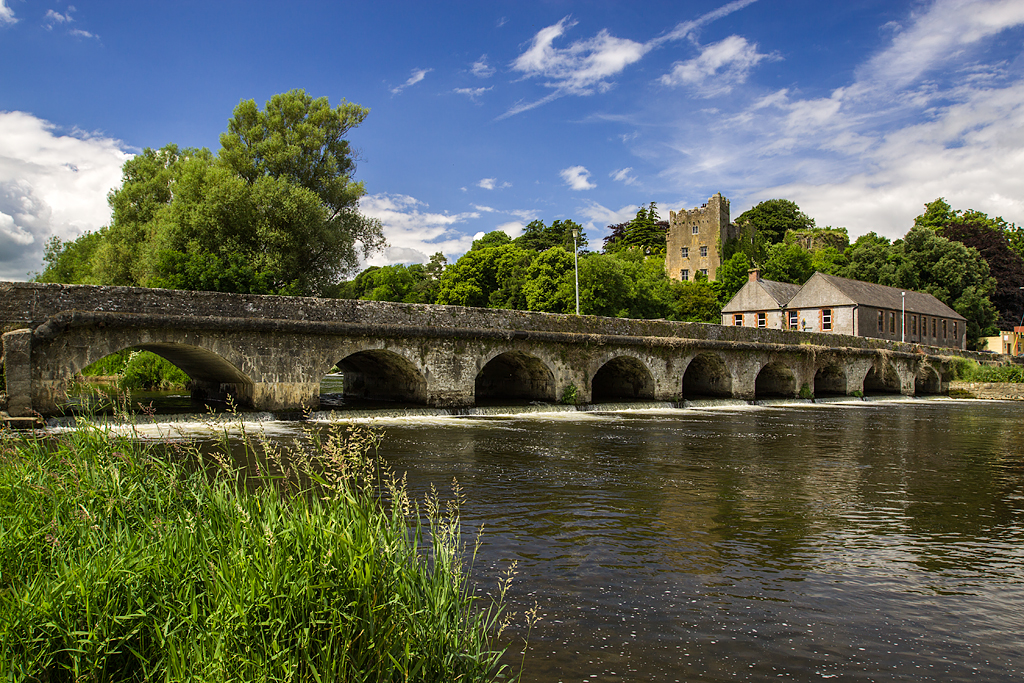
The Suir and Ardfinnan Castle

Carrick-on-Suir is tidal and has a 1–50-year flood defence. The Office of Public Works (OPW) now plan to install a 1–200-year flood defence where the Suir flows through Waterford city.

The flow of the Suir was advantageous to watermills, such as at Ardfinnan Woollen Mills where tweed was washed, dyed and exported around the world.

== See also ==
- Rivers of Ireland
