= Devil's Bit =

Mountain in County Tipperary, Ireland

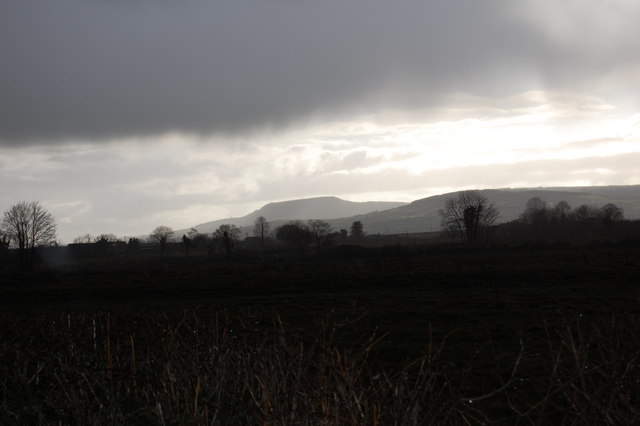
- Devil's Bit from the east

Highest point
- Elevation: 480 m (1,570 ft)
- Prominence: 344
- Listing: Marilyn

Naming
- Native name: Bearnán Éile

Geography
- Location within island of Ireland
- Location: County Tipperary, Ireland
- OSI/OSNI grid: S058744
- Topo map: OSi Discovery 59

The Devil's Bit or Devil's Bit Mountain (Irish: Bearnán Éile, meaning 'little gapped hill of Éile', historically anglicized as 'Barnane Ely') is a large hill in County Tipperary, Ireland, which rises to 480 metres (1,570 ft). It lies north-west of the town of Templemore. The mountain is usually climbed through the townland of Barnane. There is a car park at the base.

== History ==
The mountain was historically called Sliabh Aildiúin and Irish: Bearnán Éile, meaning 'little gapped hill of Éile', after the territory of Éile. According to local legend, the mountain got its current name because the devil took a bite out of it. There is a small gap in the mountain between one outcrop of rock (known as the Rock) and another small plateau. The legend says that the devil broke his teeth taking this bite and spat the Rock of Cashel from his mouth to where it now stands.

Historically, Devil's Bit was one of the hills around Ireland that were climbed as part of the Lughnasa festival.

The Book of Dimma was supposedly discovered in a cave on the mountain in 1789. It is an illuminated manuscript copy of the four Gospels and was written in the monastery of St. Cronan in Roscrea some time during the 8th century. According to legend, Cronan ordered his scribe Dimma to produce the manuscript before sunset on that day. He then used miraculous powers to ensure that the sun did not set for forty days, and Dimma spent all of this period completing the manuscript without feeling the need to eat or sleep. The manuscript disappeared following the dissolution of the monasteries in the 16th century. There is some debate about whether or not the manuscript was actually found on the Devil's Bit amid claims that it could not have survived without damage in an outdoor environment for over two centuries. The Book of Dimma is currently housed in the library of Trinity College Dublin.

The mountain was the scene of a mass anti-tithe meeting on 25 July 1832. The meeting was part of a wider campaign of resistance to the payment of tithes (one-tenth of the value of arable produce) to the Church of Ireland by the majority Catholic population. According to press reports of the time, over 50,000 people attended, many coming from as far away as County Galway, although the attendance would have been larger had there not been confusion about whether or not the meeting was cancelled. Although local folklore states that Daniel O' Connell attended the meeting, it is almost certain that he was not present as he was attending parliamentary debates in Westminster at the time. A semi-fictional account of the meeting was given by Samuel Lover in Legends and Stories of Ireland (1834), where he refers to a mock 'burial' of the tithes by local peasantry.

The tower on the approach to the summit is known as Carden's Folly. The Cardens were an Anglo-Irish aristocratic family who arrived in Ireland during the seventeenth century. They purchased estates in Templemore and Barnane and became the principal landlords in the area in subsequent centuries. The most notable Carden was undoubtedly John Rutter Carden (1811–1866), better known as 'Woodcock', so-called by irate tenants because he was as difficult to shoot as the bird of that name. As well as constructing the folly, he built a magnificent family home on the lower slopes of the mountain. Although the house was demolished in the early 20th century, the ruins of the walled garden can still be seen. In 1854, 'Woodcock' made a notorious attempt to kidnap a lady, Eleanor Arbuthnot, with whom he had become obsessed. A detailed history of the Carden family has been published by a descendant, Arthur Eustace Carden.

A cross was erected on the Rock in 1953–1954 in celebration of the 'Marian Year dedicated by the Roman Catholic Church. A committee was formed and planning of the work began in early 1953 and construction began in September of that year, it was constructed by the Duggan Brothers. The project manager was Stephen (Steedie) Grey of Templemore. Work was completed at a cost of approximately IR£2,000. The cross was officially blessed by the Archbishop of Cashel and Emly, Most Rev. Dr. Jeremiah Kinane, on Sunday, 22 August 1954. It stands 45 feet high and has a span of 25 feet. The base of 340 tons is 5 feet squared and 10 feet deep. All tools and materials for this construction project were carried to the Rock by hand. The cross is presently illuminated at night. Holy Mass is celebrated at the base of the Rock each year on Rock Sunday, which is the closest Sunday to the feast of St James (25 July). A statue of the Virgin Mary was erected in 1988 on the eastern side of the Rock.

A 1980 article in the journal Nature described the finding on the mountain of the earliest record of a fossil flora containing Cooksonia-type sporangia.

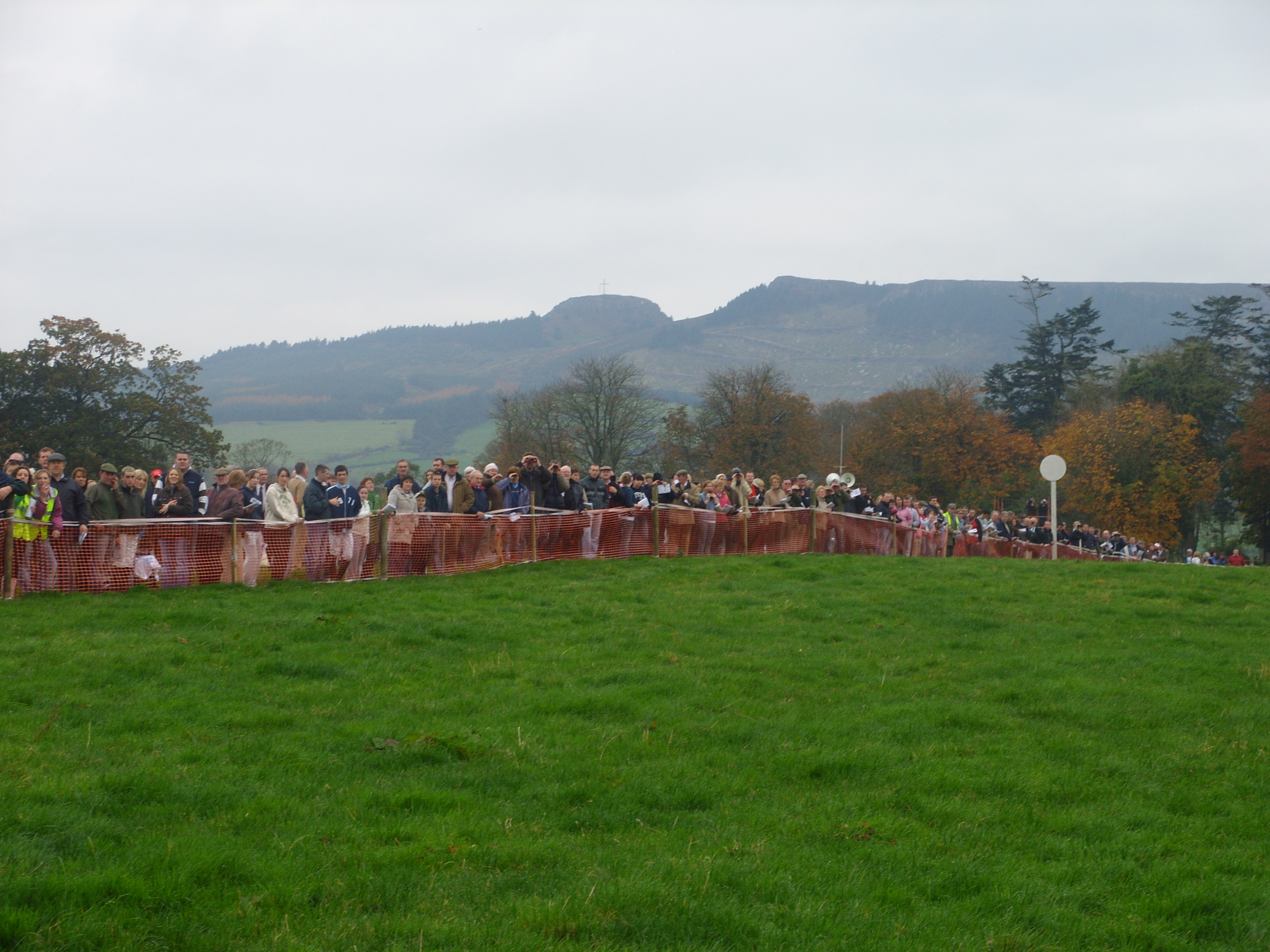
The Devil's Bit Mountain

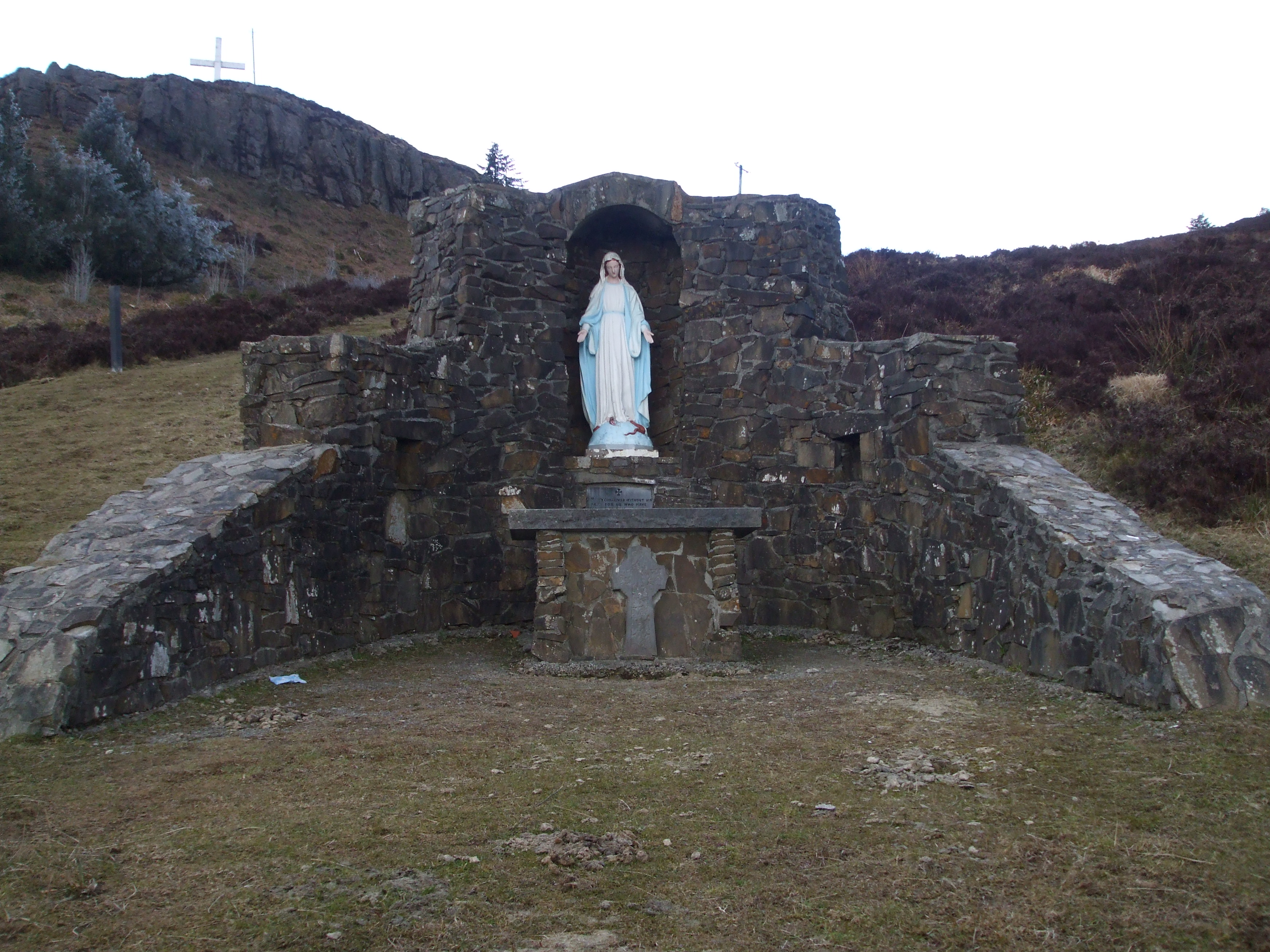
Statue of the Virgin Mary

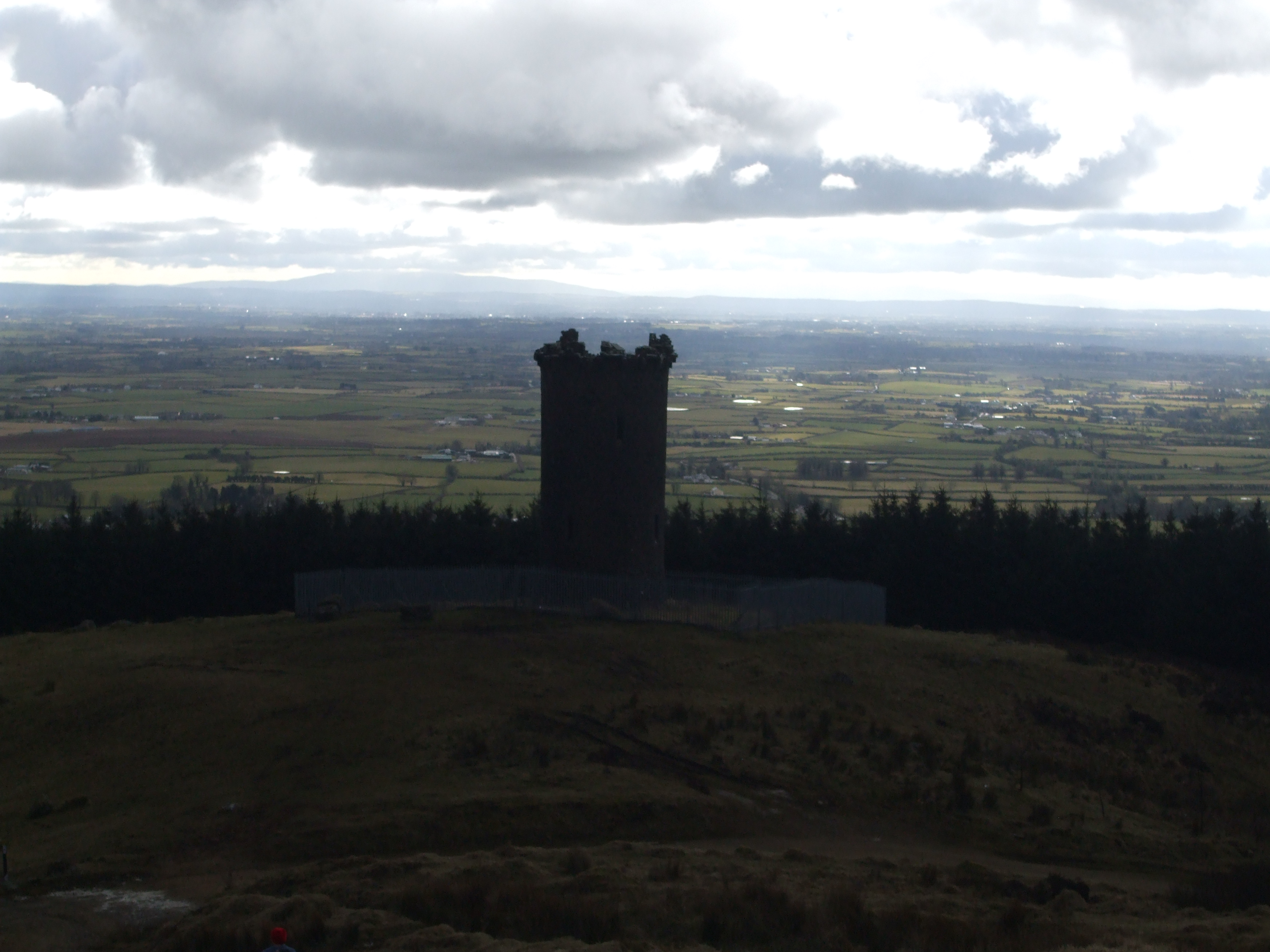
Carden's Folly

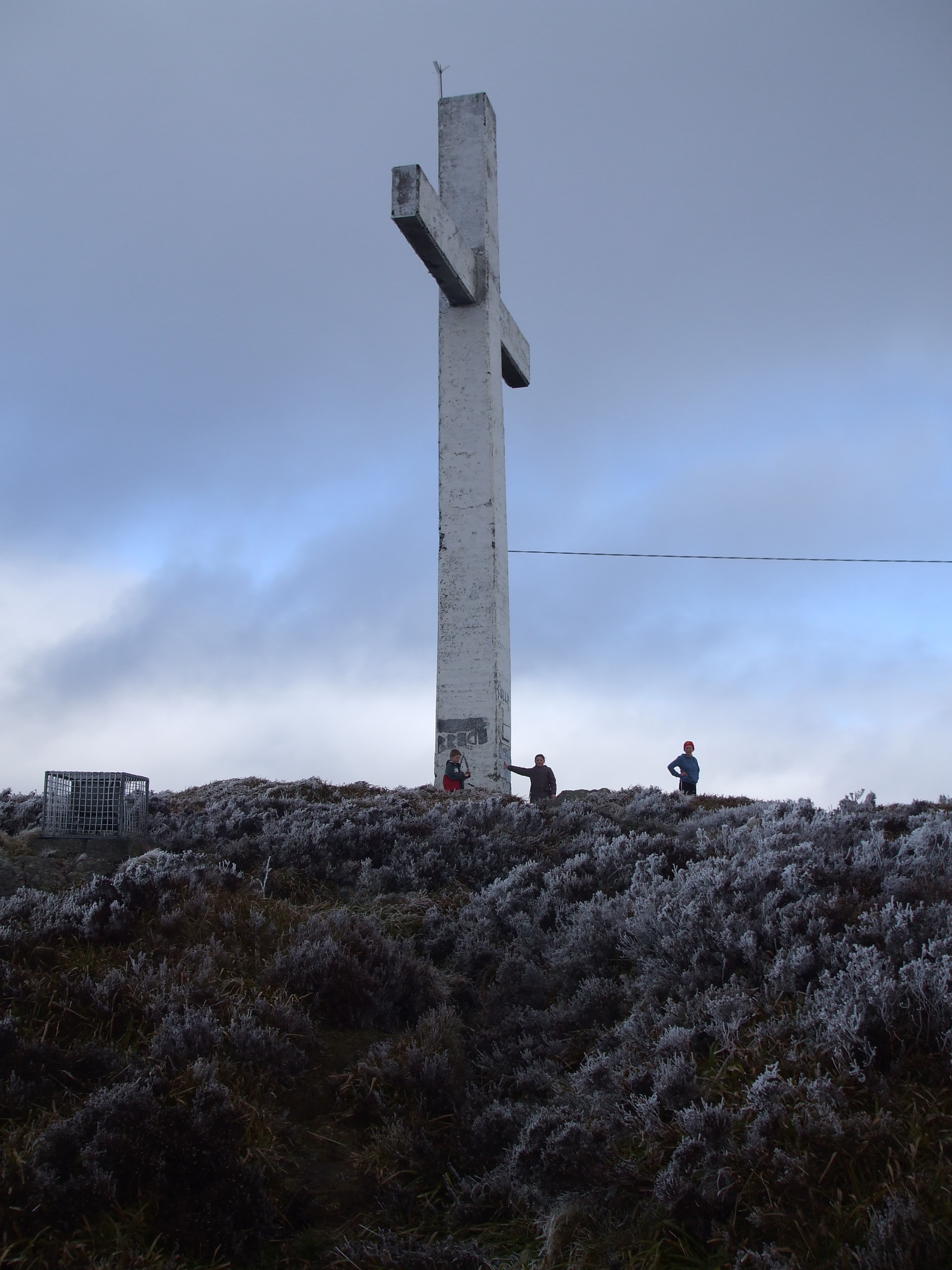
Cross on the summit

== Topography ==
The southwestern extremity of the Slieve Bloom range just touches Tipperary at Roscrea. The valley in which Roscrea stands separates this end of Slieve Bloom from the Devil's Bit range, which begins immediately south of the town and runs southwest. This mountain has a singular gap in its contour (very conspicuous from the railway), from which it was formerly called Barnane-Ely, i.e., the gapped mountain of Ely (the old territory in which it was situated), which is still the name of the parish. The other chief summits are Kilduff Mountain (1,462 feet; 445.6 m), Borrisnoe (1,471 feet; 448.4 m), and Benduff (1,399 feet; 426.4 m), all near Devil's Bit in a line to the northwest; and 4 miles (6.4 km) southwest of Devil's Bit, Knockanora (1,429 feet; 435.6 m) and Latteragh (1,257 feet; 383.1 m).

The Devil's Bit offers expansive views of the surrounding countryside. When the cross was erected, it was said that nine counties can be viewed from the summit – Tipperary itself, Clare, Cork, Galway, Kilkenny, Laois, Limerick, Offaly, and Waterford. There is doubt as to whether any part of County Cork is actually visible. One can see the Knockmealdown and Comeragh Mountains in Waterford, along with the Galtees, and, to the north-west, Lough Derg and the River Shannon.

The triangulation station which marks the highest point of the mountain is on the 'Long Rock' which lies to the east of the Gap. The Long Rock can be climbed if one passes through the Gap and follows the pathway to the right.

There is a military firing range on the western slopes of the mountain.
