= River Barrow =

Second-longest river in Ireland, one of the Three Sisters

Coordinates: 52°14′N 6°58′W

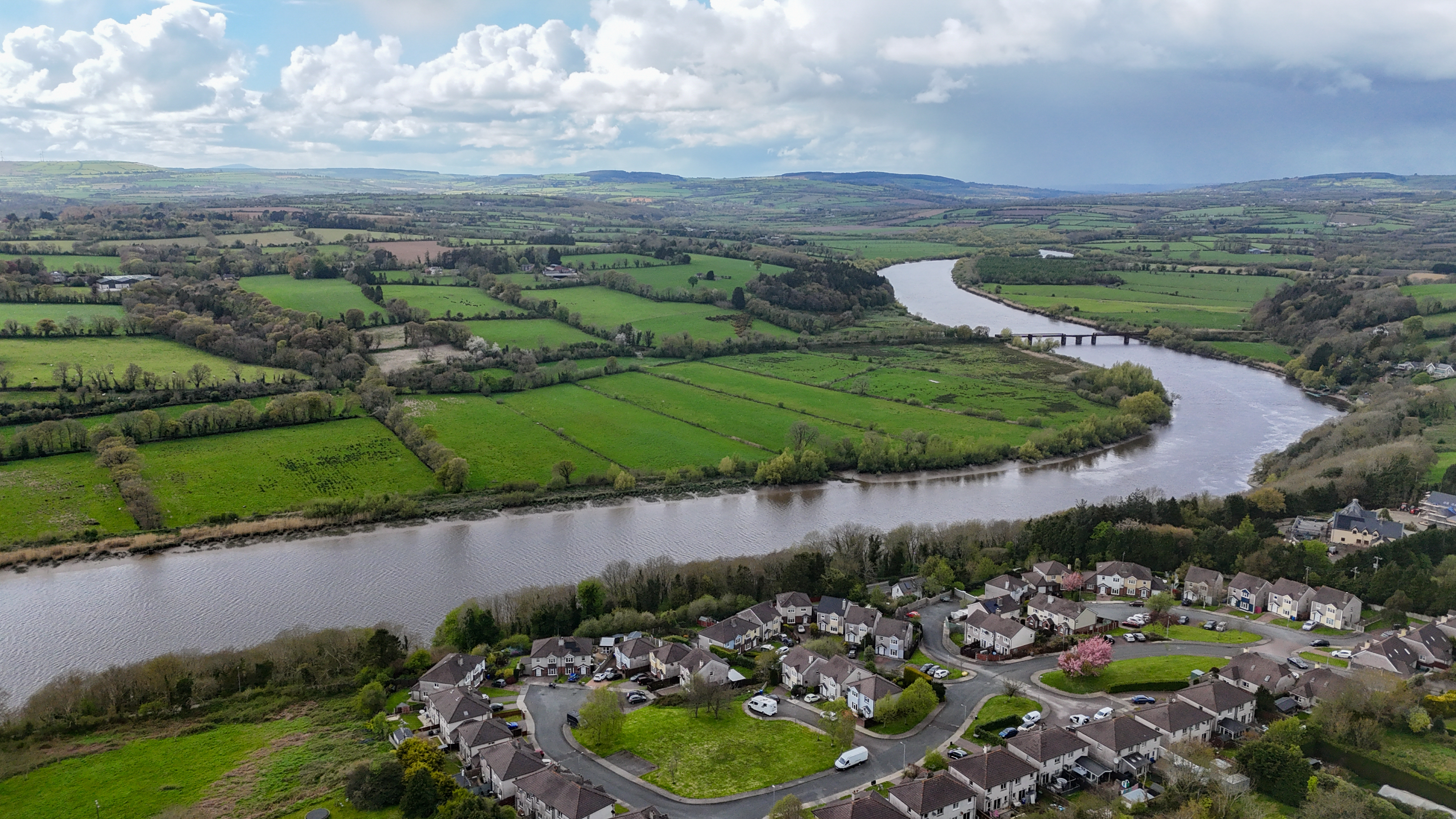
- River Barrow at New Ross

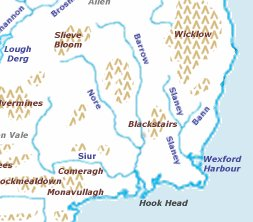
- River Barrow and nearby geography
- Etymology: Proto-Celtic *boru- ("boil", "bubble")
- Native name: An Bhearú (Irish)

Location
- Country: Ireland
- Counties: Laois, Kildare, Kilkenny, Carlow, Wexford, Waterford

Physical characteristics
- Source: Slieve Bloom Mountains
  - location: Glenbarrow, County Laois
  - elevation: 350 m (1,150 ft)
- Mouth: Celtic Sea
  - location: Waterford Harbour
- Length: 192 km (119 mi)
- Basin size: 3,067 km^{2} (1,184 sq mi) (See text)
- Discharge
  - average: 37.4 m^{3}/s (1,320 cu ft/s) (See text)

Basin features
- River system: Three Sisters
- Tributaries
  - left: Figile River, Finnery River, River Greese, Lerr River, Burren River, Mountain River, Pollmounty River
  - right: Owenass River, Madlin River, Ballyvalden River, Gowran River, River Nore, River Suir

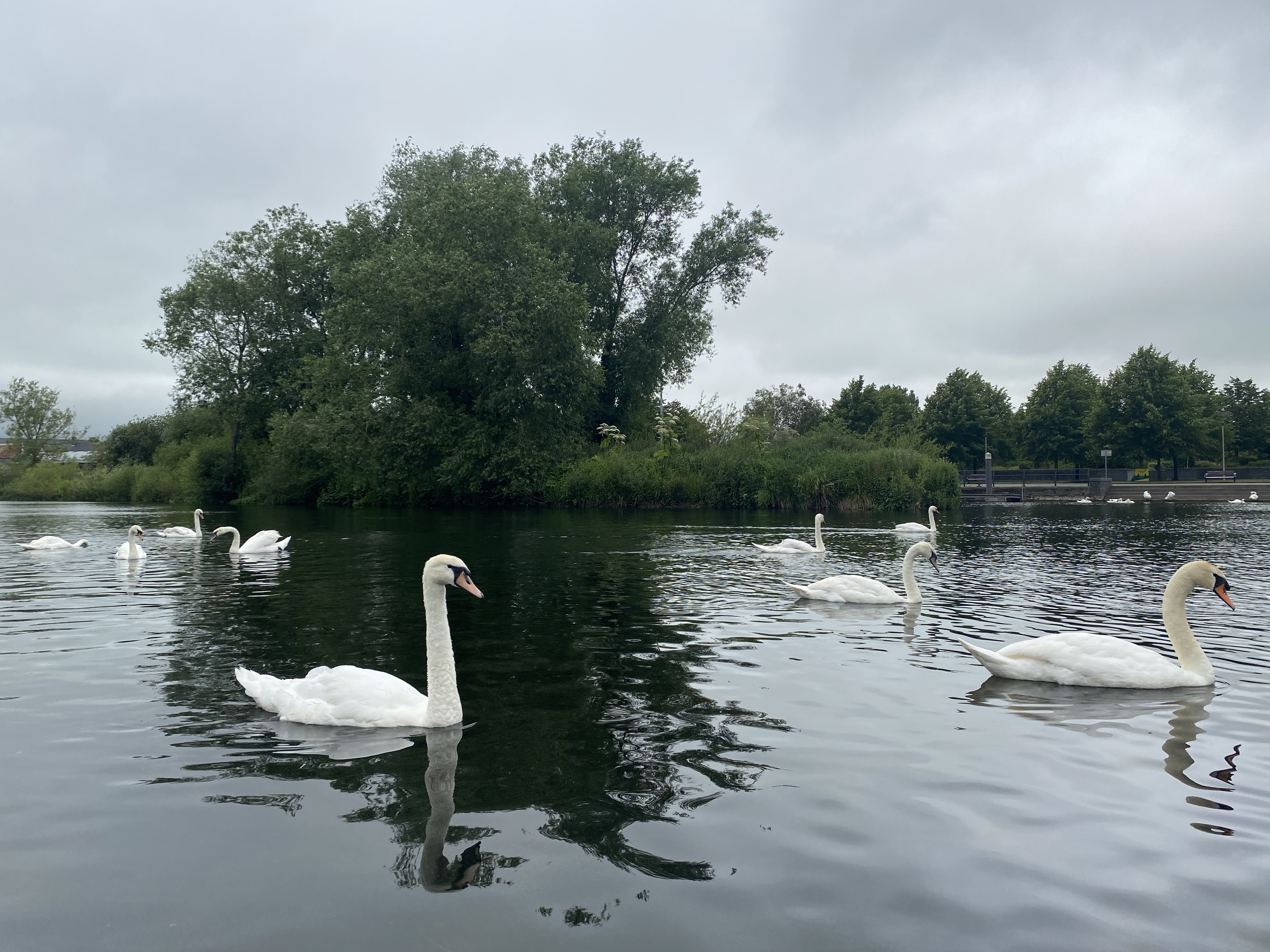
Mute swans on the River Barrow at Carlow

The Barrow (Irish: An Bhearú) is a river in Ireland. It is one of The Three Sisters, the other two being the River Suir and the River Nore. The Barrow is the longest of the three rivers and, at 192 km (120 mi), the second-longest river in Ireland, behind the River Shannon.

The catchment area of the Barrow is 3,067 km^{2} before the River Nore joins it a little over 20 km before its mouth. The river's long term average flow rate, again before it is joined by River Nore, is 37.4 cubic metres per second. At the merger with the River Nore, its catchment area is ca. 5,500 km^{2} and its discharge over 80 m^{3}/s.

== Course ==
The source of the Barrow is at Glenbarrow in the Slieve Bloom Mountains in County Laois.

Some towns that the Barrow passes through before Waterford are Portarlington, Monasterevin, Athy, Carlow/Graiguecullen, Bagenalstown, Goresbridge, Graiguenamanagh and New Ross.

The river forms a natural border between, on its right bank, counties Kilkenny and Waterford and, on its left bank, counties Carlow and Wexford.

== Name ==
The Irish hydronym Bearú has been derived from the Proto-Celtic *boru- ("boil, brew"), which would make it cognate with Borvo, the Celtic god of minerals and spring water. Variant spellings include Berbae (gen. ca. 800/830), Barowe (1522), and Barragh (1641). Ptolemy's Geography (2nd century AD) described a river called Βιργος (Birgu), which could be linked to the Proto-Indo-European *bʰergʰ- "to hide, to protect," referring to Waterford Harbour as a place of refuge.

The river's name is associated to the legendary deeds of Dian Cecht, who slew three serpents found in the heart of The Morrígan's infant son and threw them into the Barrow, thus causing it to boil.

Sloighedh la Domhnall ua Néill co Laighnibh co ros-indir o Bherbha siar go fairrge, & do-bert bóromha mhór lais, & do-rad forbhais for Ghallaibh, & for Laighnibh co cenn da mhíos. As don chur-sin torchair Fionn, mac Goirmghiolla, Dunghal mac Dúnghaile I Riagáin, & Ronán, mac Bruadair, mic Duibhgiolla, & aroile saor-chlanna do Laighnibh amaille friu.

Translation:

An army was led by Domnall ua Néill into Leinster; and he plundered from the Berbha eastwards to the sea; and he carried off a great prey of cattle; and he laid siege to the Norsemen and the Leinstermen for two months. On this occasion were slain Fionn, son of Goirmghilla; Dunghal, son of Dunghal Ua Riagain; Ronan, son of Bruadar, son of Duibhghilla, and other nobles of the Leinstermen along with them.

== History ==
The Barrow historically provided a natural boundary between the kingdoms of Laigin on the eastern shore and Osraige on the western shore.

There was a proverb quoted by Sir John Davies that "whoso lives by west of the Barrow, lives west of the law".

== Barrow navigation ==
The River Barrow forms a major part of Ireland's inland waterways network, providing an inland link between the port of Waterford and the Grand Canal, which in turn connects Dublin to the River Shannon. There are three sections to the navigation:

- The tidal River Barrow, which together with the tidal reaches of its tributaries, the Suir and the Nore, constitute 88 km (55 mi) of tidal river navigation.
- The non-tidal river navigation featuring 23 locks, continuing 66 km (41 miles) inland from the tidal limit of the Barrow at St Mullin's to Athy.
- The Barrow Line of the Grand Canal connects to the river at Athy and continues northwards a further 45 km (28 mi) with 9 locks, connecting to the mainline of the Grand Canal at Lowtown, and so to Dublin.

== Recreation ==
Parts of the Barrow attract kayakers and swimmers, primarily in the summer months. The Barrow Way is a 120 kilometre long-distance walk along the river, one of Ireland's National Waymarked Trails. The trail follows the Barrow Line, and then along the towpaths along the non-tidal part of the river, ending in St. Mullins.

== See also ==
- Rivers of Ireland
- List of rivers of Ireland
- The Three Sisters
