= Carrignamuck =

- townland

Irish transcription(s)
  - Derivation: Carraig na Muc
  - Meaning: Rock of the pigs
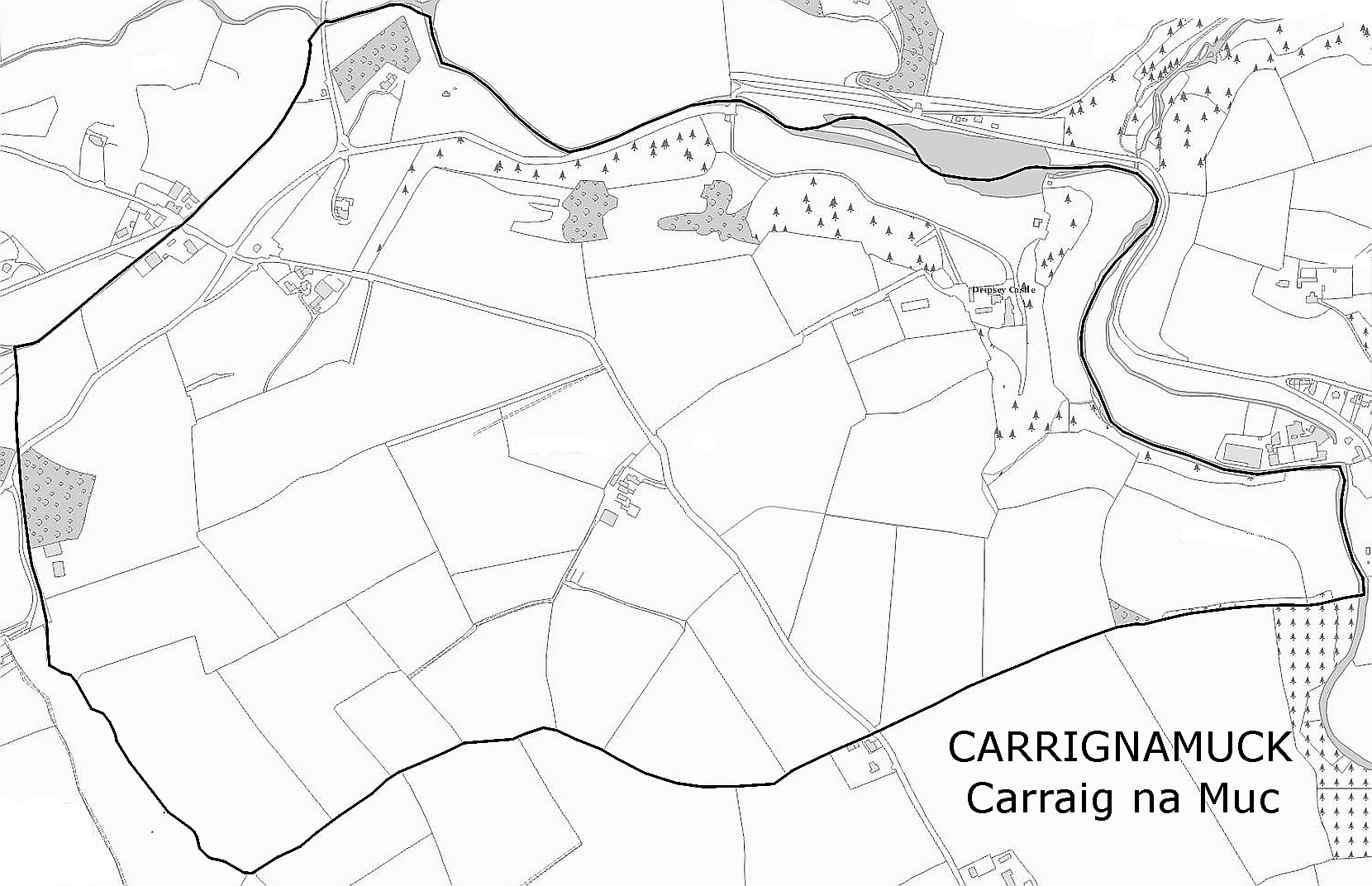

- Carrignamuck shown within Ireland
- Coordinates: 51°55′31″N 8°45′46″W
- Irish grid ref: W475750
- Country: Ireland
- County: County Cork
- Barony: Muskerry East
- Civil parish: Magourney
- First recorded: c. 1573
- Settlements: Coachford, Dripsey

Government
  - Council: Cork County Council
  - Ward: Blarney-Macroom EA

Area
  - Total: 147.21 ha (363.8 acres)

Carrignamuck (from Irish Carraig na Muc 'Rock of the pigs') is a townland within the civil parish of Magourney and catholic parish of Aghabullogue, County Cork, Ireland. It is 363.76 acres in size, situate north-east of Coachford village, and north-west of Dripsey village.

One of the earliest references to Carrignamuck is contained within an Elizabethan fiant of 1573, when a pardon was granted to Donald m'Teig M'Cartie of Carignymucke. This is likely to have been Donyll McTeige MacCarthy (tanist of Muskerry and brother of Sir Cormac McTeige MacCarthy of Blarney Castle) who resided at Carrignamuck Tower House. In a sketch map dated c. 1590 and titled the description of Muskery, the area is described as Carrigomuck. The OS name book (c. 1840), in addition to mentioning the 'ruins, house and demesne of Dripsey Castle' describes Carraig na Muc as 'bounded on the north and east by the Dripsey River, on the south by Kilgobinet and Dereen townlands and in the Barony of East Muskerry', and mainly being 'under cultivation'.

The Down Survey Maps (1656-8) refer to it as Carrickmuck (Barony of Muskerry Map) and Carrignemucke (Parish Map). The accompanying terrier states that 'on Carrignamucke stands a Castle and a Mill' naming the proprietor as Cormack McCallaghane Carthy who held 574 acres. Smith in 1774 refers to 'the castle of Carignamuck'.

By the early nineteenth century, the townland was commonly named as Carrignamuck, with Lewis in 1837 referring to 'the ancient castle of Carrignamuck' and both the Ordnance Survey name book (c. 1840) and the OS 1842 surveyed map use the same name.

The majority of sources, such as O'Murchú (1991) contend Carrignamuck derives from Carraig na Muc meaning 'rock of the pigs'. O'Donoghue (1986) holds Carrig na Muc as deriving its name 'from a pass in the nearby Dripsey River where it was customary to kill pigs which provided supplies of bacon for the castle ... while the Lord of Muskerry lived at Blarney, his Tanist always held Carrignamuck'. Another version is that 'the proper name of Carrignamuck was Carrigcormac ... and that Carrignamuck Tower House was so called after Cormac Laidher McCarthy, the builder of Blarney Castle'. Milner (1975) also subscribes to this alternative view.

Townland population
Year	Pop.
1841	127
1851	74
1861	64
1871	45
1881	62
1891	77
1901	52
1911	37
2011	24

Earlier versions of townland name
Year	Form
1573	Carignymucke (Elizabethan Fiant)
c. 1590	Carrigomuck (Sketch map of Muskery)
1656-8	Carrickmuck/Carrignemucke/Carrignamucke (Down Survey)
1774	Carignamuck (Smith)
1811	Carnamuck (Bath's Grand Jury map)
1837	Carrignamuck (Lewis)

== See also ==
- Dripsey Castle, Carrignamuck
- Dripsey Castle Bridge
- Trafalgar Monument, Carrignamuck
- Colthurst's Bridge
