= Trafalgar Monument, Carrignamuck =

Trafalgar Monument
- Location within island of Ireland
- 51°55′47″N 8°46′1″W
- Type: Ornamental tower
- Location: Carrignamuck, County Cork, Ireland

History
- Built: c. 1820
- Built by: Cdr. Nicholas Colthurst

Site notes
- Condition: Ruined
- Owner: Private
- Public access: No

The Trafalgar Monument is an ornamental tower (or folly) in Carrignamuck townland, 2.8 km (1.7 mi) north of Coachford village, County Cork, Ireland. It was built by Nicholas Colthurst, who served during the Napoleonic Wars, and was a midshipman aboard HMS Prince during the Battle of Trafalgar. Colthurst continued to serve in the Royal Navy until 1841, retiring with the rank of commander. Parliamentary returns give his date of entry into the Royal Navy as 14 April 1797, promotion to lieutenant followed on 19 September 1806, and his actual date of commission as a retired commander is given as 29 January 1841.

This tower is depicted as a rectangular structure in the 1841 and 1901 surveyed OS maps. The Irish Tourist Association survey of 1944 describes it as a plain, ivy-covered, rectangular structure, which once appeared to have a stone roof. It goes on to state that it was erected by 'Capt. Colthurst of the British Navy' to commemorate the victory at the Battle of Trafalgar.

The Archaeological Inventory of County Cork describes it as a mid/late nineteenth century roofless square tower, one storey in height, with a high parapet wall, located on a man-made mound, and overlooking both the Dripsey River. The tower is said to contain tall stone-arched windows and a fireplace. Local information erroneously asserts that it was built to commemorate the death of a Colthurst at the Battle of Trafalgar.

The National Inventory of Architectural Heritage (NIAH) describes it as a ruinous square-plan folly tower, built c.1820, with rubble stone walls and an ogee-headed opening to each elevation. The NIAH entry, which associates the folly with nearby Beechmount House, also erroneously states that it was built by the Colthurst family to commemorate the death of a family member at the Battle of Trafalgar.

The tower is not accessible to the public and is located on private property.

== See also ==
- Dripsey Castle, Carrignamuck
- Carrignamuck Tower House
- Dripsey Castle Bridge
- Colthurst's Bridge
