= Aghavrin =

- townland

Irish transcription(s)
  - Derivation: Achadh Bhroin, Achadh Bhrain
  - Meaning: "Byrne's, Burns' or Bron's field"
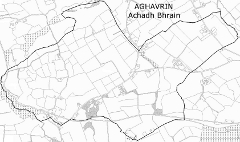

- Aghavrin shown within Ireland
- Coordinates: 51°55′55″N 8°48′54″W
- Irish grid ref: W439758
- Country: Ireland
- County: County Cork
- Barony: Muskerry East
- Civil parish: Aghabullogue
- Settlements: Aghabullogue, Coachford

Government
  - Council: Cork County Council
  - Ward: Blarney-Macroom EA

Area
  - Total: 270.05 ha (667.3 acres)

Aghavrin (from Irish Achadh Bhroin 'Byrne's, Burns' or Bron's field') is a townland within both the civil parish and Catholic parish of Aghabullogue, County Cork, Ireland. It is approximately 667.3 acres (2.7 km^{2}) in size, situated south-west of Aghabullogue village, and north-west of Coachford village.

== Name and location ==
The townland is referred to as 'Aghrin' in the Down Survey Maps (1656-1658), Aghawrinmore and Aghawrinbeg are listed as sub-denominations, and the proprietor is listed as Lord Muskry (Muskerry). The Ordnance Survey name book (c. 1840) gives an alternate Irish name of Ath a buirinn to the townland and also lists Ahavrinbeg and Ahavrinmore as sub-denominations. It describes the townland as the property of John Bowin (Bowen), Esq. of Oak Grove, and John Bowin Gumbleton, Esq. Its condition was said to be of mixed quality, principally cultivated, but containing some boggy land, rocks and furze.

The townland was said to have several waterfalls to the south-west, and places included Bowing's (Bowen's) Pond, Good's Pond, Poulahourane (Waterfall), Poulanassig (Waterfall), Ahavrinmore, Ahavrieg, Ahavringrove, Ahavrin Castle (Crooke's Castle), Carrigacubbeen and Clashagorrave River. O'Donoghue (1986) holds Achadh Bhroin to mean Bron's field, and that Bron was father of Maolmuadh, king of Munster in 959, and grandfather of Cian.

O'Murchú (1991) holds upon local authority that Achadh Bhroin may refer to Byrne's or Burns' field. The Placenames Database of Ireland gives an alternate Irish name of Achadh Bhrain to the townland.

== Places of interest ==
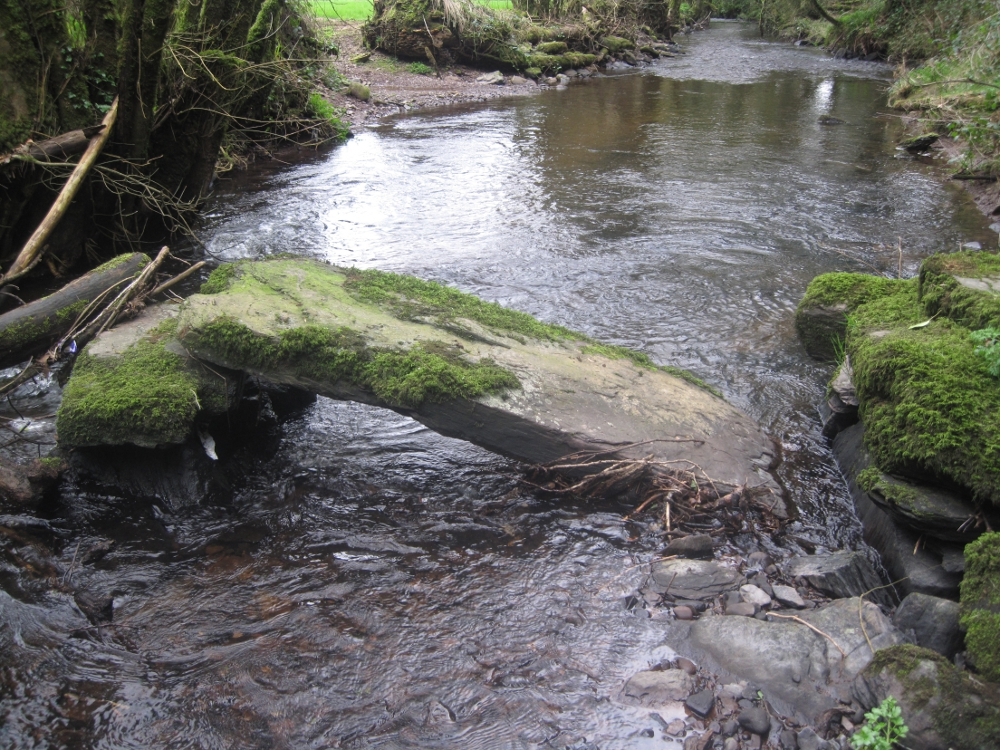
A ruined clapper bridge within Mullinhassig Wood

Places of note within the townland include Mullinhassig Wood, a forested amenity which is managed by Coillte and contains a number of waterfalls.

Crooke's Castle, also known as the Admiral’s Folly or Agharria Castle, is a 19th century ornamental tower built on Carrigaknubber Rock by the former owners of Aghavrin House. It is included on the Record of Protected Structures maintained by Cork County Council.

To the south and at the foot of Carrigaknubber Rock is a Mass rock which is formed by a 'sort of ledge or stone altar'. According to P.J. Hartnett, writing in 1939, it was used for the celebration of Catholic religious services in Penal times.

== Demographics ==
As of the 2011 census, Aghavrin townland had a population of 116 people. Historical census records include:

Townland population
Year	Pop.
1841	346
1851	214
1861	165
1871	220
1881	174
1891	118
1901	92
1911	99

Earlier versions of townland name
Year	Form
1602-25	Aghowryn more & Aghowryeg (Inq. temp Jac I)
1656-8	Aghrin/Aghawrinmore & beg (Down Survey)
1784	Ahavrin
1811	Aghaburrin (Bath's Grand Jury map)
1814	Ahavrin (Crook's map)
1840	Ahavrin/Aghavrin

== See also ==
- St Olan's, Aghavrin
