= Clonmoyle =

Clonmoyle may refer to several townlands in Ireland, including:

- Clonmoyle East, a townland within Aghabullogue parish, County Cork, Ireland
- Clonmoyle West, a townland within Aghabullogue parish, County Cork, Ireland

== Other ==
- Clonmoyle Mill, watermill in Clonmoyle East
