= Leader's Aqueduct =

Aqueduct in County Cork, Ireland

- Leader's Folly
- Location within island of Ireland
- 51°56′24″N 8°46′32″W
- Type: Aqueduct
- Location: Clonmoyle East/Knockanenagark, County Cork, Ireland

History
- Built: c. 1860
- Built by: Henry Leader

Site notes
- Condition: Ruined
- Owner: Private
- Public access: No

Leader's Aqueduct is situated 4 km (2.5 mi) east of Aghabullogue village, and 4.3 km (2.7 mi) north of Coachford village. It is located at the meeting point of the townlands of Clonmoyle East (which lies within the civil parish and Catholic parish of Aghabullogue) and Knockanenagark (which lies within the civil parish of Magourney and Catholic parish of Aghabullogue).

The aqueduct was constructed by Henry Leader of nearby Clonmoyle House, with the intention of conveying water, for irrigation purposes, over a glen and the Dripsey River, to the Clonmoyle area. The venture was ultimately unsuccessful, leading to the structure becoming known as 'Leader's Folly'.

The Irish Tourist Association survey of 1944 states that it consisted of twelve piers, standing in line across a deep valley, the highest being 85 feet in height, and with some piers having since been dismantled for building material. The piers were said to have been erected c. 1860 to support a water chute, with water being piped for some 2 miles, and fed into the chute. The aqueduct was said to have carried water but once. The survey goes on to state that Leader was a philanthropic individual, whose experiments were often mainly intended to provide employment locally. Having been dissatisfied with progress, he is said to have engaged direct labour, employing local labourers and boys. One of these youths, disguised as an adult, was said to have received full pay, leading to other youths subsequently acting likewise and receiving full pay. This particular scheme and others were said to have been financed by Leader mortgaging his property, and that the Bank were the loser after his death, following discovery of imperfect title.

Milner (1975) advises that the aqueduct was not used. The reality is that it was operational, but not satisfactorily for the purposes intended. By the early twentieth century, the structure was depicted as an 'Aqueduct (in ruins)'.

== See also ==
- Clonmoyle Mill
- Luskin's Bridge
