= Colthurst's Bridge =

Bridge in County Cork, Ireland

- Location within island of Ireland
- 51°55′50.3″N 8°46′11″W
- Type: Bridge
- Location: Carrignamuck/Clonmoyle East/Peake, County Cork, Ireland

Site notes
- Public access: Yes

Colthurst's Bridge is situated 2.9 km (1.8 mi) north of Coachford village in County Cork, Ireland, 3.7 km (2.3 mi) east of Aghabullogue village, and is depicted on both the 1841 and 1901 surveyed OS maps. The bridge is located at the meeting point of the townlands of Carrignamuck, Clonmoyle East and Peake, the civil parishes of Aghabullogue and Magourney, and lies within the Catholic parish of Aghabullogue.

The Ordnance Survey name book (c. 1840), refers to it as a bridge with four arches over the Delehinagh River, and named Coulthurst's Bridge, as it was 12 chains (0.24 km (0.15 mi)) south-west of Mr Coulthurst's property. The Delehinagh River meets with the Dripsey River a short distance from the bridge.

The Archaeological Inventory of County Cork describes it as a road bridge with three arches, varying in shape and width, but generally semicircular. The bridge was said to possess dressed sandstone voussoirs, corbels on its piers which supported arch-centring during construction, and low pointed breakwaters on its upstream side. Pointed arches were an important feature of later Gothic Revival architecture, and said to be also present at Colthurst's Bridge.

== See also ==
- Dripsey Castle, Carrignamuck
- Carrignamuck Tower House
- Dripsey Castle Bridge
- Trafalgar Monument, Carrignamuck
