= Carhoo Lower =

- townland

Irish transcription(s)
  - Derivation: An Cheathrú Íochtarach
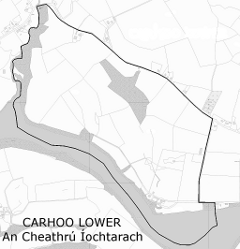

- Carhoo Lower shown within Ireland
- Coordinates: 51°54′34″N 8°49′2″W
- Irish grid ref: W438733
- Country: Ireland
- County: County Cork
- Barony: Muskerry East
- Civil parish: Magourney
- First recorded: c. 1590
- Settlements: Coachford

Government
  - Council: Cork County Council
  - Ward: Blarney-Macroom EA

Area
  - Total: 115.14 ha (284.5 acres)

Carhoo Lower (from Irish An Cheathrú Íochtarach) is a townland within the civil parish of Magourney and catholic parish of Aghabullogue, County Cork, Ireland. It is 284.5 acres in size, and west of Coachford village.

Carhoo firstly appears c. 1590 as 'Carown' in a sketch map The description of Muskery, retained as part of the Dartmouth Map Collection, at the National Maritime Museum, Greenwich. In the Down Survey Maps (1656-8), it is referred to as 'Carrow' and 'Carrooe', and the accompanying terrier lists Thomas and Edmund Coppinger as proprietors by way of mortgage. The Ordnance Survey name book (c. 1840) describes Carhoo Lower as bounded on the north and east by Carhoo Upper and Leemount townlands, with a large portion being the Carhue demesne and the remainder mainly pasture. Various name versions are given, such as 'Carhoo' and 'Carhue', and an Irish version as Ceathramha (meaning quarter). O'Murchú (1991) holds Ceathrú as meaning a quarter, in this instance a measurement of land, such as a townland or ploughland, and being a smaller division than a tuath or triocha céad. The Placenames Database of Ireland gives the townland an Irish name of An Cheathrú Íochtarach, with Ceathrú meaning a quarterland.

At the south-east end of the townland, is said to exist Poul Leather, a hollow within the River Lee, renowned for both its depth and treacherous current.

Townland population
Year	Pop.
1841	56
1851	36
1861	36
1871	55
1881	69
1891	32
1901	23
1911	14

Earlier versions of townland name
Year	Form
c. 1590	Carown (Sketch map of Muskery)
1656-8	Carrow/Carrooe (Down Survey)
1811	Carhue (Bath's Grand Jury map)
1840	Carhue/Carhoo (OS name book)

== Townland sites/items of interest ==
- Carhue House
- Glashagarriff Bridge
