= Aghavrin House =

Country house in County Cork, Ireland

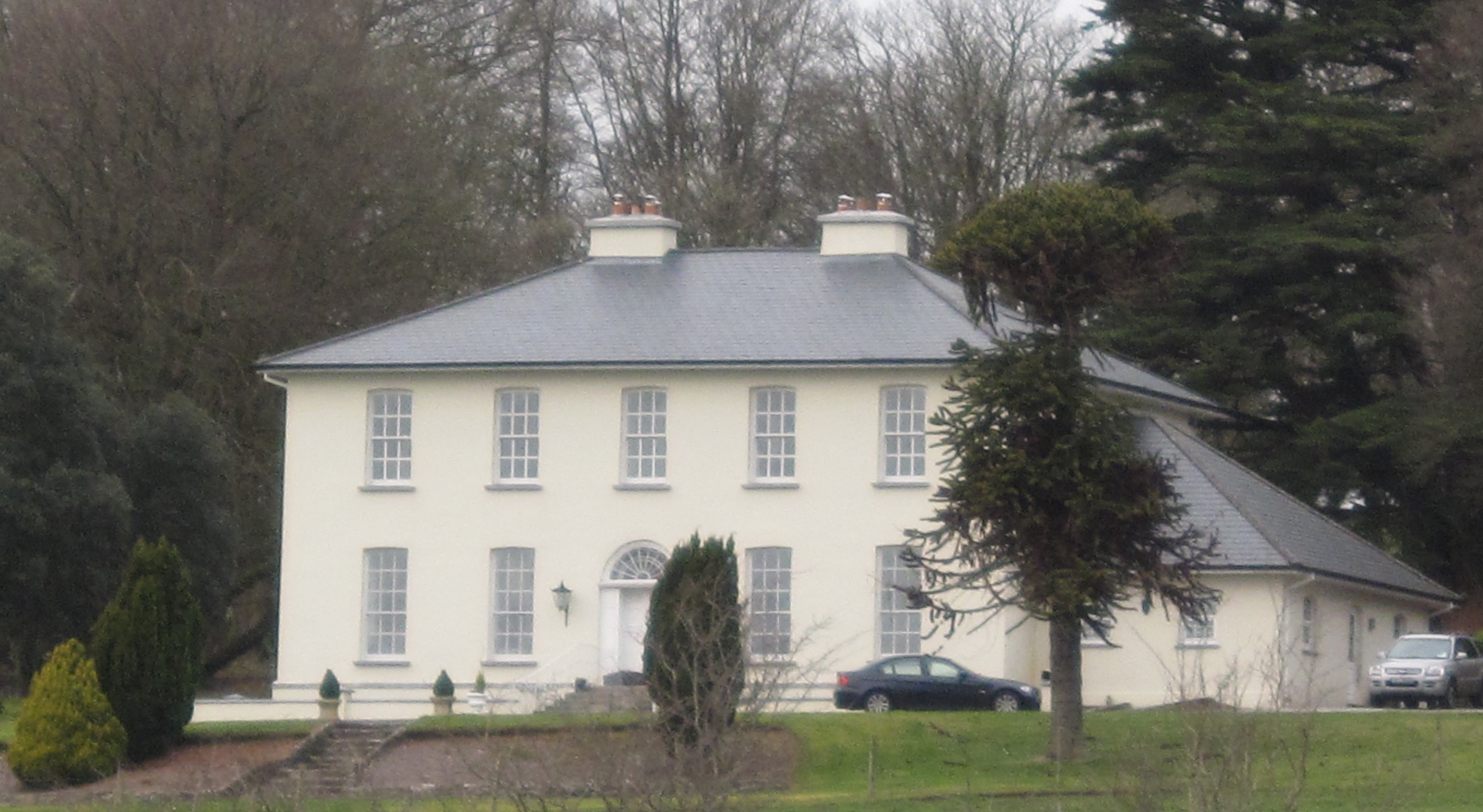
- Front façade of Aghavrin House

- Location within island of Ireland
- 51°55′44.98″N 8°48′53.56″W
- Type: Country house
- Location: Aghavrin, County Cork, Ireland

History
- Built: c. 1810

Site notes
- Owner: Private
- Public access: No

Aghavrin House is a country house in the townland of Aghavrin, situated 4.8 km (3.0 mi) north-west of Coachford village in County Cork, Ireland. The 'big house' and demesne were dominant features in the rural landscape of Ireland throughout the 18th and 19th centuries and Aghavrin House is one of several such houses situated along the valley of the River Lee and its tributaries.

The National Inventory of Architectural Heritage describes it as built c. 1810, being a five-bay, two-storey over basement house, and having symmetrical chimneystacks, elegant proportions, tall windows, a centralised arched doorcase and limestone perron (staircase). A gate lodge is indicated on the 1841 surveyed OS map at the roadside entrance to Aghavrin House, but no longer appears to exist. A summer house is indicated on the 1901 surveyed OS map, as a garden feature within the grounds, and still exists as a ruined semi-circular unroofed ivy-clad stone structure.

It was once the residence of the Crooke family. Lewis's Topographical Dictionary of Ireland (1837) describes the demesne of Ahavrin as small but well planted, and refers to 'Capt. T. E. Crooke' of 'Ahavrin House'. The tithe applotment book for the parish of Aghabullogue records 'Thomas Crook Esq.' of 'Ahavren' as occupying c.130 acres.

The mid-nineteenth century Primary Valuation of Ireland (Griffith's Valuation) records William Crooke as occupying c. 83 acres in Aghavrin townland, which consisted of a 'house, offices, gate lodge and land', with the lessor being John B. Gumbleton. There is also reference to a William Crooke occupying c.20 acres of land, with the lessor being John Bowen. The Ordnance Survey name book (c. 1840) describes Aghavrin townland as the property of John Bowin, Esq. of Oak Grove, and John Bowin Gumbleton, Esq. Its condition was said to be of mixed quality, principally cultivated, but containing some boggy land, rocks and furze. To the south of Aghavrin House is Crooke's Castle, a 19th-century folly constructed by Thomas Epinetus Crooke.

The Irish Tourist Association survey of 1944 describes Aghavrin House as the residence of Mrs Scott (maiden name Crooke) and that her family had built the property. It also notes that, during the War of Independence, IRA members had billeted themselves on the premises without invitation from the owner.

During the 20th century, the property became the residence of Brigadier Michael John Cahill OBE, who died in 1968 and is interred at Christchurch graveyard, Coachford. Today, it remains a private residence, and is not accessible to the public.

== See also ==
- St Olan's, Aghavrin
- Mullinhassig Wood
