= St Olan's, Aghavrin =

- Location within island of Ireland
- Alternative names: St Olan's Rectory

General information
- Type: House
- Location: Aghavrin, County Cork, Ireland
- Coordinates: 51°55′41.56″N 8°49′10.93″W
- Completed: c. 1840
- Owner: Private residence

St Olan's is a residence in Aghavrin townland, 4.2 km (2.6 mi) north-west of Coachford village in County Cork, Ireland.

Lewis's Topographical Dictionary of Ireland (1837) states a glebe of 30 acres was purchased at Aghavrin by the Board of First Fruits, but the rector did not take possession, as the annual rental was too high. The Ordnance Survey name book (c. 1840) describes the 'Glebe of Aghavrin' as the property of Captain Crooke, being good ground with some plantation, and the remainder under cultivation. The 1842 surveyed OS map depicts St Olan's Rectory, with the surrounding grounds and glebe clearly shown.

By the mid-nineteenth century, the Primary Valuation of Ireland (Griffith's Valuation) records Reverend William Welland as occupying c. 30 acres in Aghavrin townland, which consisted of a 'house, offices, land and glebe', with the lessor being William Crooke of Aghavrin House. Reverend Welland also occupied c. 5 acres of plantation land, with the lessor again being William Crooke. The 1901 surveyed OS map indicates a name change to 'St Olan's', with the grounds of the property still clearly identifiable.

The Irish Tourist Association survey of 1944 refers to 'St Olan's House, Aghavrin', the residence of Mr Devlin, Area Engineer of Cork County Council. The erection date of the property is given as c. 1840, as a 'Protestant Rectory', and completed c. 1890.

It remains a private residence, and is not accessible to the public.

== See also ==
- Crooke's Castle, Aghavrin
