= Ballinadihy Bridge =

Bridge in County Cork, Ireland

- Coordinates: 51°56′0″N 8°47′19″W
- Locale: Clonmoyle West/Peake, County Cork, Ireland

Ballinadihy Bridge is a bridge situated 2 km (1.2 mi) south-east of Aghabullogue village in County Cork, Ireland. It is 4.2 km (2.6 mi) north of Coachford village, and is depicted on both the 1841 and 1901 surveyed OS maps. The bridge is located at the meeting point of the townlands of Clonmoyle West and Peake, and lies within the civil parish of Aghabullogue.

The Ordnance Survey name book (c. 1840), refers to it as 'Ballinadighey Bridge'. In the Archaeological Inventory of County Cork, it is described as a road bridge over the Delehinagh River, with two semi-circular arches, roughly cut voussoirs, a pointed breakwater, and overflow channel to the south-west. Many of the surviving bridges in mid-Cork were originally constructed of stone, arched in shape, and late eighteenth or early nineteenth century in date.

O'Donoghue (1986) refers to Ballinadihy Bridge as being located at the southern end of Clonmoyle West townland, and holds the Irish version of Ballinadihy as Béal Áth na Daibhche, meaning 'ford mouth of the hollow'.
