= Clonmoyle West =

Clonmoyle West Irish: Cluain Maol Thiar
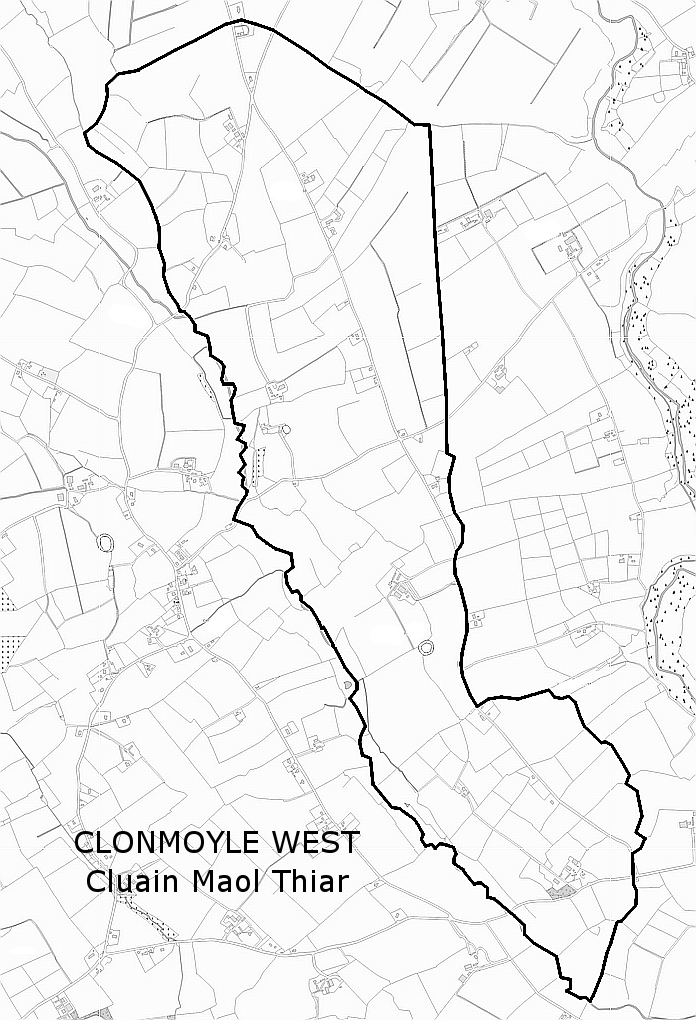

- Clonmoyle West shown within Ireland
- Coordinates: 51°56′59″N 8°47′50″W
- Country: Ireland
- County: County Cork
- Barony: Muskerry East
- Civil parish: Aghabullogue
- Settlements: Aghabullogue, Coachford

Government
  - Council: Cork County Council
  - Ward: Blarney-Macroom EA

Area
  - Total: 313.25 ha (774.1 acres)
- Irish grid reference: W451777

Clonmoyle West is a townland within both the civil parish and catholic parish of Aghabullogue, County Cork, Ireland. It is approximately 776 acres (3.14 km^{2}) in area, situated east of Aghabullogue village, and north-west of Coachford village. It adjoins the townland of Clonmoyle East.

== Name ==
A number of interpretations of 'Clonmoyle' can be found. The Ordnance Survey name book (c. 1840) suggests an Irish language version of Cluain Maoile meaning 'meadow of the hornless cow'. O'Donoghue (1986) suggests an Irish version of Cluain Mhaoil, meaning 'bare or bleak watershed', or possibly Cluain Maothaile meaning 'soft or spongy watershed'. O'Murchú (1991) suggests Cluain Mhaol as meaning 'the bare meadow'. The Placenames Database of Ireland gives an Irish name of Cluain Maol Thiar to the townland, with cluain meaning 'meadow' or 'pasture', and maol meaning 'bare' or 'flat-topped hillock'.

Earlier versions of townland name
Year	Form
1656-8	Clonmoile/Clonmolye/Clonmoyle (Down Survey)
1811	Clonmoyle (Bath's Grand Jury map)
1837	Clonmoyle (Lewis)
1840	Clonmoyle (OS name book)

== History ==
Townland population
Year	Pop.	±%
1841	428	—
1851	241	—
1861	121	—
1871	187	—
1881	125	—
1891	116	—
1901	92	—
1911	91	—

The area is referred to as 'Clonmoile' in the Down Survey (Muskerry) map, and 'Clonmolye' with arable and course pasture land in the Down Survey (Parishes of Ahabollog and Aghinagh) map, with the terrier naming the proprietor as an Irish papist, Cormack MacCallaghan Carthy of the 'denomination of Clonmoyle', consisting of three ploughlands and c. 1521 acres considered 'entirely profitable'.

The Ordnance Survey name book (c. 1840) describes the townland as situated in the east of Aghabullogue parish about seven miles east-north-east of Macroom. It was said to be the property of 'Chas (S) Oliver, Esqre', and of mixed quality, good and inferior, partially cultivated, and with much boggy land. Two 'Danish forts' (ringforts) were located in the townland. Local placenames included the Dele[h]inagh River, Shanavough and Ballinadihy Bridge. The mid-nineteenth century Primary Land Valuation (Griffith's Valuation) indicates 'Silver Charles Oliver' as the immediate lessor of c. 662 acres in Clonmoyle West, being approximately 86% of the entire townland area.

Clonmoyle Racecourse, a former horse racing venue on the eastern side of the townland, is described in the Ordnance Survey (OS) name book (c. 1840) as being "60 chains north-east from Aghabologue Chapel" (1.2 km (0.75 mi)). Depicted on the 1841 surveyed OS Map, it was located in a "barren mountainous field" on the highest part of the townland. It measured approximately one "English mile" in circumference, and races took place on the course "three or four times" in some years, with no races taking place during other years. The Cork Placenames Archive refers to related placenames, such as 'Racecourse Crossroads' and 'Racecourse Hill'. The land is no longer in use as a racecourse.

At the northern end of the townland is an area known as 'Shanavough'. The OS name book describes it as a sub-denomination of Clonmoyle West and 'situated in the north-west part of the townland ... about 50 chains (1 km (0.62 mi)) north from Aghabologue Chapel'. An Irish version of Seana bhoth, is given, meaning 'the old booth or tent'. O'Donoghue (1986) describes Shanavough as located in the northern end of the townland, and suggests an Irish version of Seana Mhacha, meaning 'old enclosure or milking place'.
