= Cottage House, Clonmoyle =

Cottage House
- Location within island of Ireland

General information
- Status: Private home (no public access)
- Type: Country house
- Location: Clonmoyle East, County Cork, Ireland
- Coordinates: 51°55′59″N 8°46′35″W

Cottage House is a country house in the townland of Clonmoyle East, situated 3.1 km (1.9 mi) south-east of Aghabullogue village and 4.4 km (2.7 mi) north of Coachford village. The house and demesne is one of many such houses situated along the valley of the River Lee and its tributaries.

Cottage House was once a Pyne family residence. In A Topographical Dictionary of Ireland (1837) the entry for the parish of Aghabologue is listed as containing "numerous large and elegant houses", including "the Cottage, of J. Pyne, Esq". The tithe applotment book for the townland of Clonmoyle East records 'John Pyne, Esq.' as occupying 127 acres.

The Landed Estates Database advises that Cottage House was originally a Vize residence, and later occupied by the Pyne family. Following the death of John Pyne in 1837, the property was left to his nephew, Reverend John Paul Lawless, "who took the name and arms of Pyne".

According to the Ordnance Survey name book of c. 1840, the townland was the property of Rev. J.L. Pyne and Molly Davis, principally being "excellent ground under cultivation", with "some bog and furze running through it". Cottage House was described as a "fine house with good offices attached", built by Rev. John Lawless Pine of Cloyne, and at the time being the residence of Richard Ellard, Esq. A "good deal" of ornamental ground was said to surround it.

By the mid-nineteenth century, the Primary Valuation of Ireland (Griffith's Valuation) records Rev. John Lawless Pine as immediate lessor of the property, which was then unoccupied, and valued at approximately £17. Pyne was also recorded as the occupier of approximately 1 acre of "plantation".

Today it remains a private residence, and is not accessible to the public.
