= Luskin's Bridge =

Bridge in County Cork, Ireland

- Location within island of Ireland
- 51°56′14″N 8°45′57″W
- Type: Bridge
- Location: Clonmoyle East/Kilcolman/Knockanenagark, County Cork, Ireland

History
- Built: c. 1800

Site notes
- Public access: Yes

Luskin's Bridge is situated 3.8 km (2.4 mi) north-east of Coachford village, County Cork, Ireland, 3.6 km (2.2 mi) south-east of Aghabullogue village, and is depicted on both the 1841 and 1901 surveyed OS maps. It is located at the meeting point of Clonmoyle East townland (which lies within the civil parish and Catholic parish of Aghabullogue) with Kilcolman and Knockanenagark townlands (which both lie within the civil parish of Magourney and Catholic parish of Aghabullogue).

In the Ordnance Survey name book (c. 1840), it is named 'Lurkan's Bridge', described as having three arches and on the road from Macroom to Mallow, with a man named Lurkan said to have previously lived in proximity to it.

The National Inventory of Architectural Heritage describes it as a double-arched bridge, built c. 1800, and spanning the Dripsey River. A single-span feeder arch is located on the western side. It also has rubble stone v-cutwaters on its north and south elevations, and rubble stone parapet walls with concrete capping. An upstream weir and additional arch were likely built to accommodate a mill race feeding Clonmoyle Mill to the south. The weir and mill race are both depicted on the 1901 surveyed OS Map.

Many surviving bridges in mid-Cork are originally constructed of stone, arched in shape, and late eighteenth or early nineteenth century in date.

== See also ==
- Clonmoyle Mill
- Leader's Aqueduct
