= Dripsey Castle, Carrignamuck =

Dripsey Castle
- Location within island of Ireland

General information
- Type: Country house
- Location: Carrignamuck, County Cork, Ireland
- Coordinates: 51°55′37″N 8°45′19″W
- Years built: mid 18th century (original house); early 20th century (north wing addition)
- Owner: Private ownership (no public access)

Dripsey Castle is a country house in the townland of Carrignamuck, situated 3.3 km (2.1 mi) north-east of Coachford village and 2.5 km (1.6 mi) north-west of Dripsey village. The house was built, c. 1740, to replace the earlier 15th-century Carrignamuck Tower House.

== History ==
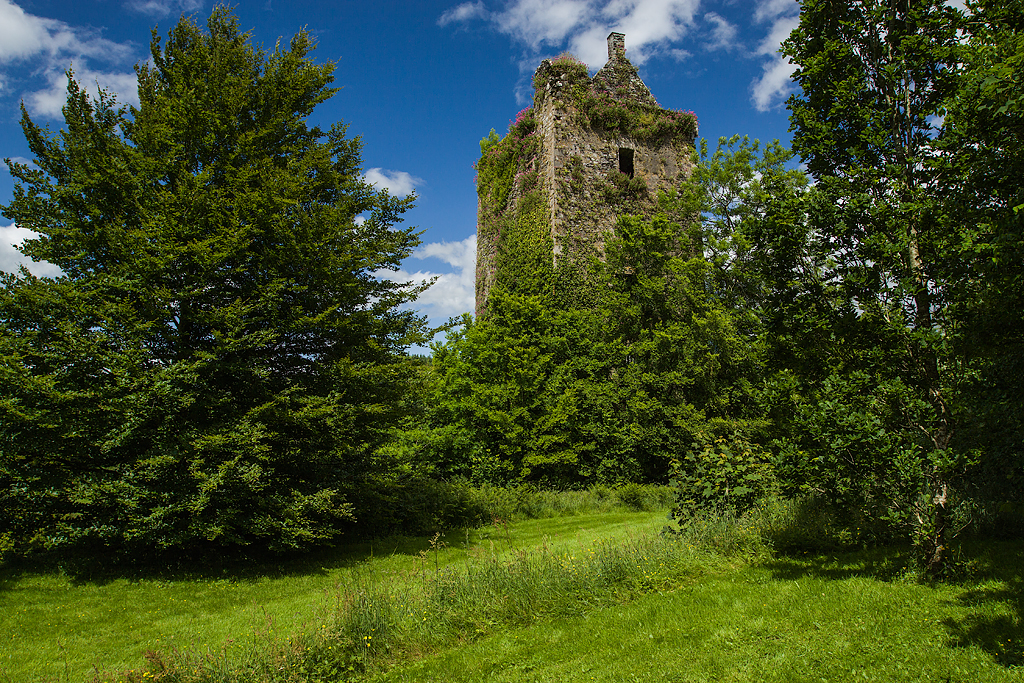
The 15th-century Carrignamuck Tower House was the main house at Carrignamuck until the Colthursts built Dripsey Castle in the 18th century

The estate at Dripsey, associated with Carrignamuck Tower House, originally dates from the 15th century, when the tower house was commissioned by Cormac McTeige MacCarthy, 9th Lord of Muskerry. The Anglo-Norman Colthurst family subsequently took over the estate and, c. 1740, built what is now known as Dripsey Castle.

The house and estate were owned by the Colthurst family through the 19th century and Samuel Lewis, writing in 1837, describes it as 'Dripsey House, the residence of J.H. Colthurst, Esq'. The Ordnance Survey name book (published c. 1840) also refers both to the 'house and demesne' of Dripsey Castle as a gentleman's seat belonging to John Henry Colthurst, Esq. The mid-nineteenth-century Primary Valuation of Ireland (Griffith's Valuation) records John H. Colthurst as occupying c. 194 acres in Carrignamuck townland, consisting of a 'house, offices, and land', with the lessor being Margaret Colthurst.

Descendants of the Colthurst family continued to occupy Dripsey Castle into the early twentieth century. John Colthurst of Dripsey Castle married Jane Bowen of Oak Grove, Carrigadrohid, Cork. A grandson of theirs, John Henry, resided at Dripsey Castle and another, George, at Carhue House. Their granddaughter Peggy married Alfred Greer and they were residing at Dripsey Castle during the 1870s, with Greer having purchased part of the Dripsey estate, advertised for sale in October 1851, and comprising over 1900 acres. Their daughter Georgina succeeded to Dripsey Castle, and in 1878 married Robert Walter Travers Bowen, who took the additional name of Colthurst in 1882. It was their son, Captain John Bowen-Colthurst, who ordered the shooting of Francis Sheehy-Skeffington in 1916. He was court-martialled and found guilty of murder but insane at the time of the offence. The family were subsequently boycotted, and ultimately left Dripsey Castle. The O'Shaughnessy family bought the castle in 1922. It was sold in 2015 for €2m to 'an overseas buyer'.

Dripsey Castle remains a private residence, and is not accessible to the public, but its gardens are sometimes used for local events.

== Architecture ==
The National Inventory of Architectural Heritage (NIAH) describes Dripsey Castle as a detached, seven-bay, three-storey country house, built c. 1740, and having a central pedimented three-bay breakfront, a canted bay window on its southern side, and a three-bay, two-storey, flat-roofed wing on its northern side with recent extension. A farm complex of single and double-storey buildings lies to the west, having a central pedimented breakfront which reflects the design of the main house. The NIAH entry describes a "later north-wing addition of the twentieth century" and states that its "Historic features include timber sash windows, a Venetian window in the breakfront, and a timber-panelled door". Dripsey Castle forms part of a larger group of demesne structures along the Dripsey River. The Archaeological Inventory of County Cork describes the house as being of late-eighteenth-century appearance, with the central door approached by a flight of stone steps.

The Irish Tourist Association (ITA) survey of 1944 held Dripsey Castle to be the principal residence in the parish. At the time of the ITA survey, the drawing-room contained a carved marble mantlepiece, and in the breakfast room a bookcase said to be made from timber originating in Carrigadrohid Castle.

At the entrance gate is a detached, single-storey gate lodge, built c. 1850, and a circular ornamental tower (folly) built c. 1840 having a crenellated parapet and rubble stone walls.

== See also ==
- Dripsey Castle Bridge
- Trafalgar Monument, Carrignamuck
- Colthurst's Bridge
