= Carrignamuck Tower House =

Medieval tower house in County Cork, Ireland

- Dripsey Castle
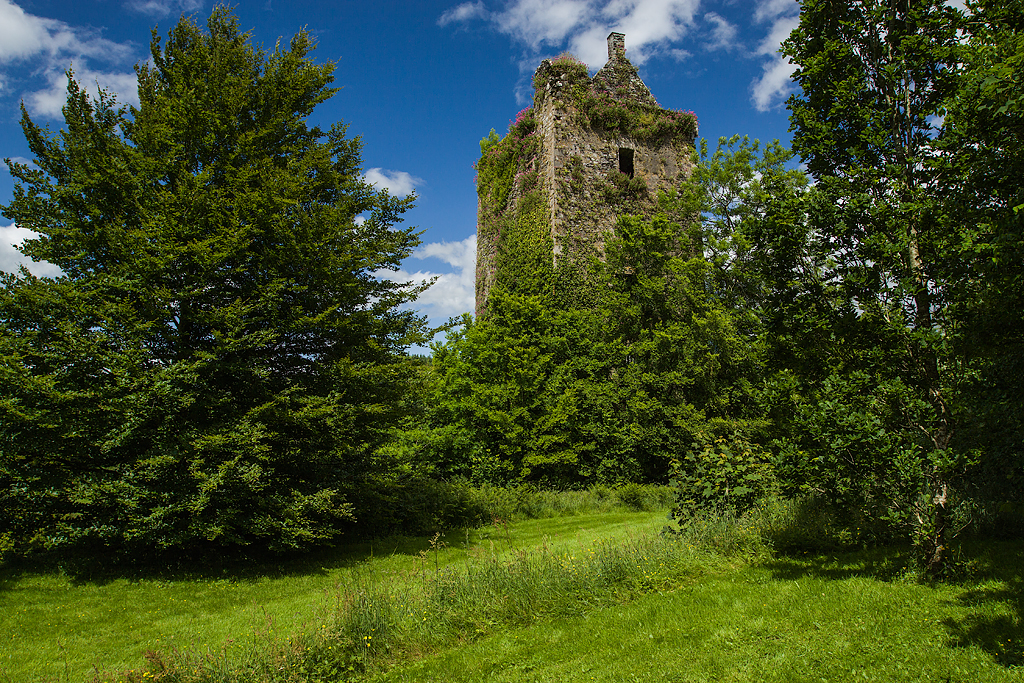
- Carrignamuck Tower House

- Location within island of Ireland
- 51°55′41″N 8°45′17″W
- Type: Tower house
- Location: Carrignamuck, County Cork, Ireland

History
- Built: late 15th century
- Built by: Cormac Láidir MacCarthy

Site notes
- Condition: Ruined
- Owner: Private
- Public access: No

Carrignamuck Tower House, located in Carrignamuck townland, is a 15th century tower house located 2.8 km (1.7 mi) north of Coachford village and 2 km (1.2 mi) north-west of Dripsey village. It is also sometimes known as 'Dripsey Castle', a name latterly attributed to the 18th century house, Dripsey Castle, built nearby.

== Structure ==
The structure is a tower house, as opposed to a castle, and was one of a chain of MacCarthy of Muskerry tower houses extending westwards beyond Macroom. Tower houses were built during the fifteenth and sixteenth centuries as residences by Gaelic and Old English families, and though not castles in the strict sense, retained many similar features such as battlements, machicolations and narrow slit windows. Carrignamuck is an L-shaped, five-storey tower, which was repaired in 1866 when a slate roof, fireplaces, and wooden front door were inserted. The entrance is set into the east wall, and the ground floor contains a lobby, main chamber, fireplace, smaller chamber and concrete floor. The first floor contains main, secondary, garderobe and murder-hole chambers, with one of its windows containing a timber frame said to come from the former Church of Ireland parish church at Aghabullogue. The second floor has a main chamber with fireplace, and a garderobe chamber. The third floor contains a main chamber and a smaller chamber. The fourth floor contains a main chamber with fireplace and slate roof, the remains of a smaller chamber, and access to an external wall-walk with no surviving battlements. Adjoining the tower house are terraces, which may be the result of earlier demesne landscaping.

== History ==
The tower house is firstly depicted on a sketch map the description of Muskery of c. 1590 and named 'Carrigomuck'. It is also depicted on the Down Survey Map of 1656-8, with the accompanying terrier stating that 'on Carrignemucke stands a castle and a mill'.

Smith (1774) describes the 'Castle of Carrignamuck' as inhabited by Mr. Bear, once belonging to the Mac-Carthys, situated on the Muskerry side of the (Dripsey) river, and having a garrison of Oliver Cromwell stationed there for some time. Lewis (1837) mentions the 'ancient castle of Carrignamuck' as built in the fifteenth century by the founder of Blarney Castle, and being situated on the bank of the Dripsey River, surrounded by trees, within the parish of Magourney. The tower house is described in the Ordnance Survey name book (c. 1840) and depicted in both the OS 1842 and 1901 surveyed maps as a ruin. Gillman (1892) advises that it was known as Carrig na Muc castle, and according to tradition was built by Cormac Laidir MacCarthy, lord of Muskerry 1455-1495.

Local tradition is said to maintain that the proper name for Carrignamuck was Carrig Cormac, and that the (tower house) was named after Cormac Laidher McCarthy, the builder of Blarney Castle. In the Tourist Association Survey of 1944, it is called 'Carrignamuck Castle' and known to be also referred to as Dripsey Castle. Cormac McTeige MacCarthy, surnamed Láidir, 9th Lord of Muskerry, having succeeded in 1449, was said to have built the (tower house) and later died in 1494. Regarded as the official residence of the Tanist (heir in succession to Blarney Castle) it had been bombarded in 1650 from nearby Meeshal Hill by Lord Broghill (also Roger Boyle, 1st Earl of Orrery), leader of a troop of Cromwellian soldiers. The slate roof was put in place by the Colthurst family, and by 1944 it had become the property of John O'Shaughnessy, owner of Dripsey Woollen Mills. The building was locked, with a key obtainable at nearby Dripsey House.

Milner (1975) also contends that the correct title of the property should be Carrig Cormac, and O'Donoghue (1986) contends that it was built in 1450 by Cormac McCarthy Laidir, and that the name was derived from a nearby location, where it was customary to slaughter pigs, so as to supply bacon to the inhabitants.

Cormac McCarthy Laidir's brother Eoghan lived as tanist for a time at Carrignamuck, until Cormac was killed during an argument between them. This resulted in Eoghan's claims on the title being denied and he was debarred from succeeding. In 1580 Donyll McTeige MacCarthy (tanist of Muskerry and brother of Sir Cormac McTeige MacCarthy of Blarney Castle) resided at Carrignamuck. He was injured in a local skirmish between the forces of the MacCarthys of Muskerry and those of Sir James Fitzgerald of Desmond during the Second Desmond Rebellion and later died at Carrignamuck. Upon the death of Sir Cormac MacTeige in 1583, his next brother Callaghan succeeded as Lord of Muskerry, but gave up his position shortly afterwards in favour of a nephew, Cormac MacDermod. Callaghan was allowed to resume his residency at Carrignamuck as Lieutenant. His son Cormac later inherited the estate, but forfeited it in 1641. The Colthurst family later purchased the property and built the residence known as Dripsey Castle in the grounds. Subsequently the tower house and grounds came into the ownership of the O'Shaughnessy family.

Carrignamuck tower house is not accessible to the public and is located on private property.

== See also ==
- Dripsey Castle Bridge
- Trafalgar Monument, Carrignamuck
- Colthurst's Bridge
