= Andrew O'Shaughnessy =

Andrew O'Shaughnessy may refer to:

- Andrew O'Shaughnessy (politician) (1866–1956), Irish politician and businessman, independent TD for Cork Borough 1923–1927
- Andrew O'Shaughnessy (historian) (born 1959), British historian
- Andrew O'Shaughnessy (hurler) (born 1984), Irish hurler for Kilmallock Limerick
