= Carhoo Upper =

- townland

Irish transcription(s)
  - Derivation: An Cheathrú Uachtarach
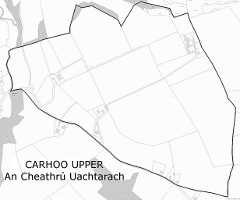

- Carhoo Upper shown within Ireland
- Coordinates: 51°54′57″N 8°48′55″W
- Irish grid ref: W439740
- Country: Ireland
- County: County Cork
- Barony: Muskerry East
- Civil parish: Magourney
- First recorded: c. 1590
- Settlements: Coachford

Government
  - Council: Cork County Council
  - Ward: Blarney-Macroom EA

Area
  - Total: 80.57 ha (199.1 acres)

Carhoo Upper (from Irish An Cheathrú Uachtarach) is a townland within the civil parish of Magourney and catholic parish of Aghabullogue, County Cork, Ireland. It is 199.08 acres (80.56 ha) in size, and west of Coachford village.

Carhoo firstly appears c. 1590 as 'Carown' in a sketch map The description of Muskery, retained as part of the Dartmouth Map Collection, at the National Maritime Museum, Greenwich. In the Down Survey Maps (1656-8), it is referred to as 'Carrow' and 'Carrooe', and the accompanying terrier lists Thomas and Edmund Coppinger as proprietors by way of mortgage. The Ordnance Survey name book (c. 1840) describes Carhoo Upper as bounded on the north by Rockgrove townland and on the west by Aghinagh parish. Townland name versions include 'Carhoo' and 'Carhue'. O'Murchú (1991) holds Ceathrú as meaning a quarter, in this instance a measurement of land, such as a townland or ploughland, and being a smaller division than a tuath or triocha céad. The Placenames Database of Ireland gives the townland an Irish name of An Cheathrú Uachtarach, with Ceathrú meaning a quarterland.

Townland population
Year	Pop.
1841	127
1851	53
1861	44
1871	32
1881	18
1891	28
1901	22
1911	20

Earlier versions of townland name
Year	Form
c. 1590	Carown (Sketch map of Muskery)
1656-8	Carrow/Carrooe (Down Survey)
1811	Carhue (Bath's Grand Jury map)
1840	Carhue/Carhoo (OS name book)

== Townland sites/items of interest ==
- Glashagarriff Bridge, Carhue
