= Clonmoyle Mill =

Watermill in County Cork, Ireland

- Location within island of Ireland
- 51°56′3″N 8°46′0″W
- Type: Watermill
- Location: Clonmoyle East, County Cork, Ireland

History
- Built: Mid 19th Century

Site notes
- Condition: Ruined
- Public access: No

Clonmoyle Mill was a watermill in the townland of Clonmoyle East, situated 4 km (2.5 mi) south-east of Aghabullogue village and 3.5 km (2.2 mi) north-east of Coachford village.

The Archaeological Inventory of County Cork (1997) describes it as a (now roofless and without floors) mid to late nineteenth century corn mill, rectangular, four-storey, with a three bay entrance front, and located on the western bank of the Dripsey River. Access to the third floor of the mill was gained from a 'modernized residential house' via a stone platform and cement bridge. A wheel pit housed a cast-iron suspension water wheel with a diameter of 4.9 metres, and inscribed 'J. Steel and Sons, Vulcan Foundry, Cork'. A pinion-wheel, via a pit-wheel within the mill, powered two line shafts, which in turn powered two pairs of French burr millstones on the first floor. A similar gable-ended structure was attached to the mill north wall, with intact roof and floors, but in poor condition. Foundation blocks for machinery remained on the ground floor, but all gearing and machinery had been removed, with a Crossley Engine lying discarded to the north.

Clonmoyle Mill is not depicted on the 1841 surveyed OS Map, nor mentioned in Ordnance Survey name books, and would appear to be of later construction. It exists by the mid-nineteenth century, as the Primary Valuation of Ireland (Griffith's Valuation) records a Hamilton as occupier of a 'Flour Mill' in Clonmoyle, with the buildings valued at £34, and the Lessor being Jonathan Bruce. This is the same Jonathan Bruce who was then occupier of nearby Clonmoyle House, leased from Charles Colthurst. On the 1901 surveyed OS Map, it is depicted as 'Clonmoyle Mill (Corn)', with a nearby footbridge, sluice to the Dripsey River and mill race originating to the north near Luskin's Bridge.

The Irish Tourist Association survey of 1944 confirms Clonmoyle House as the residence of Mrs Young, who also 'owned nearby Clonmoyle Flour Mills'. A separate survey entry is contained for Clonmoyle Flour Mills, giving the company name of 'John Young and Sons Limited, Clonmoyle, Coachford', which company appears to exist to this day. The survey states that numerous mills were erected around the period of the Great Famine to meet increased demand for the processing of Indian meal and it was thought Clonmoyle Mill was built for this reason as between 1847 and 1854. The exact year of construction was uncertain, but a grinding stone, said to be a replacement from another mill, bore the date 1856. Clonmoyle Mill was said to have first been operated by 'Charles Colthurst of Ballyvourney' and that methods introduced by him were still followed in 1944, and the mill independently operated, some ninety years later. Wheat was kiln dried in the loft, heated through a perforated floor, and then ground into flour by stone rollers driven from the mill wheel. The older milling method employed was said to be preferred. Oats and barley were also ground for the feeding of cattle, pigs and poultry. Visitors were admitted to the mill, free of charge, but at their own risk.

O'Donoghue (1986) refers to 'flour mills' located at the eastern side of Clonmoyle East, which were by then disused. Today, Clonmoyle Mill is in a ruinous condition and its surroundings neglected.
