= Peter Herrmann (social philosopher) =

Social philosopher, sociologist and academic of German origin

Peter Herrmann is a social philosopher, sociologist and academic of German origin. Between 1995 and 2013 he worked in Ireland where he occupied at the end the position of a senior research fellow at University College Cork, School of Applied Social Studies. 2013 he moved to Rome, Italy, where he worked independently, but in close connection with the Italian research institute EURISPES. From 2015 to 2017 he worked as Professor for Economics at Bangor College of Central South University of Forestry & Technology, Changsha, PRC, and as Senior Foreign Expert. School of Public Affairs, Dept. of Social Security and Risk Management, Zhejiang University, Hangzhou, P.R.China. In September 2017 he commenced a one-year research position at the Max Planck Institute for Social Law and Social Policy in Munich, Bavaria, from where he changed in October 2018 to the Faculty of Economics and Sociology at the University of Lodz in Poland. Since October 2019 he is research fellow at the Human Rights Centre. Law School at Central South University, Changsha, PRC.

Additionally, he is associate professor at the Department of Social Sciences of the University of Eastern Finland [www.uef.fi], and he holds a permanent visiting professorship as honorary associate professor at the Corvinus University (Faculty of Social Sciences and International Relations, Institute of World Economy) in Budapest, Hungary. Since November 2013 he is also visiting scholar at the Department of Chinese Studies at NUI Maynooth , Ireland.

Until 2013 he had been director of the independent research institute ESOSC (European Social, Organisational and Science Consultancy) with its headquarters in Aghabullogue, Ireland. After Herrmann moved to Italy, the work of the institute was discontinued.

== Personal life ==
Herrmann was born into a bourgeois family and had been brought up in a Protestant milieu, though without being embedded in a strictly religious environment. During his youth he had been politically engaged in different ways, distancing himself increasingly from his family background. At the end of his studies he married. He has one daughter who lives in Germany. He later divorced.

== Academic career ==
Herrmann studied sociology (Bielefeld), political science (Leipzig) and economics (Hamburg). 1981 he obtained the diploma in sociology from the university in Bielefeld and his doctorate in philosophy in 1992 from the university in Bremen . At the institute for local social policy and non-profit organisations in Bremen, Herrmann analysed in close cooperation with Rudolph Bauer and Jürgen Blandow the politics and policies of non-governmental organisations. He focused on the meaning of the process of European integration for national social policy and the impact on the third sector.

== Research ==
While studying sociology, Herrmann concentrated on sociology of organisations – this had been also the subject of his PhD-dissertation, titled “Society and organisation. An analysis of modern society” (Rheinfelden/Berlin: Schäuble, 1994). This work integrated topics of social policy, civil society, theory of modernisation and general philosophy. His methodological thinking had been and still is influenced by historical and dialectical materialism, systems theory and the theory of civilisation. Against this background he undertook several studies, especially in the area of European integration.

Based on Herrmann’s experience gained from the work at the Platform of Social NGOs and the European Social Action Network (ESAN), he took an increasingly critical position towards the subtle mechanisms of the process of European integration.

At a very early stage Herrmann discussed and theorised processes he saw as “politics bypassing the nation state” (see European Integration between Institution Building and Social Process. Contributions to a Theory of Modernisation and NGOs in the Context of the Development of the EU; New York: Nova Science, 1998 ) and which became later known under the term “multilevel governance”.

The close cooperation with the European Foundation on Social Quality and later International Association for Social Quality, namely with Laurent van der Maesen, pushed his analytical interest towards the search for alternatives. His thorough research, geared against political voluntarism and based in a systematic analysis of forms of government and the respective social policy gave important impulses for the debates on social quality thinking.

Research visits in – amongst others – Australia (at the Cairns Institute ), Austria, France, Germany, Hungary (there at the ELTE - Eötvös Loránd university in connection with Zsuzsa Ferge), Sweden, Taiwan (on invitation of the Institute of Humanities and Social Science) and Turkey (at ODTÜ - Orta Doğu Teknik Üniversitesi , supported by TÜBİTAK - Türkiye bilimsel ve Teknolojik Arastirma) strengthened his critical attitude towards traditional approaches of social policy. Increasingly important had been his orientation on a critique of political economy.

Moreover, Herrmann had been until 2021 correspondent to the Max Planck Institute for Social Policy and Social Law (previously Max-Planck Institute for Foreign and International Social Law) in Munich, Germany. This allowed him to study more closely the ambiguity of social and human rights law – issues he discussed in particular in his collaboration with Hans F. Zacher. Especially with reference to Zacher he worked on the consideration of the “pre-legal” determination of law, thus allowing not least an integration with political economy.

His academic work is not least expressed in his engagement as member of the scientific council of the German branch of attac (until its dissolution in 2021 and in the EuroMemo Group – a network of economists that is looking for alternative policies - he discontinued this engagement in 2020 for health reasons, but also as critique of the lacking vigor of an open, radical alternative.

The different connections, Herrmann established over time, based on the wide range of topics, linked him since 2011 also to the work of the Eurasian Center for Big History and System Forecasting at the Moscow State University, in particular collaborating with Andrey Korotayev and Leonid Grinin, Russia, the All-Russian Centre of Living Standard Moscow, and the Plekhanov Russian University of Economics , Moscow.

== Current activities ==
After his move to Rome, Italy, Herrmann developed independently, but also as member of the scientific council of EURISPES [www.eurispes.eu] (Istituto di Studi Politici, Economici e Sociali), his research. Important contacts for further developments could be established to the University La Sapienza , Rome, the university Pontificia Università San Tommaso d’Aquino – Angelicum of the Vatican www.vatican.va, the Hungarian academy of science , namely Ferenc Bodi. Furthermore he developed working relations to the research unit Centro de Investigaciones de Política Internacional (CIPI) at the foreign ministry in Cuba as well as to the School of Public Affairs, Department of Social Security and Risk Management at Zhejiang University and the Bangor College at CSUFT Central South University of Forestry and Technology in the People's Republic of China and the Human Rights Centre at the Law School, Central South University. According to his entries on researchgate, his work is currently focusing on issues of digitisation. While he sees it in part as challenge around social security and employment law, his main interest aims on clarifying the meaning of ongoing processes for the existing mode of production. He sees increasingly the need to revisit not least in this context the question of Human Rights against the background of changing global constellations.

In 2015 he donated his books (as far as they had not been lost during the various moves) to EURIPSES [www.eurispes.it], hoping that they will be in this way available for the wider public for research.
