= Dripsey Castle Bridge =

- Coordinates: 51°55′47″N 8°45′40″W
- Crosses: Delehinagh River
- Locale: Carrignamuck/Meeshal, County Cork, Ireland

Characteristics
- Design: Triple-arch stone bridge

History
- Built: c. 1780

Location
- Interactive map of Dripsey Castle Bridge

Dripsey Castle Bridge is a bridge in County Cork. It is situated 1.34 km (0.83 mi) north-west of Dripsey village and derives its name from nearby Dripsey Castle. Depicted on both the 1841 and 1901 surveyed OS maps, it spans a section of the Delehinagh River. The bridge is located at the meeting point of Carrignamuck and Meeshal townlands, and lies within the civil parish of Magourney and Catholic parish of Aghabullogue.

In the Ordnance Survey name book of c. 1840, it is referred to as a small stone bridge, one-eight of a mile to the south-west of Hayfield House. The National Inventory of Architectural Heritage describes it as a triple-arch humpback road bridge built c. 1780. It has rubble stone walls, concrete capping to the parapet, arches with dressed stone voussoirs, and v-shaped cutwaters on its east and west elevations.

== See also ==
- Carrignamuck Tower House
- Colthurst's Bridge
