= Glashagarriff River =

River in County Cork, Ireland

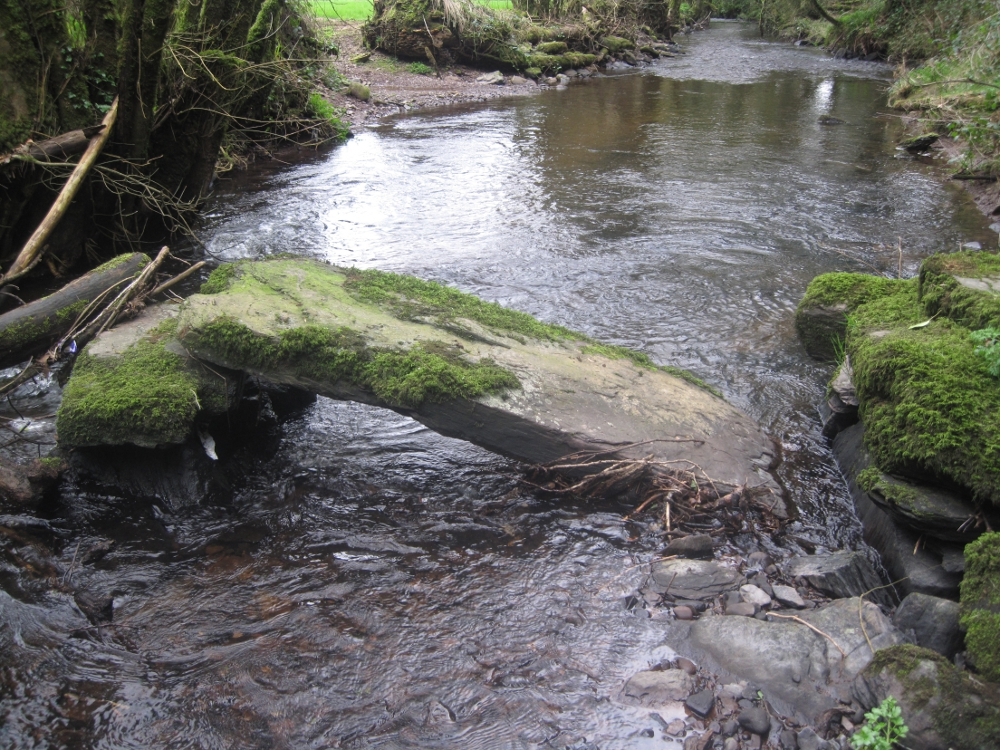
- A clapper bridge, over Glashagarriff River, at Mullinhassig Wood
- Native name: Glaise Gharbh (Irish)

Physical characteristics
- Source
  - location: County Cork, Ireland
- Mouth: Confluence with River Lee at Inniscarra Lake
  - coordinates: 51.9101°N 8.8269°W

Glashagarriff River (Irish: Glaise Gharbh, meaning 'rough rivulet') is a tributary of the River Lee in County Cork, Ireland.

== Name and location ==
Glashagarriff is an anglicised version of the Irish Glaise Gharbh (meaning 'rough stream'). The 18th century topographer, Charles Smith, refers to it as the 'Glashigarriff' river. The Ordnance Survey name book of c. 1840 gives various versions such as 'Clashgorrave', 'Closhagorrave', 'Closhagorriff' and 'Closhagorriv', and describes the river as rising out of the bogs of Doneens and Lyroe, flowing between the parishes of Aghinagh, Aghabollogue and Magourney, and falling into the River Lee to the south.

There are a number of waterfalls on the river, including at Mullinhassig Wood, and close to its confluence with the River Lee.

An Irish Tourist Association survey of 1944 refers to the Glashagarriff river as having brown trout and freshwater eels, but no salmon angling, nor permit for trout fishing required.

== Glashagarriff Bridge ==
Glashagarriff Bridge is a bridge on the river approximately 2.8 km (1.7 mi) west of Coachford village. It is located at a meeting point of four townlands (Carhoo Lower, Carhoo Upper, Carrigathou and Coolnagearagh) and two civil parishes (Aghinagh and Magourney). Referred to as 'Clashgarriff Br.' on the 1841 surveyed OS map, and 'Glashagarriff Br.' on the 1901 surveyed OS map, the bridge spans the Glashagarriff River before it joins the River Lee a short distance to the south.

At Cork Spring Assizes in 1807, a presentment was approved in favour of Richard Townsend and Cornelius Molony to repair 'Gassagariff bridge, between Cork and Macromp' for the amount of £10 9s 4d. At Cork Spring Assizes in March 1828, an application for a presentment was approved for the amount of £71 8s 8d, in favour of Charles Colthurst, John Bowen, John Haly and William Haly 'to widen Glashagorrive bridge on the road from Cork to Macroom.
