= Andrew O'Shaughnessy (politician) =

Irish politician and industrialist (1866–1956)

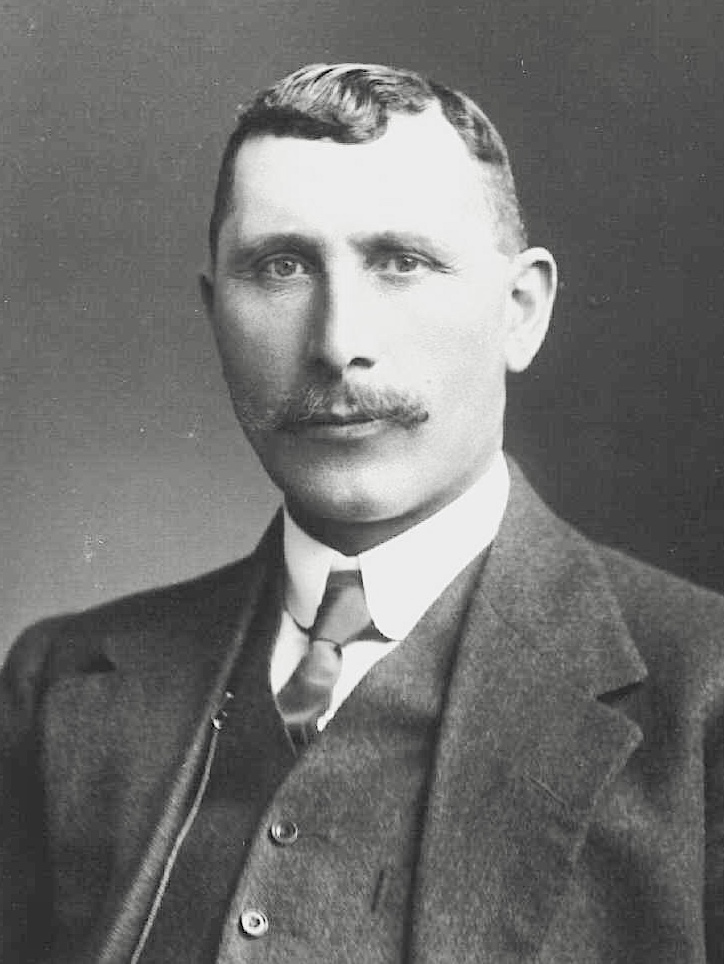
- O'Shaughnessy, c.1900s

Teachta Dála
- In office August 1923 – June 1927
- Constituency: Cork Borough

Personal details
- Born: 28 July 1866 County Cork, Ireland
- Died: 1956 (aged 89–90) County Cork, Ireland
- Party: Business and Professional Group

Andrew O'Shaughnessy (28 July 1866 – 1956) was an Irish politician and industrialist.

== Business ==
O'Shaughnessy started his career with the opening of a creamery in Newmarket in 1895. He then added other creameries in County Cork and County Tipperary to build the Newmarket Dairy Company which eventually had twenty four branches.

In 1903 he purchased Dripsey Woollen Mills from Charles Olden. In the following years he added Kilkenny Woolen mills, Sallybrook Woollen Mills, Bridgetown Flour mills and Dock Milling Company, Dublin to his ownership, thus establishing himself as one of the leading woollen manufacturers in Ireland. His publishing interests included a stake in Standard Press Ltd and Juverna Press Ltd, Dublin. During this time he also built about 70 cottages for the mill workers in what is now known as the Model Village in Dripsey. Newspaper reports from the time comment on the quality of Dripsey tweed and drapery of which 90 per cent was for export to Paris, London, Asia and Canada. After his death in 1956, Dripsey Woollen Mills remained in the family and went on to win 8 Gold Medals at the Sacramento fair in the 1960s. The mills eventually closed in the 1980s.

== Politics ==
He was elected to Dáil Éireann as a Teachta Dála (TD) for the Cork Borough constituency at the 1923 general election. In June 1924 the Minister for External Affairs, Desmond FitzGerald, appointed O'Shaughnessy as representative from Ireland at the International Labour Conference at Geneva. His party label, "Cork Progressive Association", was a name used by the Business and Professional Group, a loose association of businessmen formed during the Third Dáil. He did not contest the June 1927 general election.

== Later life ==
O'Shaughnessy restored a number of residences of character in Cork, and over his life lived in over sixteen different properties. Among the residences he lived in were St Raphael's house, Montenotte; Windsor in Rochestown (now Rochestown Park Hotel) and Dripsey Castle (formerly the home of the Bowen-Colthurst family, and sold by members of the O'Shaughnessy family in 2015).

Dáil	Election	Deputy (Party)	Deputy (Party)	Deputy (Party)	Deputy (Party)	Deputy (Party)
2nd	1921	Liam de Róiste (SF)	Mary MacSwiney (SF)	Donal O'Callaghan (SF)	J. J. Walsh (SF)	4 seats 1921–1923
3rd	1922	Liam de Róiste (PT-SF)	Mary MacSwiney (AT-SF)	Robert Day (Lab)	J. J. Walsh (PT-SF)	4 seats 1921–1923
4th	1923	Richard Beamish (Ind.)	Mary MacSwiney (Rep)	Andrew O'Shaughnessy (Ind.)	J. J. Walsh (CnaG)	Alfred O'Rahilly (CnaG)
4th	1924 by-election	Richard Beamish (Ind.)	Mary MacSwiney (Rep)	Andrew O'Shaughnessy (Ind.)	J. J. Walsh (CnaG)	Michael Egan (CnaG)
5th	1927 (Jun)	John Horgan (NL)	Seán French (FF)	Richard Anthony (Lab)	J. J. Walsh (CnaG)	Barry Egan (CnaG)
6th	1927 (Sep)	W. T. Cosgrave (CnaG)	Seán French (FF)	Richard Anthony (Lab)	Hugo Flinn (FF)	Barry Egan (CnaG)
7th	1932	W. T. Cosgrave (CnaG)	Thomas Dowdall (FF)	Richard Anthony (Ind.)	Hugo Flinn (FF)	William Desmond (CnaG)
8th	1933	W. T. Cosgrave (CnaG)	Thomas Dowdall (FF)	Richard Anthony (Ind.)	Hugo Flinn (FF)	William Desmond (CnaG)
9th	1937	W. T. Cosgrave (FG)	Thomas Dowdall (FF)	Richard Anthony (Ind.)	Hugo Flinn (FF)	4 seats 1937–1948
10th	1938	W. T. Cosgrave (FG)	Thomas Dowdall (FF)	James Hickey (Lab)	Hugo Flinn (FF)	4 seats 1937–1948
11th	1943	W. T. Cosgrave (FG)	Frank Daly (FF)	Richard Anthony (Ind.)	Séamus Fitzgerald (FF)	4 seats 1937–1948
12th	1944	William Dwyer (Ind.)	Frank Daly (FF)	Richard Anthony (Ind.)	Walter Furlong (FF)	4 seats 1937–1948
12th	1946 by-election	Patrick McGrath (FF)	Frank Daly (FF)	Richard Anthony (Ind.)	Walter Furlong (FF)	4 seats 1937–1948
13th	1948	Patrick McGrath (FF)	Michael Sheehan (Ind.)	James Hickey (NLP)	Jack Lynch (FF)	Thomas F. O'Higgins (FG)
14th	1951	Patrick McGrath (FF)	Seán McCarthy (FF)	James Hickey (Lab)	Jack Lynch (FF)	Thomas F. O'Higgins (FG)
14th	1954 by-election	Patrick McGrath (FF)	Seán McCarthy (FF)	James Hickey (Lab)	Jack Lynch (FF)	Stephen Barrett (FG)
15th	1954	Patrick McGrath (FF)	Anthony Barry (FG)	Seán Casey (Lab)	Jack Lynch (FF)	Stephen Barrett (FG)
15th	1956 by-election	John Galvin (FF)	Anthony Barry (FG)	Seán Casey (Lab)	Jack Lynch (FF)	Stephen Barrett (FG)
16th	1957	John Galvin (FF)	Gus Healy (FF)	Seán Casey (Lab)	Jack Lynch (FF)	Stephen Barrett (FG)
17th	1961	John Galvin (FF)	Anthony Barry (FG)	Seán Casey (Lab)	Jack Lynch (FF)	Stephen Barrett (FG)
17th	1964 by-election	Sheila Galvin (FF)	Anthony Barry (FG)	Seán Casey (Lab)	Jack Lynch (FF)	Stephen Barrett (FG)
18th	1965	Gus Healy (FF)	Pearse Wyse (FF)	Seán Casey (Lab)	Jack Lynch (FF)	Stephen Barrett (FG)
18th	1967 by-election	Gus Healy (FF)	Pearse Wyse (FF)	Seán French (FF)	Jack Lynch (FF)	Stephen Barrett (FG)
19th	1969	Constituency abolished. See Cork City North-West and Cork City South-East				
