= Carhue House =

- Location within island of Ireland
- Alternative names: Carhoo House

General information
- Status: Private house (no public access)
- Type: Country house
- Location: Carhoo Lower, County Cork, Ireland
- Coordinates: 51°54′13.52″N 8°48′46.10″W
- Completed: c. 1750

Carhue House (also known as Carhoo House) is a country house in the townland of Carhoo Lower, situated 2.2 km (1.4 mi) west of Coachford village. It is one of several such houses in mid-Cork, many of which are situated along the valley of the River Lee and its tributaries.

== Description ==
The house's entry in the National Inventory of Architectural Heritage describes it as a detached five-bay, three-storey house, built c. 1750, having a pedimented central bay to the front, a two-storey extension to the rear, and a recent front porch addition. The gabled chimney-stacks, lack of depth in plan and pedimented breakfront are said to indicate an early construction date, with the window proportions, door opening and breakfront being typical of its time. Parkland once existing to the south of Carhue House has been lost to river erosion following the River Lee hydroelectric scheme of the late 1950s.

== History ==
It was once the residence of the Coppinger family. The accompanying terrier to the Down Survey map (1656-8) lists Thomas and Edmund Coppinger as proprietors by way of mortgage of 'Carrooe'. Lewis's Topographical Dictionary of Ireland (1837) describes Carhue as being the seat of J. Rye Coppinger, Esq. The tithe applotment book for the parish of Magourney records 'John Rye Coppinger, Esq.' of 'Lower Carhue' as occupying c. 275 acres of titheable land.

The mid-nineteenth century Primary Valuation of Ireland (Griffith's Valuation) records Henry T. Coppinger, Esq. as occupying in fee simple c. 154 acres in Carhoo Lower townland, consisting of a 'house, offices (dilapidated), land' and some 6 acres of water. Henry T. Coppinger also appears to lease c. 126 acres within the townland, during this time, to James Wiseman, consisting of 'offices, land' and some 2 acres of water.

Indications of financial distress surfaced at Carhue following the Great Famine (Ireland). By February 1850, the farm interest of George Foott had been surrendered and the stock, crops, implements and furniture put up for auction without reserve. Foott had previously secured a loan for £100 in 1848 under the Land Improvement Act. The house, offices and demesne of Carhue were offered for lease in March 1850, comprising 290 acres of pasture and tillage, with 50 acres suitable for oats or barley, having been cropped with turnips and carrots that season, and the lands described as highly cultivated and employed for dairy farming for years. That part held by Foott, comprising 140 acres, was available for lease separately. On 9 April 1850 a large quantity of oak, ash, elm, beech and sycamore was put up for auction without reserve at Carhue. By 29 June 1852 an unreserved auction was scheduled for the sale of Carhue demesne including fourteen acres of wheat, nine acres of barley, ten acres of oats, sixty acres of meadow, ten acres of potatoes, some turnips and carrots, a quantity of hay and straw, livestock, farm implements, and household furniture.

On 14 February 1856 an encumbered estates notice issued for sale by auction on 17 April 1856 of part of the lands of Carhue, including the sub-denominations known as Coultimorreghue & Keelteanagh, and containing c. 284 acres and a house and offices held in fee simple. The house and demesne were in the owner's occupation and the remaining lands occupied by one tenant, with both leases to expire following the sale. The lands were said to produce an annual profit of £221 16s. 7d., with the demesne containing mature timber, excellent lands suitable for pasture and tillage, and an abundant supply of water. The house had also recently been repaired. On 16 May 1856, a Memorandum of Agreement was noted between Thomas Stephen Coppinger and John Galwey of Fort Richard, Co Cork, affecting the lands of Oughteherrybeg, Carhue, Coultimorroghue and Keelteenagh, which were subsequently granted by the Commissioners to Thomas Stephen Coppinger by Deed of Conveyance dated 5 July 1856, in consideration of £5,525 being paid into the Bank of Ireland to the credit of the Estate of Henry [Thorne] Coppinger. In consideration of £3,000, John Galwey then released a charge over the lands by Deed of Release dated 26 July 1856. Thomas Stephen Coppinger then disposed of his interest in Carhue and other lands to George Charles Edward Colthurst of Dripsey Castle by Deed of Conveyance dated 14 August 1856, in consideration of payment of £6,750. On the same day, Colthurst by Deed of Mortgage and in consideration of £2,300 disposed of lands (including Carhue) to Peggy Colthurst of Dripsey Castle.

During the mid 1870s, John Good was residing at the property. Slater's 1894 Royal National Directory of Ireland refers to it as the seat of John H. Colthurst. Burke's Genealogical and Heraldic Dictionary of 1904 records George Colthurst (born 1811) of Carhue House.

Today, it remains a private residence, and is not accessible to the public.
