= Crooke's Castle, Aghavrin =

Crooke's Castle
- Aghavrin Castle, The Admiral's Folly
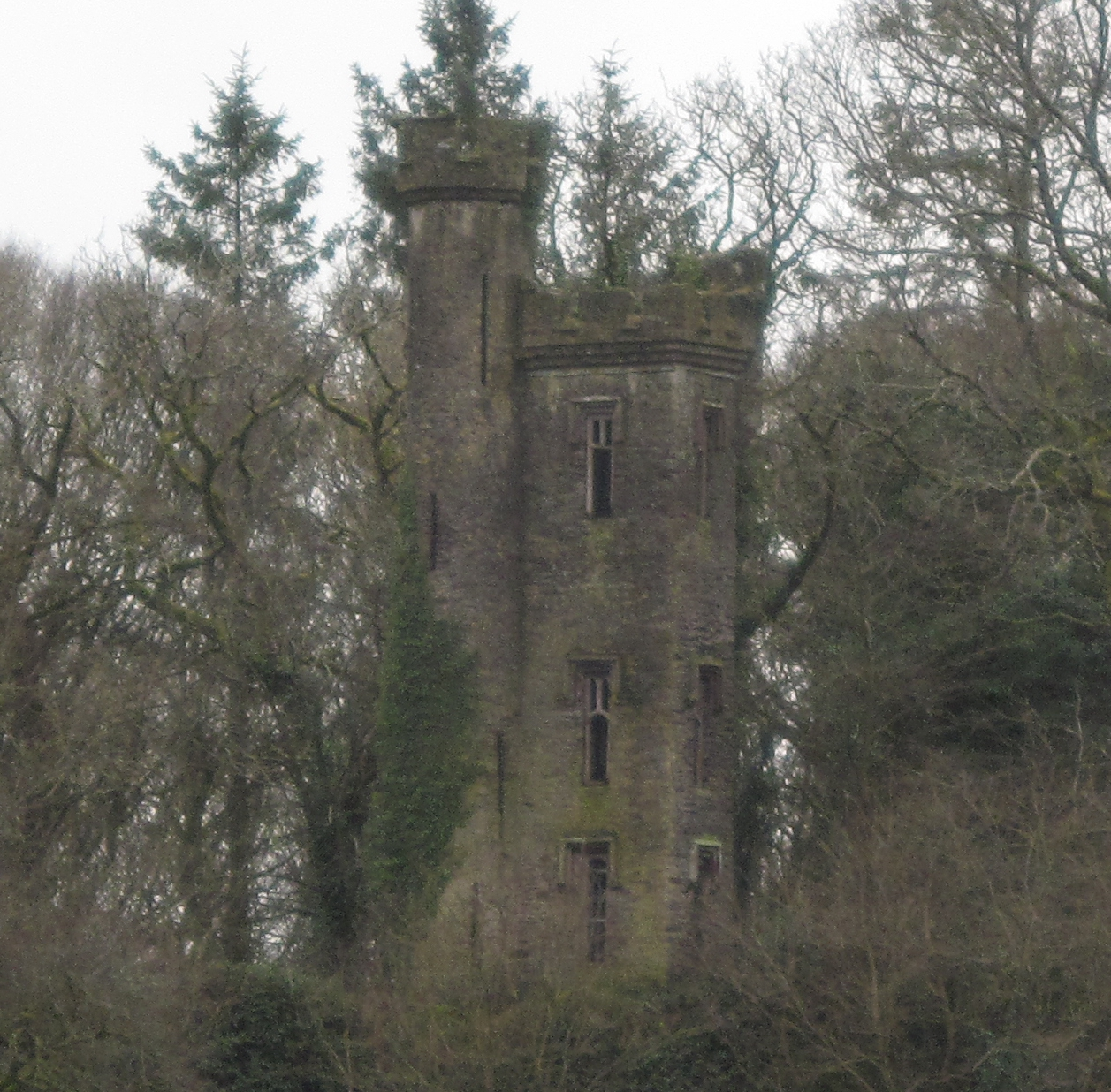
- Crooke's Castle in County Cork

- Location within island of Ireland
- 51°55′31.73″N 8°48′46.78″W
- Type: Ornamental tower
- Location: Aghavrin, County Cork, Ireland

History
- Built: c. 1820-40
- Built by: Commodore T.E. Crooke

Site notes
- Condition: Ruined
- Owner: Private
- Public access: No

Crooke's Castle is an ornamental tower or folly in Aghavrin townland, 4.8 km (3.0 mi) north-west of Coachford village, County Cork, Ireland. It was built in the early 19th century by Thomas Epinetus Crooke of nearby Aghavrin House, who served during the Napoleonic Wars, mainly on board HMS Shamrock, a Royal Navy blockade ship. It is included on the Record of Protected Structures maintained by Cork County Council.

The structure is referred to as a 'tower' located on Carrigaknubber Rock as per the 1842 surveyed OS map and named as 'Aghavrin Castle' in both the Ordnance Survey (OS) name book (c. 1840) and the 1901 surveyed OS map. The OS name book describes it as in the southern part of Aghavrin about 4 chains (0.08 km; 0.05 mi) north-east of the boundary with Rockgrove (townland). Locally, it is nowadays referred to as 'Crooke's Castle'.

Early Irish ordnance survey maps indicate structures named 'tower' often located in or around a country-house demesne. These were mostly built in the late eighteenth or early nineteenth centuries, and sited in prominent positions to act as 'eye-catchers', and to afford good views from the tower itself. Many were used for tea parties, when tea drinking became fashionable in the eighteenth century.

In A Topographical Dictionary of Ireland (1837), Lewis describes the demesne of Ahavrin as small but well planted, and refers to 'an isolated rock at its southern extremity' upon which 'stands a picturesque castellated tower, surmounted by a light and graceful turret'. The OS name book describes it as a tower or turret, built by Captain Crooke on Carrigacnubber rock, generally known as 'Ahavrin Castle', and referred to by Herbert Gilman as the 'Admiral's Folly'. The Archaeological Inventory of county Cork describes it as a ruined square three-storey tower (2m x 2m), having rectangular window opes with hood-mouldings, and an embattled parapet. It is also described as having a slim circular projection on the south-east corner with slit windows, rising higher than the tower, and also having an embattled parapet.

The Irish Tourist Association survey of 1944 states that it was erected 100 to 120 years previously, cost £100, and was built by Commodore Crooke of the British Navy. The survey holds that 'Crook's Tower' would be a more accurate description, and that it consisted of two narrow sections with the cylindrical portion slightly higher than the rectangular element. It was observed to stand on a high rock in a reasonably level country area, and a distinctive landmark from the road. It was partly ruinous but the circular staircase could still be negotiated.

The tower is not accessible to the public and is located on private property. A short distance to the south-west, at the foot of Carrigaknubber Rock, is a Mass rock, Aghavrin Mass Rock, which was used for worship during penal times.
