= Clonmoyle East =

Clonmoyle East Irish: Cluain Maol Thoir
- townland
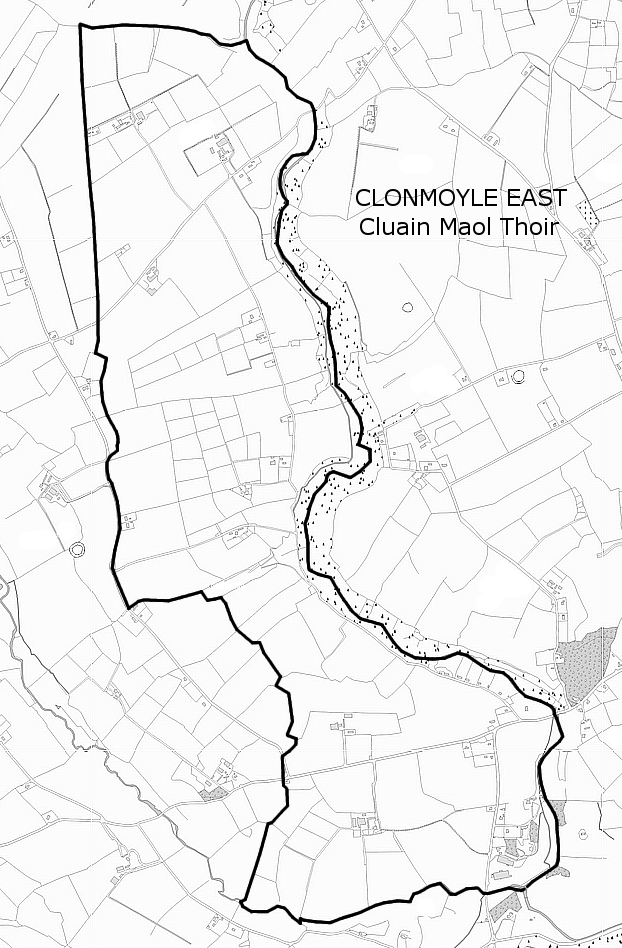

- Clonmoyle East shown within Ireland
- Coordinates: 51°56′36″N 8°47′8″W
- Country: Ireland
- County: County Cork
- Barony: Muskerry East
- Civil parish: Aghabullogue
- First recorded: Mid 17th Century
- Settlements: Aghabullogue, Coachford

Government
  - Council: Cork County Council
  - Ward: Blarney-Macroom EA

Area
  - Total: 305.96 ha (756.0 acres)
- Irish grid ref: W457771

Clonmoyle East (Irish: Cluain Maol Thoir) is a townland within both the civil parish and Catholic parish of Aghabullogue, County Cork, Ireland. The townland, which is approximately 758 acres (307 ha) in size, is situated east of Aghabullogue village and north of Coachford village.

== Name and history ==
Evidence of ancient settlement within Clonmoyle East townland includes a number of burnt mound and standing stone sites.

Derived from the Irish Cluain Maol or Cluain Maoile, the area is referred to as 'Clonmoile' in the Down Survey (Muskerry) map, and 'Clonmolye' with arable and course pasture land in the Down Survey (Parishes of Ahabollog and Aghinagh) map, with the terrier naming the proprietor as an Irish papist, Cormack MacCallaghan Carthy of the 'denomination of Clonmoyle', consisting of three ploughlands and c. 1,521 acres considered 'entirely profitable'. The present combined acreage of Clonmoyle East with the adjoining townland of Clonmoyle West is c. 1,530 acres.

The Ordnance Survey name book (c. 1840) gives the Irish language version of Cluain Maoile to the townland, or 'meadow of the hornless cow'. It was said to be the property of Rev. J.L. Pyne and Molly Davis, and excellent ground, mainly cultivated, with some bog and furze running through it. O'Donoghue (1986) holds the Irish version to be Cluain Mhaoil, meaning 'bare or bleak watershed', or possibly Cluain Maothaile meaning 'soft or spongy watershed'. O'Murchú (1991) holds the correct version to be Cluain Mhaol meaning 'the bare meadow'. The Placenames Database of Ireland gives an Irish name of Cluain Maol Thoir to the townland, with cluain meaning 'meadow' or 'pasture', and maol meaning 'bare' or 'flat-topped hillock'.

Townland population
Year	Pop.
1841	325
1851	262
1861	213
1871	159
1881	224
1891	146
1901	148
1911	144
2011	81

Earlier versions of townland name
Year	Form
1656-8	Clonmoile/Clonmolye/Clonmoyle (Down Survey)
1811	Clonmoyle (Bath's Grand Jury map)
1837	Clonmoyle (Lewis)
1840	Clonmoyle (OS name book)

== Built heritage ==
Notable structures in the area, mostly dating from the 18th and 19th centuries, include Colthurst's Bridge, Luskin's Bridge and Leader's Aqueduct. Cottage House, historically associated with members of the Pyne family, is also located in Clonmoyle East.

During the 19th century, Clonmoyle Flour Mills was operated by the Young family of Clonmoyle House. Clonmoyle House is described in the Archaeological Inventory of County Cork (1997) as an abandoned three-bay two-storey country house, depicted as rectangular on the 1841 surveyed OS map, but later remodelled and enlarged by the addition of bows to side elevations and rear hipped-roof projections. In 1837, when Samuel Lewis published his Topographical Dictionary of Ireland, the house was associated with the Colthurst family. Agriculture was said to have locally improved by Colthurst and other proprietors, who introduced a system of irrigation, drainage, and a culture of green crops. The tithe applotment book for the townland of Clonmoyle East (1823-1837) records "Charles Colthurst, Esq." as occupying 36 acres. Charles Colthurst was the son of John Colthurst and Jane Bowen. The Ordnance Survey name book of c. 1840 refers to a demesne on the southern side of Clonmoyle East, containing "Clonmoyle House and Cottage, interspersed with trees, some plantation and ornamental ground". It is described as a fine house with good offices, being the residence of Chas. Colthurst Esq., and with the River Dripsey bounding the property to the east and south. Griffith's Valuation of 1868 records Jonathan Bruce as occupier of Clonmoyle, with the lessor being Charles Colthurst. During the second half of the 19th century, the house was occupied by Henry Leader, builder of nearby Leader's Aqueduct and owner of a nearby furze mill. Leader possessed approximately 2,418 acres in County Cork during the 1870s. The 1901 surveyed OS Map depicts a remodelled Clonmoyle House and surrounding demesne, to include a gate lodge, pond and boat house. The Irish Tourist Association (ITA) survey of 1944 confirms Clonmoyle House as the residence of a Mrs Young, who "also owned nearby Clonmoyle Flour Mill". The survey suggests that the house had been erected approximately 150 years previously (c. 1800). The ITA survey describes the house as having an "excellently constructed interior, wide staircase and with the moulding of its doors and window shutters". The house was in ruin by the late 20th century.
