= Mullinhassig Wood =

Mullinhassig Wood Irish: Muileann an Easaigh Irish: Poll an Easaigh
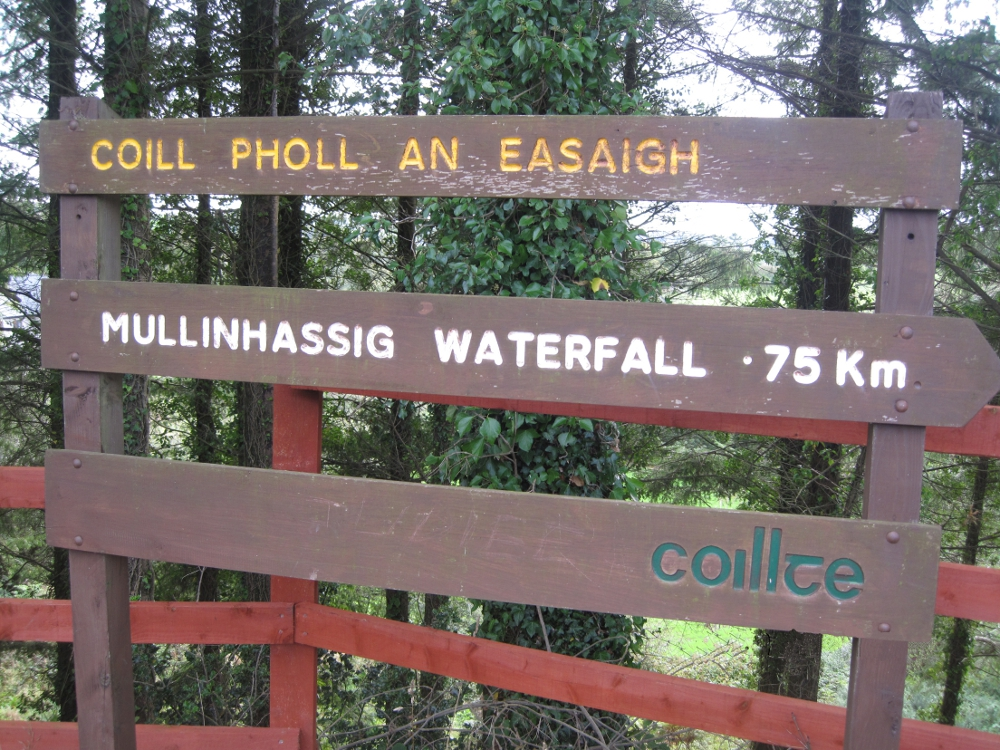
- Signage at Mullinhassig Wood

- Location within Ireland
- Interactive map of Mullinhassig Wood

Geography
- Location: Aghavrin/Shanavagha, County Cork, Ireland
- OSI/OSNI grid: W429753
- Coordinates: 51°55′38.38″N 8°49′45.32″W
- Area: 8 hectares (20 acres)

Administration
- Status: Open to public
- Owner: Coillte

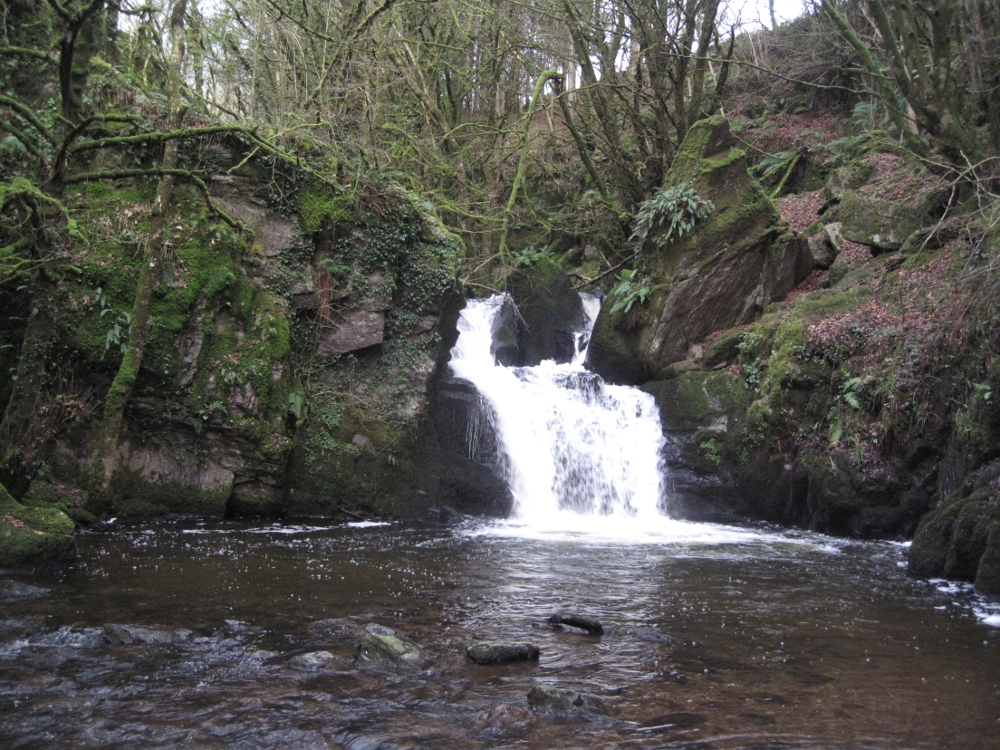
Poulanassig Waterfall

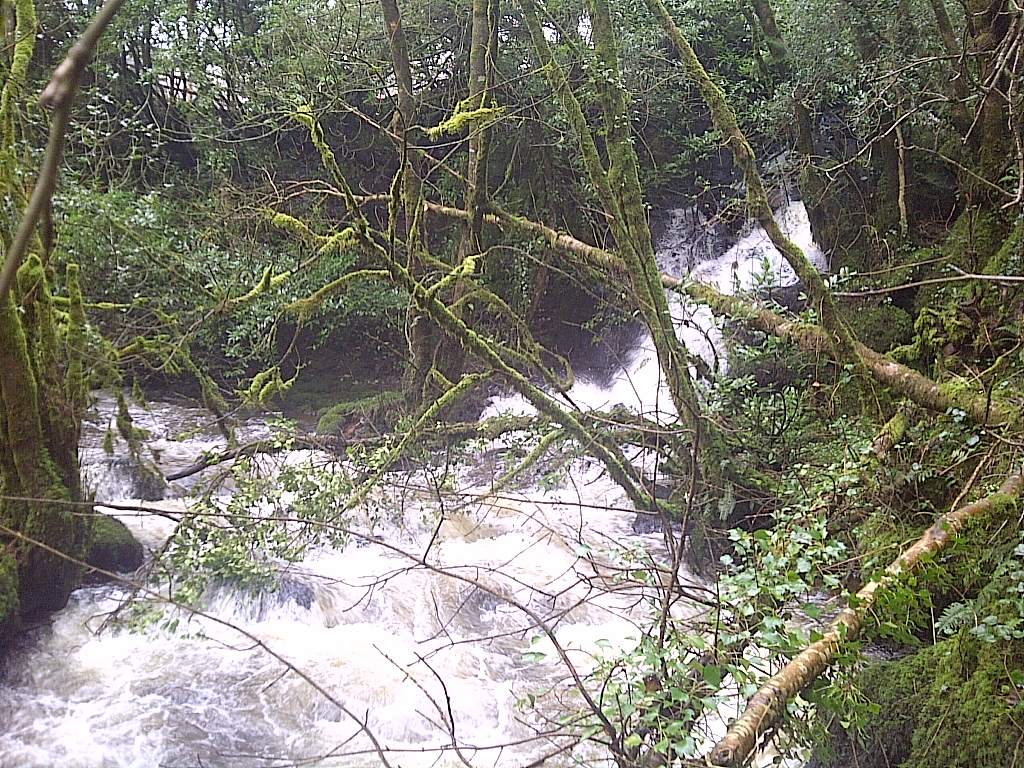
Mullinhassig Waterfall

Mullinhassig Wood is a Coillte-owned property, straddling the townlands of Aghavrin and Shanavagha, 4 km (2.5 mi) north-west of Coachford village in County Cork, Ireland. Poulanassig Waterfall is located within the wood, 0.75 km (0.47 mi) west of the entrance, and can be viewed from the water's edge, or from a path above. It is accessible to the public.

== Etymology ==
Mullinhassig is an anglicised place name of the Irish Muileann an Easaigh, meaning 'mill of the waterfall'. In A Topographical Dictionary of Ireland (1837), Samuel Lewis describes the glen of Mullinassig as having "beautiful and romantic scenery", its sides "adorned with wood, and at its head a little mill, below which the river forms a cascade and a little lower falls into a beautiful lake". The "romantic glen of Mullinassig" is also said to derive its name from a mill. Liam Milner (1975) describes the "lovely waterfall of Mullinhassig", also interpreting Muileann Easaigh as "the mill of the waterfall". This particular premises was a fulling mill, which in later times was converted to a creamery, and a private residence now occupies the site.

The 1842 surveyed OS map depicts a cataract, and correctly gives the name as Poulanassig. This is Poulanassig Waterfall, generally regarded as Mullinhassig Waterfall and incorrectly named on informational signage. "Mullinhassig Waterfall" actually adjoins the mill site to the north-west of Poulanassig, and is correctly depicted on the 1842 surveyed OS map. The 1901 surveyed OS map also correctly names Poulanassig waterfall, and refers to the glen as Mullinhassig.

== Waterfalls ==
Three waterfalls have existed in this area, and two remain (Mullinhassig & Poulanassig waterfalls). The Ordnance Survey (OS) name book (c. 1840) describes a small pond of water as 2 chains (0.04 km (0.025 mi)) north of Poulanassig in the River Clashgorrave, and at the mouth of which is (Mullinhassig) waterfall of about 18 feet. This pond was known as "Good's pond", as depicted on the 1842 surveyed OS map, and so named after the landowner who ran an irrigation stream from the pond to his land. The OS name book also describes a pond of water in the River Clashagorrave approximately 10 chains (0.2 km (0.12 mi)) south of Poulanassig, and, at its mouth, 12 foot "Poulachourane Waterfall". This pond was "Bowing's (Bowen's) Pond", constructed by Bowen of Oakgrove, with an irrigation stream leading from it to his land. This pond no longer exists and is now a wet, overgrown area, with a small stream running through. Neither does Poulachourane Waterfall exist, also depicted on the 1842 surveyed OS map.

The Irish Tourist Association survey of 1944 advises that (Poulanassig) waterfall is a thirty foot cascade of the Glashnagarriff River, and a "popular venue with visitors", and gives some local folklore. A mermaid in the form of a salmon is said to reside in the waterfall pool, who, if approached quietly in late evening, can be seen combing her hair on a stone "stool" to the left of the waterfall. If a stranger is sensed, she dives to the bottom of the pool. Near the brink of the waterfall is a boulder, said to be the mermaid's "table". Another version has the mermaid enticing unwary anglers to the bottom of the pool, where they spend the rest of their existence releasing fish from the hooks of fellow anglers. This is said to be the reason why no fish are caught there, though the pool is "full of salmon".

== Wood ==
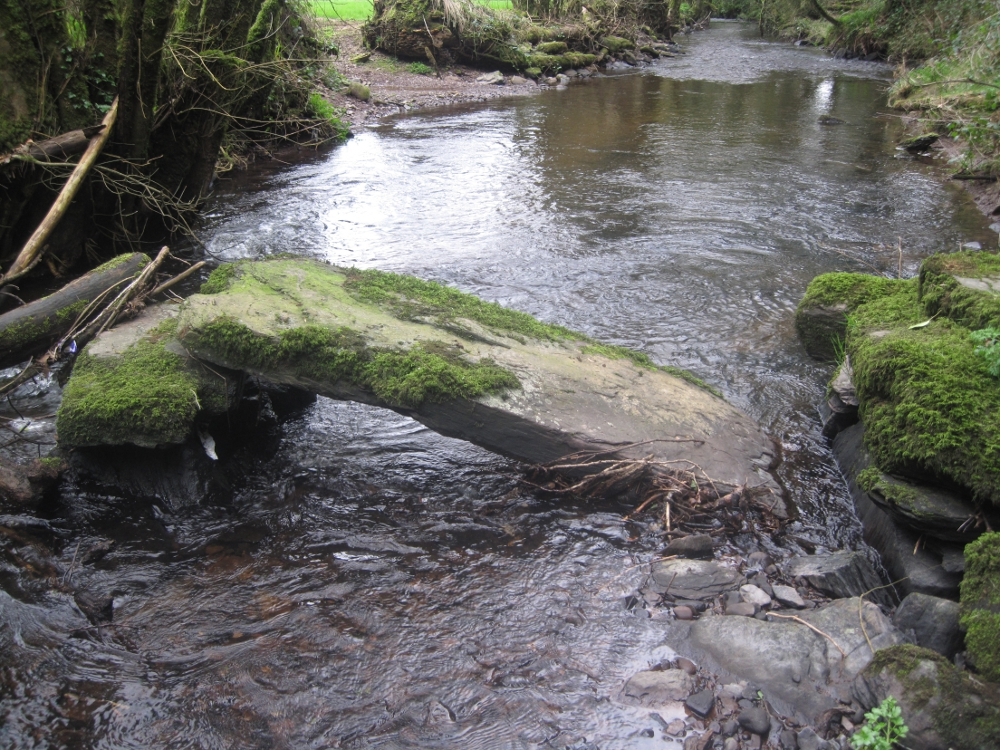
Clapper bridge at the eastern end of Mullinhassig Wood

Mullinhassig Wood, a forested Coillte amenity of approximately 8 hectares (20 acres), contains Douglas fir, oak, Sitka spruce and Japanese larch.

At the eastern end of the wood is a clapper bridge. Known locally as 'Aghavrin Clapper Bridge', this bridge crosses Glashagarriff River (Irish: Glaise Gharbh meaning 'rough rivulet') and is depicted as a foot bridge ("f.b.") on the 1841 and 1901 Ordnance Survey maps. Clapper bridges (from the Latin claperium meaning 'pile of stones') are composed of a series of stone piers or blocks, which support slabs, so as to form bridges. While the bridge appears to have been in use for many years, as of the early 21st century it had collapsed due to flood damage.
