= Dripsey =

Village in County Cork, Ireland

Dripsey An Druipseach
- Village
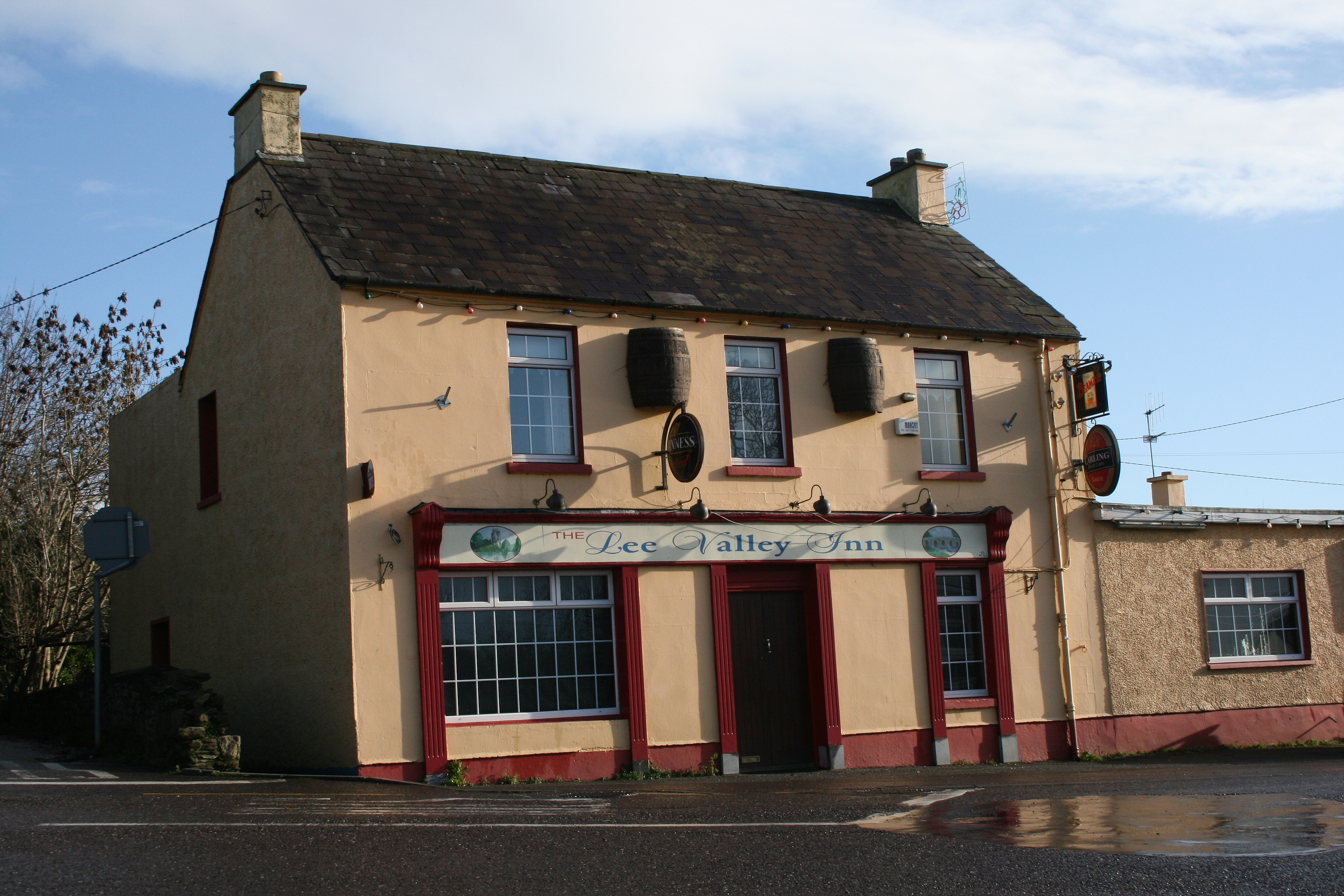
- Pub in Dripsey

- Location in Ireland
- Coordinates: 51°54′53″N 08°44′32″W
- Country: Ireland
- Province: Munster
- County: County Cork

Population (2022)
  - Total: 323
- Time zone: UTC+0 (WET)
  - Summer (DST): UTC-1 (IST (WEST))

Dripsey (Irish: An Druipseach, meaning 'the muddy river') is a village in County Cork, Ireland, on the R618 regional road around 20 km (12 mi) west of Cork City. It is situated on a tributary of the River Lee, the Dripsey River. It is in the Catholic parish of Inniscarra. The Dripsey area hosts a water treatment plant, the Cork offices of the Environmental Protection Agency, and an award-winning garden center. The village has one pub, a primary school and a pre-school.

== Name and formation ==
Dripsey's name is derived from the Irish name Druipseach, which means muddy river. The village is made up of the Lower Dripsey, Dripsey Cross and Model Village areas. 'Model Village' is the most populous part and the town, and is listed under this name in censuses up to 1966. Dripsey became built-up in the Model Village largely due to the woollen mills beside the Dripsey river, which eventually closed down in the early 1980s.

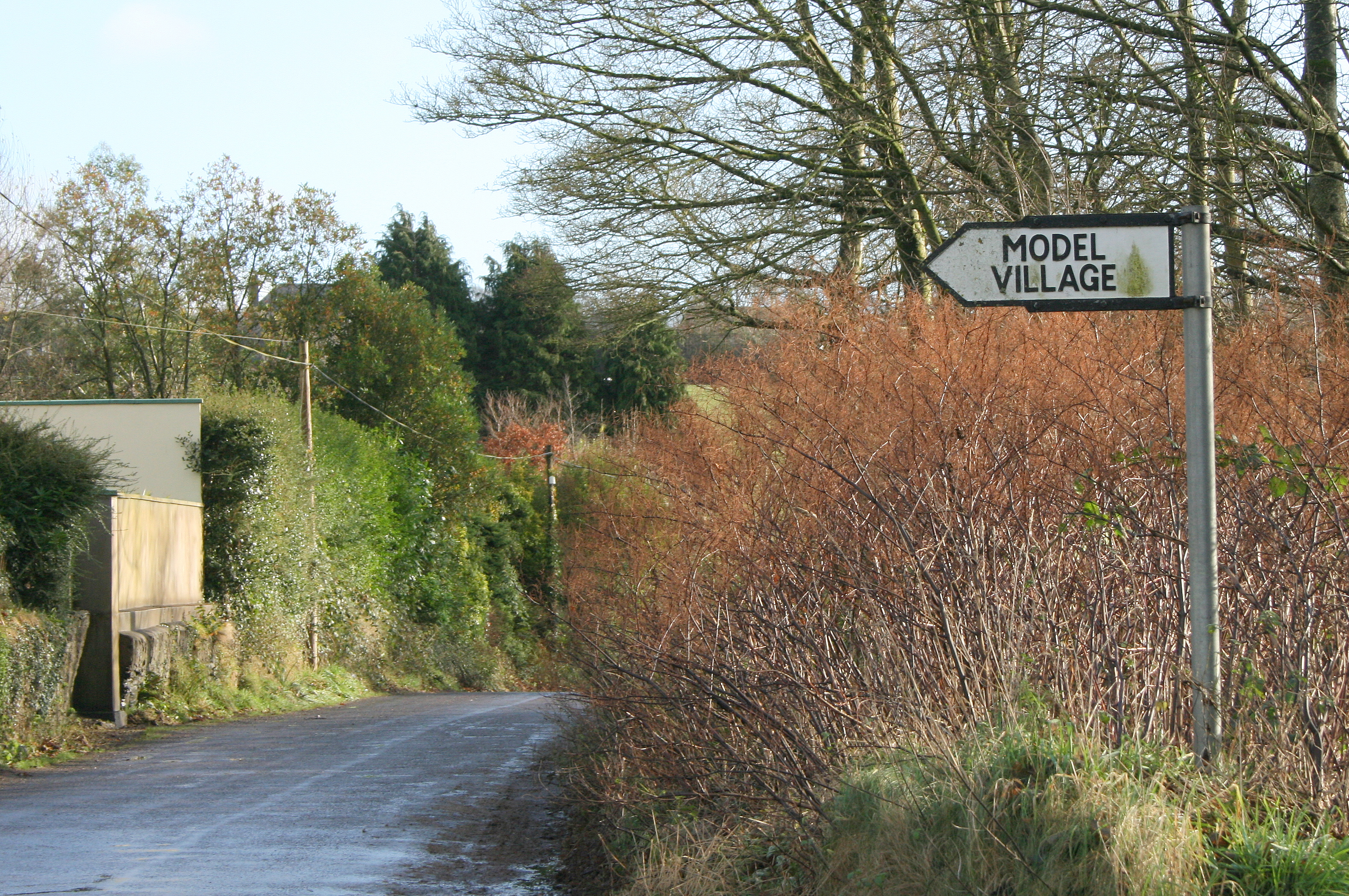
To the Model Village

== History ==
The village of Dripsey traces its foundation to the MacCarthy of Muskerry, who - in the 15th century - constructed a nearby tower house to protect their estate lands. The village saw later development when a paper mill was expanded during the 18th and 19th centuries, and a woollen mill established in the 19th century was converted to corn milling before expanding as a woollen mill again in the 20th century.

=== Estate and tower houses ===
Carrignamuck Tower House is a five-storey tower house located on the back road to Coachford. It was built in the 15th century as an outpost of Blarney Castle by the MacCarthy Clan of Munster. In 1650, Cromwellian forces under Lord Broghill attacked and captured the tower house. During the bombardment, the eastern wall was damaged. The tower and estate were purchased by the Colthurst family, who built a new house on the grounds.

The new house, known as Dripsey Castle or Dripsey House, is a country house located less than 100m from the older tower house. It was built in the 18th century by the Colthurst family as the seat of their estate. It was owned by the O'Shaughnessy family for much of the 20th century, and sold in 2015 to a 'UK-based buyer with Cork connections'.

=== Dripsey Paper Mills ===
Dripsey Paper Mills was founded in 1784 by Batt Sullivan. The mill became known for its quality paper, and contracted to produce Treasury Bills and Bank Notes for the Bank of England. In 1812, the mill covered six acres and employed 400 people locally. Many of these mill workers lived in a small village which grew up around the mill. Called 'Blackpool', this settlement consisted of sixty or so small cabins. In 1837, the mill was reported by Samuel Lewis to be:

"situated in a deep and well-wooded glen; the buildings are of handsome appearance, and the works afford employment to a number of persons, varying from 70 to 100, in the manufacture of large quantities of paper for the English market."

Passing through a number of owners, the paper mills closed in 1864.

=== Dripsey Woollen Mills ===
Dripsey Woollen Mills was built on the banks of the Dripsey River below the castle grounds by John Fielding and later Messrs. J. and D. Fielding built the factory building in April 1840. It was later involved with the local famine relief committee. The family was involved with Bluebell and Glanworth Woollen Mills.

Messrs. Daniel Lynch & Co. Ltd were the second owners of the woollen mills from April 1876. They represented the Irish woollen industry with 28 other firms when they exhibited at the 1883 Cork International Exhibition.

It became a flour mill and it was not until 1903 that businessman Andrew O'Shaughnessy purchased the site and reinvested in wool manufacturing at Dripsey. The Dripsey Woollen Mills provided significant employment in the area, with woollen goods such as cellular blankets, bed-spreads and tweeds being exported to the United Kingdom, New Zealand, Canada and the United States. As with the paper mill, a workers' settlement grew close to the mill, with approximately 70 houses becoming known as the 'Model Village'.

O'Shaughnessy later purchased a number of other mills (including Sallybrook Woollen Mills in Glanmire and Kilkenny Woollen Mills), establishing one of the leading woollen manufacturing businesses in the country.

Dripsey Woollen Mills operated until its closure in the late 1970s. The 'Model Village' and mill buildings are still present, adjacent to the River Dripsey.

=== Dripsey Ambush ===
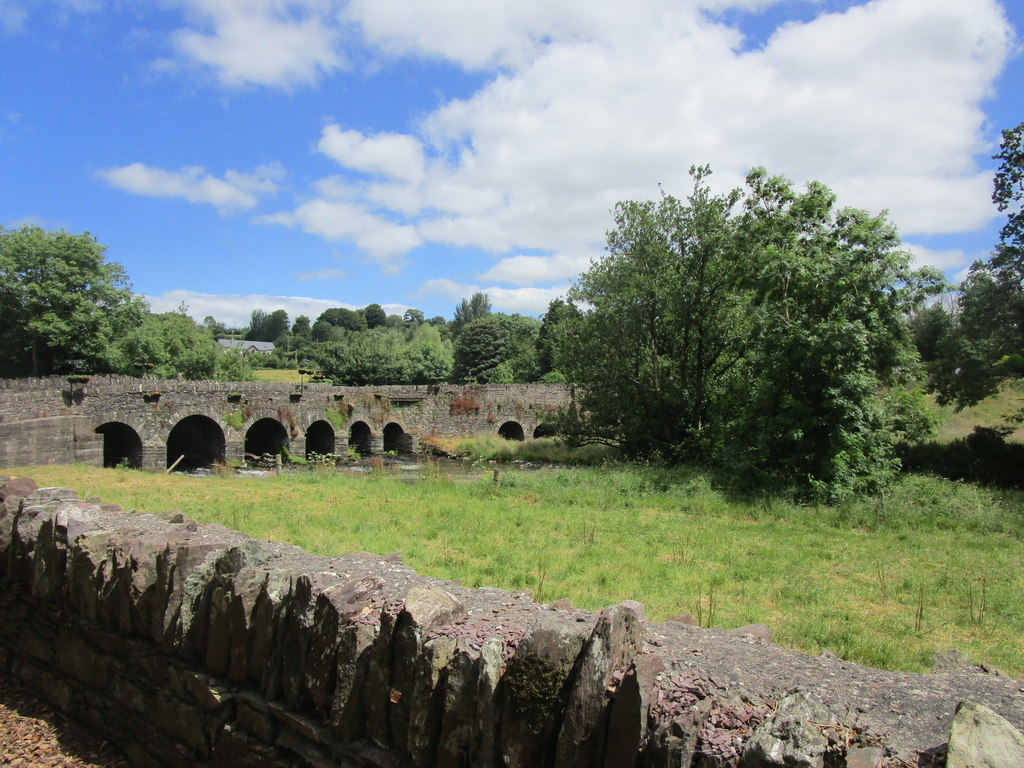
Dripsey Bridge (dating from the early 19th century) was damaged during the 1920s

There is a monument erected on the road from Dripsey to Coachford to the men who died after a failed ambush against the British Army during the War of Independence.

On 28 January 1921, in an area known as Godfrey's Cross, approximately half-way between the villages of Coachford and Dripsey, an Irish Republican Army (IRA) ambush party lay in wait for a convoy of British troops that regularly used the road when travelling between Ballincollig Barracks and Macroom. News of the planned ambush became common knowledge in the area, and one resident - a Mrs Mary Lindsay - travelled to the barracks at Ballincollig and advised of what she knew. The commanding officer, Colonel Dowling, decided to launch an attack against the IRA. Between 3pm and 4pm, a column of British troops left the barracks, and dismounted from their lorries at Dripsey before dividing into groups to surround the ambush party. The IRA had scouts posted, and one raised the alarm. The IRA officer in charge of the ambush ordered a withdrawal, but firing broke out. Eight members of the IRA (five of whom were wounded) and two civilians were captured and brought to Ballincollig barracks. Two of the more seriously wounded IRA men were subsequently moved to the military hospital in Victoria Barracks. Others were later transferred to the military detention barracks in Cork city, where they awaited trial by military court.

On 8 February 1921, the trial of eight of the ten captured men opened in the military detention barracks. The defendants included IRA Volunteers Thomas O'Brien, Patrick O'Mahoney, Timothy McCarthy, John Lyons, Jeremiah O'Callaghan and Daniel O'Callaghan. As well as two civilians, Eugene Langtry and Denis Sheehan. When the trial opened, the accused pleaded not guilty to the charges. The proceedings lasted two days. Volunteer Jeremiah O'Callaghan together with civilians Eugene Langtry and Denis Sheehan (both of whom had no connection with the IRA) were found not guilty and released. The remaining defendants were found guilty and sentenced to death. Of the two men still detained in the military hospital, Captain James Barrett died while still a prisoner on 22 March 1922. Volunteer Denis Murphy stood trial in Victoria Barracks on 9 March. He was found guilty and sentenced to death, but this sentence was later commuted to one of 25 years' imprisonment.

Mrs. Lindsay, the woman who alerted the military to the ambush, and a member of her household, James Clarke, were subsequently taken hostage by the IRA in an unsuccessful effort to obtain reprieves for the convicted Volunteers. In mid-March, upon the executions of the Volunteers, Lindsay and Clarke were killed by their captors.

== Sport ==
Dripsey formed its own GAA club in 2004. Before this people who would wish to play GAA in Dripsey would play with Inniscarra. This club, Dripsey GAA, won the County Junior B Championship in 2005. In 2009, Dripsey won the Junior B County final after beating Diarmuid O Mathunas in the final. Also in 2009, the club won the Junior All-Ireland final after beating Tullogher Rosbercon (of Kilkenny) in the final.

Dripsey also has a soccer club, originally formed as Dripsey Celtic AFC, which plays in the Cork Business League.

== World Record ==
The village of Dripsey is recorded in the Guinness Book of World Records at having the shortest St. Patrick's Day Parade in the World - measuring just 23.4 metres. This "shortest" St. Patrick's Day parade, went from one door to the next of the village's two pubs, The Weigh Inn and The Lee Valley. It continued for nine years (1999-2007) until the closure of The Lee Valley Inn.

== Notable people ==
- Andrew O'Shaughnessy (1866–1956), politician and owner of Dripsey Woolen Mills
- Tomás Ryan (b.1944), politician and hurler

== See also ==
- Dripsey railway station
- Dripsey Castle Bridge
