= Dripsey River =

River in County Cork, Ireland

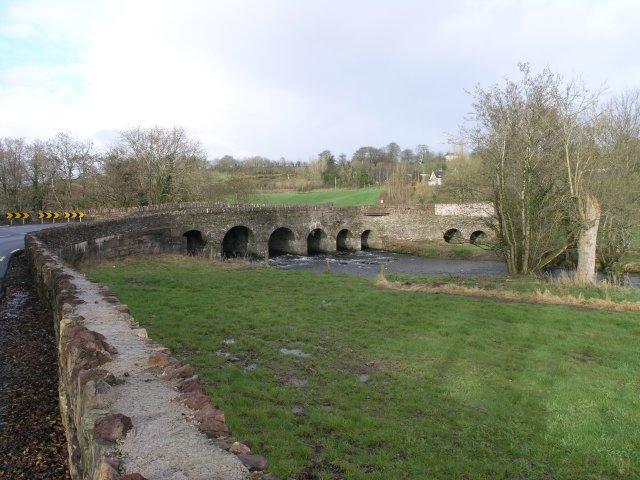
- Bridge over Dripsey River to the west of Dripsey village
- Native name: Abhainn na Druipsí (Irish)

Physical characteristics
- Source
  - location: County Cork, Ireland
- Mouth: Confluence with River Lee at Inniscarra Lake
  - coordinates: 51.91°N 8.71°W

Dripsey River (Irish: Abhainn na Druipsí) is a tributary of the River Lee in County Cork, Ireland. It rises near the Boggeragh Mountains and flows through several villages, including the eponymous Dripsey (Irish: An Druipseach, meaning 'the muddy river'), before joining the River Lee near the Inniscarra Reservoir.

== Crossings ==
Dripsey River is crossed by Luskin's Bridge and Leader's Aqueduct and Athnanangle Bridge, each in Clonmoyle East townland. The bridge at Athnanangle (from Irish Áth na nAingeal 'ford of the angels'), 2.6 km (1.6 mi) north-east of Aghabullogue village, is at the meeting point of Clonmoyle East and Killeenleigh. The Ordnance Survey name book of c. 1840 names it as Athnanagul. The bridge, which had been constructed by the beginning of the twentieth century, replaced a former river ford which is depicted as 'Athnanangle Ford' and 'Stepping Stones' on the OS 1841 surveyed map.

Milner (1975) describes Athnanangle as an ancient ford associated with St. Olan of Aghabullogue and St. Lachteen of Donoughmore, marking the meeting place and dividing line between their respective parishes of Aghabullogue and Donoughmore. The Irish Tourist Association survey of 1944 gives some local folklore, as to a 'misunderstanding' between the two saints on the question of division of parochial territories. St. Lachteen, believing a portion of his territory to be wrongfully obtained by St. Olan, is said to have remarked 'there will always be a robber at Aghabullogue', with St. Olan, considering his neighbour difficult to deal with, replying that 'Donoughmore will always have its mad dogs'.
