= Aghabullogue =

Village in County Cork, Ireland

Aghabulloge Achadh Bolg
- Village and parish

Irish transcription(s)
  - Derivation: Achadh Bolg
  - Meaning: "field of the bulge" or "field of the cow"
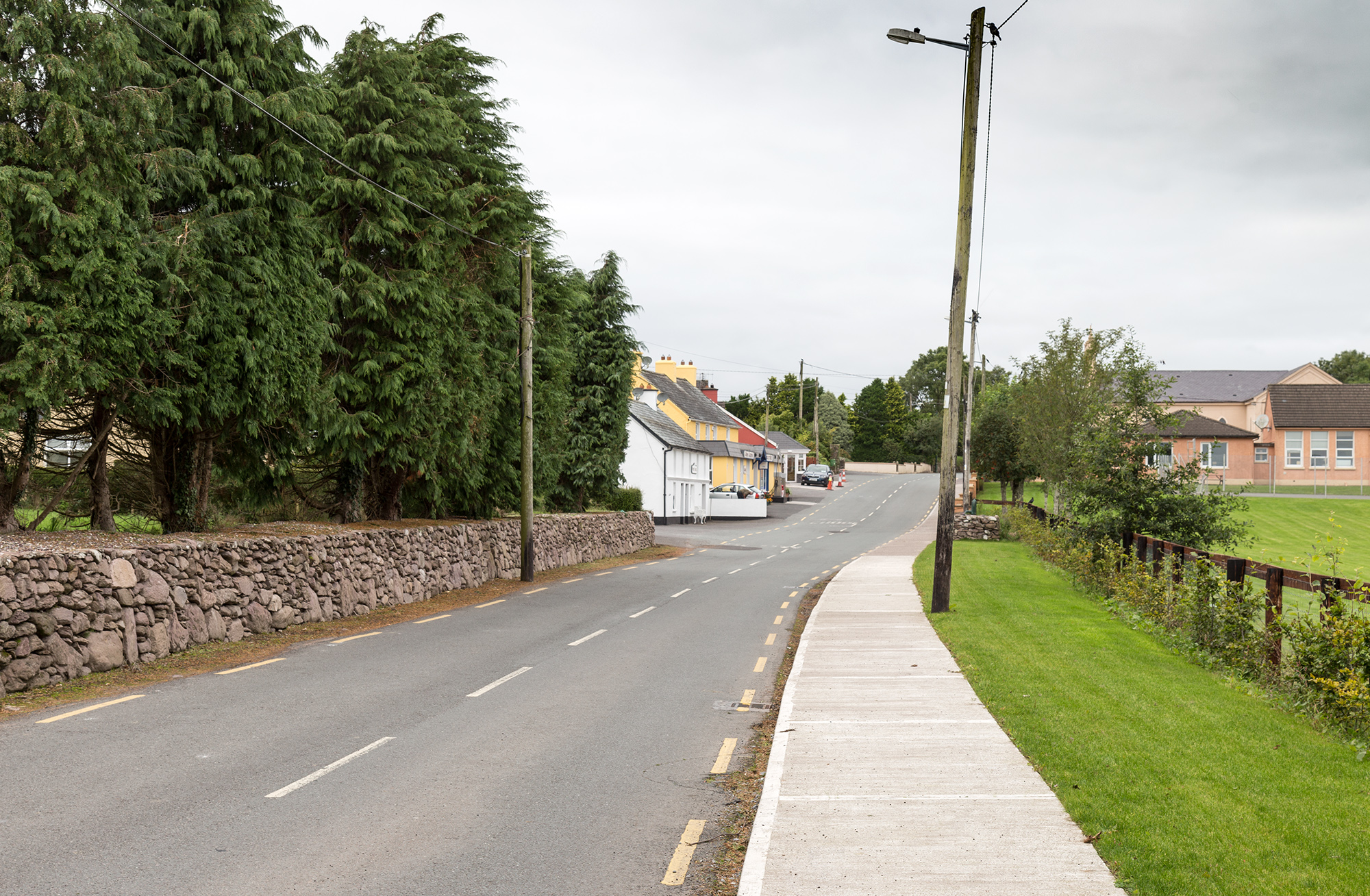
- Main road through Aghabullogue

- Aghabulloge shown within Ireland
- Coordinates: 51.945°N 8.808°W
- Country: Ireland
- County: County Cork
- Barony: Muskerry East

Aghabullogue or Aghabulloge (Irish: Achadh Bolg, meaning 'field of the cow') is a village and parish in the barony of Muskerry East in County Cork, Ireland. It lies around 30 km (19 mi) west of Cork City, south of the Boggeragh Mountains and north of the River Lee.

The parish of Aghabullogue includes the villages of Aghabullogue, Coachford and Rylane. The civil parish consists of 31 townlands.

It has a public house and shop, a national school, community hall and a Roman Catholic church (Saint John's Catholic Church). Saint Olan (or Ólann) is the patron saint of the parish.

The local Gaelic Athletic Association (GAA) club, Aghabullogue GAA, fields teams in Gaelic football and hurling. The club won Cork's first All-Ireland in 1890.

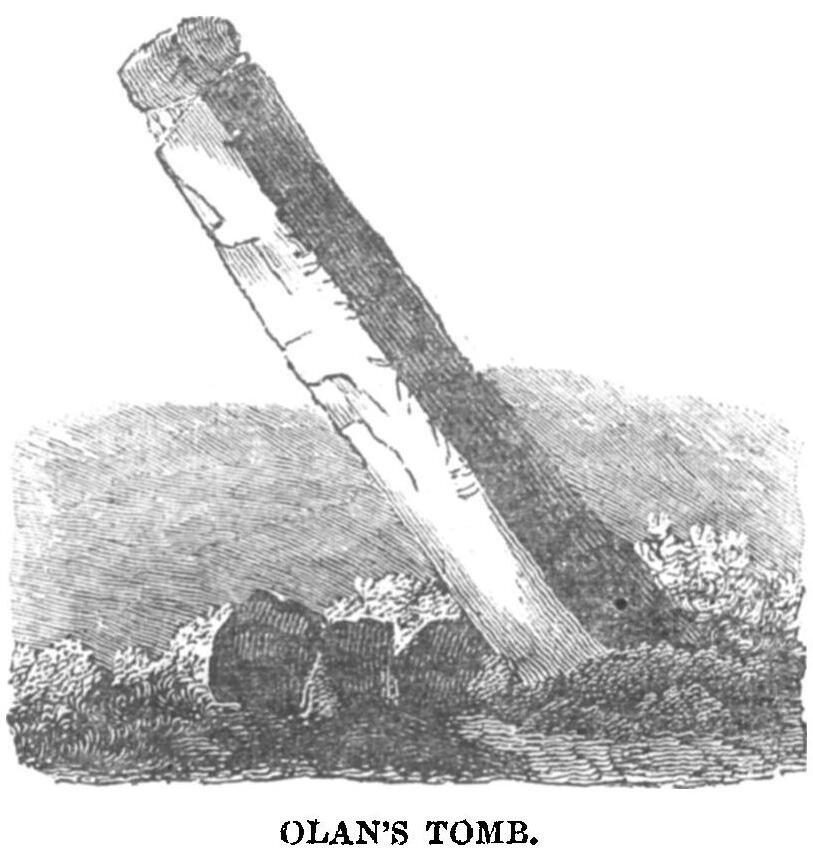
Olan's Tomb, Aghabullogue, East Muskerry, 1835, Dublin Penny Journal

== Notable people ==
- Dan Drew (1863–1923), All Ireland-winning hurler
- Peter Herrmann, social philosopher

== See also ==
- List of towns and villages in Ireland
