= Coachford =

Village in County Cork, Ireland

Coachford Áth an Chóiste
- Village
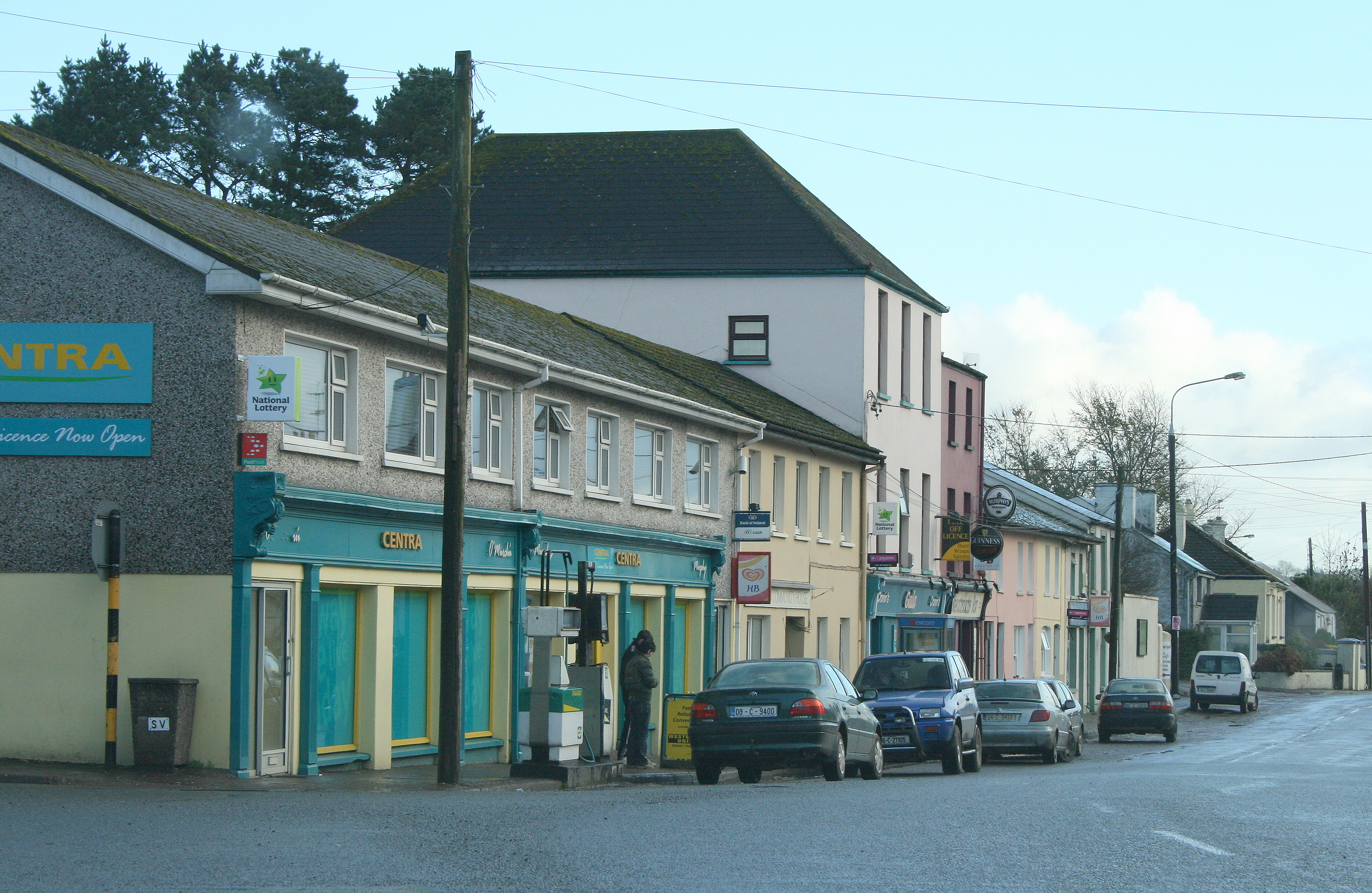
- Shops in Coachford

- Location in Ireland
- Coordinates: 51°54′34″N 08°47′18″W
- Country: Ireland
- Province: Munster
- County: County Cork

Population (2022)
  - Total: 450
- Time zone: UTC+0 (WET)
  - Summer (DST): UTC-1 (IST (WEST))

Coachford (Irish: Áth an Chóiste) is a village in County Cork, Ireland. It is located on the north side of the River Lee. The village is located in the civil parish of Magourney. Coachford is part of the Dáil constituency of Cork North-West.

Coachford owes its name to once being a crossing point over a stream for horse-drawn coaches, and this stream continues to flow beneath the village to the present day. The Lee was flooded for a hydroelectric power plant and farmland including many houses was flooded by the newly formed lake. Coachford is located around a crossroads where the R618 and R619 regional roads intersect. Mallow is 20 miles (32 km) north of the village, Macroom is 9 miles (14 km) west, Cork City is 15 miles (24 km) east and Bandon is 20 miles (32 km) south.

== History ==
=== Built heritage ===
Ruined former 18th-century Church of Ireland church in Coachford

Evidence of ancient settlement in the area includes a number of ringfort, fulacht fiadh and standing stone sites in the townlands of Monareagh, Clontead Beg, Clontead More and Derreen. A Church of Ireland church was constructed, in Glebe townland, in the late 18th century. This church is now in ruin, and a nearby (replacement) 19th-century Church of Ireland chapel is now used as a house. Coachford's current Catholic church was built c. 1840. The church buildings are included in the Record of Protected Structures maintained by Cork County Council.

=== 19th century ===
Coachford does not feature on the 1811 Grand Jury Map of Cork, but is mentioned in the Freeman's Journal, dated 10 January 1822, and the area and its environs were known as "Magourney". The village developed rapidly during the Great Famine (when it was a centre of relief within the mid Cork area) and subsequently. By 1888, the Cork & Muskerry Light Railway had a terminus at Coachford, adding to local business and accessibility. By the end of the 19th-century, the village also had a creamery, supporting its agricultural hinterland.

=== War of Independence and Civil War period ===
During the War of Independence, Mrs. Mary (or Maria) Lindsay, Leemount House, Coachford, an elderly widow, was executed by the Irish Republican Army (along with her driver, James Clarke), in March 1921. Attempting to prevent bloodshed she, along with a Roman Catholic priest, tried to persuade members of the Irish Republican Army (IRA) against a planned ambush. The IRA ignored them and she then warned the British Army of a planned ambush in nearby Dripsey, for which six IRA volunteers were later executed. She and her driver were shot and her home, Leemount House, burned down, after the British authorities refused to commute the executions of the six IRA volunteers. A character ("Lady Fitzhugh") based on Mrs. Lindsay was played by Dame Sybil Thorndike in the 1959 film, Shake Hands with the Devil, which starred James Cagney, Don Murray and Michael Redgrave. An IRA man named Frank Busteed later claimed "credit" for the killings and fire.

Near Rooves Bridge is a monument to Captain Tadhg Kennefick of the Irish Republican Army, who was killed during the Irish Civil War by the Free State Army. On his way home to his mother's funeral, he was stopped at a checkpoint where Free State soldiers tied him to the back of a truck near a hamlet called Peake and dragged him a distance of four miles (6 km) to the bridge where he was shot by soldiers and his body dumped in a ditch. Local people who witnessed this recovered his body. A monument now stands on the site where his body was recovered.

=== Later development ===
By the 1950s, a vocational school was established in the area. This school, known today as Coachford College (or sometimes referred to as Coachford Community College), operates under the patronage of the Cork Education and Training Board (ETB). The 2011-15 Aghabullogue-Coachford-Rylane Community Council commissioned URS Consultants to draw up a Village Design Statement (VDS) for the three villages in 2012. As of 2026, a new social housing development was under construction in Coachford.

== Sites ==
Approximately 3 miles (4.8 km) west of Coachford, off the Macroom Road, is Mullinhassig Waterfall. About 1-mile (1.6 km) south of Coachford on the road to Bandon is Rooves Bridge, constructed over the River Lee in the 1950s to replace the old bridge which was submerged due to the building of the hydroelectric dam at Inniscarra about 6 miles (9.7 km) down river. Rooves Bridge is the longest bridge spanning the River Lee.

== Sport and community ==
The village is the home of Aghabullogue GAA, best known for capturing Cork's first All-Ireland hurling title in 1890. The area is also home to an association football (soccer) club, Coachford A.F.C.

A local amateur drama group, the Coachford Players, was established in 1987 and performs a full-length play each year.

== Education ==
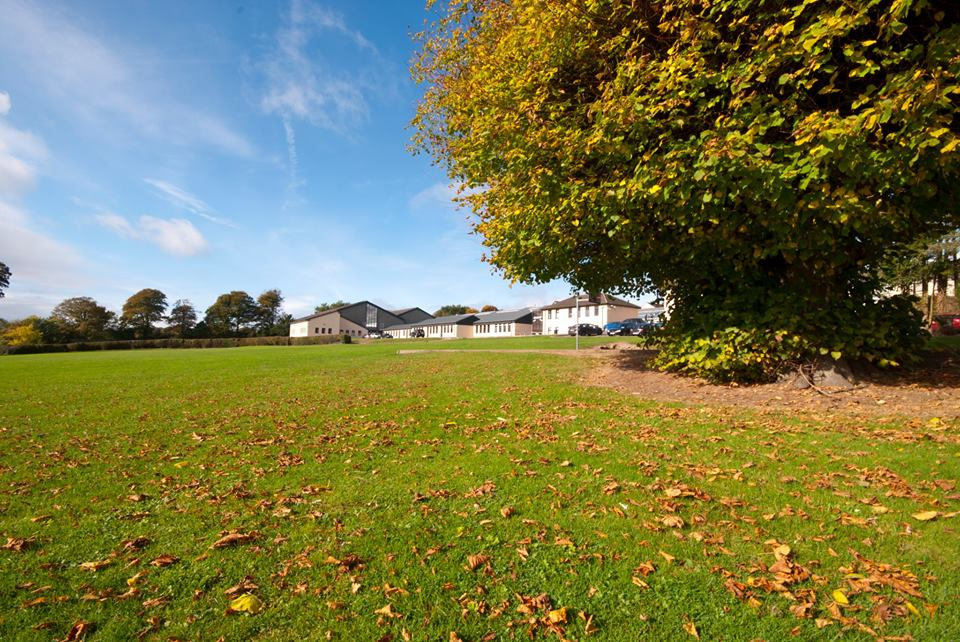
Grounds of Coachford College secondary school

The village and its environs are served by Coachford National School and Coachford College. The latter is a co-educational secondary school which, as of 2026, had an enrollment of approximately 850 students. An extension was completed in 2002 and provided the college with a sports hall. In October 2020, funding was allocated for the extension and refurbishment of facilities at Coachford College.

== Transport ==
Coachford was formerly connected by railway to Cork City with a narrow gauge railway, opened in 1888 by the Cork and Muskerry Light Railway. The line was closed in 1934 by the Great Southern Railways (GSR). Coachford railway station opened in March 1888 and closed in December 1934.

== See also ==
- List of towns and villages in Ireland
