= Finnery River =

Coordinates: 53°02′13″N 7°02′07″W

- Native name: An Fhionnúraigh (Irish)

Location
- Country: Ireland

Physical characteristics
- Source
  - location: Hillfarm, Narraghmore, County Kildare
  - elevation: 87 m (285 ft)
- Mouth
  - location: River Barrow at Ballybrackan, County Kildare
- Basin size: 89.1 km^{2} (34.4 sq mi)

Basin features
- Tributaries
  - right: Tully Stream

The Finnery River (Irish: An Fhionnúraigh), also called the Boherbaun River, is a depositing lowland river that flows through the county of Kildare in Ireland. It is a tributary of the River Barrow.

== Name ==
The Finnery River's name is first recorded as Feneure in The Civil Survey A.D. 1654–56, vol. viii county of Kildare. The spelling Finouse also appears, most likely an error. The 1752 Noble and Keenan map of County Kildare calls it the River Fennery, while Finnery appears first in the 1807 Civil Survey. The Irish language name appears in 1837 as Fionnabhair or Abhainn Fionnabhrach, possibly from the personal name Finnabair.

== Course ==
The Finnery rises in Hilltown, near Narraghmore. It flows westwards through the Bog of Allen and is bridged by the R418 road halfway between Kilcullen and Athy. It then flows under the R415 road, meets the Tully Stream and passes through Boherbaun, Harristown from which it gets its alternate name. The Finnery continues into Cloney, Kilberry where it bifurcates. The northern branch passes under the R427 road and drains into the Barrow at Derryoughter West, Ballybrackan. The southern branch enters the Barrow near Kilberry.

== Wildlife ==
The river is characterised by low flow rates, varying depths and a substrate that alternates from mud to sand. An area of riparian woodland, with mature tree species, forms the riparian vegetation along the river. The soil consists principally of poorly- to very poorly-drained organic soils and regosols either as separate entities or in a random inter-layered manner. The organic component has a variable thickness of peat (30 to over 100 cm) formed under relatively base-rich conditions, is occasionally underlain by shell marl (Chara marl matrix permeated with shell residues) 60 cm or more thick with a further layer of calcareous silty clay beneath the marl. The in-stream vegetation includes fool's water cress (Apium nodiflorum), water starwort and duckweed species in areas of low flow. Fringing the river is fool’s water cress, water dropwort (Oenanthe crocata), water mint, clustered dock (Rumex conglomeratus, soft rush, marsh-bedstraw (Galium palustre), horsetails (Equisetum spp.), ash (Fraxinus excelsior), willows (Salix spp) and silver birch (Betula pendula).

Brown trout (Salmo trutta) and salmon (Salmo salar) are the fish species most likely to be found in the Finnery.

== See also ==
- Rivers of Ireland
