= Woodstock Castle =

Castle in County Kildare, Ireland

- Caisleán Bhodastóic (Irish)
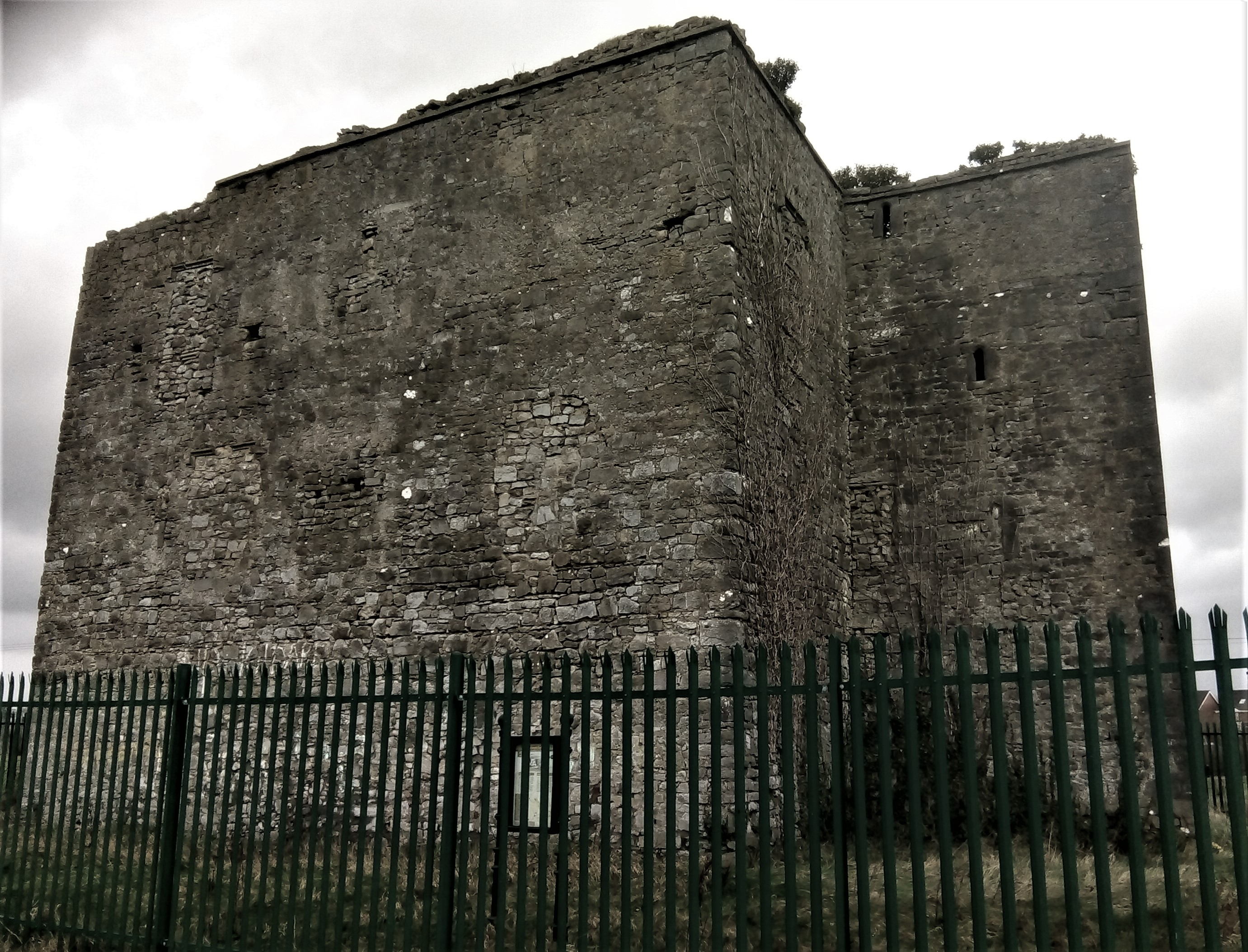
- West wall

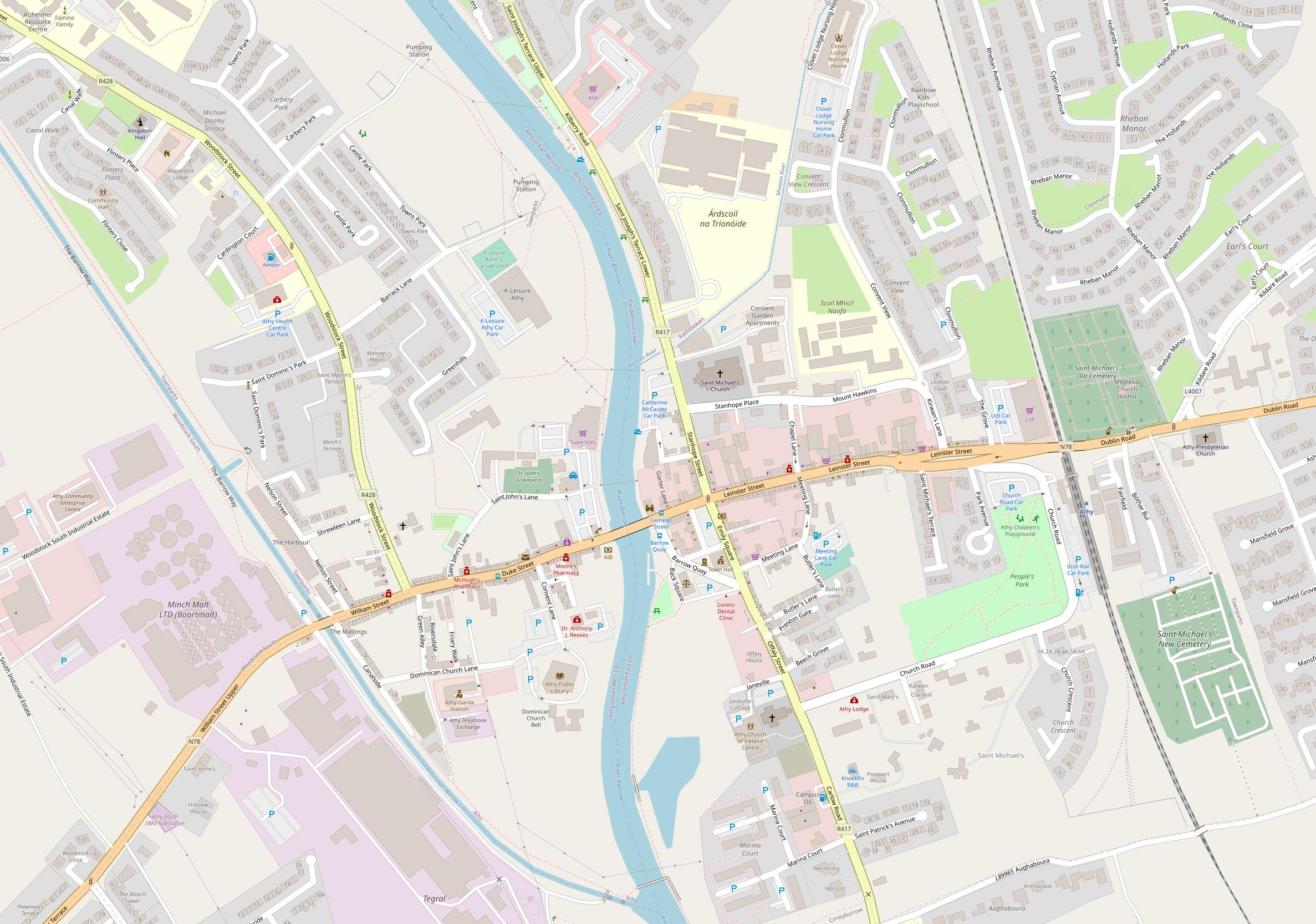
- Location within Athy Location within Ireland
- 52.996993°N 6.989586°W
- Type: Castle
- Location: Castle Park, Athy, County Kildare, Ireland

History
- Built: early 13th century

Site notes
- Architectural style: Norman

Woodstock Castle is a 13th-century stone castle located in Athy, Ireland.

== Location ==
Woodstock Castle is located in the north of Athy, on the west bank of the River Barrow.

== History ==
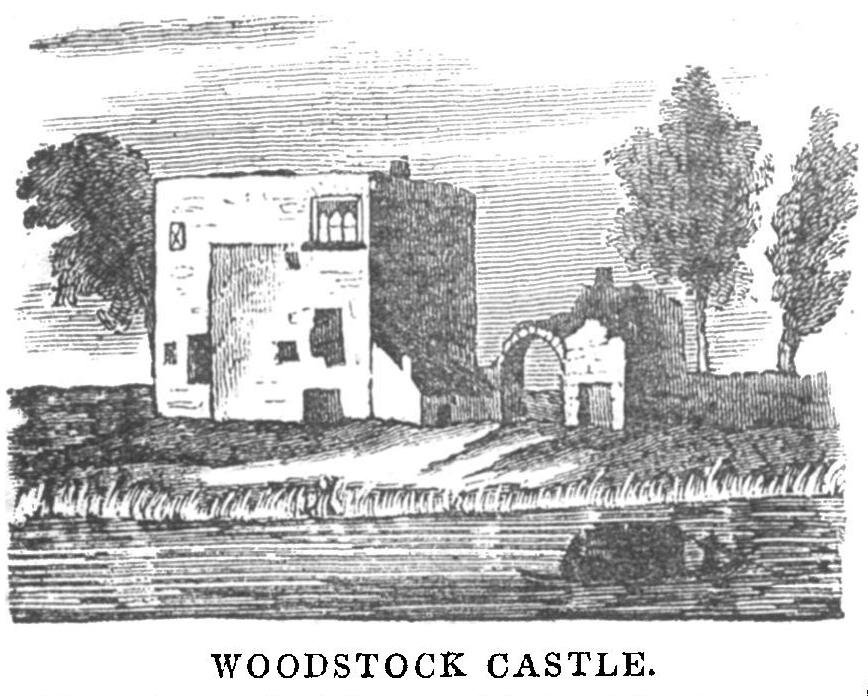
The castle, Dublin Penny Journal, 1835

Woodstock Castle was built in the early 13th century by Robert de St Michael, a Norman lord who was granted Rheban Castle and the surrounding area by Richard de Clare (Strongbow). It is sited near the "ford of Ae" (Áth Í) which gives Athy its name. Initially the fortifications consisted of earthen banks topped with palisades but these were later replaced by stone walls in the form of a hall-keep, a rectangular structure with a large hall and underground storage. The Crutched Friars established a monastery next to Woodstock Castle in the 13th century. On at least four occasions during that century the village of Athy, including Woodstock Castle and the monasteries, was attacked and badly damaged by the displaced Gaelic Irish.In 1417, John Talbot, 2nd Earl of Shrewsbury built White's Castle to guard the bridge, 620 metres (680 yd) to the SSW and on the opposite site of the river, and the centre of gravity of the town of Athy shifted to the south, leaving Woodstock Castle isolated.

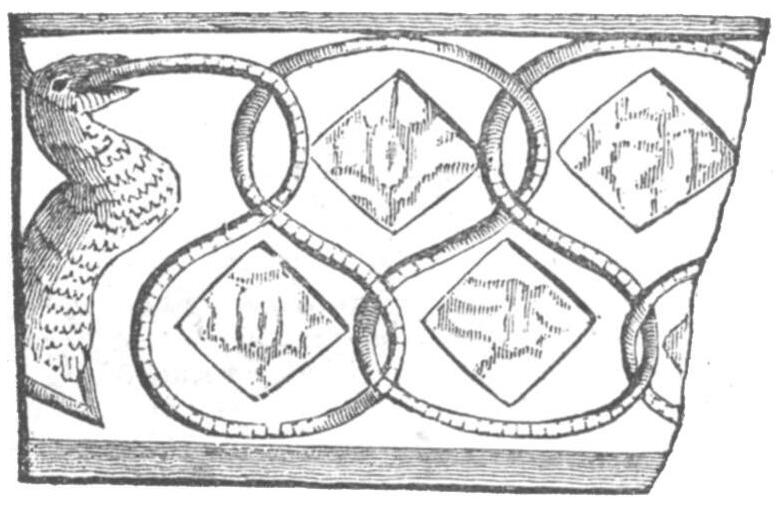
A stone found at the Castle

Around 1424, the castle passed from the Barons of Rheban to the Earls of Kildare when Thomas FitzGerald, 7th Earl married Dorothea of the Ó Mórdha.

In the 16th century the castle was altered, with a tower added to the southeast angle and, on the west end, a pair of circular gunports set within rectangular openings. Gunports of this type were invented in England in the 1520s. Also in that century, the walls were raised to add a third storey and several windows with hood mouldings were added. In 1530, Gerald FitzGerald, 9th Earl of Kildare garrisoned and fortified the castle.

Woodstock Castle was an important site during the Irish Confederate Wars (1641–53); originally commanded by Pierce FitzGerald, in 1642 it was taken from the rebels by James Butler, 1st Marquess of Ormond; it was in turn taken by Eoghan Ruadh Ó Néill in 1647, and he massacred the garrison. Murrough O'Brien, 1st Earl of Inchiquin retook Woodstock in 1648.

Local legend claims that a tunnel linked Woodstock Castle with White's Castle.

In 2015, magnetometry and electromagnetic induction surveys were carried out.

== Castle ==
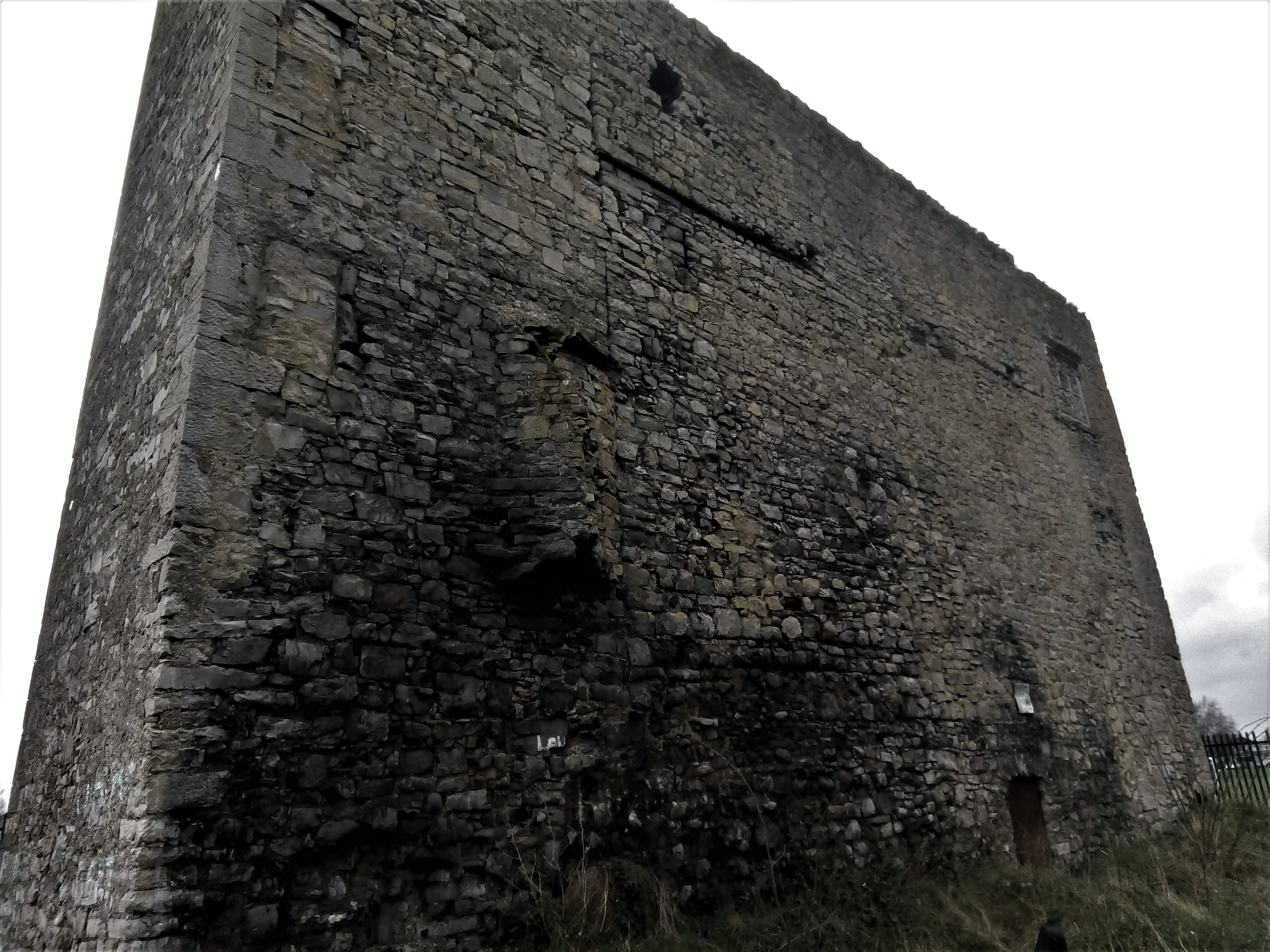
East wall

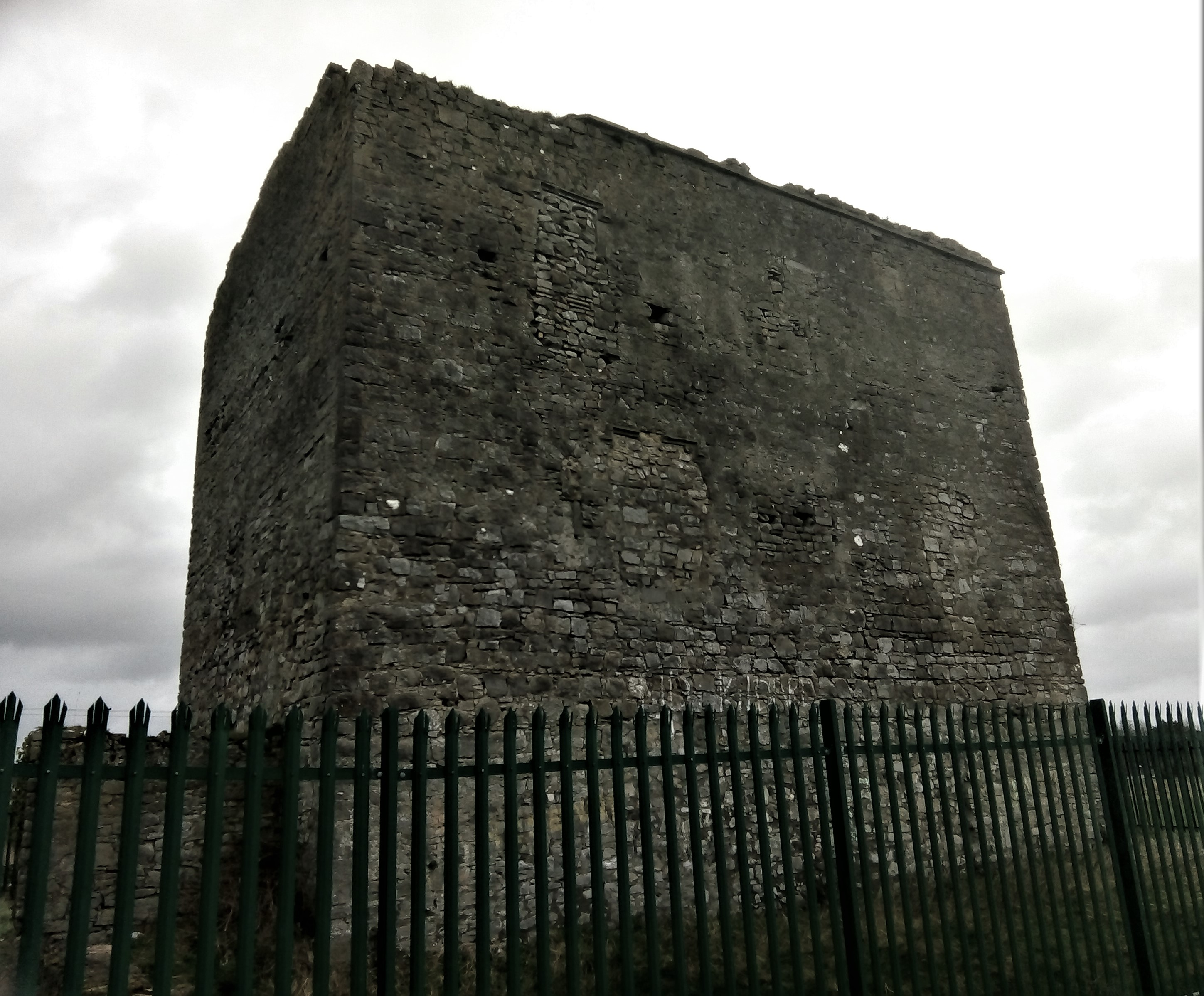
North wall

A tall stone castle of three storeys. It once contained a stone carving of a piper playing the great Irish warpipes; this artwork was later moved to Kilkea Castle.
