= Narragh and Reban West =

Barony (administrative area) in County Kildare, Ireland

Narragh and Reban West An Fhorrach agus an Réabán Thiar (Irish)
- Barony
- Interactive map of Narragh and Reban West
- Sovereign state: Ireland
- County: Kildare

Area
  - Total: 89.58 km^{2} (34.59 sq mi)

Narragh and Reban West (/ˈnærə, ˈrɛbən/, Irish: An Fhorrach agus an Réabán Thiar; sometimes spelled Rheban) is a barony in County Kildare, Ireland.

== Etymology ==
The barony takes its name from the village of Narragh (from Irish an fhorrach, "the meeting-place") and Rheban Castle (ríogh-bábhún, "king's bawn").

== Location ==
Narragh and Reban West is located in southwest County Kildare.

== History ==
Narragh and Reban West were part of the ancient lands of the Ua Tuathail (O'Tooles) before the 13th century, retaken in the 14th. There were originally two separate baronies, united by 1572, and then divided into east and west baronies before 1807.

== List of settlements ==
Below is a list of settlements in Narragh and Reban West:

- Athy
- Kilberry
