= Alexander Neville =

Alexander or Alex Neville may refer to:

- Alexander Neville (bishop) (c. 1340–1392), archbishop of York
- Alexander Neville (scholar) (1544–1614), English scholar, historian and translator, and MP
- Alex Neville, musician on Off the Black
- Alex Neville, character in BlinkyTM
- Alexander Nevill (priest) (1912–2003), Irish Anglican priest; Archdeacon of Ossory and Leighlin

== See also ==
- Alex Nevil (born 1965), actor
- Neville Alexander (1936–2012), South African activist
