= Athy =

Town in County Kildare, Ireland

Athy Baile Átha Í
- Town
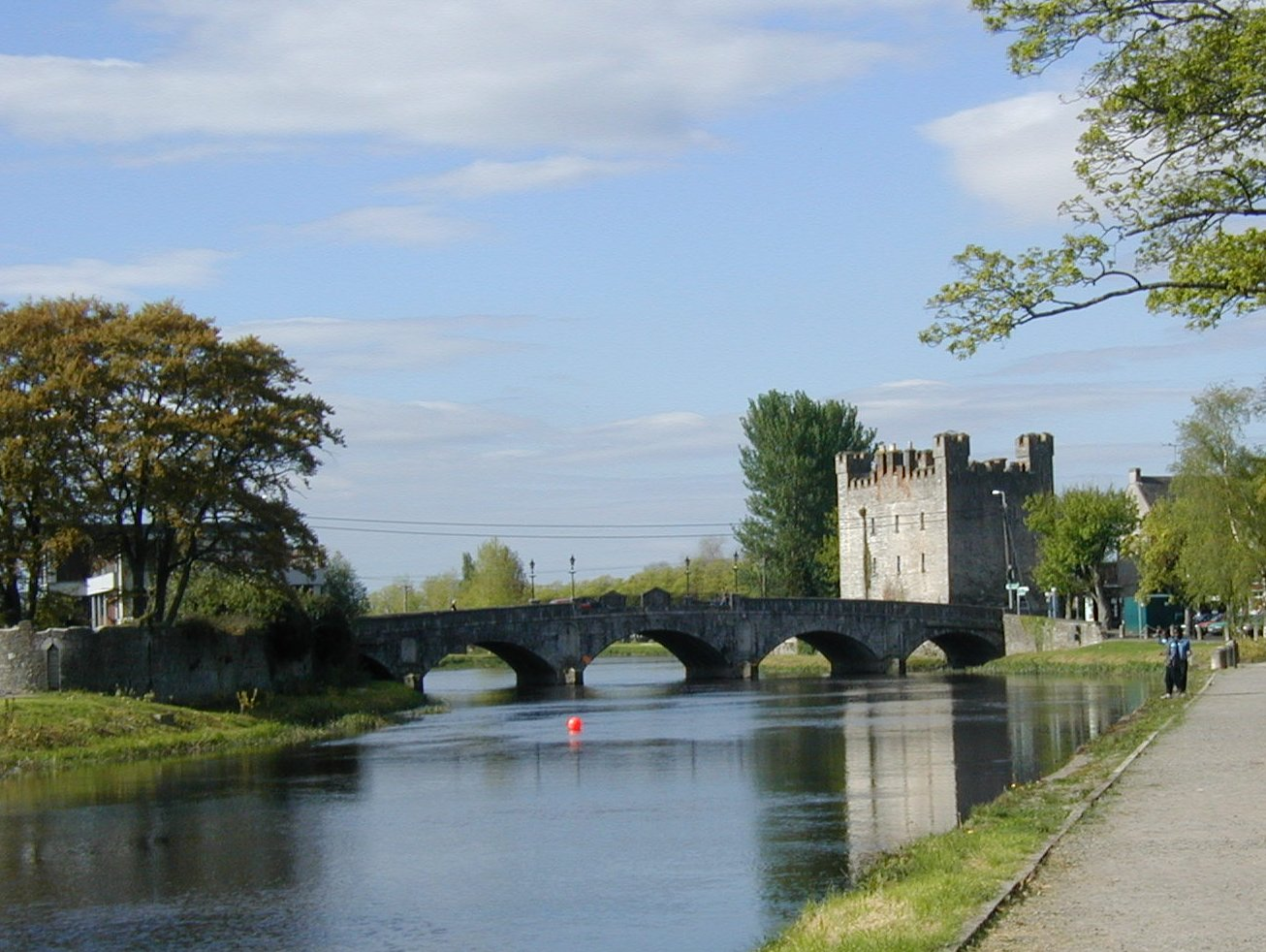
- River Barrow, Crom-a-Boo Bridge and White's Castle

- Location in Ireland
- Coordinates: 52.99197°N 6.98698°W
- Country: Ireland
- Province: Leinster
- County: County Kildare
- Elevation: 71 m (233 ft)

Population (2022)
  - Total: 11,035
- Time zone: UTC0 (WET)
  - Summer (DST): UTC+1 (IST)
- Eircode: R14
- Telephone area code: 059
- Irish Grid Reference: S680939
- Website: athy.ie

Athy (/əˈθaɪ/ ə-THY; Irish: Baile Átha Í, meaning '[town of the] ford of Ae') is a market town at the meeting of the River Barrow and the Grand Canal in south-west County Kildare, Ireland, 72 kilometres southwest of Dublin. A population of 11,035 (as of the 2022 census) made it the sixth largest town in Kildare and the 45th largest in the Republic of Ireland, a growth of 82% since the 2002 census.

== Name ==
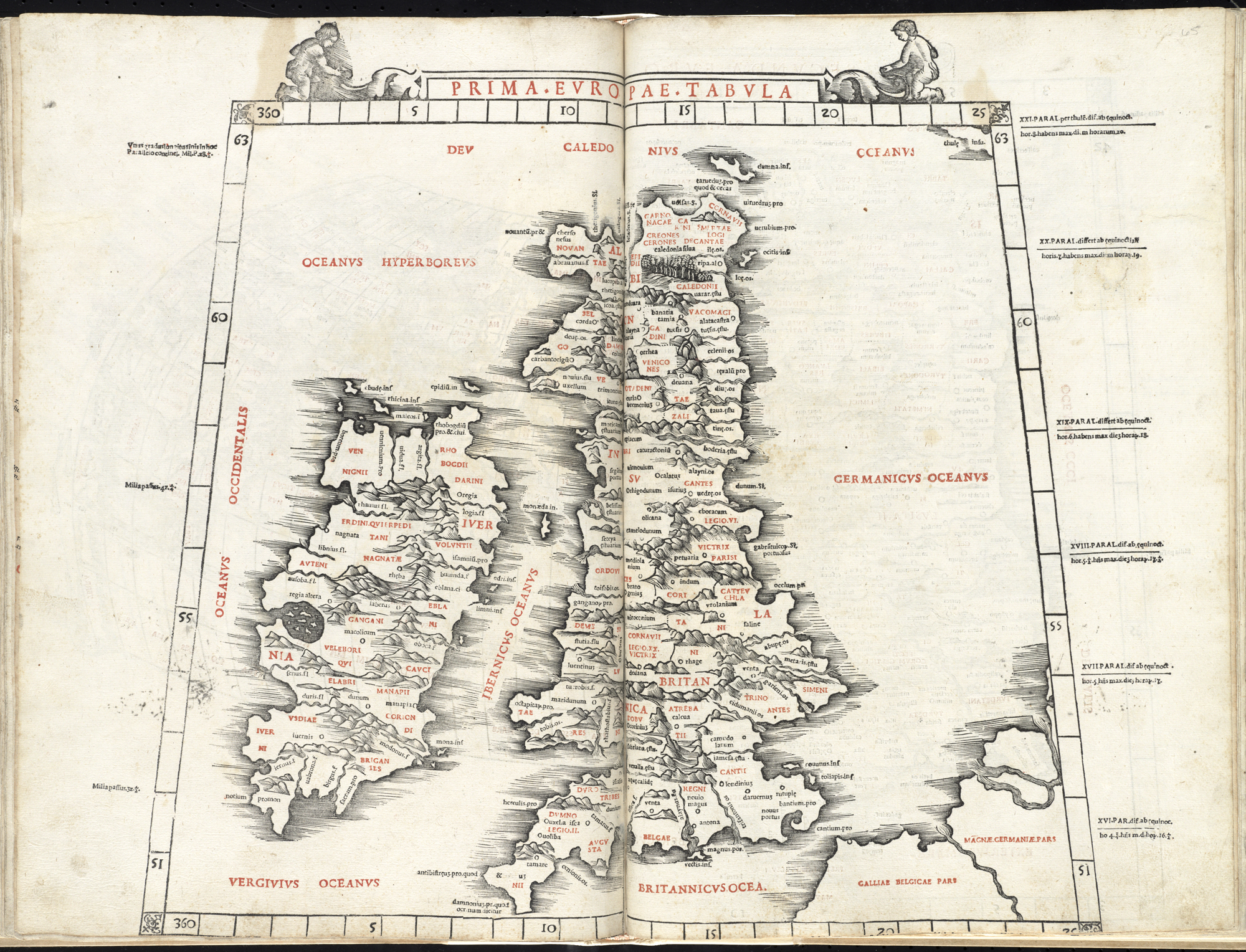
Ptolemy's map

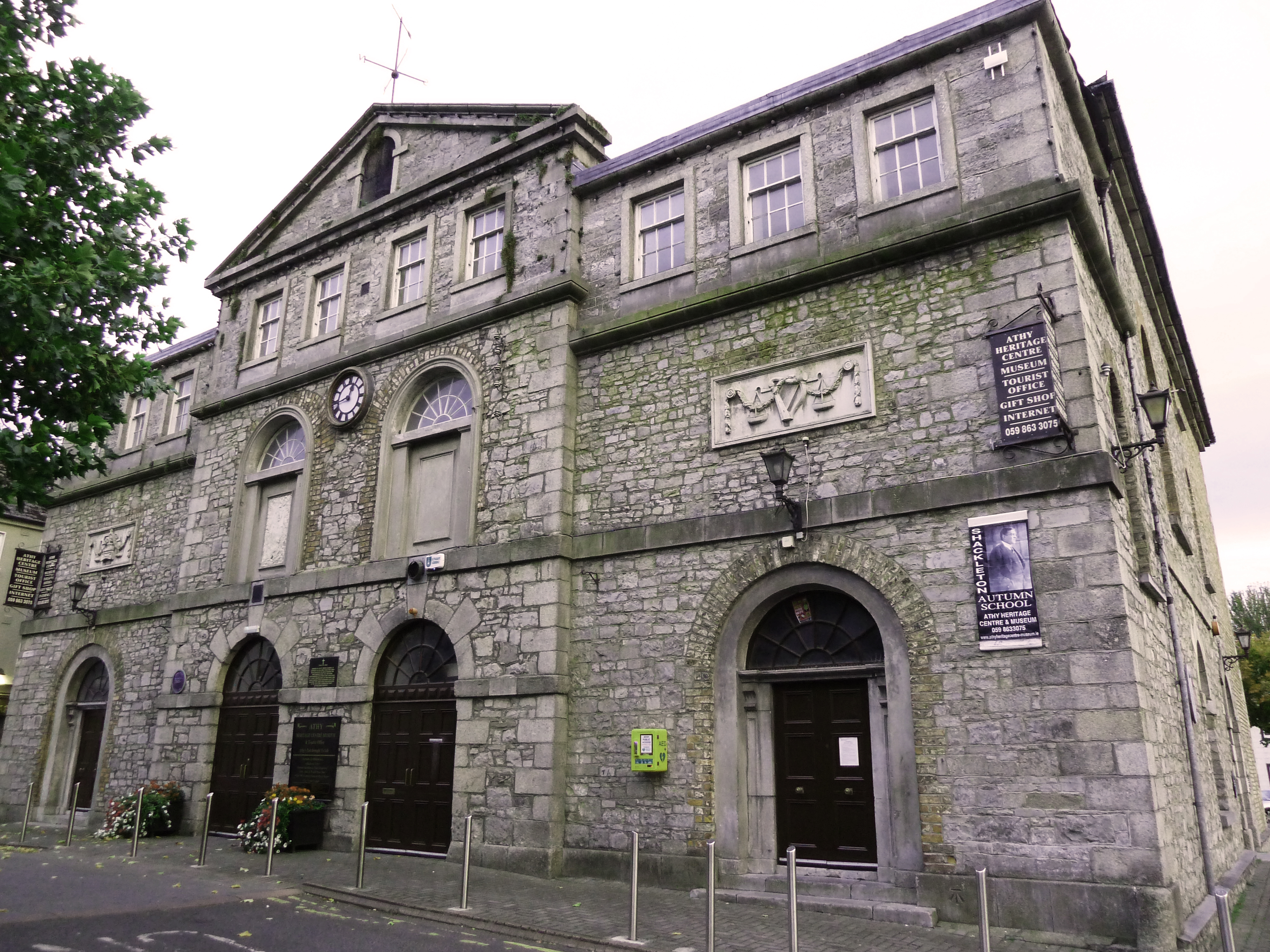
Athy Town Hall

Athy or Baile Átha Í is named after a 2nd-century Celtic chieftain, Ae, who is said to have been killed on the river crossing, thus giving the town its name "the town of Ae's ford".

The Letters of the Ordnance Survey (1837) note that "The town is now called by the few old people who speak Irish there and in the Queen's County [Laois], "baile átha Aoi", pronounced Blahéé", where éé stands for English 'ee' [i:] as clarified by a note written in pencil in Irish as Blá thí.

== History ==
According to Elizabethan historian William Camden, Ptolemy's map of Ireland circa 150 AD names the Rheban district along the River Barrow as Ῥαίβα. Modern cartography, however, dismisses the claim by using triangulation and flocking algorithms. This method establishes that Ptolemy's Ῥαίβα was actually located at Rathcroghan, the traditional capital of the Connachta.

A castle existed at Rheban from the Norman period onward.

The town at Athy developed from a 12th-century Anglo-Norman settlement to an important stronghold on the local estates of the FitzGerald earls of Kildare, who built and owned the town for centuries.

Athy Priory, a Dominican monastery, was founded in 1253.

The Confederate Wars of the 1640s were played out in many arenas throughout Ireland, and Athy—for a period of eight years—was one of the centres of war involving the Royalists, Parliamentarians and the Confederates. The town was bombarded by cannon fire many times and the Dominican Monastery, the local castles and the town's bridge (dating from 1417) all succumbed to the destructive forces of the cannonball. The current bridge, the Crom-a-Boo Bridge, was built in 1796, with the foundation stone laid by the Duke of Leinster.

The first town charter dates from 1515 and Athy Town Hall was constructed in around 1745. The completion of the Grand Canal in 1791, linking here with the River Barrow, and the arrival of the railway in 1846, illustrate the importance of the town as a commercial centre. From early on in its history Athy was a garrison town loyal to the Crown. English garrisons stayed in the barracks in Barrack Lane after the Crimean War and contributed greatly to the town's commerce. Home for centuries to English soldiers, Athy gave more volunteer soldiers to the Great War of 1914–18 than any other town of similar size in Ireland.

=== Centre of Hiberno-English ===
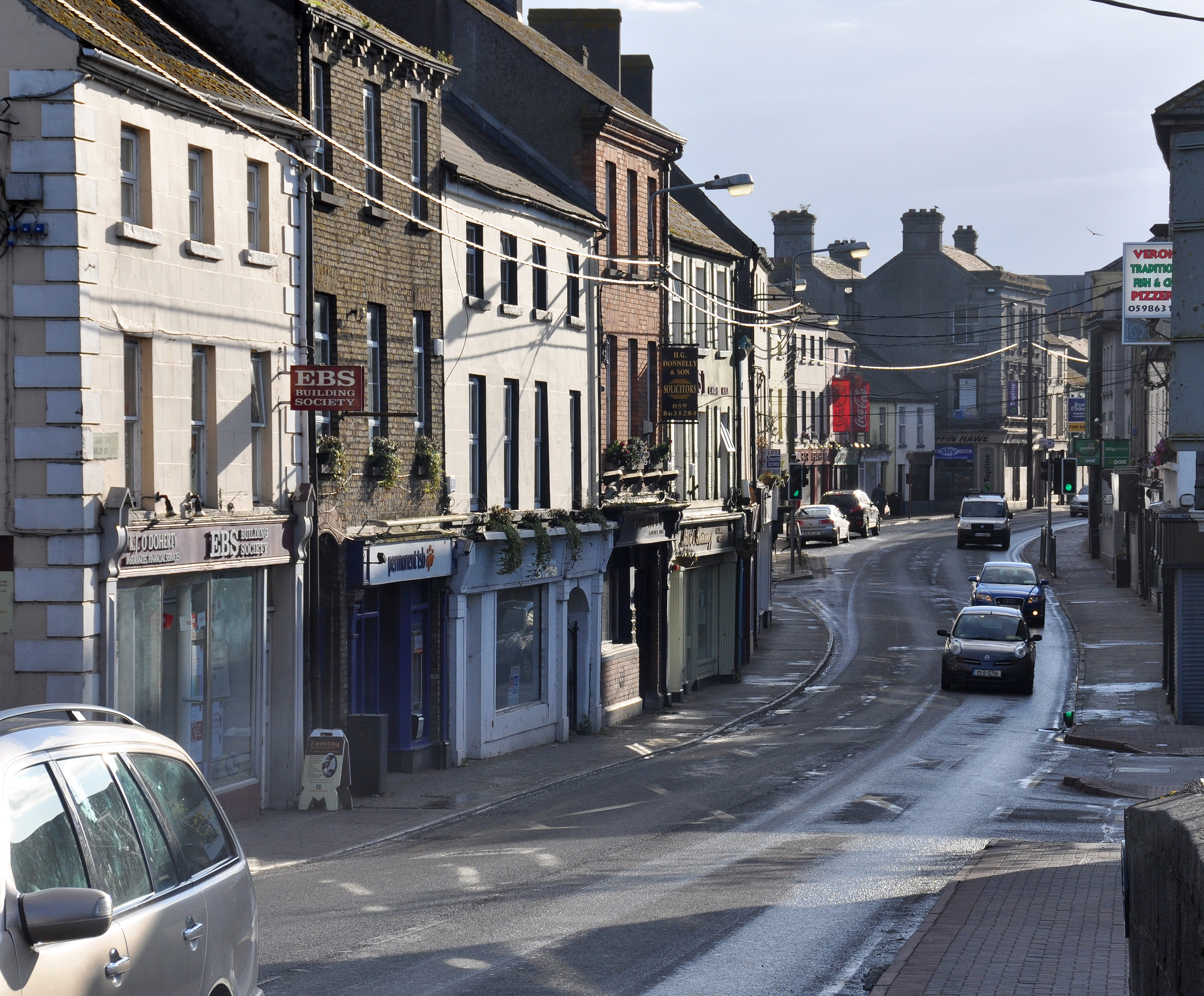
Duke Street

Athy has evolved as a centre for Hiberno-English, the mix of the Irish and English language traditions. A dialect starting with old Irish beginnings, evolved through Norman and English influences, dominated by a church whose first language was Latin and educated through Irish. Athy in particular was a mixing pot of languages that led to modern Hiberno-English. Positioned at the edge of the Pale, sandwiched between the Irish and English speaking partitions, Athy traded language between the landed gentry, the middle class merchants, the English working class garrison soldiers and the local peasantry. Many locals words borrow from the Irish tradition, such as "bokety", "fooster" or "sleeveen", while words like "kip", "cop-on" or even "grinds" have their origins in Old or Middle English.

This tradition of spoken word led to a lyrical approach to composition and perhaps explains the disproportionate number of writers Athy has produced. Athy becomes subject and object of creative endeavours – the traditional folk song, "Johnny I Hardly Knew Ye", is a prime example. Other songs in this tradition include "Lanigan's Ball" and "Maid of Athy". Another song of note from the area is called "The Curragh Of Kildare", the first song collected by Robbie Burns. Athy is also the surname of a minor character in James Joyce's Portrait of the Artist as a Young Man, who tells Stephen Dedalus, the protagonist, that they both have strange surnames and makes a joke about County Kildare being like a pair of breeches because it has Athy in it. Patrick Kavanagh alludes to Athy in his poem Lines Written on a Seat on the Grand Canal, Dublin: "And look! a barge comes bringing from Athy / And other far-flung towns mythologies."

=== Birth of motor racing ===
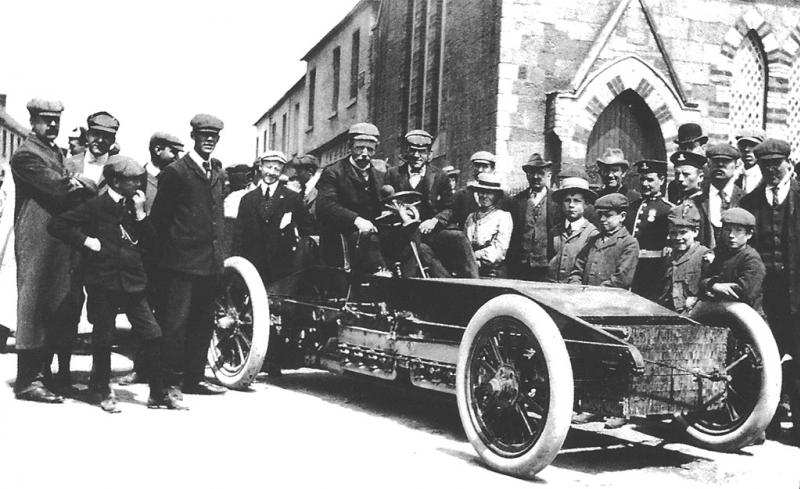
1903 Gordon Bennett Trophy. Athy. Alexander Winton in the Winton Bullet 2

On 2 July 1903, the Gordon Bennett Cup race routed through Athy. It was the first international motor race to be held in Britain or Ireland. The Automobile Club of Great Britain and Ireland wanted the race to be hosted in the British Isles, and Ireland was suggested as the venue because racing was illegal on British public roads. After some lobbying and changes to local laws, County Kildare was chosen, partly because the straightness of the roads would be a safety benefit. As a compliment to Ireland the British team chose to race in Shamrock green which thus became known as British racing green. The route consisted of several loops of a circuit that passed-through Kilcullen, The Curragh, Kildare, Monasterevin, Stradbally and Athy, followed by another loop through Castledermot, Carlow and Athy again. The 328-mile (528 km) race was won by the Belgian racer Camille Jenatzy, driving a Mercedes.

== Places of interest ==
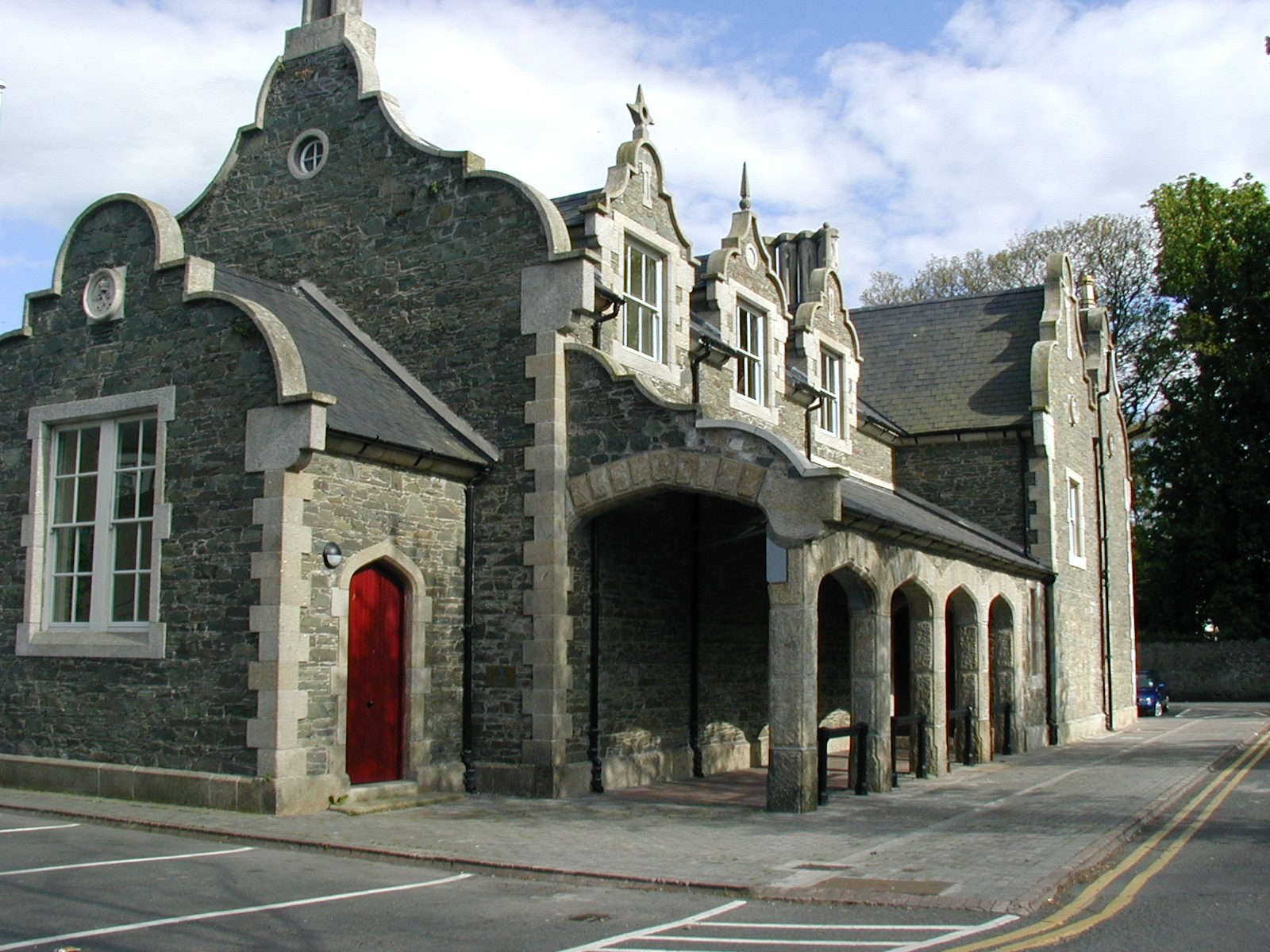
Athy Courthouse

- Athy Courthouse: Athy's courthouse was designed by Frederick Darley and built in the 1850s; it was originally the town's corn exchange.
- O'Brien's Bar: One of the town's pubs, Frank O'Brien's Bar, is considered a tourist attraction and was voted one of the top ten Irish bars in the Sunday Tribune in 1999. Hardware merchants Griffin Hawe now occupy the town's 6 ft. wide and 12 ft. high 18th-century cockpit.
- Kilkea Castle: Kilkea Castle is located just 5 km (3.1 mi) northwest of Castledermot, near the village of Kilkea. It was a medieval stronghold of the FitzGeralds, Earls of Kildare.
- Woodstock Castle: built in the early 13th century to protect the north end of the ford and its western approach. A stone cuboid.

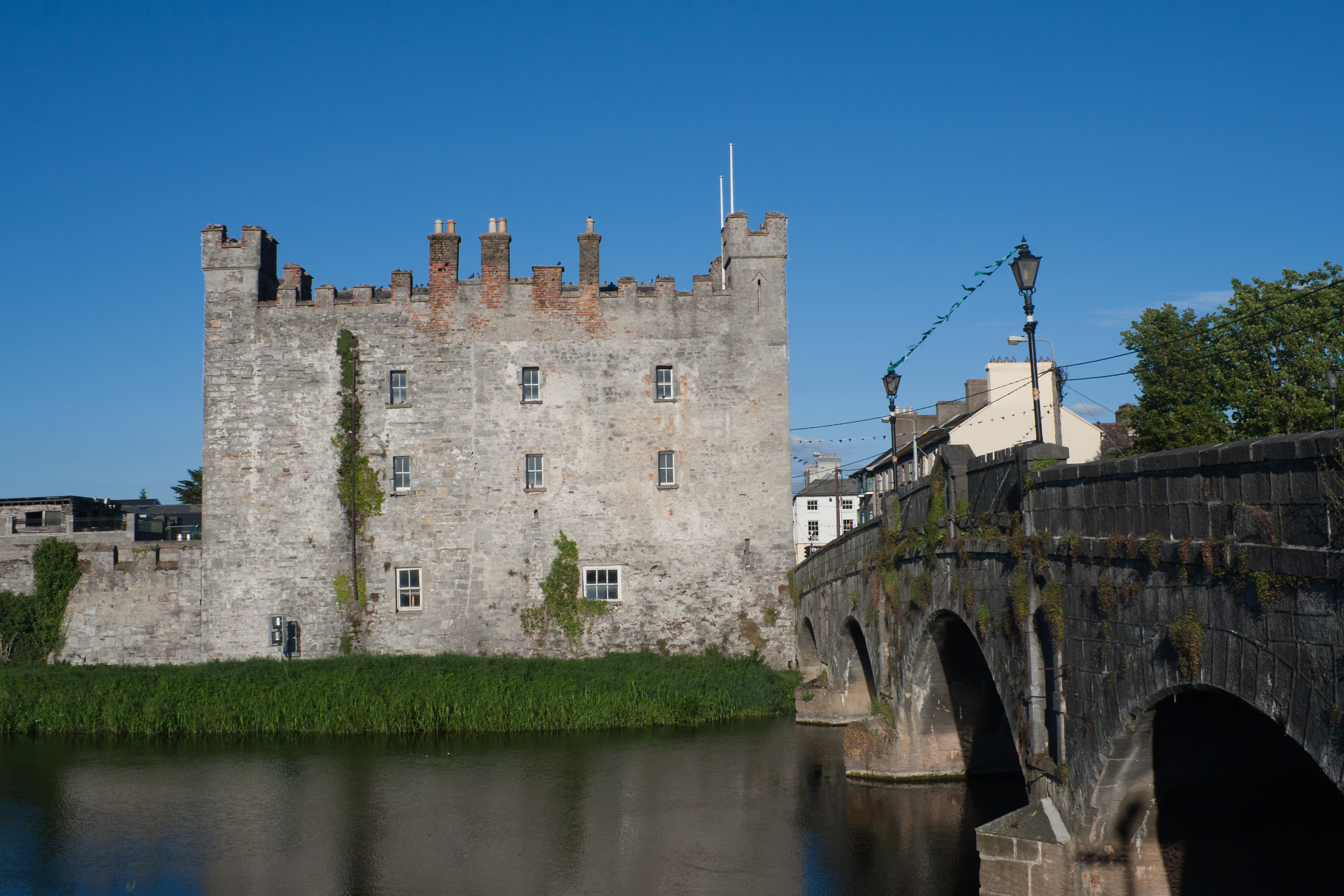
Whites Castle

- White's Castle: White's Castle was built in 1417 by Sir John Talbot, Viceroy of Ireland, to protect the bridge over the Barrow and the inhabitants of the Pale. Built into the wall on either side of the original entrance doorway are two sculptured slabs. On the right of the former doorway is the Earl of Kildare's coat of arms, signifying the earl's ownership of the castle in former days. The slab on the left bears the date 1573, and the name Richard Cossen, Sovereign of Athy.
- The Moat of Ardscull: The Moat of Ardscull is the focal point of local legend about "little people". Assumed to have been built in the late 12th or 13th century, the first clear reference to the moat is in 1654 when the "Book of General Orders" noted a request from the inhabitants of County Kildare for the State to contribute £30 "towards the finishing of a Fort that they have built at the Moate of Ardscull".
- Athy Workhouse: St Vincent's Hospital was formerly the Athy Workhouse. The Athy Poor Law Union was formally declared on 16 January 1841 and covered an area of 252 sq mi (650 km^{2}). The new Athy Union workhouse was erected in 1842–43 on a 6.5 acres (2.6 ha) site half a mile (800 m) north-west of Athy. Designed by the Poor Law Commissioners' architect George Wilkinson, the building was based on one of his standard plans to accommodate 600 inmates.

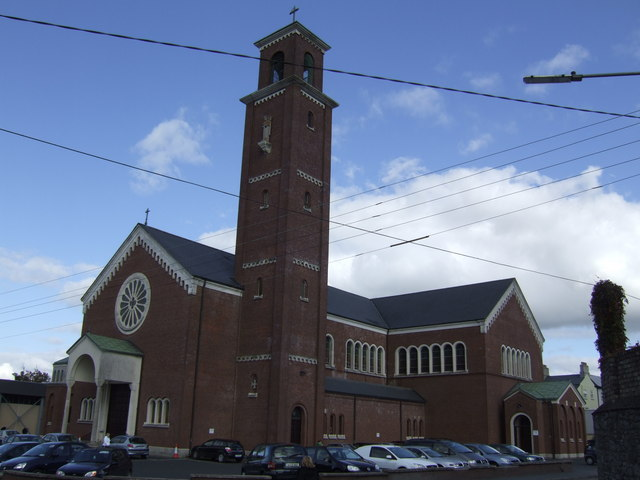
St Michael's Roman Catholic Church

- St Michael's Church: Originally built in the 14th century. Some of the vestry and side walls have disappeared, but there is still some of the original church remaining. A small cross lies within the church grounds and it is said that a cross or font is buried in a grave, within the ruins. There was at one time an arch that stood in front of St. Michael's but during some renovations many years ago, this was taken down.
- Quaker Meeting House: Built in 1780 and standing on Meeting Lane. The first Quakers in Athy may have been Thomas Weston and his wife who in 1657 "received the truth" from Thomas Loe, an English preacher, who was visiting some friends in County Carlow (and who later influenced William Penn). They were soon joined by the Bonnett family, the first Quaker family to settle in Carlow. A Quaker meeting was settled in Athy by 1671, the year in which Athy was included in the list of towns where the Leinster Province Meeting was held. The local Quakers met for worship once a week on Wednesdays, and every month a district meeting was held in Carlow to transact church business. Athy, as part of the Carlow district, also sent delegates to the Province's quarterly meetings.
- The Dominican Church: The Dominicans arrived in Athy in 1253 or 1257. They settled on the eastern bank of the Barrow, first in thatched huts of wood and clay, later in a stone priory and church dedicated to St Peter Martyr, one of the earliest saints of the Order. Today, it is the opposite bank of the river that is dominated by the Dominican Church. In November 2015 the Dominicans finally left Athy due to a lack of friars, and the church and lands have been bought by Kildare County Council. It now operates as the town's local library.
- Shackleton Museum (formerly Athy Heritage Centre): Athy contains the only permanent exhibition on Ernest Shackleton, who was born at Kilkea House. The museum has a collection of artefacts from Athy's past as well as artefacts from Shackleton's expeditions. Among the most impressive is a scale model of the Endurance. Each year the museum arranges and hosts the Shackleton Autumn School, with speakers from around the world discoursing on different aspects of Antarctica and Shackleton's life. In December 2022, the museum closed temporarily for upgrade works.
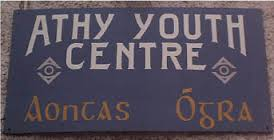
- Aontas Ógra Logo
  Aontas Ógra: The local youth club in Athy which was set up, originally, as an Irish-speaking revival in 1956. It soon developed into a youth club and was the first boy-girl youth club in Ireland. It is still well-established to this day as an independent youth club in Kildare and is located now, beside ARCH on the Ballylinan road.
- 1798 Rebellion Memorial: This landmark is located in Emily Square and is dedicated to Athy's role in the 1798 Rebellion, as well as a memorial to local people who died during the famine years.

== Population ==
Athy was the largest town in Kildare from the first official records in 1813 (population 3,192) until 1891 (population 4,886), and again between 1926 and 1946 and between 1951 and 1961. In 1837 the population was 4,494. The 2022 census established the population of Athy at 11,035.

Historical population
Year	Pop.	±%
1813	3,192	—
1821	3,693	+15.7%
1831	4,494	+21.7%
1841	4,698	+4.5%
1851	3,873	−17.6%
1861	4,124	+6.5%
1871	4,510	+9.4%
1881	4,181	−7.3%
1891	4,886	+16.9%
1901	3,599	−26.3%
1911	3,535	−1.8%
1926	3,460	−2.1%
1936	3,628	+4.9%
1946	3,639	+0.3%
1951	3,752	+3.1%
1956	3,948	+5.2%
1961	3,842	−2.7%
1966	4,069	+5.9%
1971	4,654	+14.4%
1979	4,755	+2.2%
1981	5,565	+17.0%
1986	5,449	−2.1%
1991	5,204	−4.5%
1996	5,306	+2.0%
2002	6,058	+14.2%
2006	7,943	+31.1%
2011	9,587	+20.7%
2016	9,677	+0.9%
2022	11,035	+14.0%

== Transport ==
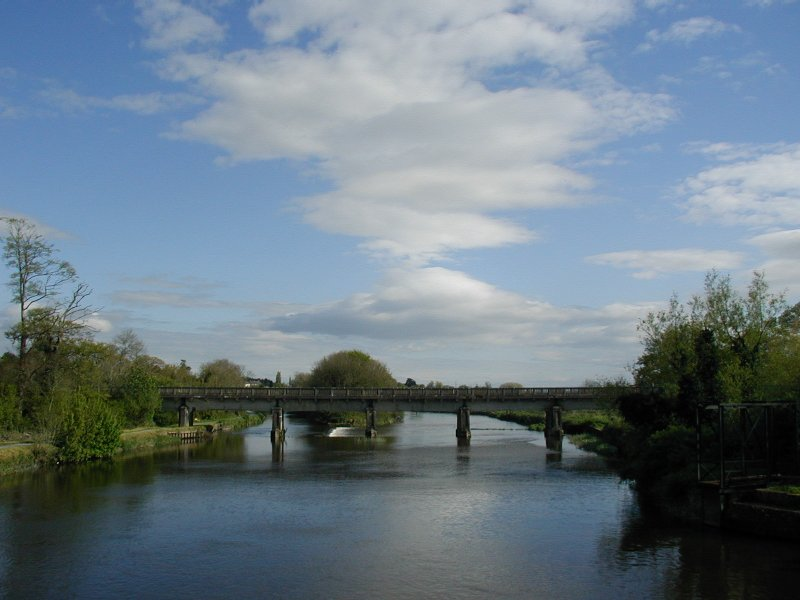
Barrow railway bridge

=== Road ===
The town is located on the N78 national secondary road where it crosses the R417 regional road. In 2010 the N78 was re-aligned so that it no longer heads from Athy towards Kilcullen and Dublin via Ardscull, but now connects with the M9 motorway near Mullamast. The old Athy-Kilcullen section of the road previously known as the N78 is now the R418.

As in December 2021, the N78 Athy Southern Distributor Road (Bypass) has been awarded tender, and is about to go to construction. This should be open to traffic by the end of 2023, and will take up to 8000 vehicles a day out of the town centre.

=== Rail ===
Athy is connected to the Irish rail network via the Dublin–Waterford main line. Athy railway station opened on 4 August 1846 and closed for goods traffic on 6 September 1976. There is a disused siding to the Tegral Slate factory (formerly Asbestos Cement factory). This is all that is left of the former branch to Wolfhill colliery. This side line was built by the United Kingdom government in 1918 due to wartime shortage of coal in Ireland. The concrete bridge over the River Barrow on this branch is one of the earliest concrete railway under-bridges in Ireland.

=== Bus ===
JJ Kavanagh's route 717 and Go-Ahead Ireland's route 130 and 130a serves the town frequently. South Kildare Community Transport also operates two routes from the town serving outlying villages and rural areas.

Line '897' Kilkenny – Castlecomer – Carlow – Athy connects the town with Kilkenny.

== Sport ==
Athy GAA was formed in 1887, and its playing pitches in the early days changed several times until 1905. In 1905 the club rented a field at the Dublin road from the South Kildare Agricultural Society—the present day Geraldine Park. The club had the initiative in those early days to erect a paling around the pitch and was the first club in Leinster to do so. This initiative and the club's effort were rewarded when the All-Ireland finals were played in Athy in 1906.

Athy Rugby Club was founded in 1880 and is a seven-time winner of the Leinster Towns Cup, most recently winning it in 2025 and 2026.

Athy Golf Club was formed in 1906 as a nine-hole course and was extended to 18 holes in 1993. The course had a par of 71 and it extended to 6,400 yards from the medal tees. It is situated at Geraldine, a mile from town on the Kildare Road.

Among the longer-standing sports clubs in the area is Athy Cricket Club, which was founded in 1872 and was one of the first cricket clubs in Kildare.

Tri-Athy is a triathlon event held in Athy on the June Bank Holiday weekend.

Other sports clubs serving the area include Athy Tennis Club, and Athy Town AFC. the club was formed in 1948 and is the main association football club in the town, it has now over 450 members with teams ranging from u4s to two senior adult teams, the junior teams play in the Kildare and District underage league with the senior teams playing in the leinster senior league and the carlow District football league respectively. The club celebrated its 75th birthday in 2023 making it one of the oldest soccer teams in leinster. The club play their games in Aldridge park which is situated in the showgrounds with Athy GAA and Athy Rugby club.

== Twinning ==
In 2004, the town was twinned with the French town of Grandvilliers in the Oise-Picardy département. The French twinning committee is named "La Balad'Irlandaise", and official visits take place every two years, while musical and student exchanges take place more regularly.

== Notable people ==
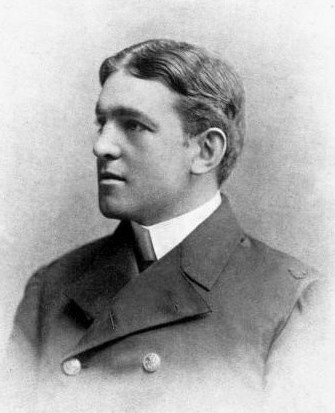
Sir Ernest Shackleton

- Joseph Bermingham, politician
- Walter Borrowes, MP
- Thomas Burgh, MP
- Walter Hussey Burgh, MP
- Joey Carbery, international rugby player
- Seamus Clandillon, Irish musician, civil servant, and first director of radio broadcasting at 2RN
- Thomas Condon, senator
- Sister Consilio, addiction campaigner
- Dál Cormaic, Gaelic dynasty located in South Kildare
- Francis Cosby, English soldier and settler in Ireland; implicated in the Massacre of Mullaghmast
- Philip Crosthwaite, businessman and politician
- Paul Cullen, Archbishop of Dublin and the first Irish cardinal
- Des Dalton, politician
- The Danzigers, American film producers who lived in Bert House
- Cecil Day-Lewis, poet laureate
- William de Burgh, MP, anti-slavery campaigner and colleague of William Wilberforce
- Robert Digby, courtier
- Robert Dillon
- Eric Donovan, Irish boxer and European championships bronze medal winner
- Patrick Dooley, politician
- Johnny Doran, musician
- Charles John Engledow
- Maurice Eustace (d. 1665), previously MP for Athy and County Kildare
- Helen Evans, ground-breaking academic, activist and member of the Edinburgh seven
- Rory Feely, footballer
- Lesley Fennell, Irish postwar and contemporary portrait artist
- Frederick Falkiner, MP
- Lord Edward FitzGerald, politician and revolutionary
- Lord Henry FitzGerald
- James FitzGerald, 1st Duke of Leinster
- William FitzGerald, 2nd Duke of Leinster
- James H. Flack
- Michael Foley, Kildare footballer
- Lydia Foy, Irish trans activist
- William Russell Grace, businessman and politician
- Thomas Colley Grattan
- John Nassau Greene, politician
- William Hare, 1st Earl of Listowel
- John Vincent Holland, Victoria Cross recipient
- Mark Hughes, footballer
- John Hurt, British actor who settled in Ballintubbert House
- John S. Jackson, Irish geologist and environmentalist, believed to be the first environmental consultant in Ireland
- Arthur Johnston, priest
- Thomas Kelly, hymn-writer
- Mary Leadbeater, author and diarist
- Thomas Lee, soldier and assassin
- Jeremy Loughman, rugby player
- Jack Lukeman, musician and record producer
- George Lyttleton-Rogers, tennis player and coach
- John MacKenna, playwright and novelist
- John Maher, car specialist and former drummer of The Buzzcocks
- Mani (Gary Mounfield), Stone Roses and Primal Scream bassist/musician
- Johnny Marr, musician, member of The Smiths
- Richard Meredith, bishop
- Meredyth family
- Bobby Miller, Gaelic footballer
- Matthew Minch, politician
- John Minihan, photographer
- Christopher Neil, musician, actor and producer
- Alexander Nevill, priest
- Liam O'Flynn, uilleann piper
- Padraig O'Neill, footballer
- Picture This, band
- Eliane Plewman, agent of Special Operations Executive (SOE) executed in Dachau concentration camp in 1945
- Frank Power, basketball coach
- Una Power, medium and broadcaster
- Paddy Prendergast, racehorse trainer
- James Quinn, bishop
- William Henry Rattigan
- Brendan Ryan, Cork politician
- Sir Ernest Shackleton, explorer
- Christopher St Lawrence, 10th Baron Howth
- Joe Stynes, Irish republican and sportsman
- Robert Stearne Tighe, Irish writer and Fellow of the Royal Society
- Jack Wall, politician
- Wendy F. Walsh, artist
- Arthur Wellesley, 1st Duke of Wellington It is said that on the 1851 census Wellington entered under "Birthplace" "In Ireland, believe Athy."
- Zoltan Zinn-Collis, Slovak survivor of the Holocaust, author of Final Witness; one of only five living survivors of the Holocaust in Ireland; died in his Athy home in Ireland on 10 December 2012

== See also ==
- List of abbeys and priories in Ireland (County Kildare)
- List of towns and villages in Ireland
- List of market houses in Ireland
- Duke of Leinster
