= Tully Stream =

Stream in County Kildare, Ireland

- Native name: An Tulach (Irish)

Location
- Country: Ireland

Physical characteristics
- Source
  - location: Tully West, County Kildare
  - elevation: 84 m (276 ft)
- Mouth
  - location: Celtic Sea at Waterford Harbour via Finnery River and River Barrow
  - coordinates: 53°04′18″N 6°59′55″W
- Length: 13 km (8.1 mi)
- Basin size: 49.3 km^{2} (19.0 sq mi)
- Discharge
  - average: 0.063 m^{3}/s (2.2 cu ft/s)

Tully Stream (Irish: An Tulach) is a stream in County Kildare, Ireland. It rises near Kildare town and ultimately drains into the Celtic Sea via other rivers.

== Name ==
Tully Stream takes its name from the Tully civil parish in which it rises, which in turn gets its name from tulaigh, the Irish for "hillock."

== Course ==
Tully Stream rises south of the Irish National Stud near Kildare town. It flows south parallel to the R415 road, passing through Brallistown, an area where the stream is associated with Saint Brigit. It passes under the Soomeragh Bridge and Walterstown Bridge before turning westward and flowing through Nurney, County Kildare, flowing under the R415 at Nurney Bridge. The Tully Stream flows on through Harristown, where there is an EPA monitoring station. It then turns southwest, meeting a tributary stream at Lenagorra, flowing through Cherrymills and draining into the Finnery River at Boherbaun Lower. (The Finnery flows into the River Barrow which flows into the Celtic Sea via Waterford city.)

== History ==
Tully Stream has an ancient association with Brigit of Kildare. The well at Tully is dedicated to her. Brallistown, also called "The Greallachs" (Irish greallach, meaning puddle/mire) is said to have been the site where Brigit kept her cow, prayed, and made butter by Tully Stream. St. Brigid's Shoes are two stones through which the stream flows.

== Wildlife ==
Brown trout (Salmo trutta), three-spined stickleback (Gasterosteus aculeatus), common dace (Leuciscus leuciscus) and nine-spined stickleback (Pungitius pungitius) are all found in Tully Stream.

== Pollution ==
Phosphate levels are high in Tully Stream, causing eutrophication. In 2001-03, it was listed as being "seriously polluted" due to municipal discharges. The EPA reported "seriously polluted" stretches in 2006, 2007 and 2008. The Irish National Stud was fined €500 in 2008 for making illegal discharges into the Tully Stream.

== See also ==
- Rivers of Ireland
