= Arthur Johnston (priest) =

Arthur Joseph Johnston (1866–1941) was an Irish Anglican

Johnston was educated at Trinity College, Dublin and ordained in 1891. His first post was as a curate at Drumcannon. He held incumbencies in Forkhill, Drumbanagher, Kilcullen and Athy; and was Archdeacon of Glendalough from 1914 until 1941.
