= James H. Flack =

James H. Flack is a contemporary Irish watercolour painter. He was born in County Armagh, Northern Ireland in 1941 and settled in Athy, County Kildare in the early 1970s. He is a member of the Water Colour Society of Ireland, the Ulster Watercolour Society, the Dublin Art Club and the Dublin Sketching Club. He holds the degrees of BA, BD, M.Th., and H.Dip.Ed. from Trinity College Dublin and Edinburgh University.

== Background ==
Flack's interest in painting developed at an early age when his mother, headmistress of the local primary school, encouraged her pupils to use art work throughout the school curriculum. At the age of ten his paintings were chosen for display in a children's exhibition that was a feature of the 1951 Festival of Britain. Flack initially trained for a career in the Presbyterian ministry but instead chose to pursue painting. His works have been selected and hung for many years in the Oireachtas and in the Royal Hibernian Academy. He has regular one-man exhibitions in Dublin, Galway, Cork and Belfast as well as one-man exhibitions in Wexford during the Wexford Festival Opera and in Kilkenny during Arts Week. He has also had an exhibition of his work in the Canadian cities of London, Ontario, Montreal and Winnipeg as well as in San Antonio, Texas in the United States. In 2000, the Athy Urban District Council presented Flack with an award for "outstanding achievement in the arts".

Flack has also received the O’Sullivan Graphic Award at the Watercolour Society of Ireland's Annual Exhibition 1999 for a work of particular distinction, and the Amanace Consultants awards at the Waterecolour Society of Irelands Annual Exhibition 2002. He is married to Marlynne Flack and has one son, Stephen Hall Flack.

== Works ==
Flack's paintings have been purchased by public institutions including Irish banks, business companies, public libraries and by private collectors at home and abroad. While his subject interests are wide-ranging, his favourite themes are landscapes and seascapes with the emphasis on details of nature. He also gives watercolour painting courses to summer schools, art groups and private individuals each year throughout Ireland and Wales.
