= Zoltan Zinn-Collis =

Slovak Holocaust survivor

Zoltan Zinn-Collis (1940, Vysoké Tatry, Slovakia – 10 December 2012, Athy, Ireland) was a Slovak survivor of the Holocaust. He was one of only five living Holocaust survivors in Ireland. He died in his Athy home in Ireland on 10 December 2012. He thought himself to be born on 1 August 1940, but was not certain.

== Books ==
- Zinn-Collis, Zoltan; Alicia McAuley (2006). Final Witness: My Journey from the Holocaust to Ireland. Maverick House. ISBN 978-1905379187.
