= Wendy F. Walsh =

Artist

Wendy Felicité Walsh

Personal details
- Born: 1915 Bowness-on-Windermere, Cumbria, England
- Died: 2014 (aged 98–99) Abergavenny, Wales

Wendy Felicité Walsh (9 April 1915 – 3 March 2014) was an artist born in Cumbria who lived and worked in Ireland and was a prolific botanical illustrator.

== Early and personal life ==
She was born Wendy Felicité Storey in Bowness-on-Windermere, Cumbria in 1915. She was educated at home by a governess until she was 14; she painted from the age of six. She was not permitted to attend art school, but studied privately under the animal painters Cecil Aldin and Arminell Morshead.

During the second world war she worked as a VAD (Voluntary Aid Detachment) field nurse. During that time she met her future husband, and in 1941 she married John Mainwaring Walsh, then a Major, ultimately a lieutenant colonel in the British Army. His mother was from Edgeworthstown in County Longford. After following her husband around the world on various military postings, including in Japan (where she studied Chinese ink techniques) and Washington, D.C., she moved in 1958, with her husband and three children (daughters Lesley and Anna and son Michael), to Lusk, Ireland, as John Walsh had retired from the British Army to become Agent of Trinity College Dublin. They lived there for 41 years.

In 1999 she and her husband retired to a house in Kildare next to Lesley Fennell, at Burtown House near Athy. There is now a permanent exhibition of some of her work at that house.

After the death of her husband in 2007, she divided her time between her three children and died at Abergavenny, Wales in 2014, a few weeks short of her 99th birthday.

== Botanical illustration ==
In the 1930s Walsh painted mostly dog portraits for customers, and horses for herself. She remained an amateur painter until the mid-1970s, when, following a visit to the Gilbert Islands, she was commissioned to design floral stamps, starting her career as a professional artist at the age of 60. The Gilbert Islands stamps led to a series of commissions for Irish stamps, on the theme of Irish flora and fauna, and then to a series of books.

In 1980 she was the recipient of her first Royal Horticultural Society medal. She continued to win awards through the 80s and 90s. She was awarded a doctorate from Trinity College, Dublin in 1997.

In 1983, her best known book, The Irish Florilegium – Wild and Garden Plants of Ireland, was published. It was awarded a bronze medal for the 'Most beautiful Book in the World' at the Leipzig Book Fair.

She received many awards including the Alpine Society Gold Award in 1991 and 1993.

Walsh produced the art for 15 books on Ireland's flora and fauna, working with the Irish taxonomist Charles Nelson who wrote the accompanying text for most of her books. Her work has been exhibited in London, Pittsburgh, Melbourne, South Africa and Ireland. She was nominated as the first member of the Irish Society of Botanical Artists two days before her death.

== Awards ==
- 1980 – Royal Horticultural Society – Gold Medal
- 1983 – Royal Horticultural Society – Grenfell Silver Gilt Medal
- 1985 – Royal Horticultural Society – Grenfell Silver Gilt Medal
- 1988 – Royal Horticultural Society – Gold Medal
- 1991 – Alpine Garden Society – Gold Award
- 1993 – Alpine Garden Society – Gold Award
- 1994 – Royal Horticultural Society – Gold Medal
- 1996 – Royal Horticultural Society of Ireland – Medal of Honour
- 1997 – Royal Horticultural Society – Grenfell Silver Gilt Medal
- 1997 – University of Dublin – Doctor in Litteris
- 1998 – Royal Dublin Society – Honorary Life Member
- 2001 – Royal Horticultural Society – Grenfell Silver Gilt Medal
- 2002 – Royal Horticultural Society – Grenfell Silver Gilt Medal
- Hon. Member of Irish Garden Plant Society
- Friends of the Library, Trinity College, University of Dublin

== Selected publications ==
- An Irish Florilegium – Wild and Garden Flowers of Ireland Volume 1 (1983)
- An Irish Florilegium – Wild and Garden Flowers of Ireland Volume 2 (1987)
- An Irish Flower Garden Replanted (1984)
- A Prospect of Irish Flowers (1990)
- The Burren: a Companion to the Wildflowers of Ireland’s Limestone Wilderness (1991)
- Trees of Ireland: Native and Naturalized (1993)
- Flowers of Mayo (1995)
