= Rheban Castle =

Ruined castle in County Kildare, Ireland

- Caisleán Réabáin (Irish)
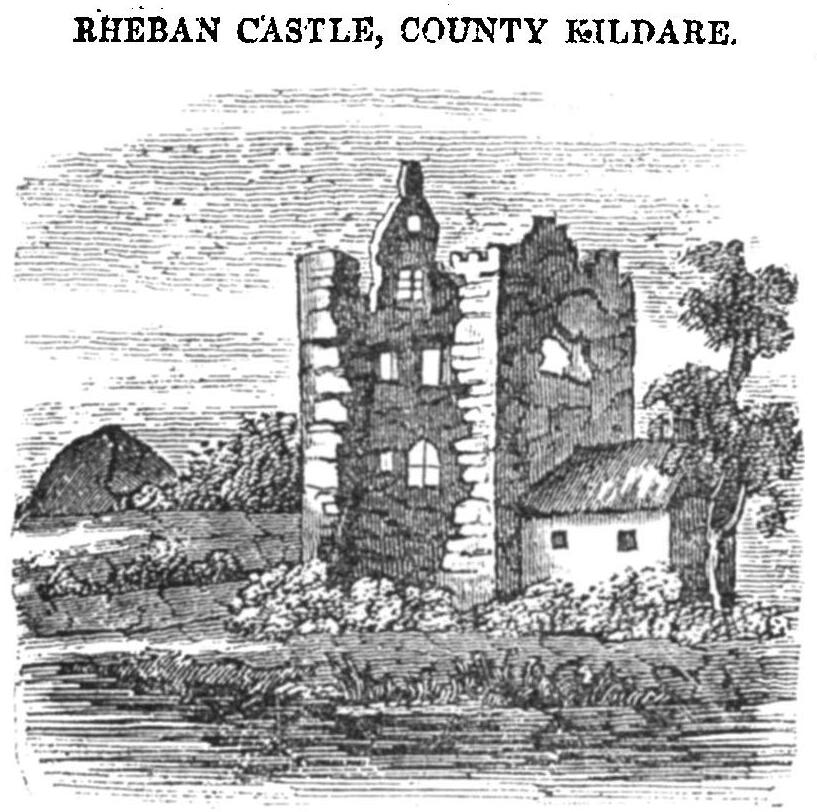
- Rheban Castle, Dublin Penny Journal 1835

- Location within Ireland
- 53.030272°N 7.035214°W
- Location: Castlereban North, Athy, County Kildare, Ireland

History
- Built: c. 1200

Rheban Castle /ˈrɛbən/ is a castle located in County Kildare, Ireland.

== Location ==
Rheban Castle is located 5.4 kilometres (3.4 mi) northwest of Athy, on the west bank of the River Barrow. Hendy Wildlife Reserve lies to the north, and Kilberry to the east, across the Barrow.

== History ==
Ptolemy's Geography (2nd century AD) names Rhaiba ('Ραιβα) as one of the settlements of the Leinster region. This was traditionally taken to refer to Rheban, although modern writers see a site nearer Ireland's centre as more likely: the Hill of Uisneach, Rathcroghan or Carnfree.

The remains of a much older ringfort, known as the Moat of Rheban, lie about 1 km to the south of the castle. The name of the castle is thought to derive from ríogh ("king") and bábhún ("bawn", enclosure).

After the Norman invasion of Ireland in the late 12th century, a stone castle was built by Richard de St. Michael, baron of Reban, during the reign of John as Lord of Ireland. He also founded Athy Priory.

In 1325 the castle and surrounding area were taken by the Ó Mórdha (Moores) of modern County Laois. In 1424 Rheban passed to Thomas FitzGerald (later 7th Earl of Kildare) when he married Dorothea, daughter of Anthony O'More.

In the 15th century it was raided by Seán Ó Broin (of the Glenmalure O'Byrnes), who won treasure and fame celebrated in a poem by Ferganin McKeogh.

The castle changed hands many times during the Irish Confederate Wars (1641–50), falling to James Butler, Marquess of Ormond in 1642, Owen Roe O'Neill in 1647 and Murrough O'Brien, 1st Earl of Inchiquin in 1648 and has been in ruins since then.

It gives its name to the baronies of Narragh and Reban East and Narragh and Reban West, as well as the local Gaelic games club, Rheban GAA.

== Description ==
A stone castle of three storeys, without roof. Near the castle is a conical mound, believed to have been a tumulus raised over some Irish king or chieftain.

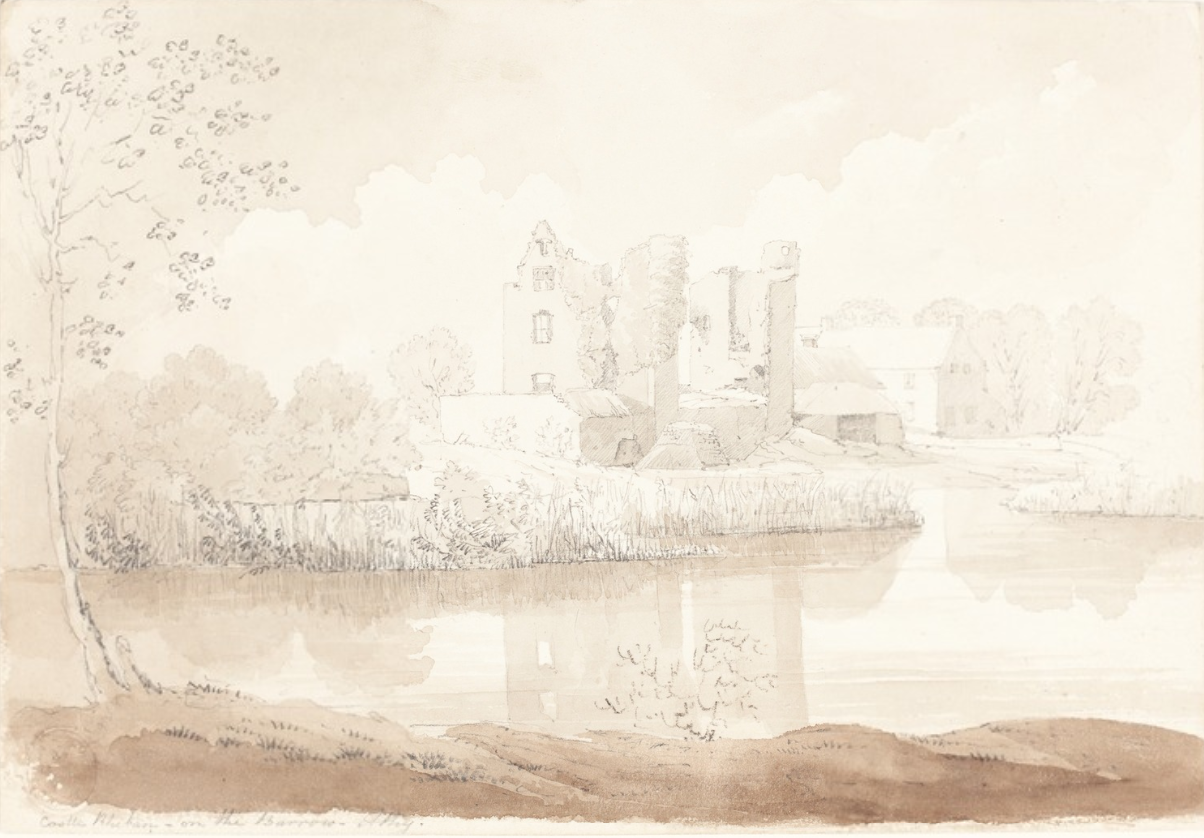
19th century graphite and black chalk sketch, attributed to James Bulwer.

== See also ==
- List of castles in Ireland
