= Narragh and Reban East =

Narragh and Reban East An Fhorrach agus an Réabán Thoir (Irish)
- Barony
- Interactive map of Narragh and Reban East
- Sovereign state: Ireland
- County: Kildare

Area
  - Total: 86.5 km^{2} (33.4 sq mi)

Narragh and Reban East (/ˈnærə, ˈrɛbən/, Irish: An Fhorrach agus an Réabán Thoir; sometimes spelled Rheban) is a barony in County Kildare, Ireland.

== Etymology ==
The barony takes its name from the village of Narragh (from Irish an fhorrach, "the meeting-place") and Rheban Castle (ríogh-bábhún, "king's bawn").

== Location ==
The barony of Narragh and Reban East is located in southeast County Kildare.

== History ==
Narragh and Reban East were part of the ancient lands of the Ua Tuathail (O'Tooles) before the 13th century, retaken in the 14th. An Uí Garrchon branch is also noted here. There were originally two separate baronies, united by 1572, and then divided into west and east baronies before 1807.

== List of settlements ==
Below is a list of settlements in Narragh and Reban East:

- Ballitore
- Narraghmore
- Timolin
