= Athy Courthouse =

Judicial building in Athy, County Kildare, Ireland

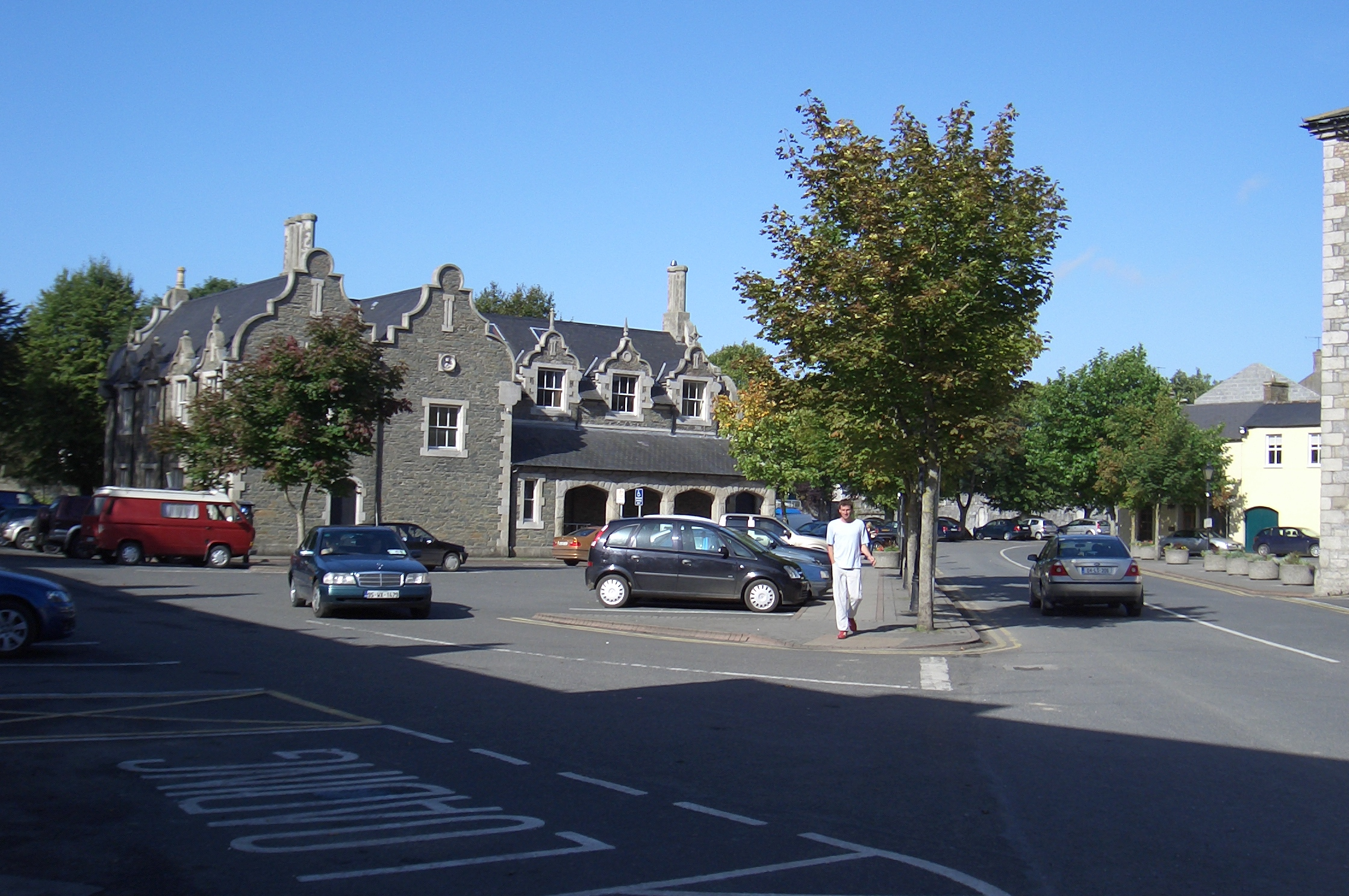
- Athy Courthouse

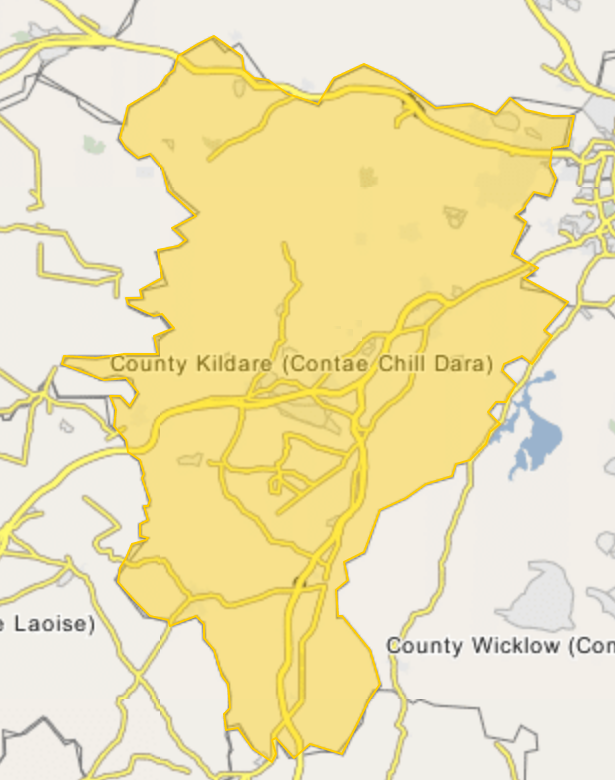
- Location within County Kildare
- 52.9914°N 6.9838°W
- Location: Emily Square, Athy

History
- Built: 1857

Site notes
- Architect: Frederick Darley
- Architectural style: Tudor Revival style

Athy Courthouse is a judicial building in Emily Square, Athy, County Kildare, Ireland. The structure, which was previously used as a corn exchange, is listed on the National Inventory of Architectural Heritage.

== History ==
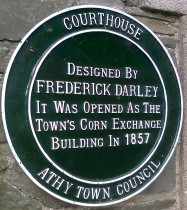
Plaque on the courthouse

The building was commissioned in the mid-19th century as a corn exchange by Augustus FitzGerald, 3rd Duke of Leinster, whose seat was at Carton House. It was designed by Frederick Darley in the Tudor Revival style, built in rubble masonry and was officially opened on 6 October 1857.

The design involved a central courthouse block with a single storey loggia of four bays on either side. There was originally a small porch at the north end, although this was later converted into a toilet, and an office block of four bays at the south end. Above the loggia, there were three sash windows with architraves surmounted by moulded gables with finials. Internally, the principal room was the main hall which was 70 feet (21 m) long and 30 feet (9.1 m) wide. Large quantities of corn were purchased there for the local mills and for the Dublin market.

The main hall was found to be badly ventilated and poorly lit, and by the 1860s, it was in limited use. Its use as a corn exchange declined further in the wake of the Great Depression of British Agriculture in the late 19th century. It was therefore converted for use as the local courthouse at around that time.

The assizes were held in Athy in the early 20th century, but during the Irish War of Independence, the building was completed destroyed by fire in an attack by Irish Republican Army volunteers on 20 July 1920. It was rebuilt to a design by Foley and O'Sullivan in around 1928. It then hosted regular meetings of the district court and quarterly meetings of the, more senior, circuit court. It also hosted for the County Kildare Gaelic Athletic Association convention in February 1932.

However, by the mid-1990s the fabric of the building was in a poor condition. A major programme of refurbishment works was carried out by local contractors, D. and J. Carbery, at a cost of circa £362,000 to a design my Michael Lysaght in the late 20th century: it was officially re-opened by the Minister for Justice, Equality and Law Reform, John O'Donoghue, on 21 June 2001.
