= Una Power =

The Psychic Zone
- Running time: 2 hours
- Country of origin: Ireland
- Language: English
- Home station: Dublin's 98
- Hosted by: Una Power
- Starring: Shirley Johnson
- Directed by: Becky Johnson & Sarah O'Kelly
- Recording studio: Grand Canal Quay, Dublin
- Original release: 1992 – 2008
- Audio format: Talk radio
- Opening theme: "Read My Mind" by The Killers
- Website: Showpage

Una Power (1943 – 1 June 2023) was an English-born Irish card reader and author, notable for her appearance on The Psychic Zone on Dublin's 98 and occasional guest slots on TV3's Ireland AM series. She had previously worked with the BBC, as well as KFM, a local station in County Kildare. She resided in Levitstown near Athy.

She met clients at her office in central Dublin in addition to her premium telephone service and media appearances. The Psychic Zone was a phone-in show, broadcast from 22:00 to midnight on Fridays and Sundays, and in late 2008 it was changed to just the Sunday show. In January 2009, Dublin's 98 released its new schedule without Power's show.

She died on 1 June 2023 after being diagnosed with Lewy body dementia.
