= Athy Town Hall =

Municipal building in Athy, County Kildare, Ireland

- Halla an Bhaile Átha Í
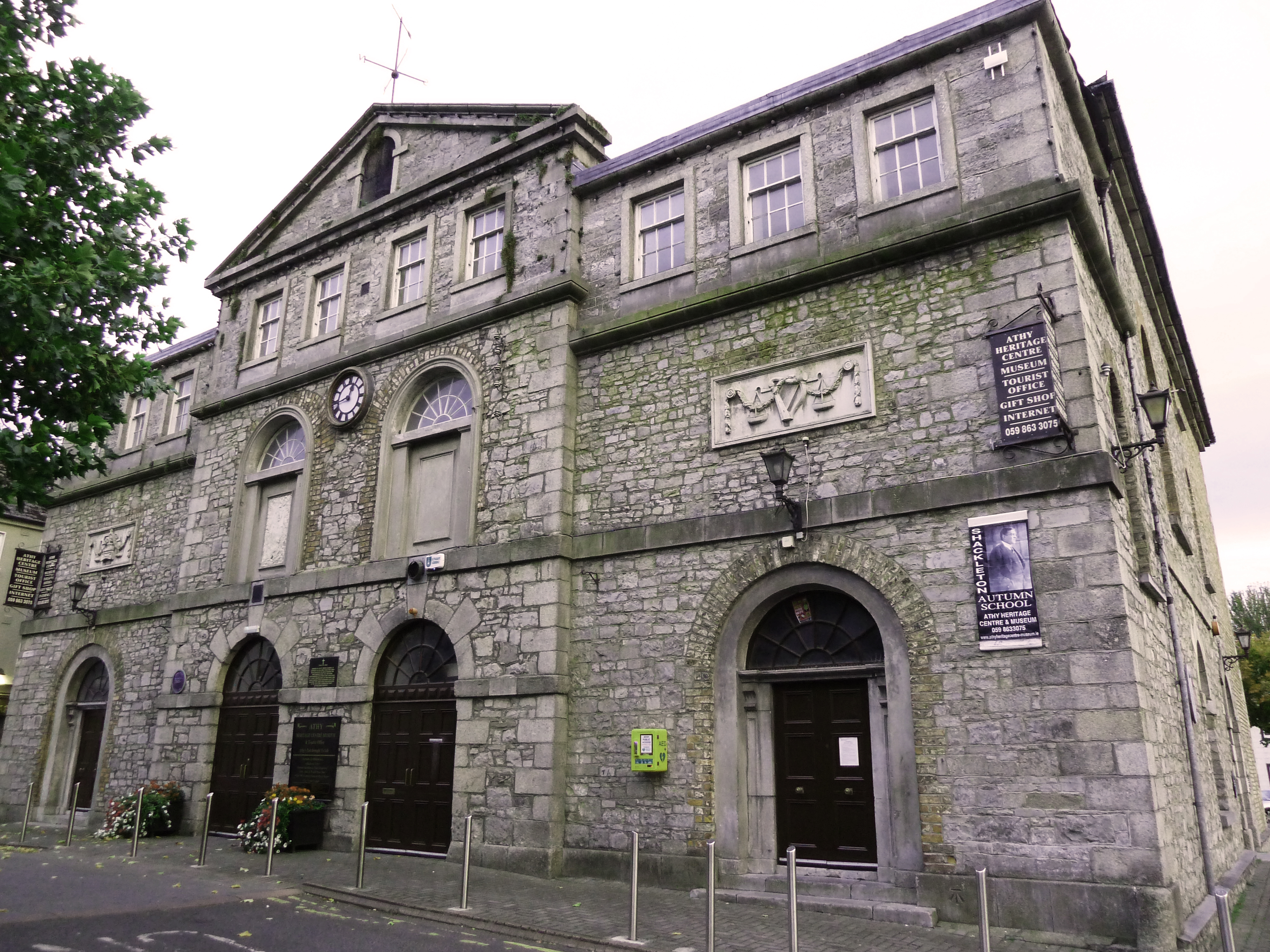
- Athy Town Hall

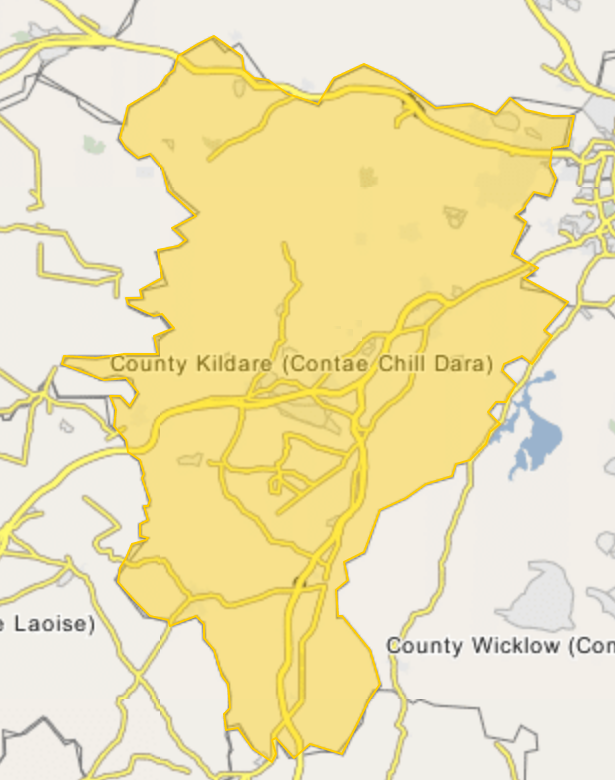
- Location within County Kildare

General information
- Architectural style: Neoclassical style
- Location: Emily Square, Athy, Ireland
- Coordinates: 52.9917°N 6.9832°W
- Completed: c.1745

Design and construction
- Architect: Richard Cassels

Athy Town Hall (Irish: Halla an Bhaile Átha Í) is a municipal building in Emily Street, Athy, County Kildare, Ireland. The building accommodated the offices of Athy Urban District Council until 1985, but is now used as a heritage centre.

== History ==
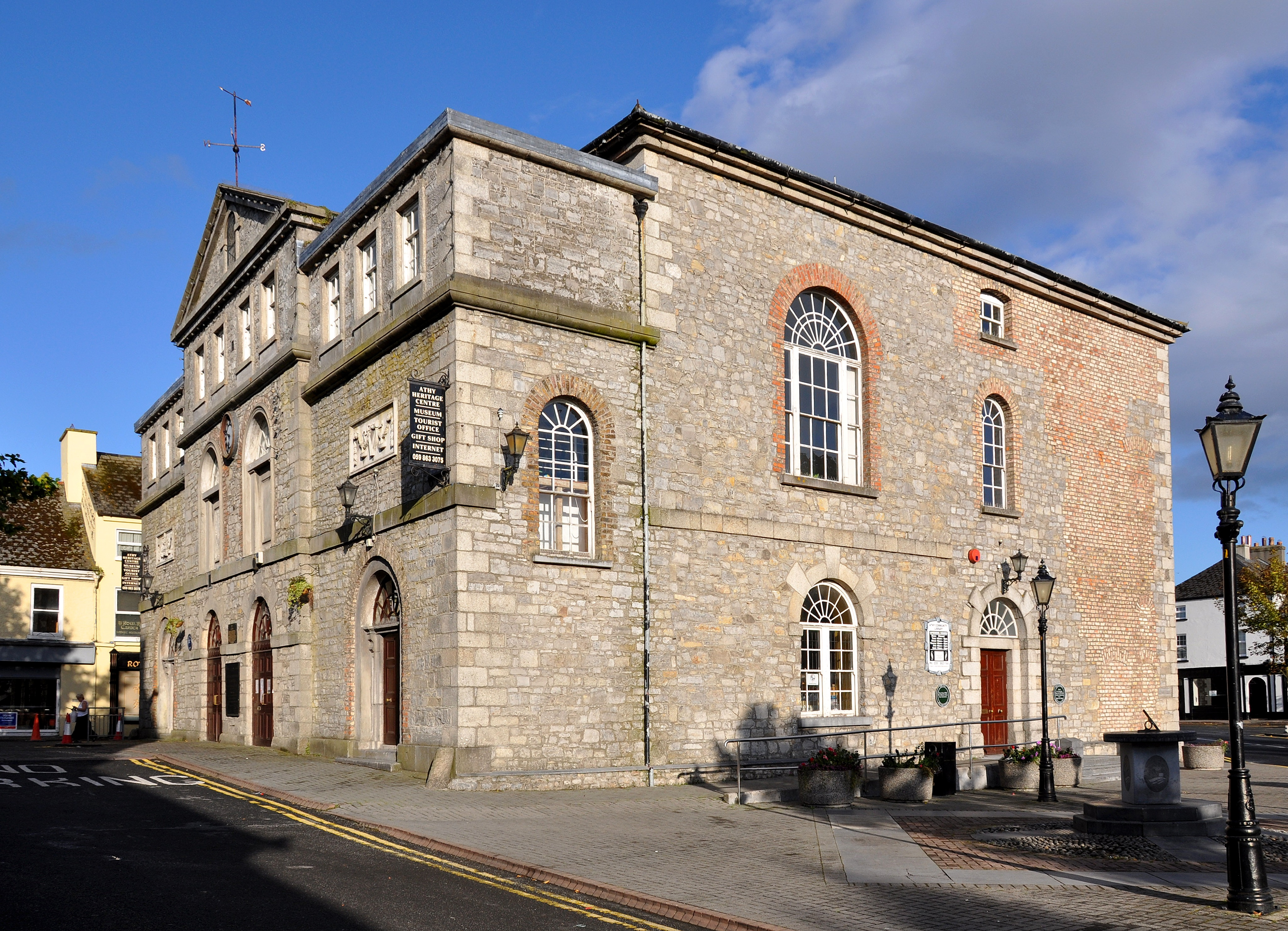
A side view of the market house.

The building was commissioned as a market house by James FitzGerald, 20th Earl of Kildare in the early 1740s. It was designed in the neoclassical style, probably by Richard Cassels, built in rubble masonry, and was completed around 1745. The original design involved a T-shaped building facing onto the town square. It was arcaded on the ground floor, so that markets could be held, with an assembly room on the first floor. The building was extended to the front, to infill the wings, in around 1800, and a bell dating from the 17th century, recovered from the old St Michael's Church in the town square when it was demolished in 1842, was installed in the town hall around that time.

The building was altered again to accommodate the offices of the newly-formed town commissioners in the mid-19th century, and it became the offices and meeting place of Athy Urban District Council when it was formed in 1900. It was extended upwards with an additional storey in 1913. The design then involved a symmetrical main frontage of ten bays facing onto the town square. The central section of four bays, which was slightly projected forward, featured two doorways with fanlights, voussoirs and keystones on the ground floor, two blind windows with fanlights on the first floor and four sash windows on the second floor. The central section was surmounted by a modillioned pediment with a round headed opening in the tympanum and a weather vane above. The wings contained doorways with architraves and voussoirs on the ground floor, panels carved with depictions of Justice on the first floor and sash windows on the second floor.

The building became the national headquarters of the rural youth organisation, Macra na Feirme, in September 1947. The central part of the ground floor of the building was adapted for use by the fire service, with the fire engine doors established at the rear of the structure, in 1969. Kildare County Council acquired the building from the FitzGerald family for £9,000 in 1975. After the urban district council relocated to new offices at Stanhope Street in Rathstewart in 1985, much of the building became vacant and began to deteriorate. A major programme of refurbishment works was completed in May 1990, and the Athy Heritage Centre was established in the building in 1997. The heritage centre became the main occupant of the building after the fire service relocated to Woodstock Street in 2000.

A statue of the polar explorer, Ernest Shackleton, who was born nearby in Kilkea, was sculpted by Mark Richards at a cost of €60,000 and was unveiled outside the town hall by Shackleton's grand-daughter, Alexandra Shackleton, on 30 August 2016. The ship's cabin from the schooner-rigged steamship, Quest, in which Shackleton died, was donated to the heritage centre and sent for conservation in 2015. Proposals to establish a museum dedicated to Ernest Shackleton in the building were submitted to Kildare County Council in January 2019.
