= Robert Stearne Tighe =

Irish writer (1760–1835)

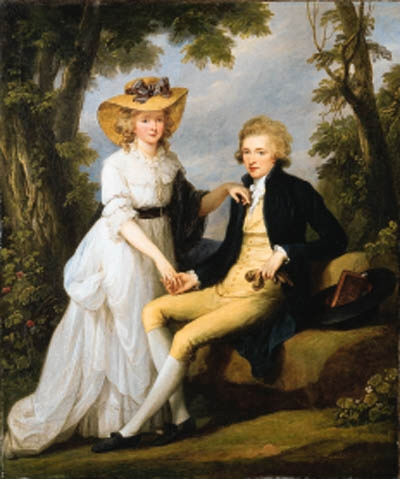
Robert Stearne Tighe with his wife Catherine, by Angelica Kaufmann

Robert Stearne Tighe (1760–1835) was an Irish writer and Fellow of the Royal Society.

== Life ==
He was the son of Richard Stearne Tighe (died December 1761), Member of the Irish House of Commons for Athy, and his wife Arabella, daughter of Sir John Osborne, 7th Baronet and Edith Proby, born 3 March 1760. He entered St John's College, Cambridge in 1776, and in the same year inherited the estate of his grandfather Robert Tighe.

Tighe was elected to the Royal Society in 1793. He died on 21 May 1835.

== Works ==
- Melantius: A Letter Addressed to Mr. Orde Upon the Education of the People (1787)
- Observations and reflections on the state of Ireland (1804), with a reply Considerations on the late and present state of Ireland.

== Family ==
Tighe married:

1. In 1786, Catherine Morgan (died 1819), daughter of Hugh Morgan of Cottelstown, County Sligo; they had sons Robert Morgan, William Stearne, and Hugh Usher, and a daughter Catherine who married William Henry Worth Newenham of Coolmore, son of William Worth Newenham.
2. Anna Dilkes (died 1823), sister of Major-General William Thomas Dilkes.
