= Alexander Nevill (priest) =

Alexander Colles Nevill (1912–2003) was the Archdeacon of Ossory and Leighlin from 1951 until 1962.

Nevill was educated at Trinity College Dublin and ordained in 1911. He began his career with a curacy at Athy. He was the Incumbent at Nurney, County Carlow from 1922; a prebendary at St Canice's Cathedral, Kilkenny from 1940 to 1951; and Precentor of St Laserian's Cathedral, Old Leighlin from 1947 to 1951.
