= Athy Priory =

Friary in Athy, Ireland

- Mainistir Átha Í
- Location within Ireland
- Interactive map of Athy Priory

Monastery information
- Other names: Bailr-atha-ai; Athai; Athies
- Order: Dominican Order
- Established: 1253
- Disestablished: mid-19th century
- Diocese: Dublin

People
- Founders: Boysel and Hogan family

Architecture
- Status: ruined
- Style: Norman

Site
- Location: St Michael's, Athy, County Kildare
- Coordinates: 52.990694°N 6.983284°W
- Public access: yes

Athy Priory is a former friary of the Dominican Order located in Athy, Ireland.

== Location ==
Athy Priory is located in the south of the town, on the east bank of the River Barrow.

== History ==
Athy Priory was founded by the Boiseles (Boysel) and Hogans in 1253, although some sources give the date as 1257. John of Slane gave them six acres, and Edward II consented to this grant. In 1288, 1295 and 1305, chapters of the order were held at Athy.

The priory was dissolved 30 April 1539 and rented to Martin Pelles, constable of Athy, on 26 April 1540. At that time, the priory owned two fishing-weirs, a water mill, while the buildings were a church and belfry, chapter-house, dormitory, hall, three chambers and a kitchen, a cemetery, garden and orchard. In 1588 the priory was granted to Henry FitzGerald, 12th Earl of Kildare.

Athy was refounded c.1622 by Fr Ross Mageoghegan. Friars also returned in 1754.

The chapel was enlarged 1864-7 but the priory was dissolved mid-19th century.

A new church was built and opened 17 March 1965. The old church was demolished in 1973. A library was later built on the site.
