= Athy Cricket Club =

Cricket club in County Kildare, Ireland

Athy Cricket Club was founded in 1872 and was one of the first cricket clubs in Kildare.

== Honours ==
The club won the first ever Leinster intermediate cup in 1895 and again in 1896.

The club won the midland plate in 1990 and the Griffin Hawe Cup in 1993.
