= Kilberry, County Kildare =

Village in County Kildare, Ireland

Kilberry Irish: Cill Bhearaigh
- Village
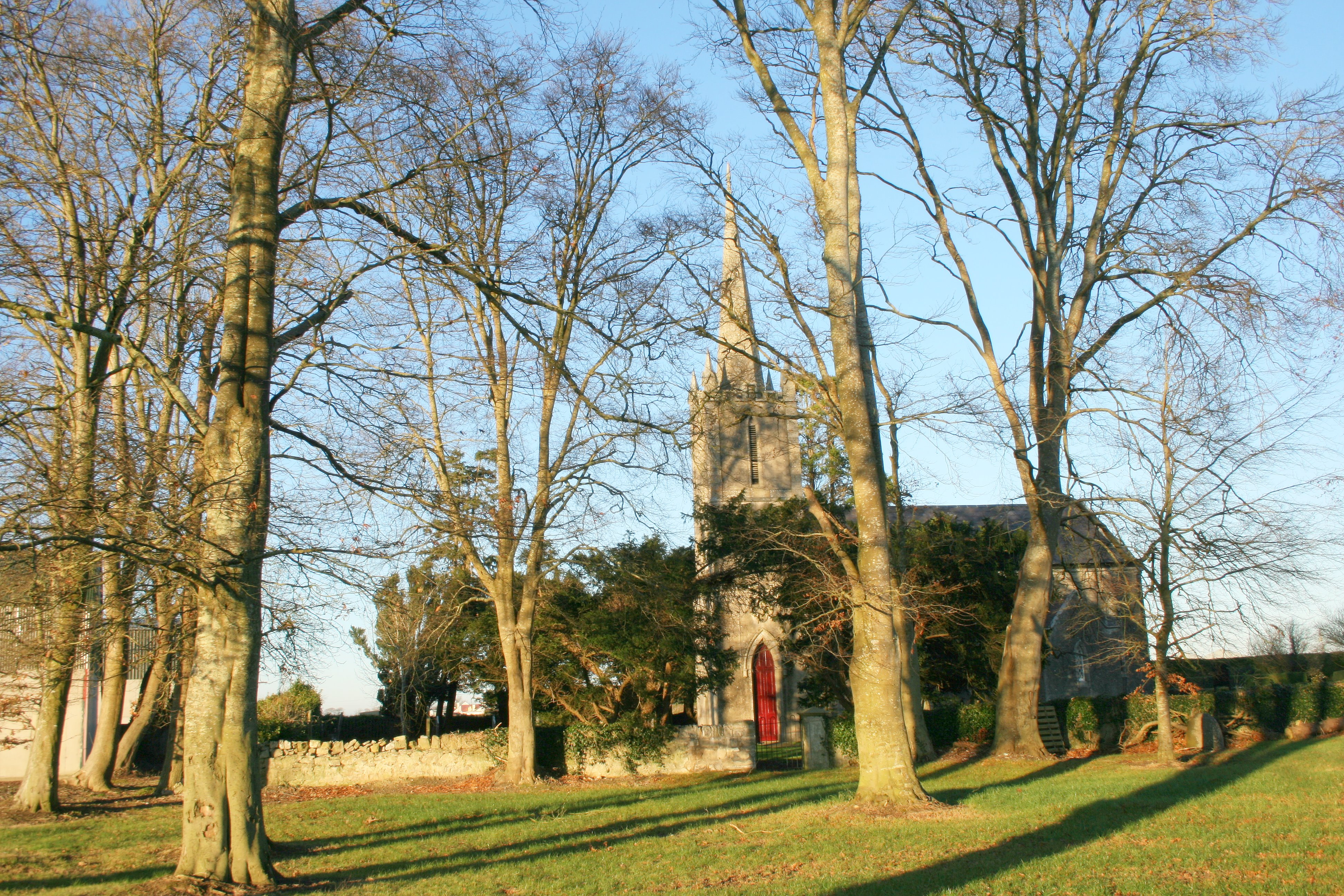
- Kilberry Church of Ireland church (1833)

- Location in Ireland
- Coordinates: 53.0333°N 7.0177°W
- Country: Ireland
- Province: Leinster
- County: County Kildare
- Elevation: 60 m (200 ft)

Population (2016)
  - Total: 400
- Irish Grid Reference: S659985

Kilberry (Irish: Cill Bhearaigh) is a village in County Kildare, Ireland. It is located on the R417 regional road in the valley of the River Barrow 4 km north of Athy. Rheban Castle lies to the west. At the time of the 2016 census, the village had a population of 400 people. The village is in a townland and civil parish of the same name.

== See also ==
- List of towns and villages in Ireland
- List of abbeys and priories in Ireland (County Kildare)
