= White's Castle =

Castle in Athy, County Kildare, Ireland

- An Caisleán Bán / Caisleán de Faoite (Irish)
- White Castle
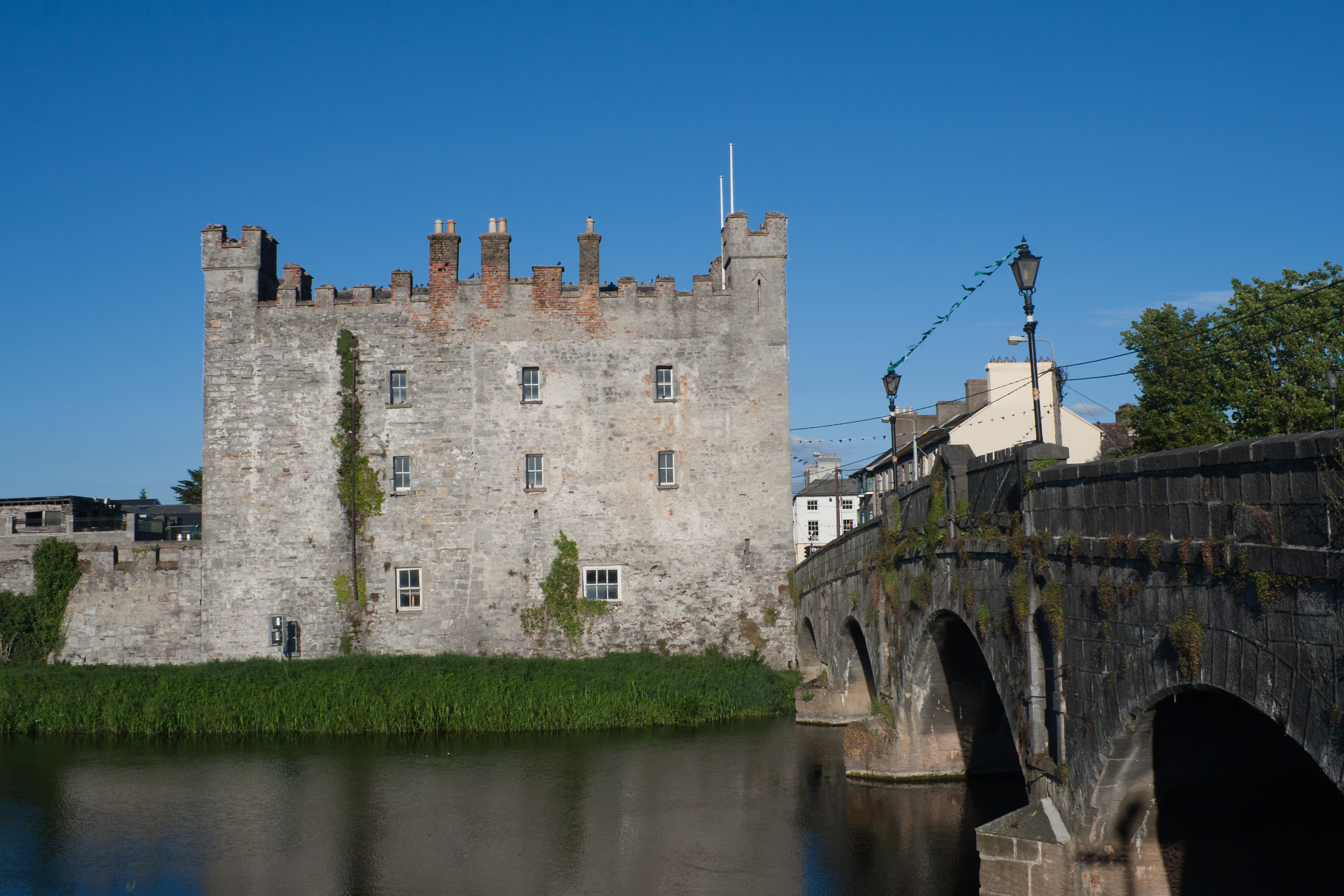
- White's Castle viewed from the west

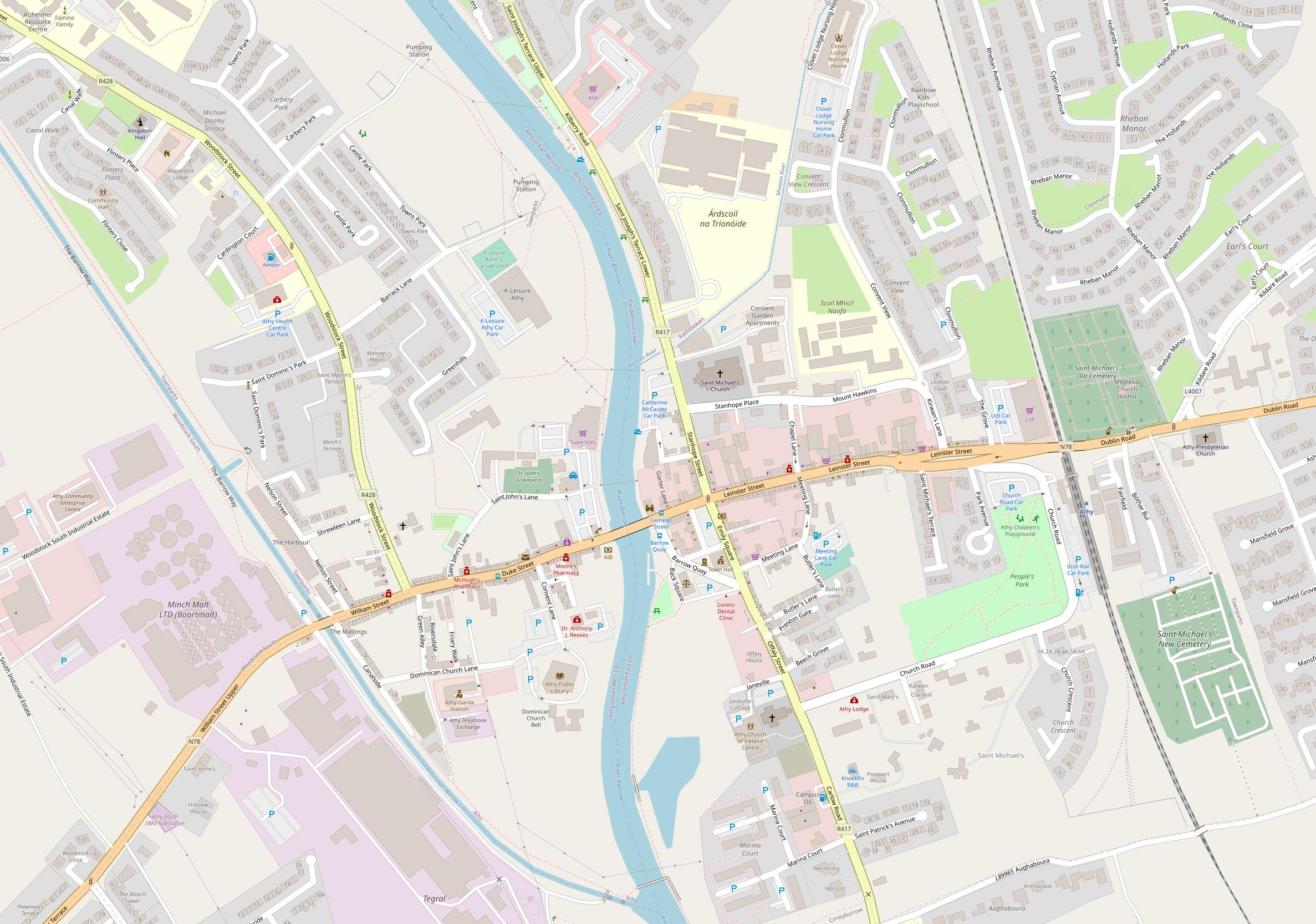
- Location within Athy Location within Ireland
- 52.9923°N 6.9845°W
- Type: Tower house
- Location: Duke Street, Athy, County Kildare, Ireland

History
- Built: 1527 (on site of earlier 15th century castle)

Site notes
- Architectural styles: Norman, Tudor
- Owner: Dolores Cahill

White's Castle is a 16th-century tower house in Athy, County Kildare, Ireland. Built on the site of an earlier 15th-century castle, White's Castle was built to guard the main river crossing in Athy (Irish: Baile Átha Í, meaning 'town of the ford of Ae') and was extended over successive centuries.

== Location ==
White's Castle is located in the centre of Athy, on the east bank of the River Barrow, overlooking Crom Abú Bridge.

It is three-storey tower house with a battered base. On the right of the main doorway is a depiction of coat-of-arms of the Earl of Kildare.

== History ==
Though much of the current structure dates to the 16th century, there was likely an earlier structure on this site, as a 1297 document records that David Fitz le Feure was held in "the ward of Athy".

A Norman tower house was built on the site in 1417 by John Talbot, 1st Earl of Shrewsbury, King's Lieutenant, during the reign of King Henry V, to protect the new bridge over the River Barrow. William Scryvener was constable of the castle between 1422 and 1426. By 1505, this castle was derelict and Gerald FitzGerald, 8th Earl of Kildare was asked to rebuild it. Work was done on the castle during the reign of Henry VIII, with Lord Leonard Grey writing to Thomas Cromwell about the castle in 1536. In 1573, Richard Coosen, Sovereign of Athy added a crucifixion plaque on the left side of the original doorway. Construction of the fortified house was complete around 1575. It was originally known as the White Castle or the New Castle, with "White's Castle" being a later corruption of the name.

Some sources record a matching tower on the west end of the bridge: a 1516 reads that the Monastery of St. Thomas granted the use of a castle on the west end of the bridge to the Earl of Kildare, while a 1556 map shows castles on both sides of the bridge. No trace of this western castle survives, if it ever existed.

The southern wing of the house was a four-storey tower house. The castle was an important site during the Irish Confederate Wars (1641–1653), when it went back and forth between Royal and Confederate hands: Owen Roe O'Neill took it in 1645, the Royalists took it in 1648, then Cromwell arrived in 1649.

In the early eighteenth century, the building was redeveloped for use as a gaol, and by 1730 became the local prison. It had nine cells and was notorious for its poor conditions.

Between 1795 and 1802, a three-storey rectangular extension was added to the north end, and battlements were added; the line of the original west wall of the castle can be easily seen around the halfway point of the current wall. After the 1798 rebellion the castle was used as a prison for Irish rebels.

A small extension was added to the north end in 1830 and the building was used as an Irish Constabulary barracks. Sash windows were added in 1872. In the late 19th century, it was transformed into a private dwelling. It belonged to the Doyle and Norman families until being sold in 2005 for €1.3 million; in 2012 it went on sale again for just €195,000.

In 2019 the castle was sold for €450,000. On 17 March 2021, the castle's then owner, Dolores Cahill, organised a St Patrick's Day party at the castle in defiance of COVID-19 pandemic restrictions on social gatherings.

In 2025, Cahill was approached to sell the castle to the local community, who feared it was falling into disrepair.

== Gallery ==
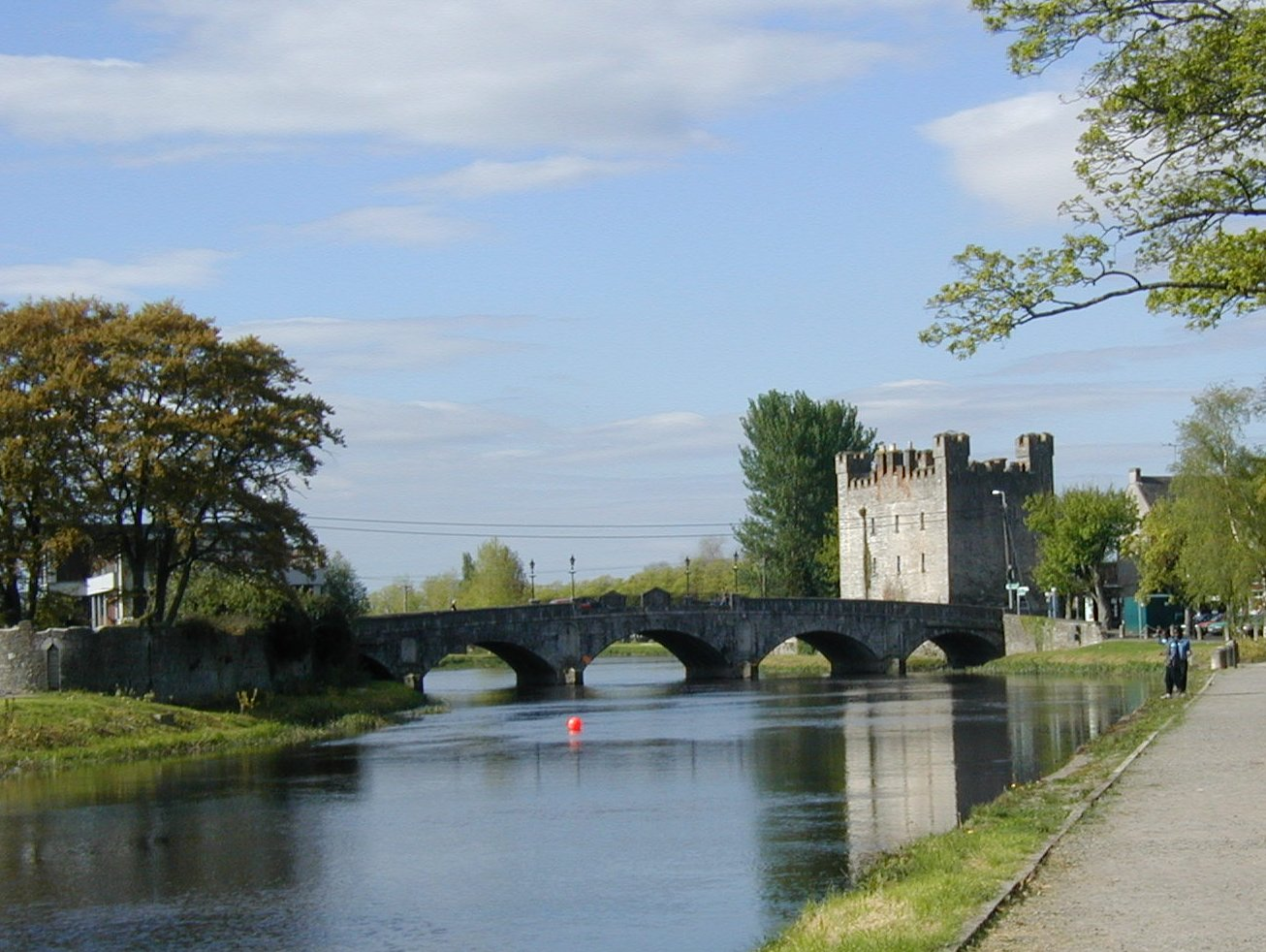
River Barrow and White's Castle

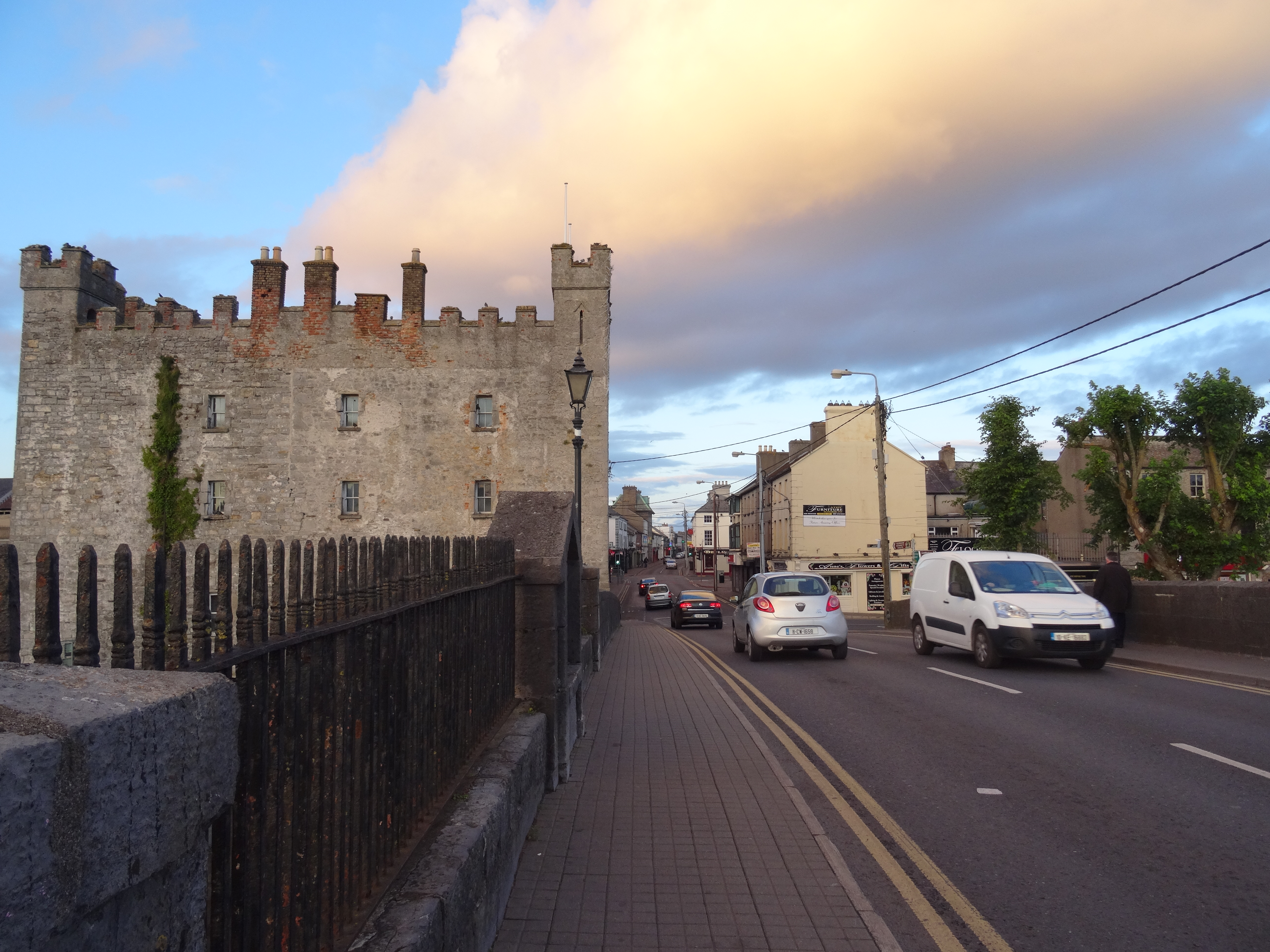
View from road bridge

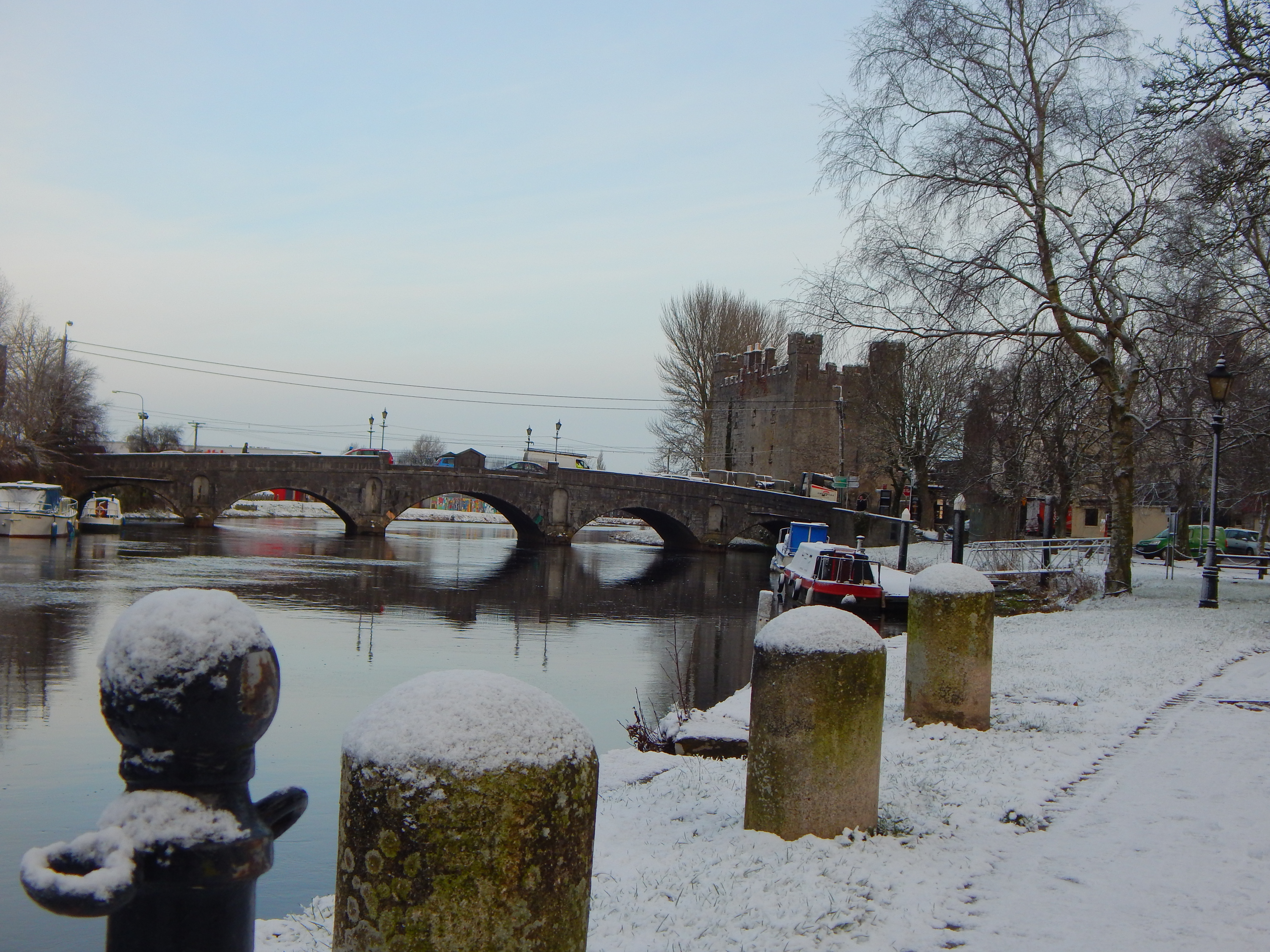
Bridge and castle in winter

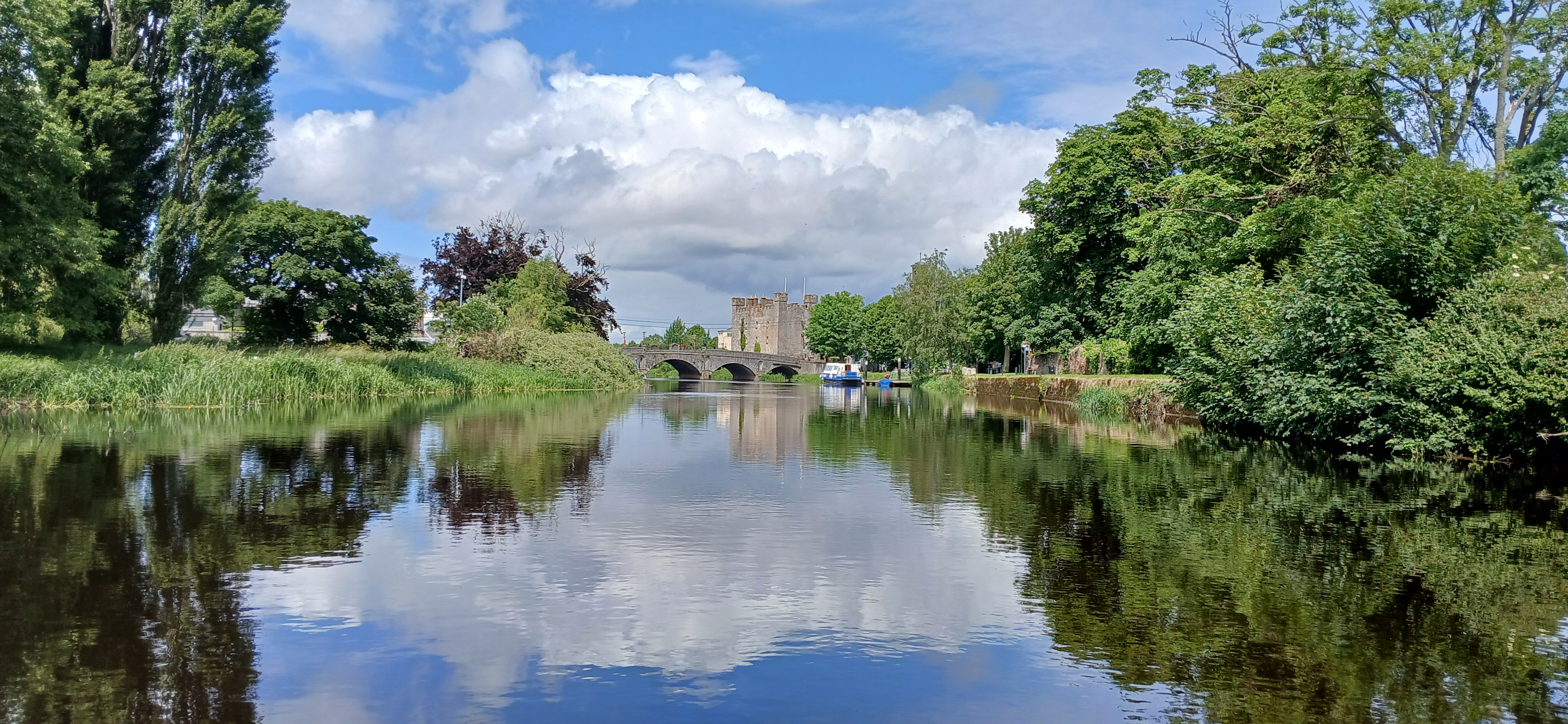
View from the waterway
