= Lesley Fennell =

Irish portrait painter

- Born: Lesley Walsh; England
- Website: http://lesleyfennell.com/biography.html

Lesley Fennell is an Irish Postwar and Contemporary portrait artist.

== Biography ==
Lesley Fennell is the daughter of botanical artist Wendy Walsh. She was born in England c. 1942, her father, Longford man Lt. Col. John Walsh, worked in the British Army until she was sixteen. He then moved to Trinity College Dublin when he took a job there. Fennell was educated in boarding school in the United Kingdom. She attended the National College of Art and Design in Dublin as well as going to the Byam Shaw School of Art in London. She is an artist, often creating portraits, including of staff in Trinity College. Fennell exhibited widely with the Royal Hibernian Academy, Living Art and Oireachtas Exhibitions. She has won a number of awards including the Royal Dublin Society Taylor Art Award in 1964 and the Water Colour Society of Ireland - President's Award in 2007.

Fennell married William Fennell in 1968 and raised three children which interrupted her career. She is based in Burtown house in County Kildare and was behind the gardens there.
