= Inchigeelagh =

Village in County Cork, Ireland

Inchigeelagh Inse Geimhleach
- Village
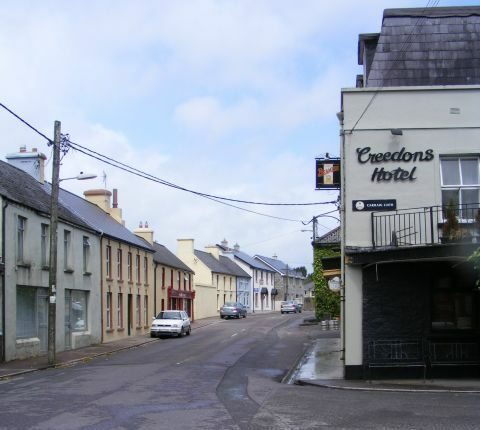
- The R584 road passes through the village

- Location in Ireland
- Coordinates: 51.842°N 9.127°W
- Country: Ireland
- Province: Munster
- County: County Cork
- District: Macroom

Population (2016)
  - Total: 153

Inchigeelagh (Irish: Inse Geimhleach, meaning 'island of the prisoner or hostages') is a small village, townland and civil parish in County Cork, Ireland. The village is just outside a Gaeltacht area. Inchigeelagh is part of the Dáil constituency of Cork North-West.

The River Lee passes through the village. The nearby 'pater noster' string of lakes collectively known as Lough Allua were once popular with anglers and are now fished for large pike, perch and some brown trout. The decline of fishing has coincided with the loss of salmon on the River Lee following the erection of the Carrigadrohid and Inniscarra hydroelectric dams down-river between 1952 and 1957. This led to the subsequent decline in the fortunes of the village as a location for angling.

A hotel was built in 1810 to serve the horse-drawn coaches of tourists travelling the Prince of Wales route to Kenmare and Killarney. It operated as The Lake Hotel (though it never had a view of the lake) until it closed in 2014. Another hotel was built across the street as Corcoran's Hotel but it became Creedon's Hotel and is now run by the fourth generation of the Creedon family. Efforts have been made to campaign for works to be done on the two dams that prevent salmon from accessing the Lee river's upper reaches and a 2015 documentary, titled River Runner, publicised the issues of the river.

Inchigeelagh was the meeting place for the Lyre Company Irish Volunteers, in April 1916, from where they intended to collect some of the rifles sent by Roger Casement on board the ship Aud for use in the 1916 Easter Rising. However, the ship was captured by the British Navy before it could deliver the arms.

== People ==
- Máire Bhuí Ní Laoghaire (1774–c.1848), a composer of oral poetry in Munster Irish, is buried in Inchigeelah
- Chris Óg Jones (b.1998), Gaelic footballer
- Michael John O'Leary , Recipient of the Victoria Cross
- Cathal Vaughan (b.1994), Gaelic footballer

== Gallery ==
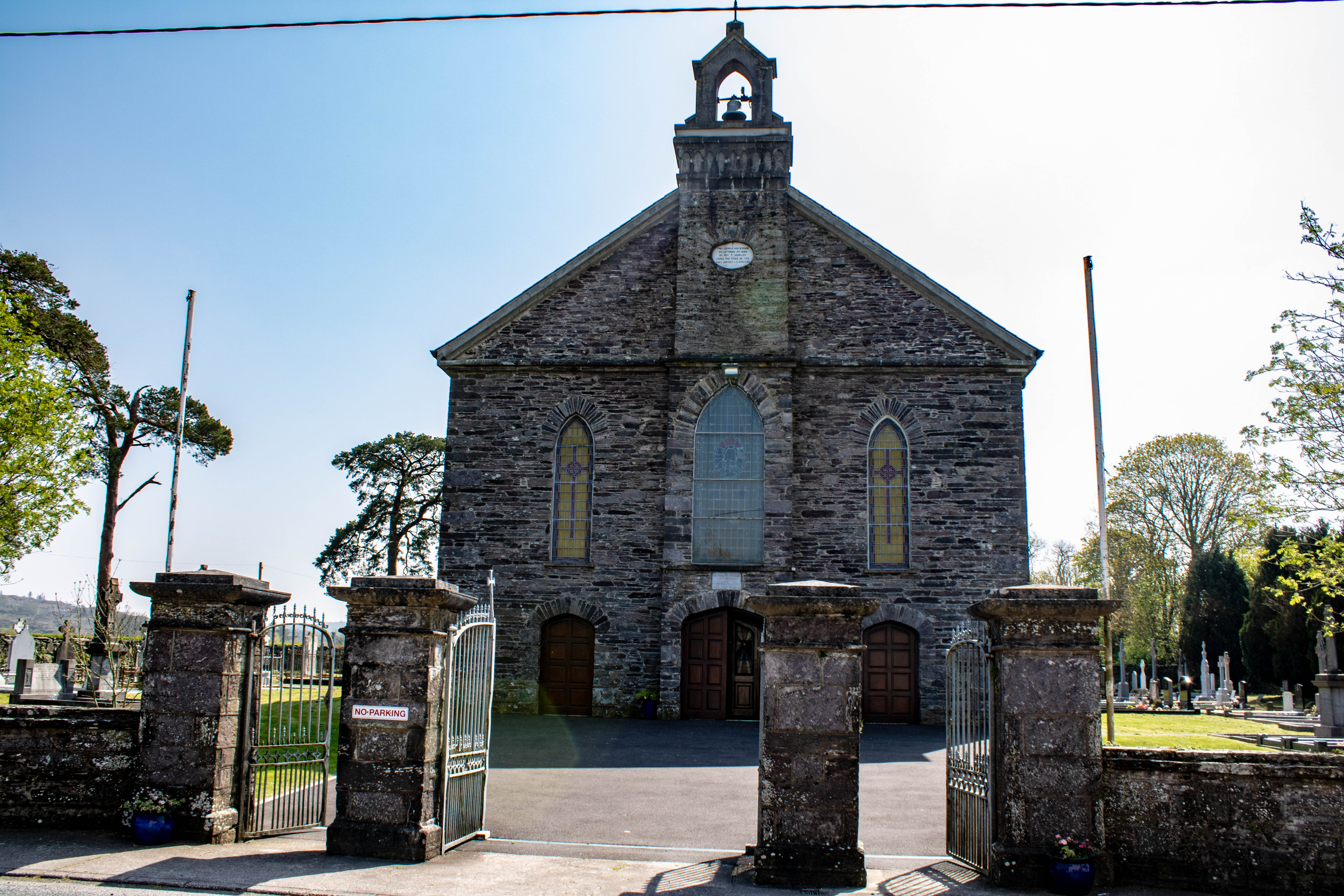
St Finbarr's Church

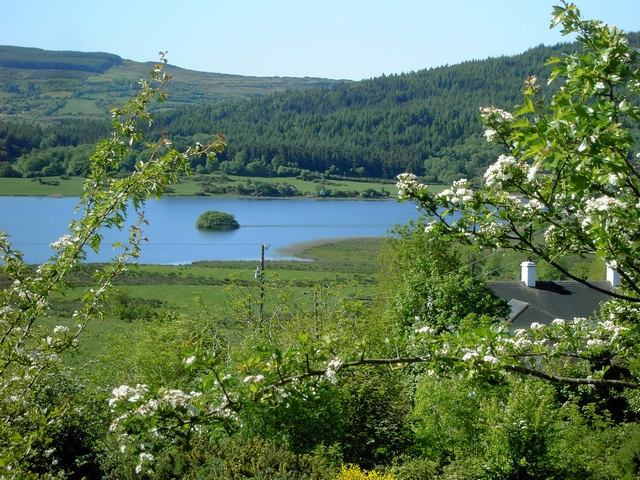
Crannóg, Tir na Spideoge

Carrignacurra Castle

Bridge over the Lee at Inchigeelagh

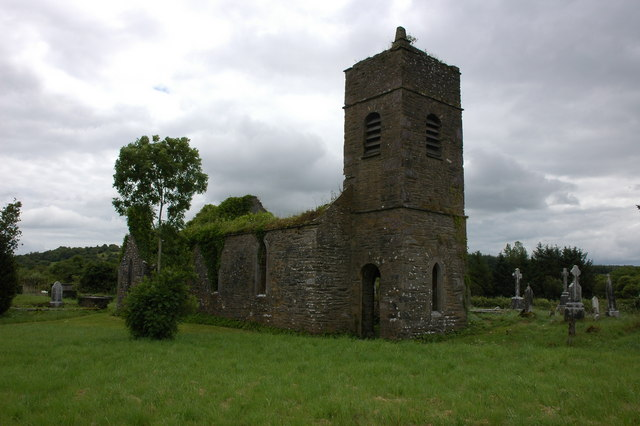
Old cemetery and church at Inchigeelagh
