= Carrigrohane Straight =

Segment of road in County Cork, Ireland

Coordinates: 51°53′44.78″N 8°32′18.37″W

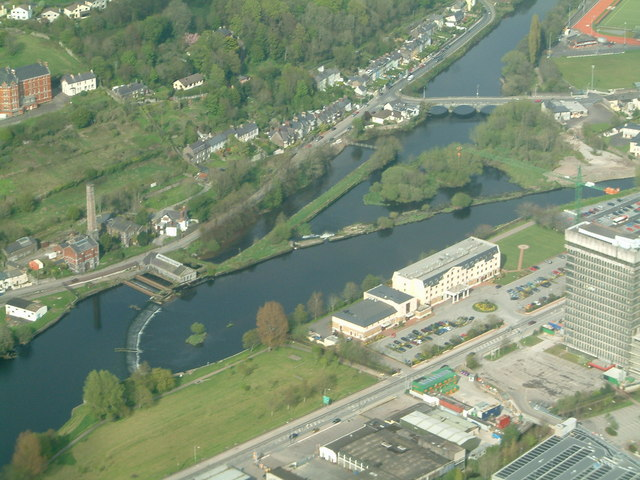
The County Hall (bottom right) is at the eastern end of the Carrigrohane Straight

The Carrigrohane Straight, or Straight Road, is a straight segment of road that stretches for 2.75 miles (4.43 km), from the edge of Cork west to Carrigrohane in County Cork, Ireland. It is just over 140 years old, and now forms part of the N22 National Primary route between Cork and Tralee.

== Construction ==
The Carrigrohane Straight was built around the late 1830s and early 1840s. Earlier maps such as Taylor and Skinner's Maps of the Roads of Ireland (1776), or a map of Cork's Parliamentary Borough in 1832, do not show any track or path in this area. However, the first edition of the Ordnance Survey Map (1841–42) shows that work was in progress on the new road linking Cork city with Carrigrohane and Leemount Cross.

Before the building of the Straight, a few houses were to be seen in this area. An osiery lay at the city side, consisting of a swamp where willow trees grew. An expanse of green could be seen as fields stretched for miles around. The tradition that the road was a "Famine Road" may be partly true. Even though the Straight itself was built by 1842, the section as far as Leemount Cross (including Leemount Bridge) may not have been completed until during the famine (1845–50).

The building of the Straight, and its extension on to Leemount Cross, which necessitated the building of two bridges – one over the tail race of Carrigrohane Flour Mills, the second over the River Lee – changed the traffic pattern to the west of the city. Before the Straight and Leemount Bridge were built, the Model Farm Road took traffic to Ballincollig and Macroom, while the Lee Road led to Blarney, Coachford and Inniscarra. After the construction of the Straight and Leemount Bridge, a straight and flatter route reduced the importance of these roads and the Coachford or Iniscarra traffic could now merge with the Macroom traffic by crossing Leemount Bridge.

== Tramway ==
In the 1880s, the building of the Muskerry Tram increased the importance of the Straight. The city terminus was on the present site of Jury's Hotel, while the line ended at Blarney, Donoughmore and Coachford. Along its route there were twenty one stations, one of which was at Carrigrohane at the western end of the Straight, and a second one at Leemount Cross.

It used to be said that passengers on the Muskerry Tram, or the "Hook and Eye" as it was sometimes called, could pick blackberries from the carriages as the train was moving, such was its speed. The tickets had to be checked in one carriage, and then, while the train was still moving, the ticket collector had to move to the next carriage along the outside. This procedure was very dangerous because of the rocking and swaying of the carriages.

One of the most unusual incidents of the history of the Muskerry Tram was a crash with a steamroller in 1926. The steamroller was involved in the resurfacing of the Carrigrohane Straight, when tram and steamroller collided. The tram was de-railed, a few people fainted, but nobody was hurt. The Muskerry Tram was eventually closed down in December 1934.

== Flooding ==
The Straight is very flat and subject to both tidal and river flooding. It occurred regularly during the winter, when the swollen rivers burst due to heavy rain, and the road was also affected by spring tides. A contributory factor is the confluence of two rivers with the Lee at Carrigrohane. The Shournagh joins the Lee at Crubeen Bridge on the Lee Road, and a smaller river, the Carrig, joins the Lee at the junction under Carrigrohane Castle, and is forded by what was known as Cromwell’s Bridge. The worst affected area of the Straight is the centre, near Inichigaggin Lane, so that residential and commercial development has been limited to the eastern and western ends of the Straight. The building of the Carrigadrohid and Inniscarra Dams has enabled some control to be put on the flooding so it is now not as severe.

The most dramatic floods occurred in the years 1870, 1916 and 1962. The flood of 1916 was the largest, reaching Inichigaggin Lane and having a height of 28 feet (8.5 m) above sea level. The 1962 flood was a tidal flood, which flooded the city centre of Cork, including the Courthouse, to a height of 19 feet (5.8 m) above sea level.

== Cork Exhibition (1932) ==
The Straight became the site of the Cork Industrial and Agricultural Fair in 1932. After considerable local controversy, agreement was reached to hold the Exhibition at the eastern end of the Straight. Tim Corcoran, chairman of the County Council at this time, supervised the erection of the necessary buildings. Building commenced on Monday, 10 August 1931. The initial operations consisted of the erection of the advertising posters on the front of the site along the Straight. The fair was opened on Wednesday, 11 May 1932, and continued until Sunday, 2 October. There were 13 acres (5.3 ha) of amusements, a car park which held 3,000 vehicles, flower beds and shrubberies, and a bandstand in the centre, demonstration plots for agricultural and horticultural sections, and a miniature railway running around the grounds.

== Surface ==
The original surface of Carrigrohane Straight was limestone. In 1927, the County Council and Corporation, who both controlled sections of the Straight, laid reinforced concrete. The Straight was one of the first concrete road surfaces in Ireland, or even Great Britain. In the early days, concrete surfaces were laid in slabs, with expansion joints of bitumen to take up expansion and contractions as the temperature affected them. The reinforced concrete consisted of a layer of mesh steel covered with concrete in sections approximately 20 to 30 feet (6.1 to 9.1 m) long, and several inches thick. Concrete was used because it was thought to be suitable for boggy ground. In the late 1920s and early 1930s, a number of concrete roads were constructed over bog in Northern Ireland, for example the Ballymena to Ballymoney road.

The South of Ireland Asphalt Company (S.I.A.C.) was engaged in the surfacing of the Straight, and the concrete was hand laid. After the closure of the Muskerry Tram, the tracks were removed in 1935, and the area they occupied was then concreted, adding about 10 feet (3.0 m) to the width of the road. In recent years, Cork Corporation has covered this section with tar macadam, but the section outside the city still has the original concrete, and the extra width of concrete laid after the tram tracks were removed. This can be seen on the south side of the road.

== Racing ==
Due to the flat surface of the Straight, it proved suitable for speed trials. The Straight, together with Model Farm Road, forms a circle, which proved suitable for racing. During the 1920s and 1930s, both motorbikes, such as the Yamaha 750 cc, and cars, such as the Ingersoll-Rand Formula One Shadow, featured in speed trials and racing competitions. Drivers in these competitions came from across Europe, and crowds came from all over Cork and Munster to see the trials. The 1938 Cork Grand Prix, for example, reportedly attracted 70,000 spectators.

Rosemary Smith established an Irish land speed record of 156.101 mph on the Straight in 1978, driving a seven-litre Jaguar XJ6.

In later years, the Straight has been used for speed trials, including land speed records for motorbikes and cars. The Carrigrohane Straight featured in the "Cork 800" festivities (which marked the eighth centenary of the city). This included a "Great Race" and "Steeple Jack".
