= R584 road (Ireland) =

Road in Ireland

R584 road
- Bóthar R584
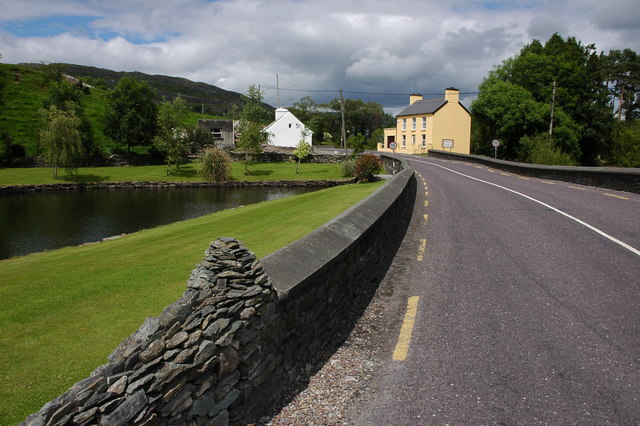
- R584 at Ballingeary crossing River Lee

Route information
- Length: 48.4 km (30.1 mi)

Major junctions
- From: N22 at the Coolcower Roundabout on the N22 bypass in Coolcower, County Cork
- R587 at Teergay (for Dunmanway); R585 at Breeney Beg (Kealkill)
- To: N71 at Ballylickey Bridge

Location
- Country: Ireland

Highway system
- Roads in Ireland; Motorways; Primary; Secondary; Regional
| ← R583 | → R585 |

The R584 road is a regional road in west County Cork, Ireland.

The R584 travels southwest from the N22 near Macroom on the new N22 bypass via Ballingeary and following the course of the River Lee (including Lough Allua) to reach Gougane Barra. Gougane Barra is a scenic area including a Forest Park and Gougane Lake, the source of the Lee. The section of the road near Macroom provides access to The Gearagh, a River Lee nature reserve of rare alluvial forest, unique in Ireland. From Gougane Barra, the road travels through the Pass of Keimaneigh in the Shehy Mountains and onward to end at the N71 at Ballylickey. The R584 is 48.4 km (30.1 mi) long.
