= R587 road (Ireland) =

Road in Ireland

Coordinates: 54.814795°N 7.896134°W

R587 road
- Bóthar R587
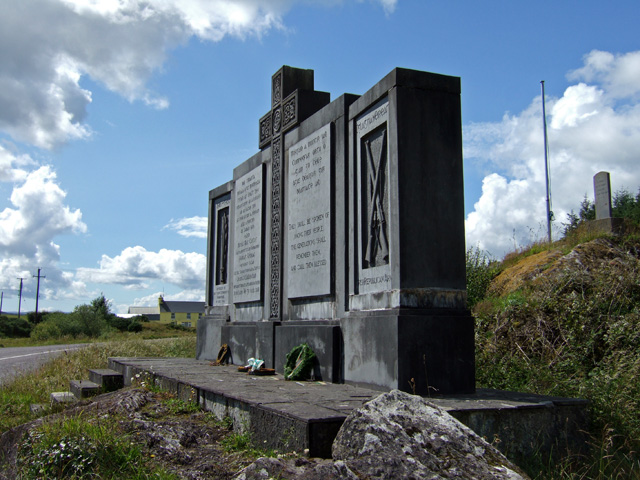
- Kilmichael Ambush monument on the R587

Route information
- Length: 20.4 km (12.7 mi)

Major junctions
- From: R584 Toonsbridge
- Crosses River Lee; Passes through Kilmichael; R585 Shanlaragh; Crosses Bandon River
- To: R586 Dunmanway

Location
- Country: Ireland

Highway system
- Roads in Ireland; Motorways; Primary; Secondary; Regional

The R587 road is a regional road in Ireland, located in County Cork.
