= Carrigadrohid =

Village in County Cork, Ireland

Carrigadrohid Carraig an Droichid
- Village
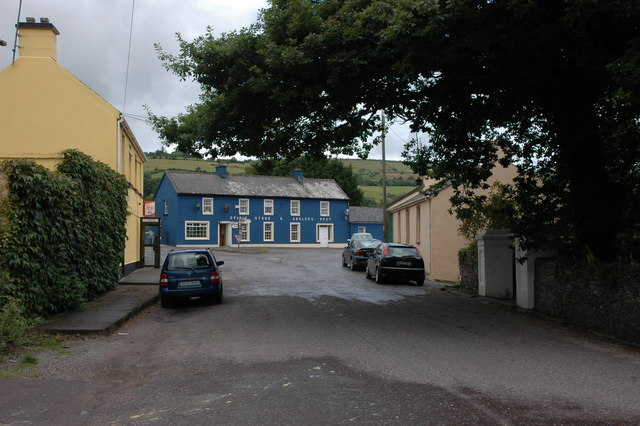
- Road junction in Carrigadrohid

- Location in Ireland
- Coordinates: 51°54′06″N 8°51′10″W
- Country: Ireland
- Province: Munster
- County: County Cork
- Time zone: UTC+0 (WET)
  - Summer (DST): UTC-1 (IST (WEST))
- Irish Grid Reference: W 4136 7248

Carrigadrohid (Irish: Carraig an Droichid, meaning 'rock of the bridge') is a townland and village in the civil parish of Aghinagh, County Cork, Ireland. It is situated on the north bank of the River Lee, with the nearby village of Canovee to the south. Carrigadrohid is part of the Dáil constituency of Cork North-West.

== Castle ==
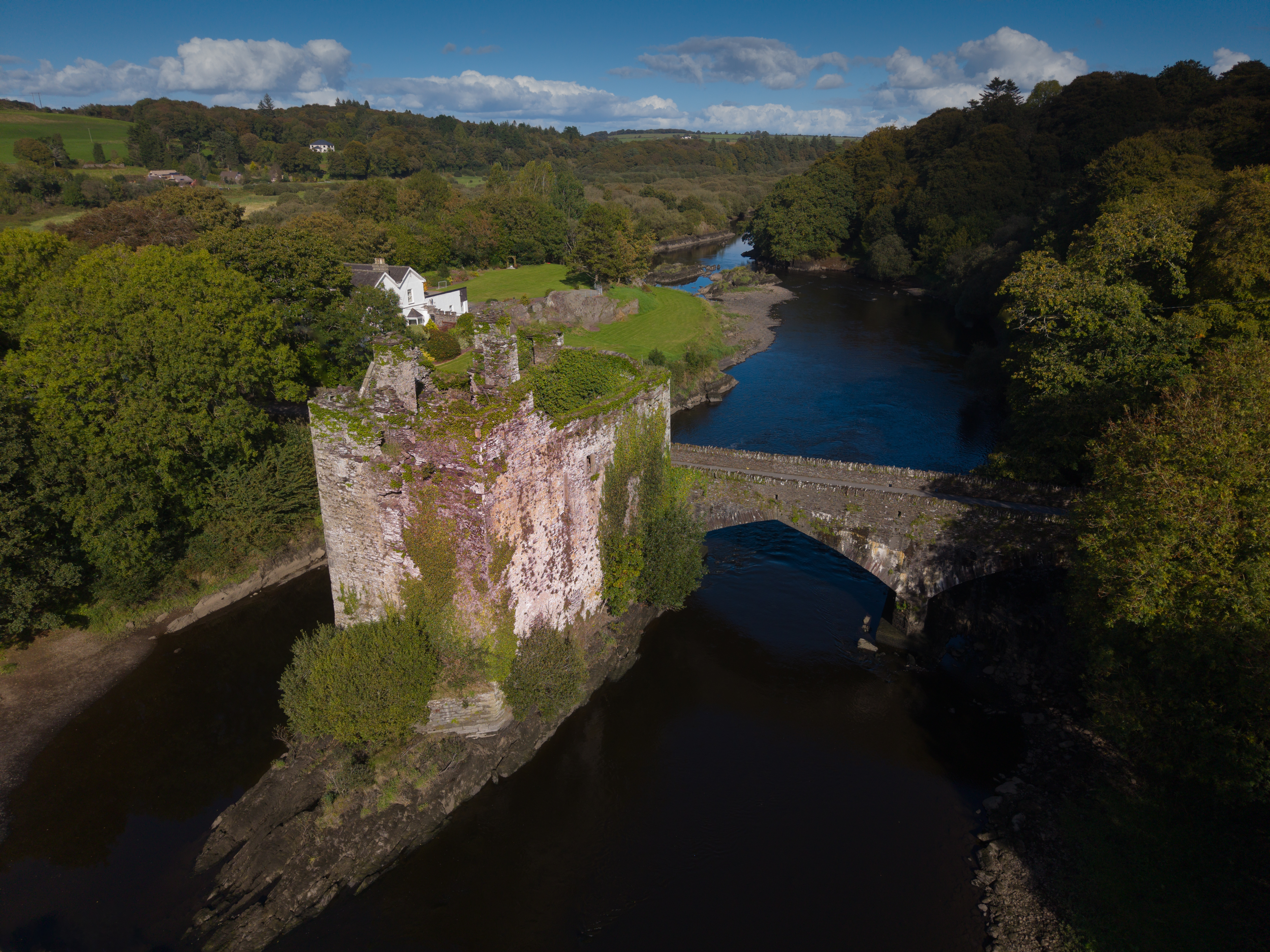
Castle and bridge

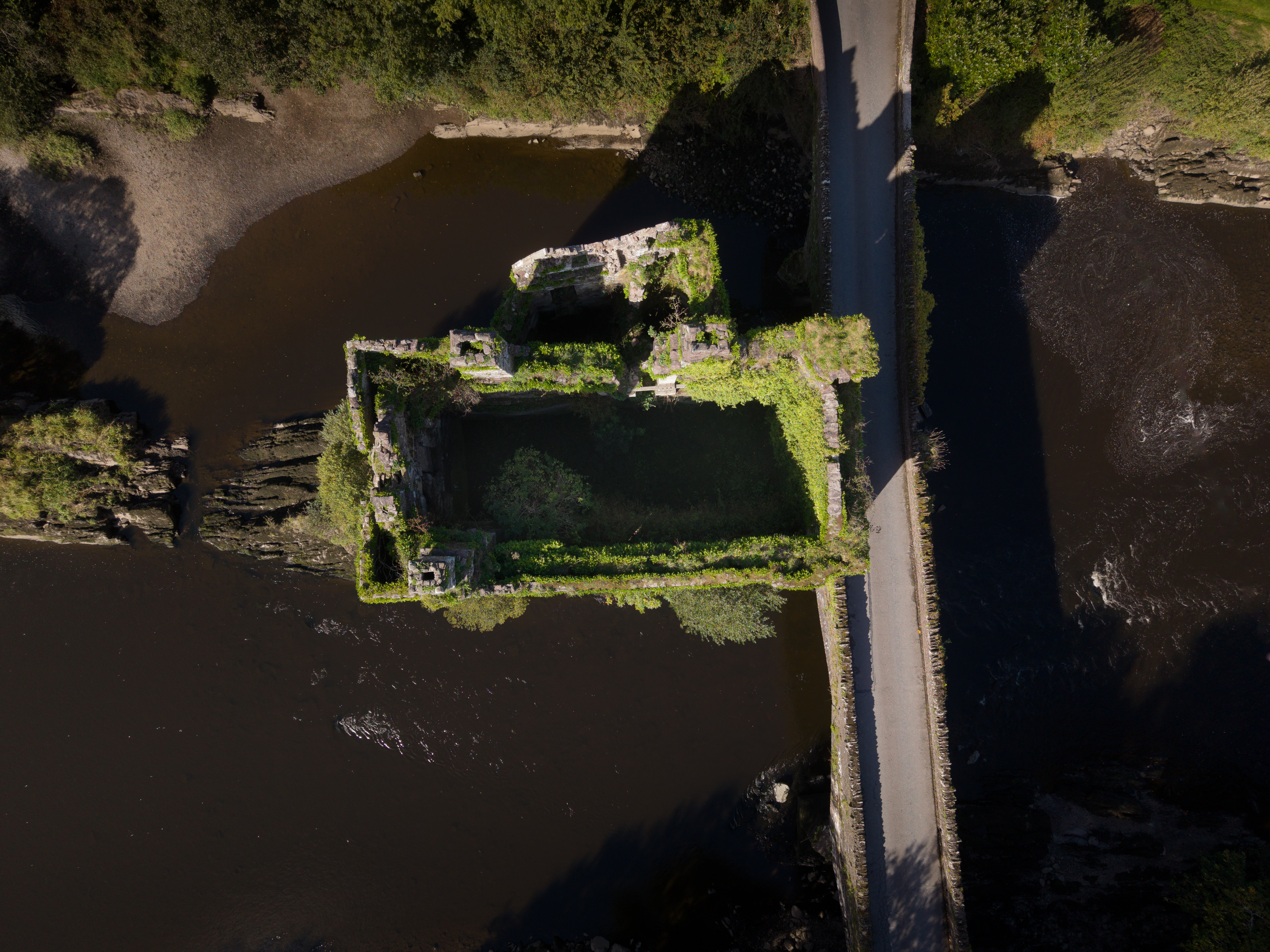
Nadir view with smaller annex clearly visible

Carrigadrohid castle stands on a rock in the middle of the river Lee, adjacent to the bridge which gives the village its name. It was erected in 1455 by the MacCarthys of Muskerry, with an extension to the east and an annex to the north being added in subsequent centuries. In 1650, it was besieged by Parliamentary forces following the Battle of Macroom, and Boetius MacEgan, the Bishop of Ross, was hanged by the reins of his own horse outside the castle having refused to implore the Irish garrison to surrender to the Cromwellian army.

The MacCarthys were dispossessed, and the castle ended up in the hands of the Bowen family. It was last inhabited in 1750, and in 1770 it was recorded as falling into the state of disrepair. In the 20th century further erosion and acts of vandalism contributed to progressing deterioration of the ruins. In 1950, on the 300th anniversary of Bishop Boetius's death, a local effort was made to have the castle preserved, but it was unsuccessful. In 1998, a local group and an initiative called Carrigadrohid Castle Project Company Ltd. was formed with the aim of preserving the castle. In 2005, cracks were detected in the supporting elements, and a serious risk to the integrity of the structure was identified. The owner of the castle agreed to having the necessary repairs done. In 2006, the Office of Public Works was tasked with starting the initial phase of conservation and safety work where the castle meets the public road, with the budget of 100,000 euro. It was also estimated that the full conservation project would cost up to 1 million euro, and that it was beyond the scope of the city council.

The positioning of the castle on the river is what makes it unique among Irish castles. Otherwise the structure is typical of Irish tower houses, with rectangular main block and an annex added on its northern side. The annex included a staircase.

== Sport ==
Carrigadrohid is the home of Canovee GAA Club (Irish: Cumann Luthchleas Gael Cheann an Mhaighe), an intermediate Gaelic football club with a catchment area centred on Carrigadrohid and extending south and east to Aherla, Farnanes and Cloughduv. Canovee GAA has a large playing field and two smaller training pitches on the club's main campus - with playing fields at Lehane's inch, on the banks of the Lee, near the hydroelectric power station.

== See also ==
- List of towns and villages in Ireland
