= Carrigadrohid Lake =

Reservoir on the River Lee, Ireland

- Loch Charraig an Droichid (Irish)
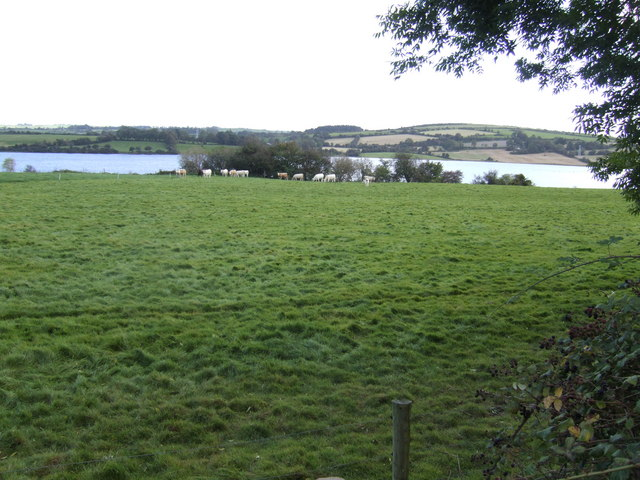
- Dairy pasture by Carrigadrohid Lake

- Location within Ireland
- Location: Ireland
- Coordinates: 51.897162°N 8.876642°W
- Primary inflows: River Lee
- Primary outflows: River Lee
- Basin countries: Ireland
- First flooded: 1952–57
- Surface area: 5.8 km^{2} (2.2 sq mi)
- Surface elevation: 62 m (203 ft)
- Settlements: Carrigadrohid

Carrigadrohid Lake (Irish: Loch Charraig an Droichid) is a lake on the River Lee in County Cork, in the province of Munster, in the south of Ireland. Situated upstream (westward) of Carrigadrohid village, the lake is actually a reservoir, created for the Carrigadrohid hydroelectric power station, which was erected in the 1950s.

The lake also serves as a fishery for bream, rudd, roach, northern pike and perch.

== See also ==
- List of loughs in Ireland
