= Inniscarra Lake =

Reservoir in County Cork, Ireland

- Taiscumar Reservoir
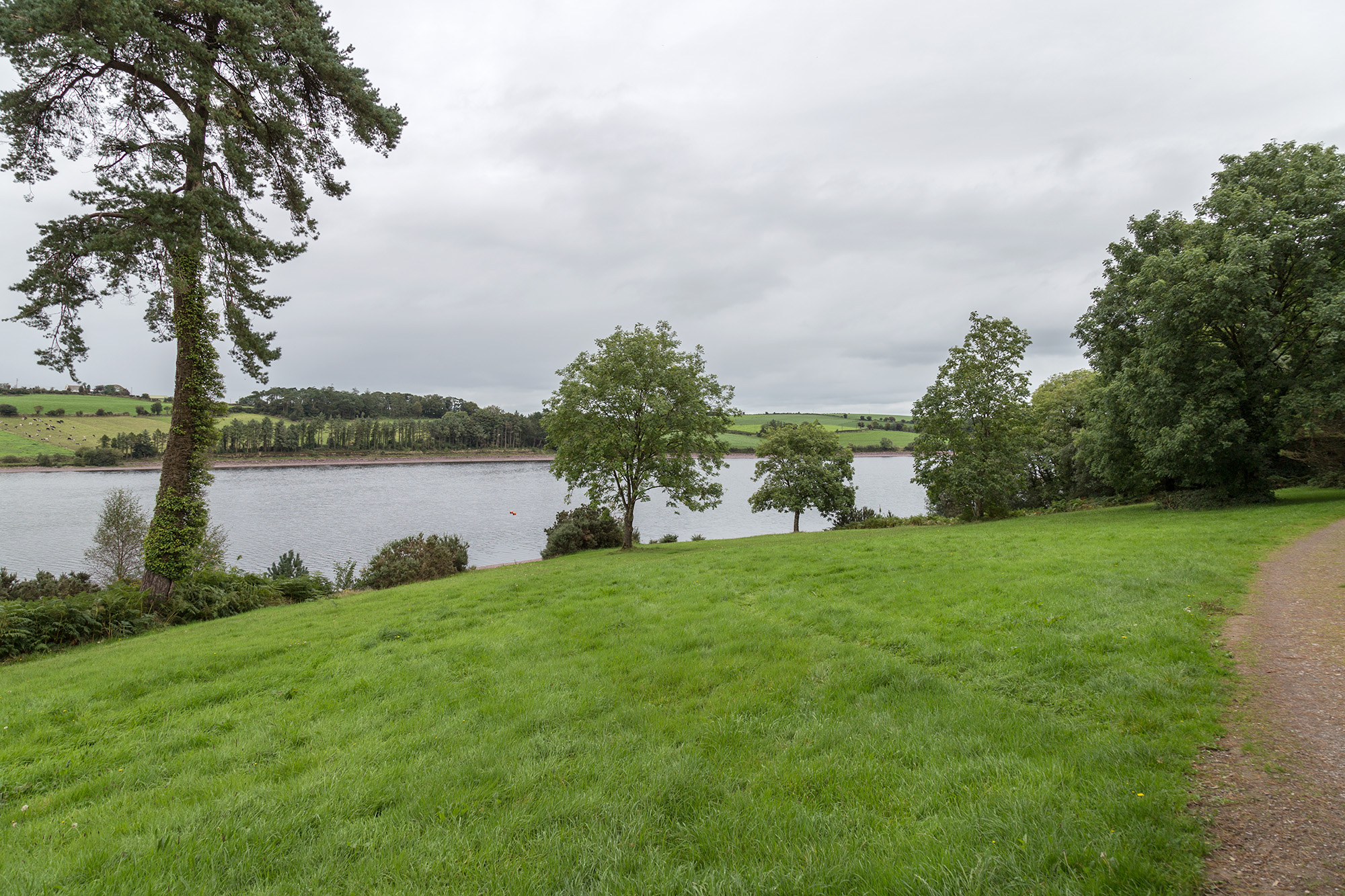
- Inniscarra Lake (Taiscumar Reservoir) from Farran Forrest Park

- Location within Ireland
- Location: County Cork
- Coordinates: 51.904°N 8.692°W
- Type: Reservoir
- Etymology: Inniscarra (civil parish)
- Primary inflows: River Lee
- Primary outflows: River Lee
- Built: 1952–1956
- First flooded: 1957
- Surface area: 4.9 km^{2} (1.9 sq mi)

Inniscarra Lake is located along the River Lee in County Cork, Ireland. It is a man-made reservoir formed in the 1950s when Inniscarra Dam was constructed by the Electricity Supply Board. Construction of the dam commenced in 1953, with its floodgates first closed in 1956 and the reservoir fully formed by late 1957.

The National Rowing Center is located on its banks and the Irish National Rowing Championships and other regattas are hosted there. The Coupe de la Jeunesse, a European youth rowing event, was held on Inniscarra Lake in 1999, 2008 and 2018.

The lake is located largely within the civil parish of Inniscarra, and nearby settlements include Farran (on the reservoir's south bank) and Coachford and Dripsey (to the north).

Fish stocks in the reservoir include rudd, roach, carp, perch, gudgeon, eels, pike and bream.

== See also ==
- List of loughs in Ireland
