= Coupe de la Jeunesse =

International rowing regatta

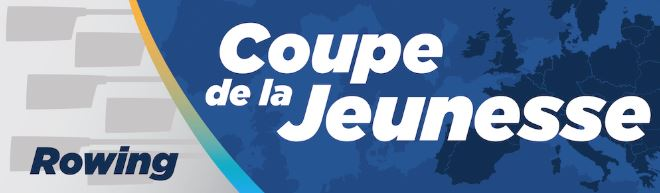
- Sport: Rowing
- Founded: 1985
- No. of teams: 17
- Country: (Austria) AUT (Belgium) BEL (Czech Republic) CZE (Denmark) DEN (France) FRA (Germany) GER (United Kingdom) GBR (Hungary) HUN (Republic of Ireland) IRL (Italy) ITA (Netherlands) NED (Norway) NOR (Poland) POL (Portugal) POR (Spain) ESP (Sweden) SWE (Switzerland) SUI

The Coupe de la Jeunesse is an international rowing regatta rowed over 2,000 m every year. It was founded in 1985 and is open to rowers who are 18 or under by the end of the current calendar year. It is a two-day team event, with points awarded to nations based on finishing position in each category. As a result, a strong overall team is required to take overall victory in the Coupe, and the event has only ever been won by Great Britain (19 wins), Italy (14 wins), and France (8 wins).

Each category is raced separately on the first and second day of the regatta, allowing different Coupe de la Jeunesse event winners on each day. Some countries use this regatta as a destination for athletes who do not reach the standard required for the Junior World Championships.

== Categories raced ==
Events are raced in the following boats (using standard abbreviations):

- Men & Women: 8+, 4-, 2-, 4x, 2x, 1x

In addition a mixed 8+ demonstration event takes place on the Friday evening.

== Competing countries ==
- Austria
- Belgium
- Czech Republic
- Denmark
- France
- Germany
- Great Britain
- Hungary
- Ireland
- Italy
- Netherlands
- Norway
- Poland
- Portugal
- Spain
- Sweden
- Switzerland

== Organisation ==
The Coupe has a four-member executive committee elected by the delegate assembly. As of 2025, the executive committee consisted of:

- Gwenda Stevens, President (Belgium)
- Richard Dennis, Secretary General (Great Britain)
- Judit Meszaros, Technical Assessor (Hungary)
- Michael Zwahlen, Technical Assessor (Switzerland)

== Venues and results ==
Year	Venue	Winner
1985	Candia, Italy	France
1986	Bern, Switzerland	Italy
1987	Ghent, Belgium	Italy
1988	Mantes-la-Jolie, France	France
1989	Candia, Italy	Great Britain
1990	Hazewinkel, Belgium	Italy
1991	Glasgow, Great Britain	France
1992	Schiffenensee, Switzerland	France
1993	Vichy, France	Great Britain
1994	Hazewinkel, Belgium	Great Britain
1995	Bourges, France	France
1996	Amsterdam, Netherlands	France
1997	Holme Pierrepont, Nottingham, Great Britain	Great Britain
1998	Candia, Italy	Great Britain
1999	Inniscarra Lake, Cork, Ireland	Great Britain
2000	Sempach, Switzerland	France
2001	Brive-la-Gaillarde, France	France
2002	Montemor-o-Velho, Portugal	Italy
2003	Hazewinkel, Belgium	Great Britain
2004	Ravenna, Italy	Italy
2005	Dorney Lake, Dorney, Great Britain	Great Britain
2006	Groningen, Netherlands	Great Britain
2007	Varese, Italy	Italy
2008	Inniscarra Lake, Cork, Ireland	Great Britain
2009	Vichy, France	Great Britain
2010	Hazewinkel, Belgium	Italy
2011	Ottensheim, Austria	Italy
2012	Banyoles, Spain	Italy
2013	Lucerne, Switzerland	Great Britain
2014	Libourne, France	Italy
2015	Szeged, Hungary	Italy
2016	Poznań, Poland	Great Britain
2017	Hazewinkel, Belgium	Great Britain
2018	Inniscarra Lake, Cork, Ireland	Great Britain
2019	Corgeno, Italy	Italy
2020	Ottensheim, Austria	[Cancelled]
2021	Ottensheim, Austria	Italy
2022	Castrelo de Mino, Spain	Great Britain
2023	Amsterdam, Netherlands	Great Britain
2024	Račice, Czech Republic	Italy
2025	Ottensheim, Austria	Great Britain
2026	Lucerne, Switzerland	Great Britain
2027	Hazewinkel, Belgium	
