= The Gearagh =

Nature reserve in County Cork, Ireland

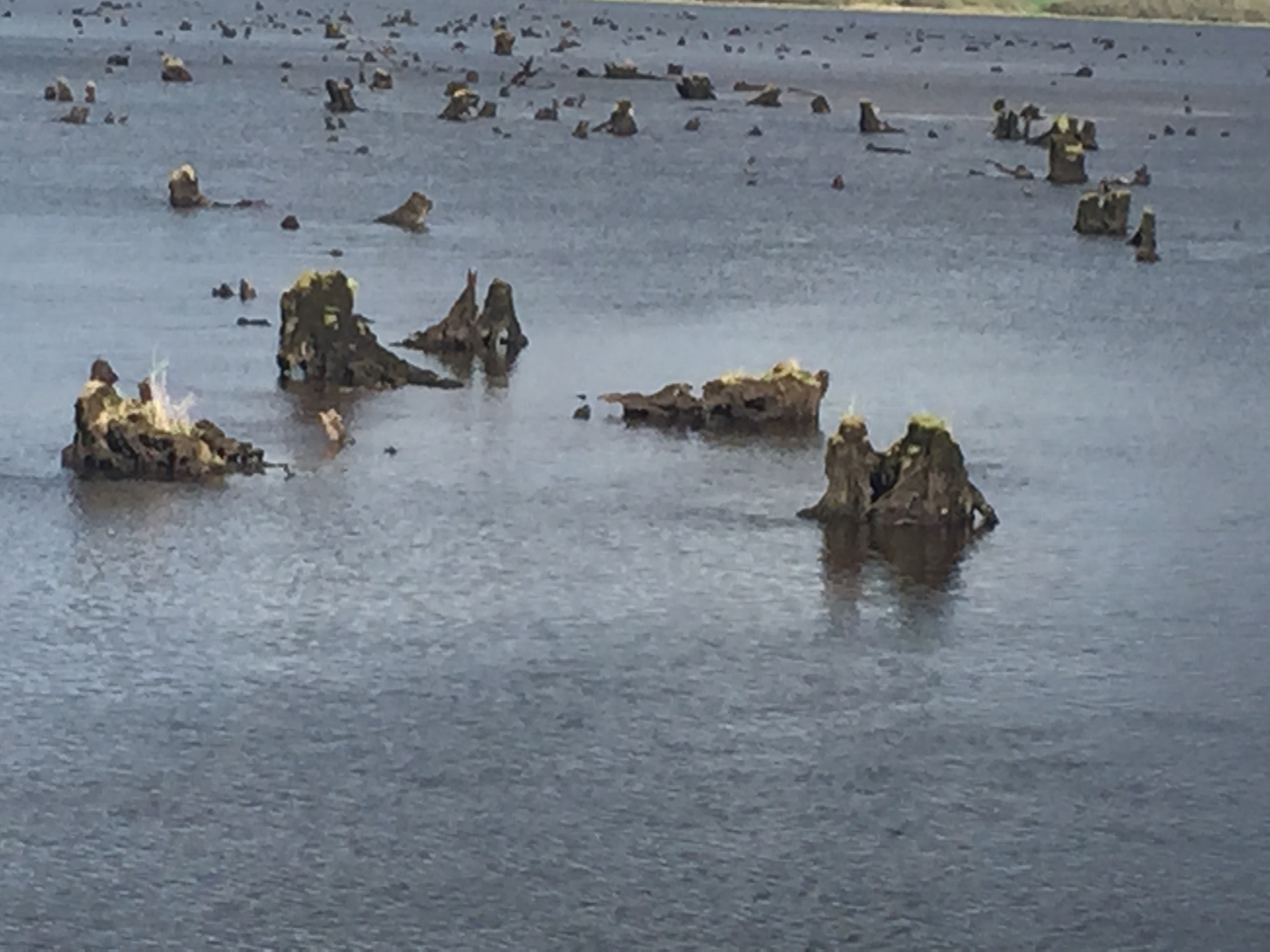
- Ancient oak stumps near the first bridge at the Sleaveen side of the Port road
- Interactive map of The Gearagh
- Location: County Cork, Ireland
- Coordinates: 51.886°N 9.003°W

Ramsar Wetland
- Designated: 30 May 1990
- Reference no.: 472

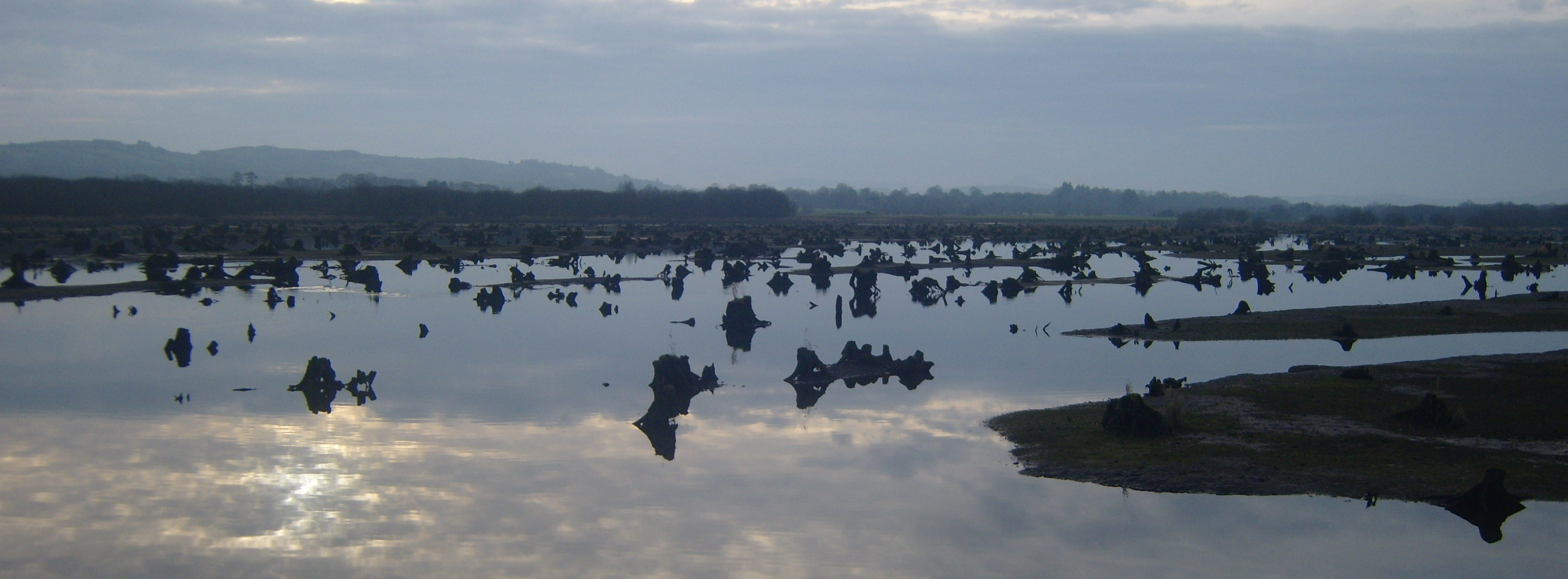
Wider view

The Gearagh (Irish: An Gaorthadh) is a submerged glacial woodland and nature reserve two kilometres southwest of Macroom, County Cork, in Kilmichael parish, Ireland. It is located at the point where the River Lee descends from the mountains and widens at an alluvial plain, and stretches for roughly five kilometres, bounded by the townlands of Toonsbridge, Illaunmore and Anahala.

It was until recently densely populated with ancient oak trees and the last surviving full oak forest in western Europe. Its Irish name is An Gaorthadh (meaning "the wooded river-valley" or "the river-bed"). Author Seamus O'Donoghue provides another Irish name, An Gaoire, derived from the Irish word Gaorthadh. The area was flooded in 1954 to facilitate the building of two hydro-electric dams in Carrigadrohid and Inniscarra, which provide electricity for the nearby city of Cork. The area is now part of the plants' upper reservoir. The development required the flooding of the region; consequently, hundreds of trees were felled and many people were relocated. Many of the trees were centuries old and had grown since the medieval period. Today only their stumps survive, in flood land, giving the area a ghostly and almost lunar appearance.

Today it comprises wide but shallow water enclosing a series of small islands separated by anastomosing, mostly flat, river streams. It remains an area of outstanding natural beauty, with a diverse ecological system and wide variety of plants, birds and fish, including freshwater pearl mussel, Atlantic salmon, whooper swans, kingfishers and otters.

It is designated a wetland of international importance under the Ramsar Convention, and also enjoys international protection as an EU Special Area of Conservation of 558 ha. Part of the SAC is designated a nature reserve under the Irish Wildlife Act and the reservoir is a wildfowl sanctuary.

== History ==
The area is thought to have been wooded since the mid-Holocene at the end of the last Ice Age, around 8,000 BC. It is Ireland's last primeval river forest, and is situated at the point where the River Lee emerges from the hills to broaden on alluvial ground. Because of its fragmented, secluded and maze like structure, it was inaccessible to local Gardaí, and was traditionally a haven for poitín makers; the area was until recently renowned for its high quality, potent brand.

Until the 1950s, it extended as far as the Lee Bridge and consisted of a large number of oak and ash trees. It was gutted in 1954 during the construction of the Lee Valley hydro-electric plant, which necessitated extensive tree-felling and flooding. The trees, many of which were over many centuries old, were cut down and residents were relocated. Now submerged houses are visible from the area around Two Mile Bridge. The scheme resulted in the loss of sixty percent of the former oak woodland.

Local folklore associates the area with the Meascan Maraiocht, mischievous spirits that would deliberately confuse and lead visitors astray.

== Wildlife and conservation ==
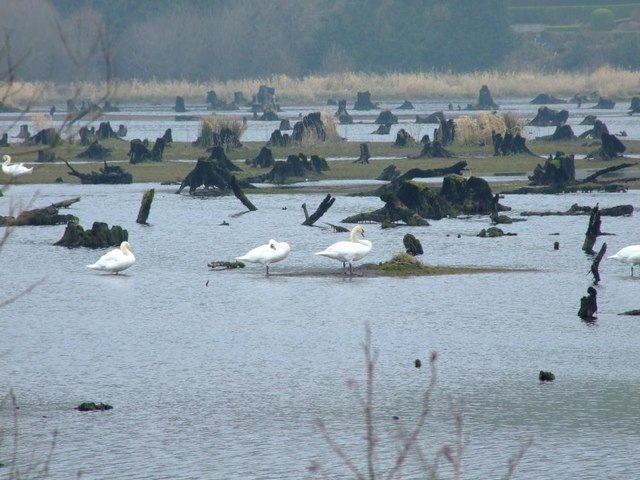
Swans resting on islands and tree stumps

The Gearagh is primarily of interest and importance due to its rich and rare diversity of wildlife, and it represents the only extant extensive alluvial woodland in Western Europe. It hosts numerous rare plant species including marsh marigold, meadowsweet and nightshade, and 62 species of moss and liverwort. While oak and ash trees once pre-dominated, today there are a number of willow and alder trees on the higher islands and inlets. It hosts a large diversity of birds and wildfowl and attracts both summer and winter migrants. Examples include mallards, wigeon, Greylag geese, grey herons and coots. It also hosts Atlantic salmon and the near extinct freshwater pearl mussel. The area is protected under the international Ramsar Convention.

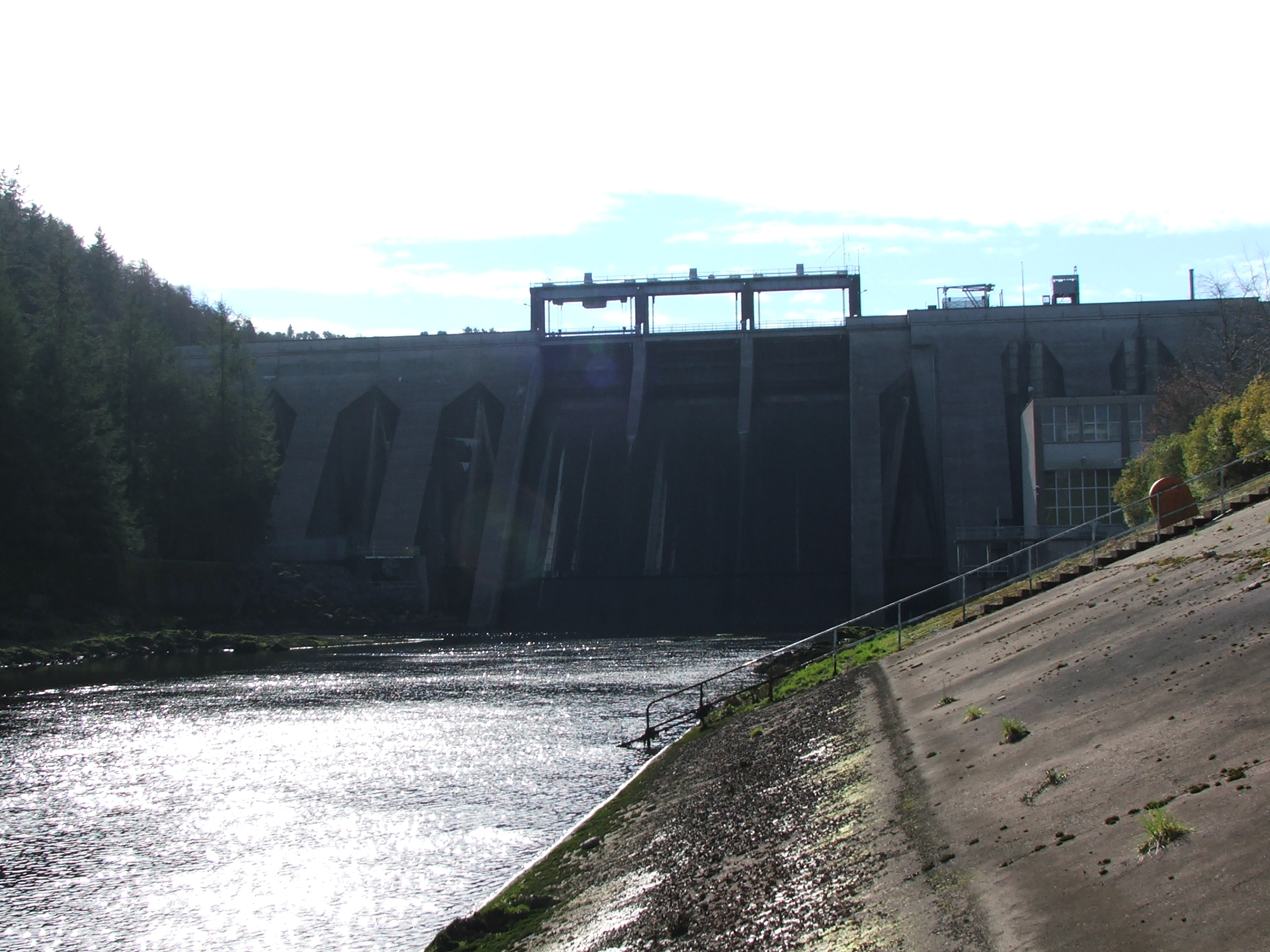
Inniscarra Dam

The area has been the focus of significant heritage and conservation efforts, especially by environmental biologist and conservationist Kevin Corcoran. He observed that before the dam was built "this was the last pure stand of ancient riverine forest that had survived intact since the last ice age. This was just one of four such systems on the whole planet." Describing the Gearagh as of "immense" importance, Corcoran observed in a later interview how it is "hard to imagine what the area looked like before being flooded – a vast inland delta of inter-connecting, many branched streams that encircled a maze of small and inaccessible islands, covered in oak forest. It was protected from the ravages of humanity by its swampy terrain, deep swirling streams and treacherous banks of soft mud with holes big enough to swallow a horse."

According to filmmaker Declan O’Mahony, "If the water level was permanently dropped, the Gearagh would grow back and has the full potential to become a world heritage site on a par with Newgrange, the Giant’s Causeway and The Burren". (The Burren is not actually a World Heritage Site, although it has been put forward as a candidate.).

The Gearagh was declared a statutory nature reserve in 1987, under the protection of the Wildlife Act, but owned by the ESB.

== Gallery ==
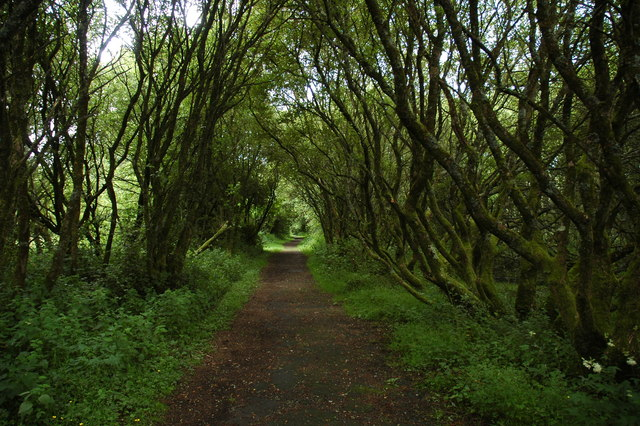
The main pathway; the remnants of the old Port road, which cross mid way along the length of the Gearagh, and consists of a series of bridges.

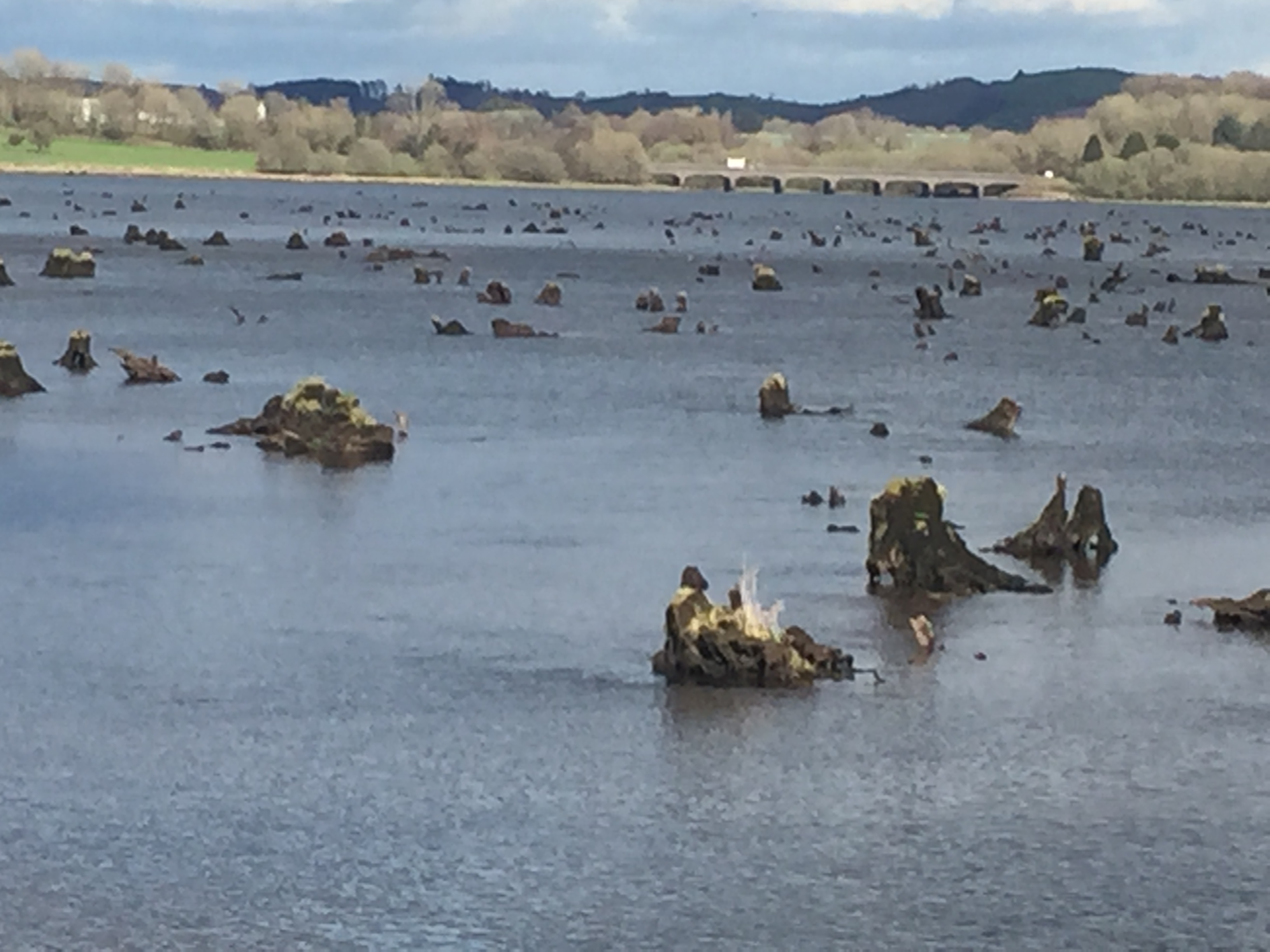
Submerged oak tree stumps, high water

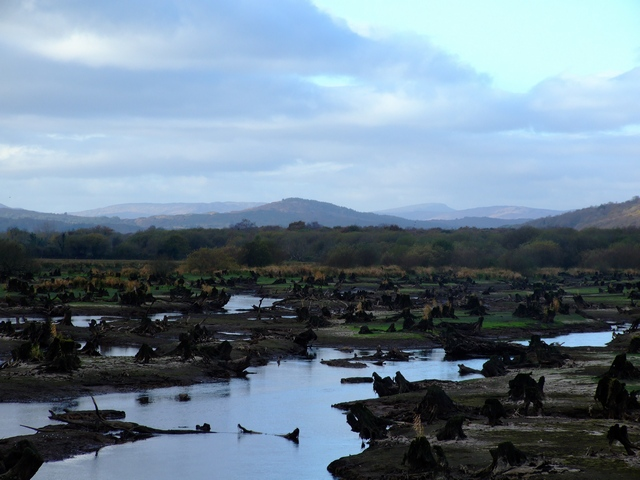
At low water level

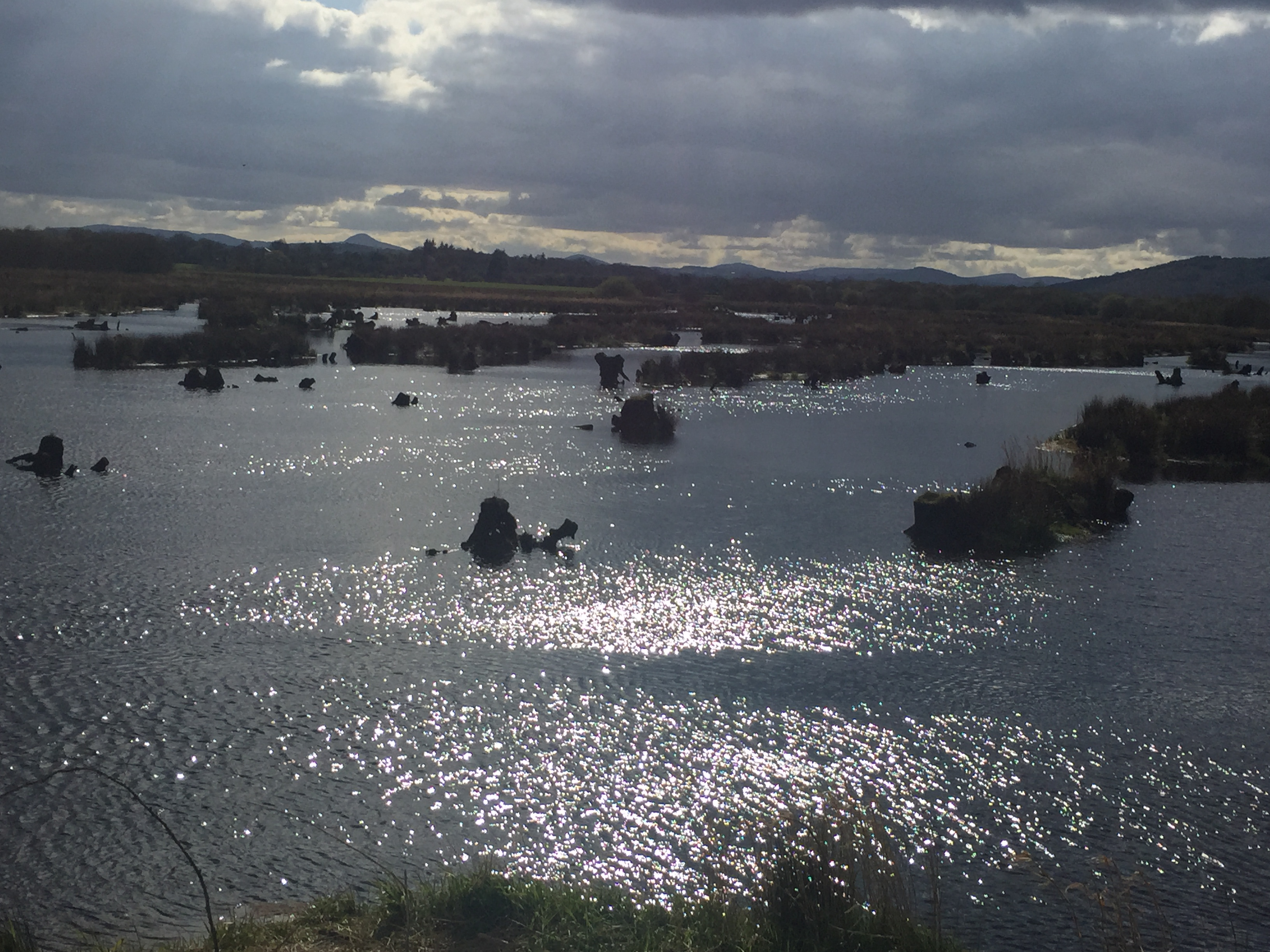
Inlets and islands

== Sources ==
- Brown, A.G. lluvial Geoarchaeology: Floodplain Archaeology and Environmental Change. Cambridge University Press, 2008. ISBN 978-0-5215-6820-3
- Corcoran, Kevin. Saving Eden: The Gearagh and Irish Nature. Cork: The Gearagh Press, 2021. ISBN 978-1-78846-194-8
- Monk, Michael. Early Medieval Munster: Archaeology, History and Society. Cork: Cork University Press, 1998. ISBN 978-1-8591-8107-2
- O'Donoghue, Seamus. The Flooding of the Lee Valley: The Lee Hydro-electric Scheme. Cork: Tower Books, 1996. ISBN 0-9025-6826-4
- Wood, Paul. Hydroecology and Ecohydrology: Past, Present and Future. Wiley & sons, 2007. ISBN 978-0-4700-1017-4
