= Curraheen River =

River in County Cork, Ireland

Coordinates: 51.86188°N 8.628201°W

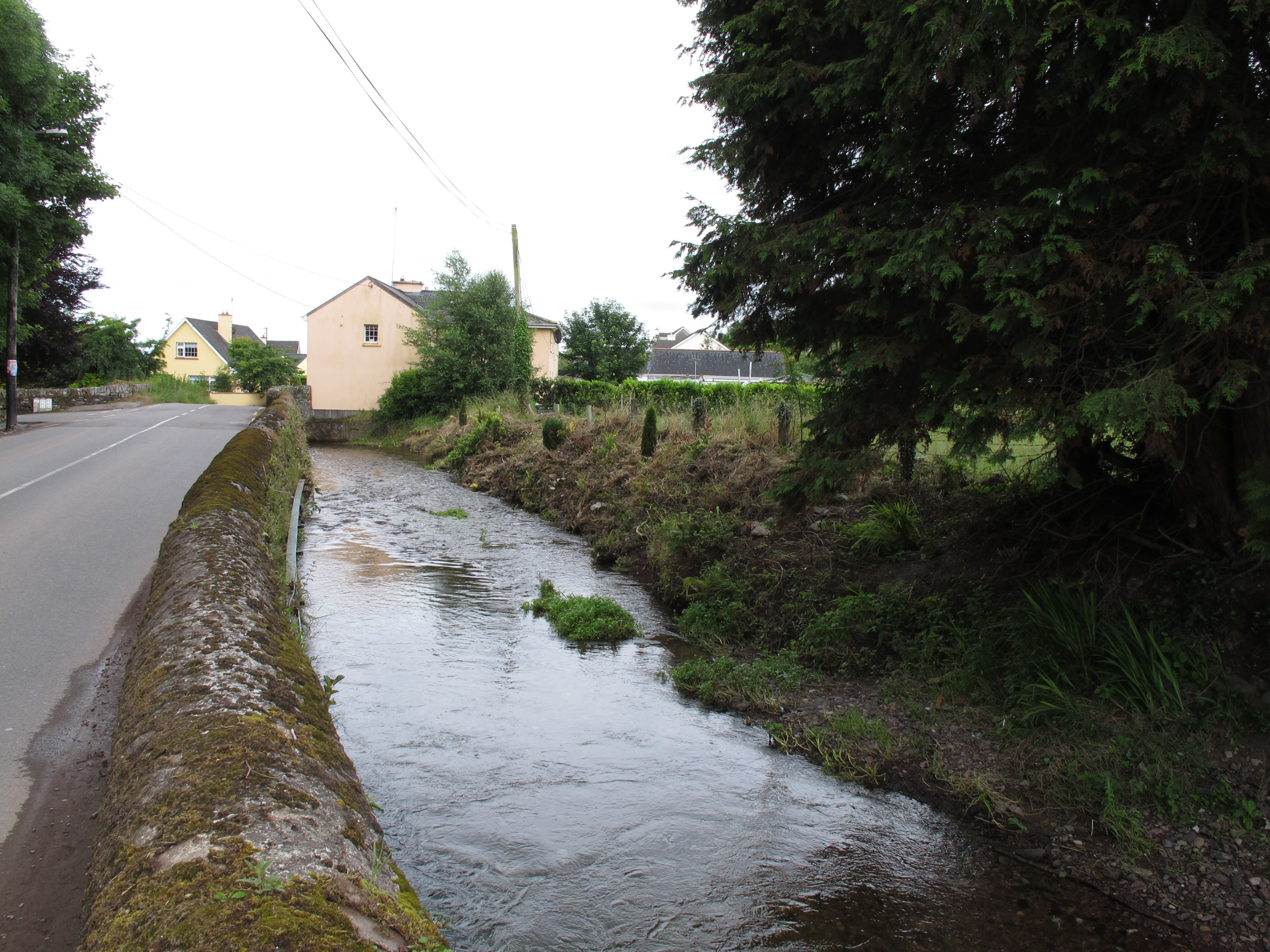
- The Curraheen River, passing through Curraheen townland, in County Cork
- Native name: An tSabhrainn (Irish)

Physical characteristics
- Source
  - location: Grange Hill
- Mouth: River Lee
  - location: Cork City

Basin features
- River system: River Lee
- Tributaries
  - left: Maglin River

The Curraheen River (Irish: An tSabhrainn; also spelled Curragheen) is a river in County Cork and Cork City, Ireland, a tributary of the River Lee.

== Name ==
The river's name references the Curraheen townland (Inniskenny civil parish). In the Irish language, the river bears the name An tSabhrainn, from the Proto-Celtic *Sabrinā, the same name as the Hafren and the River Severn. It is named, as Sabraind, in the 12th century poem Aislinge Meic Con Glinne, although some scholars translate this as "River Lee."

== Course ==
The Curraheen River forms at the confluence of several rivulets in the Ballincollig–Curraheen area. It flows north and then east, under the N22 and N40 roads, flowing past Curraheen Park Greyhound Stadium. In Bishopstown it turns northwards, flowing to the west of Cork IT's campus. It flows under the Model Farm Road (R608) and then bends eastwards, where there is a river walk. The Curraheen River then flows under the R608 at Victoria Cross and drains into the River Lee to the southwest of Cork City.

== Wildlife ==
Fish species include brown trout, Atlantic salmon, European river lamprey and European brook lamprey.

There was a major fish kill of brown trout on the Curraheen River in 2016, due to a sewage leak.

An invasive American rodent, the coypu, has been spotted on the Curraheen River from 2016 onward.

== See also ==
- Rivers of Ireland
