= R608 road (Ireland) =

Road in Ireland

Coordinates: 51.889097°N 8.498772°W

R608 road
- Bóthar R608
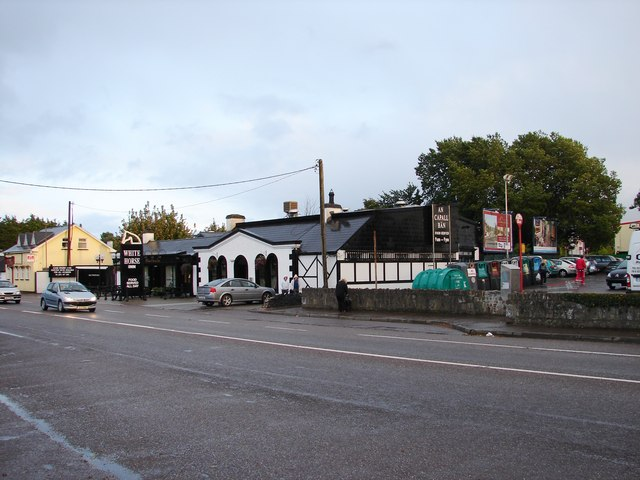
- R608 passing the White Horse, Ballincollig

Route information
- Length: 12.2 km (7.6 mi)

Major junctions
- From: N22 Barnagore
- N22 Ballincollig; Crosses Curraheen River; R641 Wilton Road; R849 Glasheen Road; R851 Evergreen Street
- To: N22 Washington Street

Location
- Country: Ireland

Highway system
- Roads in Ireland; Motorways; Primary; Secondary; Regional

The R608 road is a regional road in Ireland, located in Cork City. It intersects the N22 three times and goes from the city centre to Ballincollig via Wilton and Bishopstown.
