= Máire Bhuí Ní Laoghaire =

Irish poet

Máire Bhuí Ní Laoghaire (1774–c.1848) was an Irish poet from County Cork, Ireland. Ní Laoghaire's works were composed in the Irish language and, delivered as part of an oral tradition, covered cultural and political topics of early 19th century Ireland.

== Early life and family ==
Ní Laoghaire was born in Túirín na nÉan in Uibh Laoghaire (Iveleary), near Ballingeary, County Cork. She was from a family of five sons and three daughters who lived on her father's fifty acre farm. In 1792, she married Séamus de Búrca (Burke), a Skibbereen horsetrader. The couple had eight children, and by 1821 they had settled on a holding they purchased near Céim an Fhia/Keimaneigh. While they were known for their generosity, their fortunes had declined by 1847 and they were unable to pay rent increases applied by their landlord. At least two of their sons were arrested for membership of a secret agrarian organisation, and mounting debts led to their eviction. Ní Laoghaire died soon afterwards and was buried in Inchigeelagh.

== Works ==
Ní Laoghaire was illiterate in both English and Irish, and learned through the oral tradition in the ceilidh houses. Her poems sometimes allude to classical mythology, as is often seen in the Munster Irish oral poetry of the era. Her songs and poems survived via the oral tradition of the area, as did compositions by her contemporaries such as Antoine Ó Raifteirí.

Her best-known composition is Cath Chéim an Fhia (The Battle of Keimaneigh), which provides an account of a fight between the local yeoman militia and the Whiteboys in 1822. A number of Ní Laoghaire's sons were involved in the movement to defend tenant-farmer land-rights, and had been involved in the fight.

In the 1930s, Father Donagh O'Donoghue compiled and published an Irish-language book of O'Leary's poetry titled "Filiocht Mhaire Bhuidhe Ni Laoghaire". It was first published in 1931, with a second printing in 1933 and finally in 1950. A later English translation, titled "The Poetry of Maura Bwee O'Leary", was published with input from Fr. Sean Sweeney of the Society of African Missions and Fr. Richard P. Burke of the College of the Holy Cross, Worcester, Massachusetts. A further book, Songs of An Irish Poet: The Mary O'Leary Story, was published by Brian Brennan in 2007.
