= Lough Allua =

Lake in County Cork, Ireland

- Locha Lua (Irish)
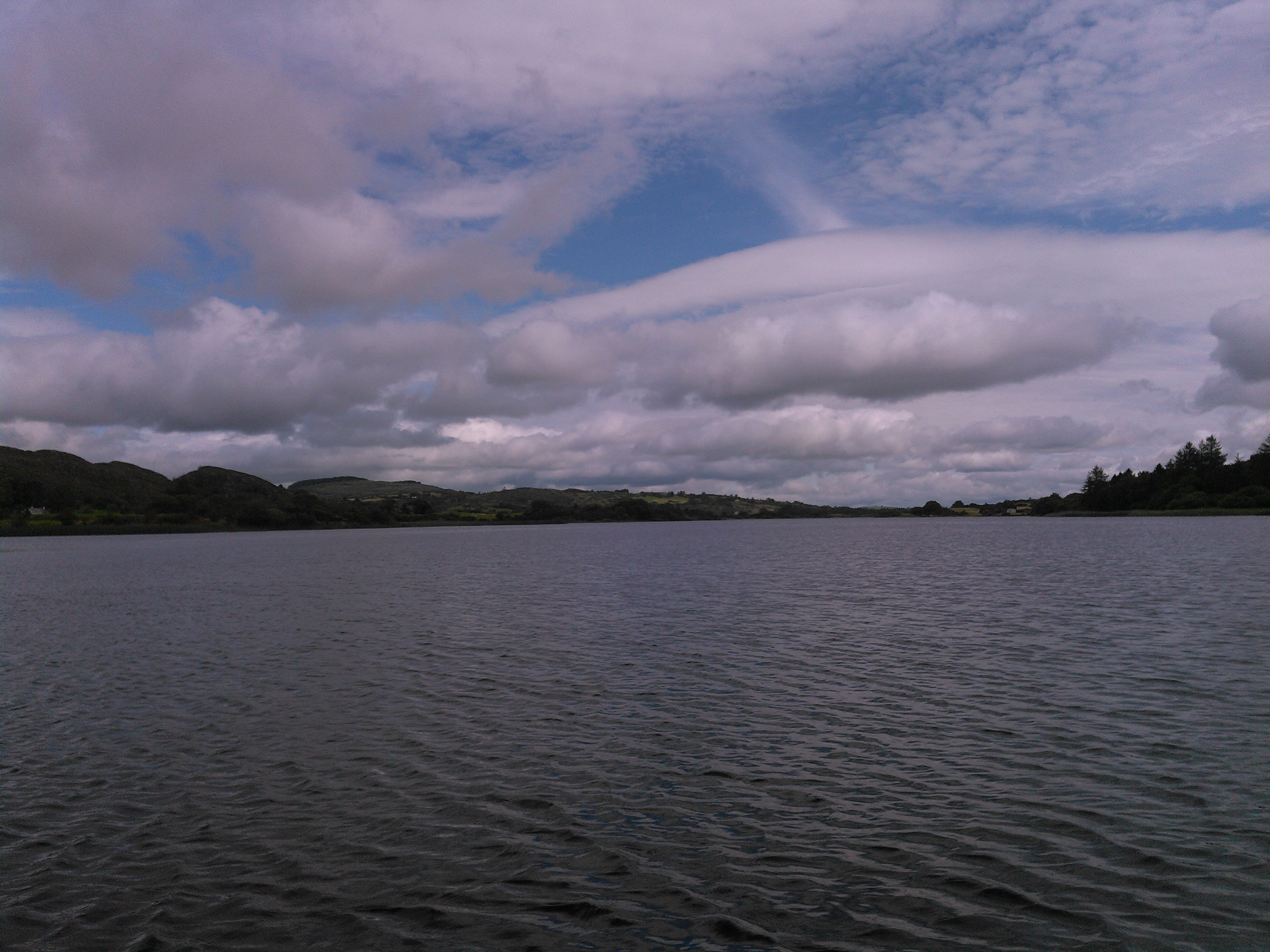

- Location within Ireland
- Location: County Cork
- Coordinates: 51.836622°N 9.181010°W
- Primary inflows: River Lee
- Primary outflows: River Lee
- Basin countries: Ireland
- Surface area: 1.36 km^{2} (0.53 sq mi)
- Average depth: 4 m (13 ft)
- Max. depth: 47.2 m (155 ft)
- Surface elevation: 168 m (551 ft)

Lough Allua (Irish: Locha Lua) is a freshwater lake in County Cork with an area of 1.36 km² located beside Inchigeelagh and forms part of the River Lee.

== Wildlife ==
Lough Allua is a pike, salmon, Arctic char and trout fishery.
