= Inniscarra =

Civil parish in County Cork, Ireland

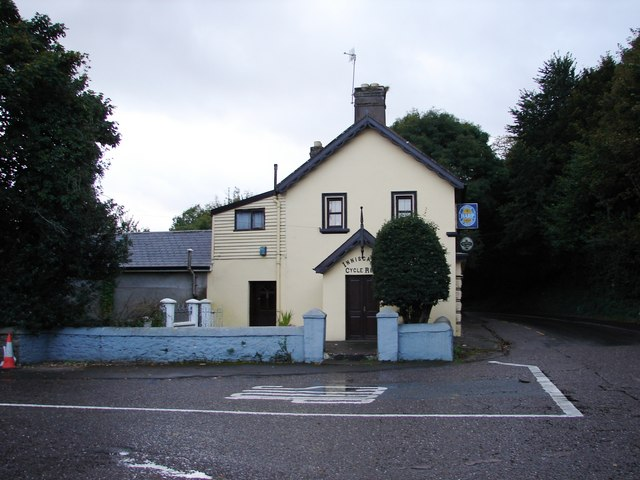
"Inniscarra Cycle Rest"

Inniscarra, or Inishcarra (Irish: Inis Cara), is a civil parish in the barony of Muskerry East, County Cork, Ireland. It is located about 15km west of Cork city. The local GAA club is Inniscarra GAA and Dripsey GAA. Inniscarra is located on the north side of the River Lee. Inniscarra Dam is one of the two Hydro-Electric Dams on the River Lee.

== People ==
- Rena Buckley; former captain of both the Cork senior ladies' football team and the Cork senior camogie team.
- John Ryan, Irish and Munster rugby player is from Berrings, a townland in Inniscarra
