= Carrigadrohid hydroelectric power station =

Dam in County Cork, Ireland

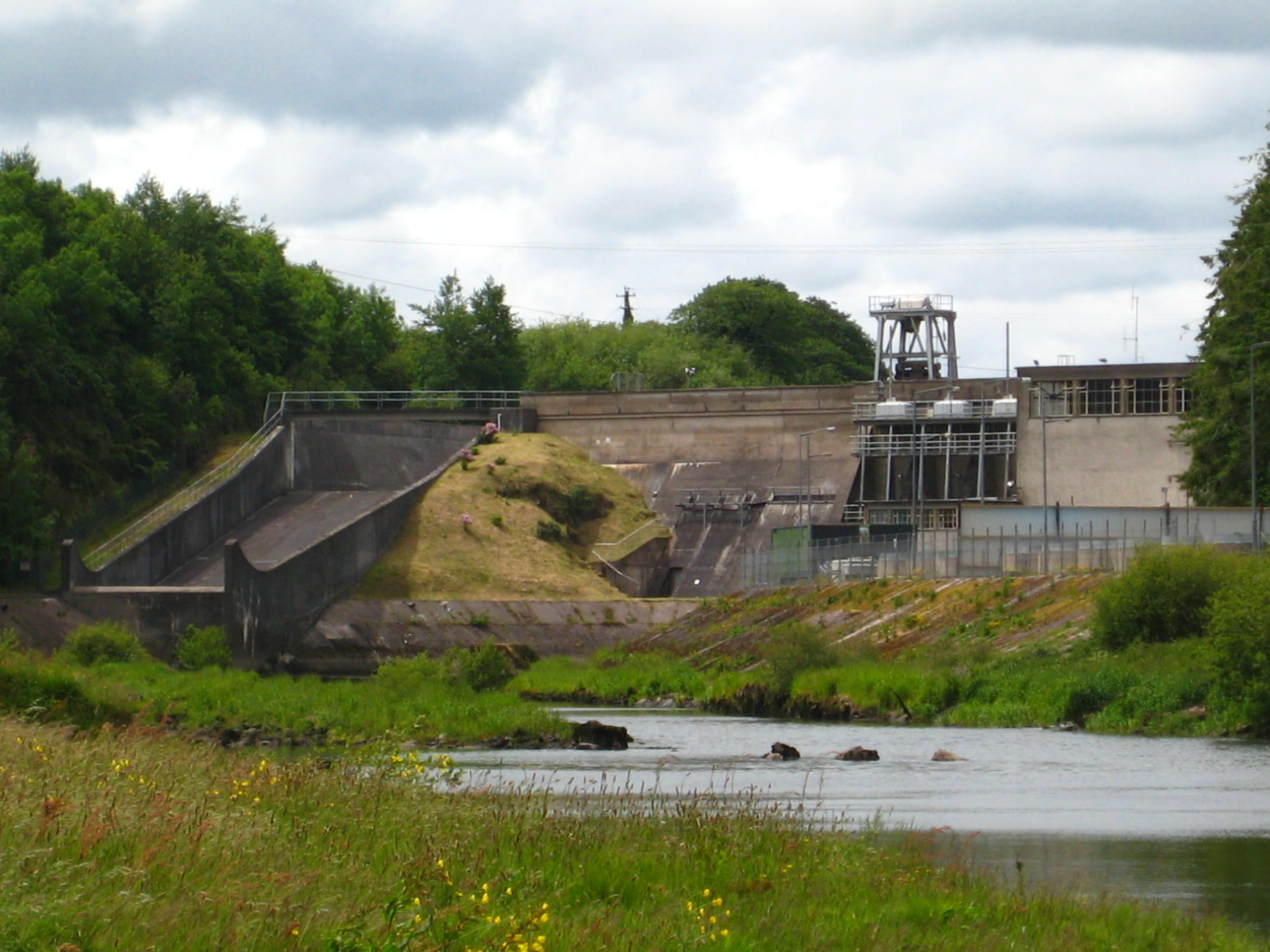

- Location within Ireland
- Country: Ireland
- Location: County Cork
- Coordinates: 51.897175°N 8.86382°W
- Purpose: Power
- Status: Operational
- Construction began: 1952 (74 years ago)
- Opening date: 1957 (69 years ago)
- Owner: ESB Group

Dam and spillways
- Type of dam: Gravity dam
- Impounds: River Lee
- Height: 22 m (72 ft)
- Length: 130 m (427 ft)
- Spillways: 3

Reservoir
- Creates: Carrigadrohid Lake
- Catchment area: 616 km^{2} (238 mi^{2})
- Surface area: 9 km^{2} (3.5 mi^{2})

Power Station
- Commission date: 1957 (69 years ago)
- Type: Conventional
- Turbines: 1 x 8 MW Kaplan-type
- Installed capacity: 8 MW
- Annual generation: 22 GWh (79 TJ)

Carrigadrohid hydroelectric power station is a hydroelectric plant located on the River Lee in County Cork, Ireland. It is owned and operated by the ESB Group. The dam is 130 m (427 ft) long and has a single 8 MW (11,000 hp) Kaplan turbine which produces an average of 22 GWh (79 TJ) each year. Built between 1952 and 1957. the construction of Carrigadrohid required the destruction of over half of the Gearagh, an ancient alluvial forest, and initially harmed local wildlife. However, subsequently the area has seen the growth of an ecosystem with kingfishers, otters, salmon and swans, which has been designated European Union Special Area of Conservation.

== Construction ==
The Carrigadrohid hydroelectric plant, along with its sister plant constructed 20 kilometres (12 miles) downstream on the River Lee at Inniscarra, formed the fourth major hydroelectric development undertaken by ESB. Construction of the reinforced concrete gravity dam started in 1952 and was complete in 1957. The dam is 130 m (427 ft) long and 22 m (72 ft) high, and operates with an average head of 13 m (43 ft). It is constructed of nine blocks, each between 9.1 and 18.6 metres (30 and 61 feet) in length, and is fitted with three ground sluices and a spillway weir.

== Generating capacity ==
The plant consists of a single Kaplan turbine rated at 8 MW (11,000 hp) manufactured by Voith. It spins at 167 r.p.m. and feeds a single 11,500 kVA Siemens generator running at 10.5 kV. The average output for the station is 22 GWh (79 TJ) a year.

== Impact on flooding ==
According to Cawley et al, the construction of this dam and the one at Inniscarra "have reduced significantly the extent and frequency of flooding along the Lee valley into Cork City". Prior to the construction, there were a number of fatal floodings in the city of Cork, including one on 2 November 1853 that killed 12 people.

== Impact on wildlife ==
As part of the construction of the reservoir to power the plant, 60% of the Gearagh, an ancient alluvial forest, was flooded. The stocks of animals like trout, otters, eels and freshwater pearl mussels were also negatively impacted by the construction. Many species, including freshwater pearl mussels, Atlantic salmon, whooper swans, common kingfishers and Eurasian otters, can still be seen in the area and the reservoir has been designated a European Union Special Area of Conservation. There is a salmon hatchery where over a million smolts are reared every year, of which over 100,000 are released into the river.
