= Inniscarra Dam =

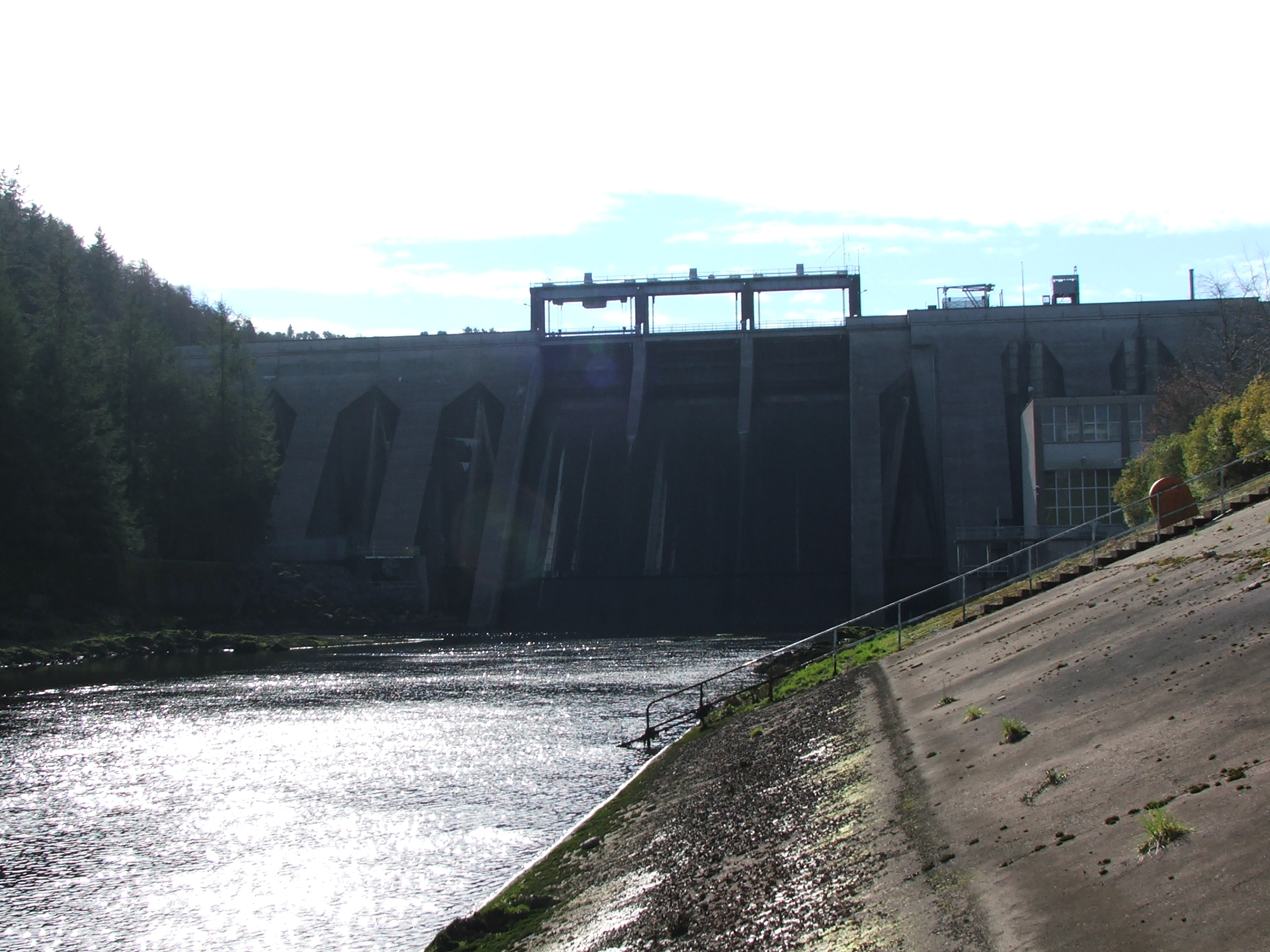

- Location within Ireland
- Country: Ireland
- Location: County Cork
- Coordinates: 51°54′00″N 8°39′43″W
- Purpose: Power
- Status: Operational
- Construction began: February 1953 (73 years ago)
- Opening date: 1957 (69 years ago)
- Construction cost: £4.5 million.

Dam and spillways
- Type of dam: Buttress
- Impounds: River Lee
- Height: 45 m (148 ft)
- Length: 247 m (810 ft)
- Spillways: 3
- Spillway length: 12 metres (39 ft)

Reservoir
- Creates: Inniscarra Lake

Power Station
- Commission date: 1957 (69 years ago)
- Turbines: 1 x 15 MW; 1 x 4 MW Kaplan-type
- Installed capacity: 19 MW

Inniscarra Dam is a buttress dam located on the River Lee in the civil parish of Inniscarra in County Cork, Ireland. Construction of the dam started in February 1953 and resulted in the formation of the Inniscarra Reservoir. It was built at an original cost of £4.5 million.

The dam is owned and operated by the ESB Group and has a generation capacity of 19 MW via its twin vertical-shaft Kaplan turbine generators built by Voith. Power is generated at 10.5 kV, and subsequently stepped up to 38kV and 100kV for long-distance transmission.

The dam over-flooded in November 2009 and caused around 100 million euros worth of damage to the city, with University College Cork having claimed that the flood damaged 20 million euros worth of its property.

== See also ==
- Carrigadrohid hydroelectric power station
