= River Lee =

River crossing Cork (county and city), Ireland

Coordinates: 51°53′55″N 8°32′21″W

- The Gearagh, a submerged woodland situated on the Lee near Macroom

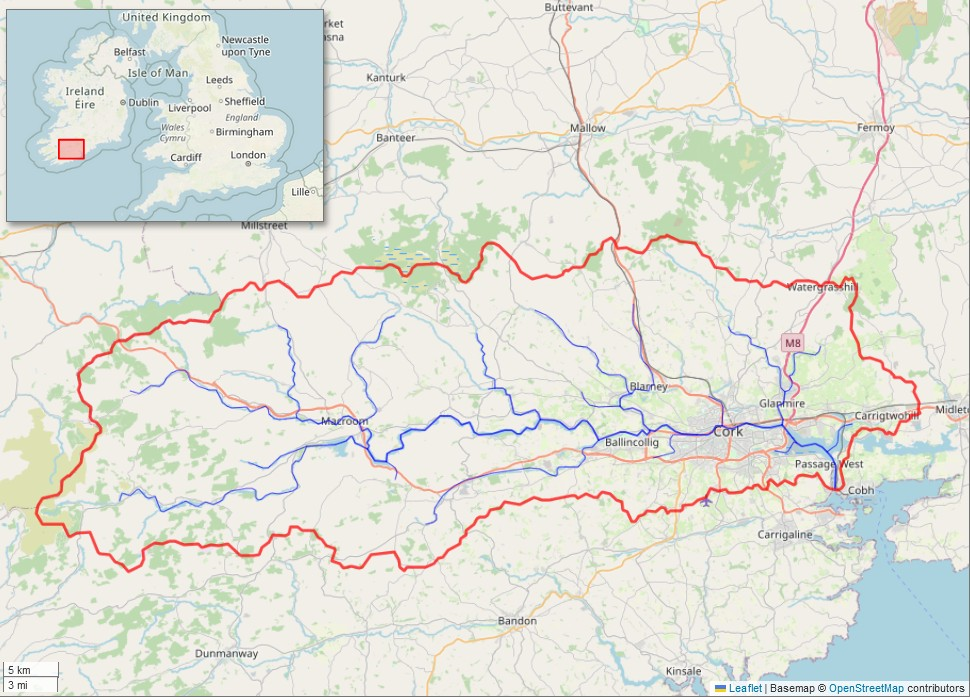
- Map of the River Lee drainage basin
- Native name: An Laoi (Irish)

Physical characteristics
- Source
  - location: Shehy Mountains near Gougane Barra
- Mouth
  - location: Celtic Sea at Cork Harbour mouth
- Length: 90 km (56 mi)
- Basin size: 1,253.5 km^{2} (484.0 sq mi)
- Discharge
  - average: 40.4 m^{3}/s (1,430 cu ft/s)

Basin features
- Tributaries
  - right: Curraheen River

The River Lee (Irish: An Laoi) is a river in Ireland. It rises in the Shehy Mountains on the western border of County Cork and flows eastwards through Cork city, where it splits in two for a short distance, creating an island on which Cork's city centre is built, then passes through Cork Harbour on the south coast, one of the largest natural harbours in the world, to empty into the Celtic Sea. The catchment area of the River Lee is 1,253 km^{2}. The long-term average flow rate of the River Lee is 40.4 cubic metres per second (m^{3}/s).

A hydro-electric scheme was built on the river, upstream from Cork City, and this part of the river now contains the Carrigadrohid and Inniscarra reservoirs. The river is crossed by 42 bridges, 29 of which are in Cork City, and one tunnel. The river also provides an 8-kilometre (5.0 mi) stretch of salmon fishing.

== Name ==
Ptolemy's Geography (2nd century AD) described a river called Δαβρωνα (Dabrona) or Λαβρωνα (Labrona), which is sometimes considered to refer to the River Lee. Though unconfirmed, the river's Irish name, Laoi, may derive from Corca Luighe, which in turn derives from 'Luighe', the son of a quasi-mythical Milesian noble.

There is also the Λουρ (Lour), a separate river which passes through Tralee.

== Description ==
=== Sources ===
The River Lee has its source in the Shehy Mountains near Gougane Barra, where there is a forest park, chapel, hotel, and shop.

=== Course ===
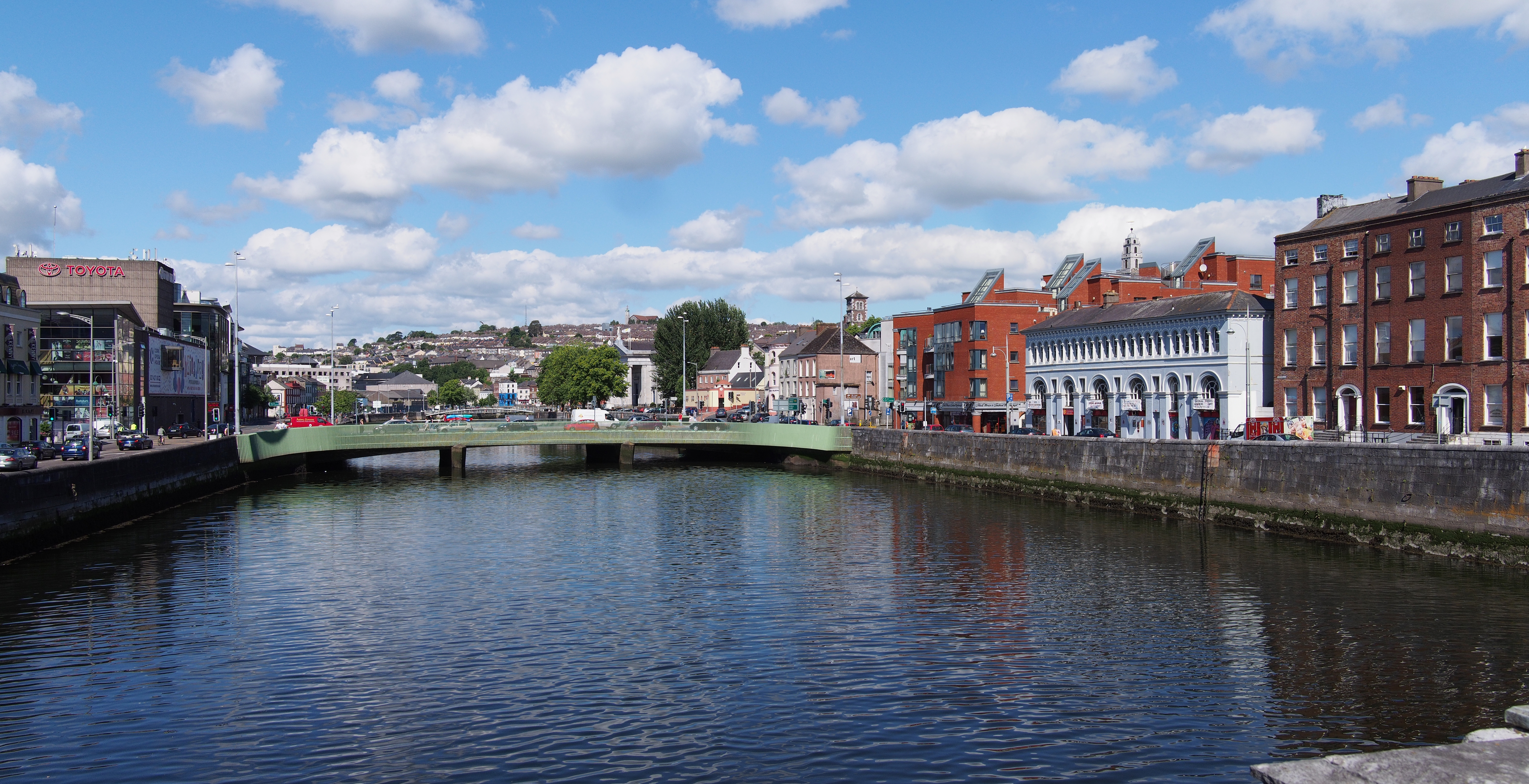
River Lee north channel

The Lee flows from the lake of Gougane Barra as a fast-paced torrent, but by the town of Ballingeary it eases and flows into Lough Allua. Departing the lough, running east, it again becomes a rapid flow before running into The Gearagh, and Carrigadrohid feeder reservoirs, and then into the large Inniscarra reservoir created by Inniscarra Dam. Moving on, it flows down from the dam, in normal conditions a gentle river until it comes to Ballincollig Weir in Ballincollig Park; here it is dangerous to swimmers when in high water. The Lee then flows into the city under Inniscarra Bridge and flows parallel to the Carrigrohane road. Along this section gauges monitor the water levels from the Inniscarra Dam. The river flows over the Lee weir and then is split into the north and south channels at a sluice (it historically occupied the city area as a maze of channels). This area is popular for recreation, kayaking and fishing. The two channels join again at the Cork docks and enter the extensive estuary and harbour, south of Glanmire, passing either side of Great Island (Cobh lies on the south coast) to fill the outer harbour, and reaching the open sea between Whitegate and Crosshaven.

=== Tributaries ===
==== Upper course (above Inchigeela) ====
High tributaries include the Owenagariff, the Bunsheelin, the Paudeen and the Garrifowa.

==== Middle course (to the Dripsey) ====
Tributaries joining below Lough Allua and Inchigeela include the River Toon, the extensive Sullane River system, from near Ballyvourney (tributaries include the Douglas, Finnow, Foherish and Laney or Laine Rivers) via Macroom, the smaller Buinea and Glashagariff Rivers, and the River Dripsey and its tributaries the Rylane and the Delaghinagh.

==== Near Cork city ====
Below the last ESB dam, tributaries joining include the River Bride from Slievowen via Crookstown, Killumney and Ovens, and the River Shournagh (formed from the Blarney and Martin Rivers, and the Owennagearagh River; historically may have been the Awbeg River).

==== City area ====
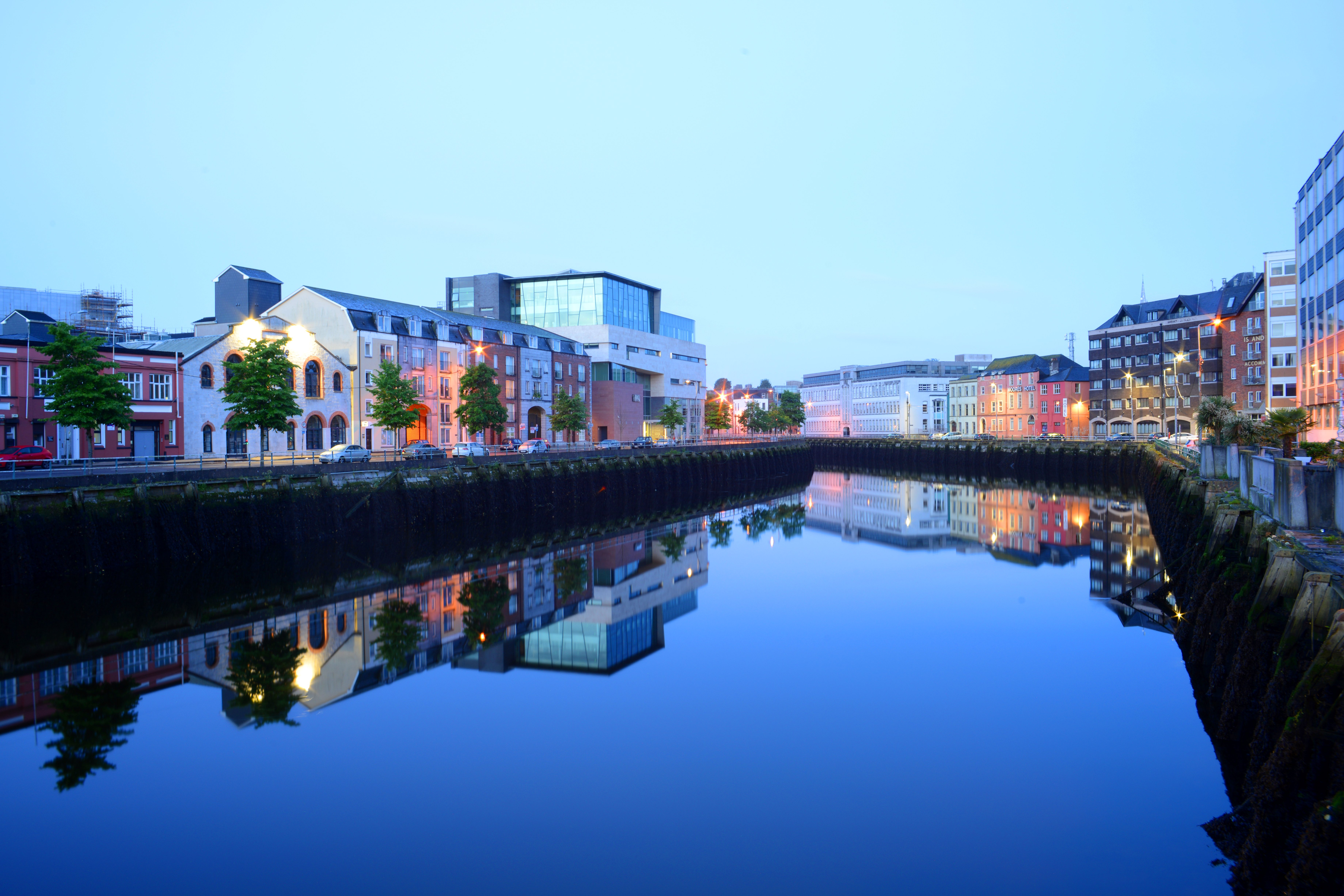
River Lee south channel

City area tributaries include the combined Maglin (from Ballincollig) and Curraheen (occasionally Curragheen) Rivers, capturing the Glasheen river also and joining at the western end of the UCC complex, and the Kiln River (sometimes Bride River) which joins by the Christy Ring Bridge in the city centre, a little west of St. Patrick's Bridge (formed in turn from a Bride River and the Kilnap or Glennamought River, later joined by the Glen River).

==== Tidal area ====
Estuarine tributaries include the Glashaboy River, passing Glanmire (main tributaries the Black Brook, Cloghnageshee River and Butterstown River), the Douglas or Tramore River (joined by the Trabeg River as it flows into the Douglas Channel, its estuary) which drains parts of the southern city, Owennacurra River (joined by the Dungurney River at Midleton), and the Owenaboy River almost at the final mouth of the outer Lee estuary (the Liberty Stream joins this river, with significant flows from Cork Airport).

== Recreation ==
Recreation activities on the Lee include sailing, swimming, kayaking, water skiing. Several rowing clubs are based on the Lee including the Lee Rowing Club, Shandon Boat Club, and Cork Boat Club. Naomhoga Chorcaí is also based on the Marina, and is Ireland's largest Currach (traditional canvas fishing boat) rowing club. Angling is also common from the banks of the Lee Fields.

== Flooding ==
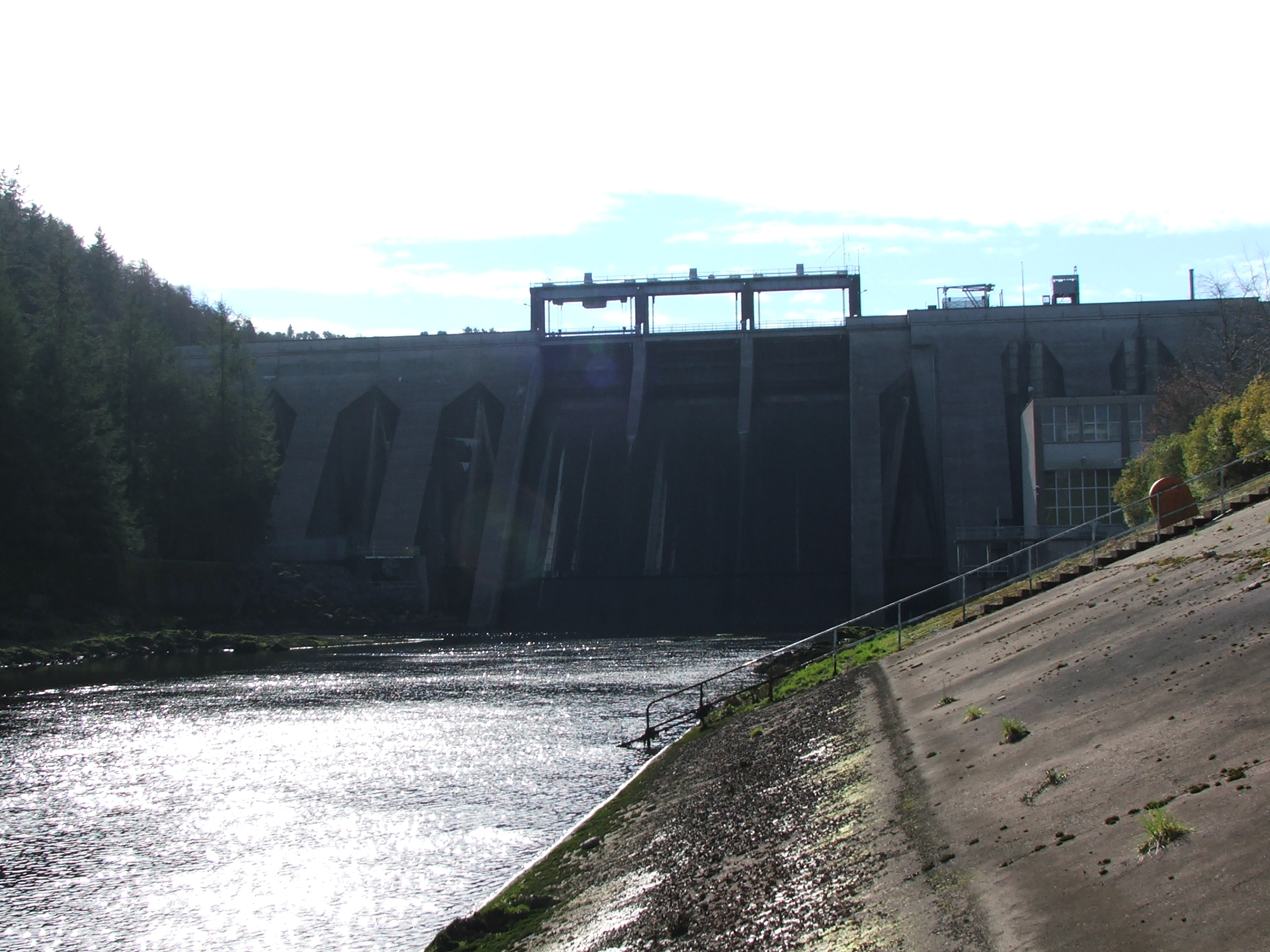
In 2009, water was released in large quantities from the Inniscarra Dam, causing flood damage in Cork City

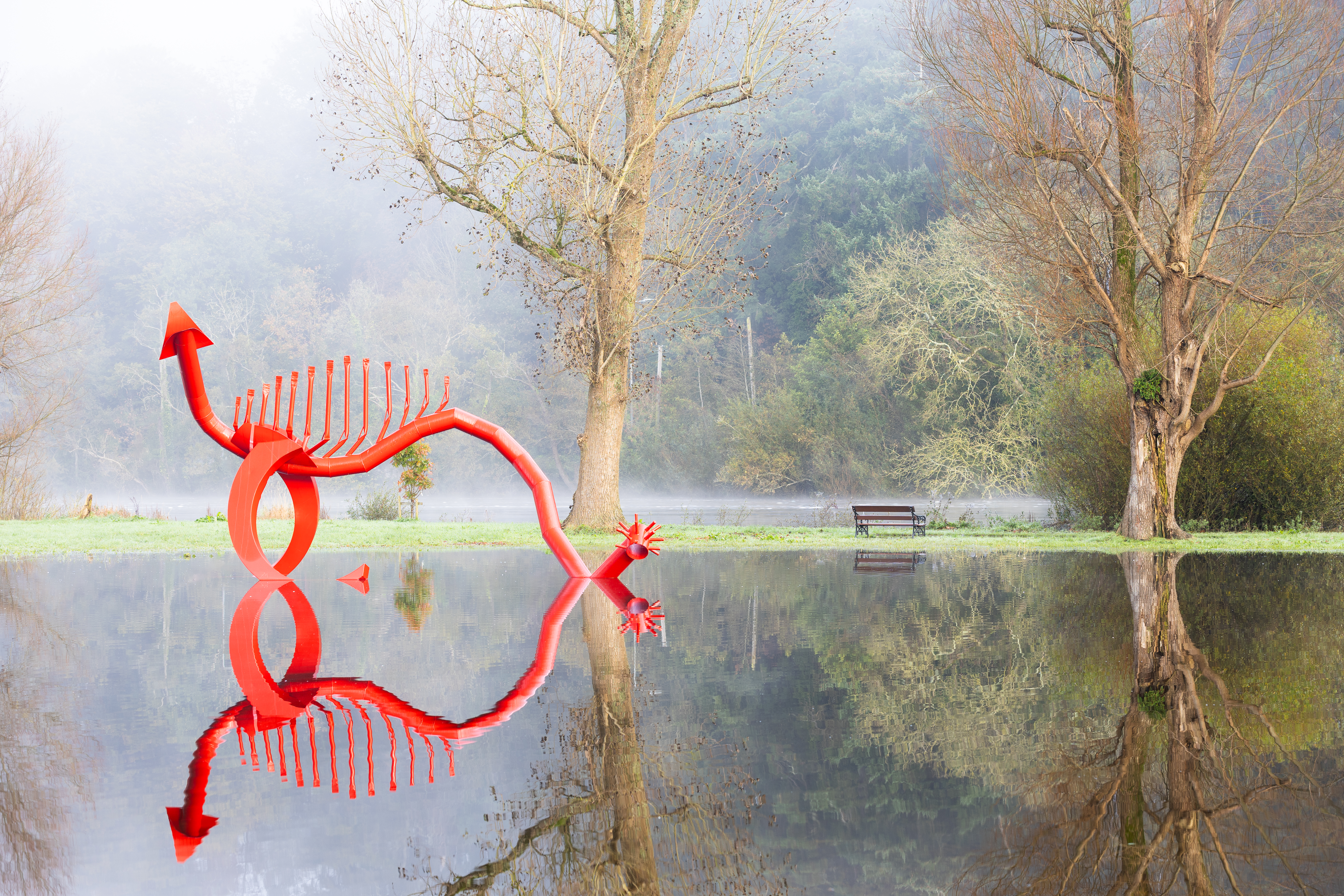
Red Dragon sculpture in Lee Fields which are frequently flooded

Tidal considerations, combined with low-lying urban developments, and later dam management contribute to repeated flooding events on the Lee. Specific streets in Cork city centre have been affected by floods more than 100 times since the mid-19th century.

=== 2009 flooding ===
In late 2009 the river flooded, causing some of the most significant damage in Cork city for a number of centuries. The Lee Water Station was forced to shut down after being submerged under six metres of water, and resulted in 40% of Cork City (50,000 people) being without running water for over a week. Lower-lying parts of the University College Cork campus were also flooded extensively, resulting in lectures being cancelled throughout the week. There was severe damage to the university's then newly built IT building, the Western Gateway Building, situated next to the river on a known floodplain, where, for example, a 300-seat auditorium was flooded to near ceiling height. To prevent issues upstream, the ESB made a controversial decision to release water from the Inniscarra hydro-electric dam. This released 535 tonnes of water per second into the already flooded river, raising the flood to 1.5 metres in parts of the city centre. The ESB insisted this was an essential move, and if water had not been released, the flooding would have been much worse.

== See also ==
- The Gearagh
