= Moycarkey (electoral division) =

Electoral division in Tipperary, Ireland

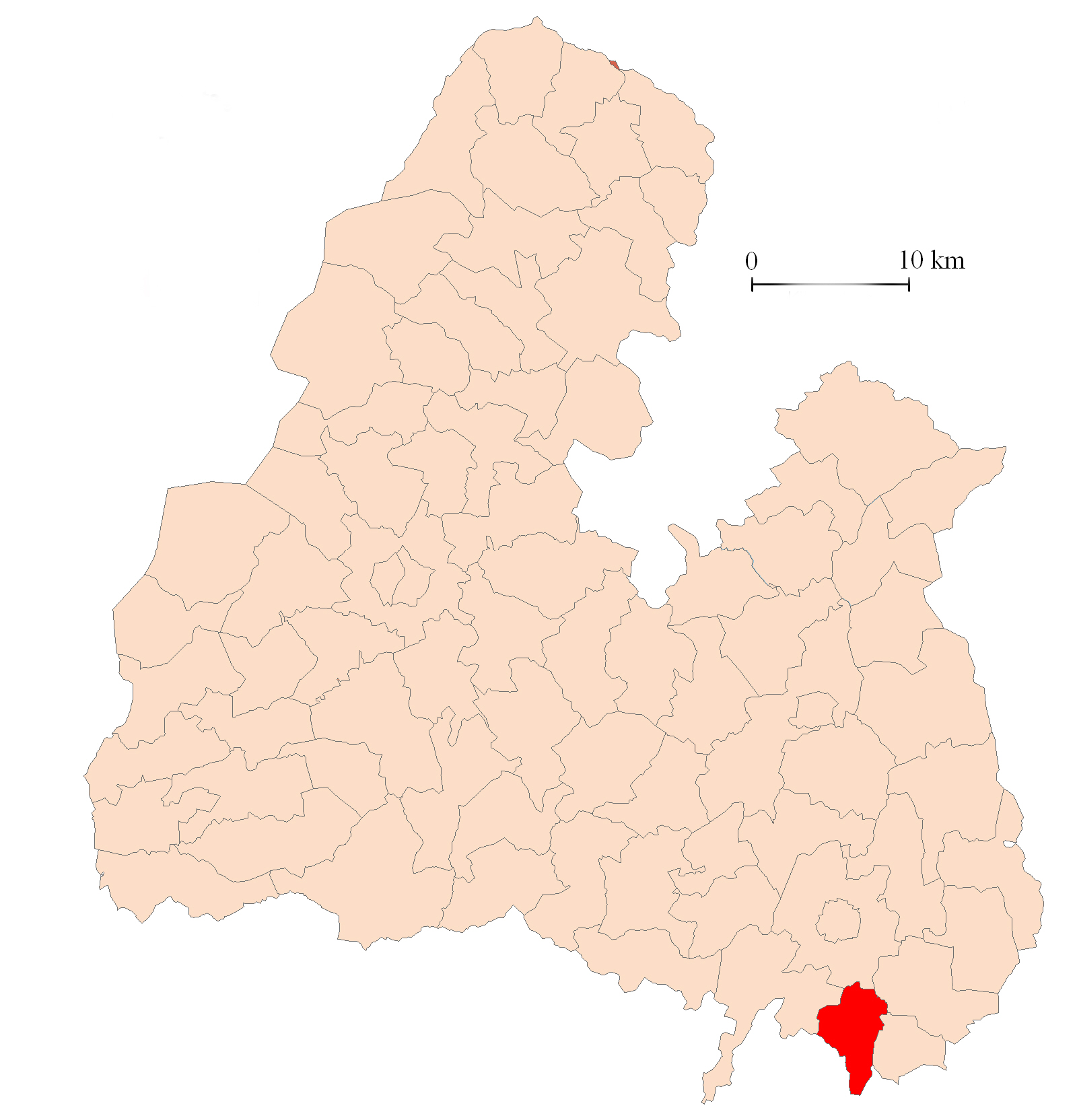
Outline map of North Tipperary, showing the boundaries of Moycarkey electoral division as they were at the time of the 2011 census

Moycarkey is an electoral division in County Tipperary in Ireland. It was originally an electoral division in the Thurles Poor Law Union in North Tipperary but is still used for various administrative purposes.

== Extent of the electoral division ==
From the beginning, for reasons which are explained below, an electoral division which had the same name as a civil parish was not necessarily co-extensive with the civil parish. At the time of the 2011 census, the Moycarkey electoral division was co-extensive with the civil parish of the same name. However, this may not have been the case in 1848; the properties listed in a poor law rate document which is dated October 1948 and which seems to be about Moycarkey electoral division include several townlands that are not in Moycarky civil parish, specifically:

- Cabra, Cloghmartin, Fertiana, Galbertstown (presumably either or both of Galbertstown Lower and Galbertstown Upper), all in Fertiana civil parish
- Newtown in Ballymurreen civil parish.

However, at the time of the 1911 census, the electoral division was co-extensive with the civil parish. The census returns for the division listed households exactly the townlands in the civil parish, showing that all of them except Smithsfarm which, probably because of its small size (just over 18 acres), did not contain any dwelling - indeed, none is shown on either this Ordnance Survey map or this one.

== History ==
On 3 October 1848, Vernon Lanphier of Parkstown in Ballymoreen civil parish was elected as rate collector for Moycarkey electoral division of Thurles Poor Law Union. Shortly thereafter, in 1849, the Poor Law Commissioners dissolved the Thurles Board of Guardians, using their power to dissolve any board that was "failing to provide sufficient funds, or to apply them efficiently in relieving the destitute" and to install their own officers.

== Statistics ==
The population of the division in the 1996 census was 520 and, in 2002, 533 (of which 271 were male and 262 female).

Its population in 2011 was 549, of which males numbered 281 and females were 268. Probably a reflection of the immigration from Eastern Europe to Ireland which had happened in the so-called "Celtic Tiger" period, two of these residents had been born in Poland. The total housing stock was 197, of which 13 were vacant.

== Background ==
When, on the basis of the Poor Law Act (enacted on 31 July 1838), Ireland was divided into Poor Law Unions (by 1847 there were 130 unions, some of which were divided later so that, by 1864, there were 163 unions), the areas used for electing member of the boards of guardians were not, as in England and Wales, civil parishes; instead, electoral divisions were formed by the agglomeration of townlands.) The boundaries of these divisions were drawn by a Poor Law Boundary Commission, the aim being to produce areas of roughly equal rateable value and population. This meant that, while the divisions were almost always contiguous areas, they might have little relation to natural community boundaries. Similarly, the boundaries of the poor law unions themselves often had no relation to those of counties, baronies or civil parishes.

The boundaries of these electoral divisions have largely remained unchanged since the nineteenth century, so their populations vary widely, ranging from 32,305 for the electoral division of Blanchardstown-Blakestown in Fingal to 16 for the electoral divisions of Arigna in County Leitrim and Lackagh in North Tipperary (figures from the 2006 Census of Population).

The terms for these divisions has changed over time. Over time, it has become district electoral division. Under section 23 of the Local Government Act 1994, they were termed electoral divisions. There are 3,440 divisions in the republic and they are the smallest administrative area for which population statistics are published).
