= Littleton, County Tipperary =

Village in County Tipperary, Ireland

Littleton Irish: An Baile Beag
- Village
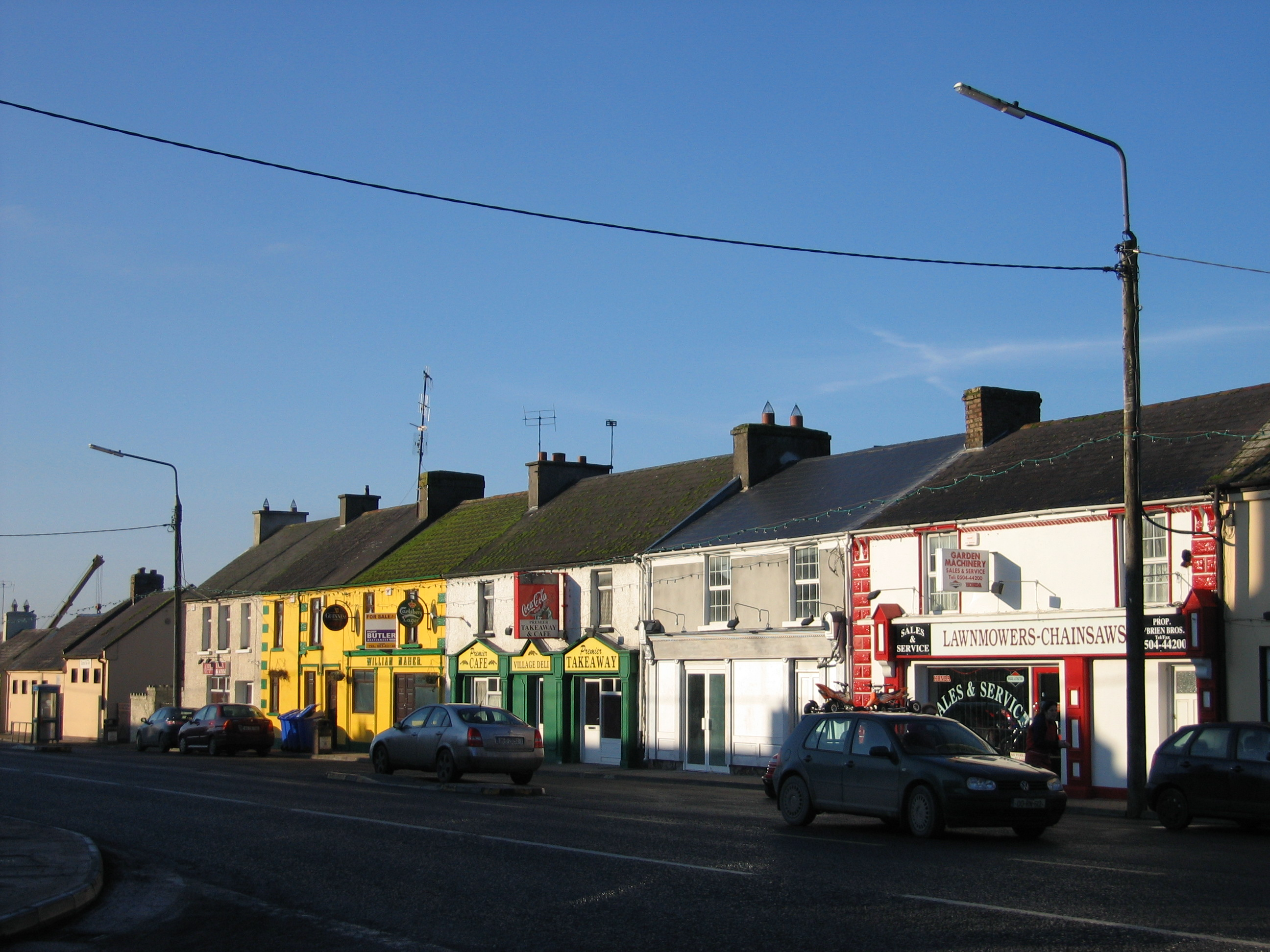
- Main Street

- Location in Ireland
- Coordinates: 52°38′21″N 7°44′18″W
- Country: Ireland
- Province: Munster
- County: County Tipperary

Population (2022)
  - Total: 414

Littleton (Irish: An Baile Beag) is a village in County Tipperary, Ireland. It is within the townlands of Ballybeg and Ballydavid, about 18 km (11 mi) northeast of Cashel and to the southeast of Thurles. By-passed by the M8 in December 2008, Littleton lies at a crossroads on the R639 road. It had a population of 394 at the 2022 census. It is in the historical barony of Eliogarty.

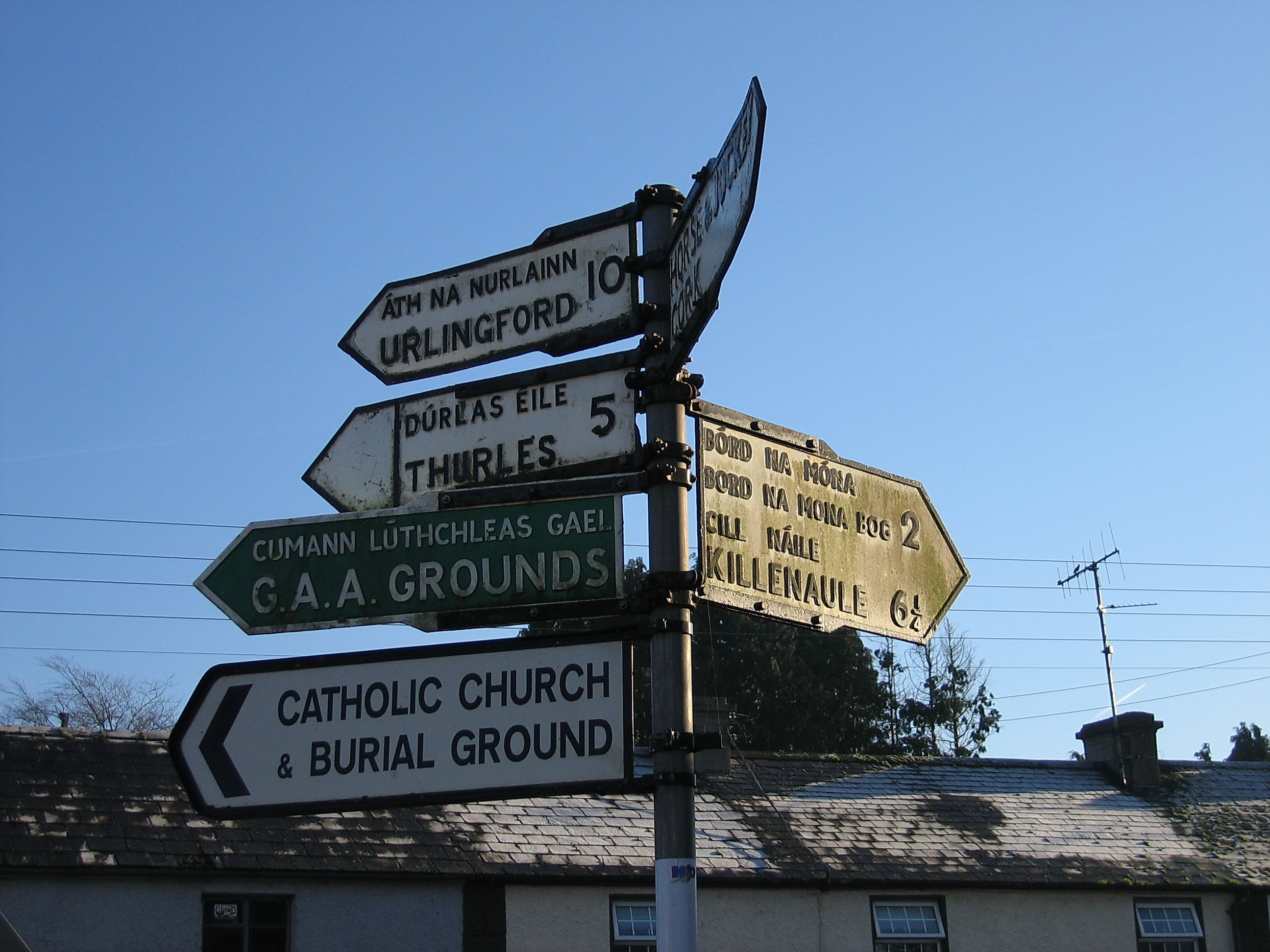
Fingerpost in Littleton

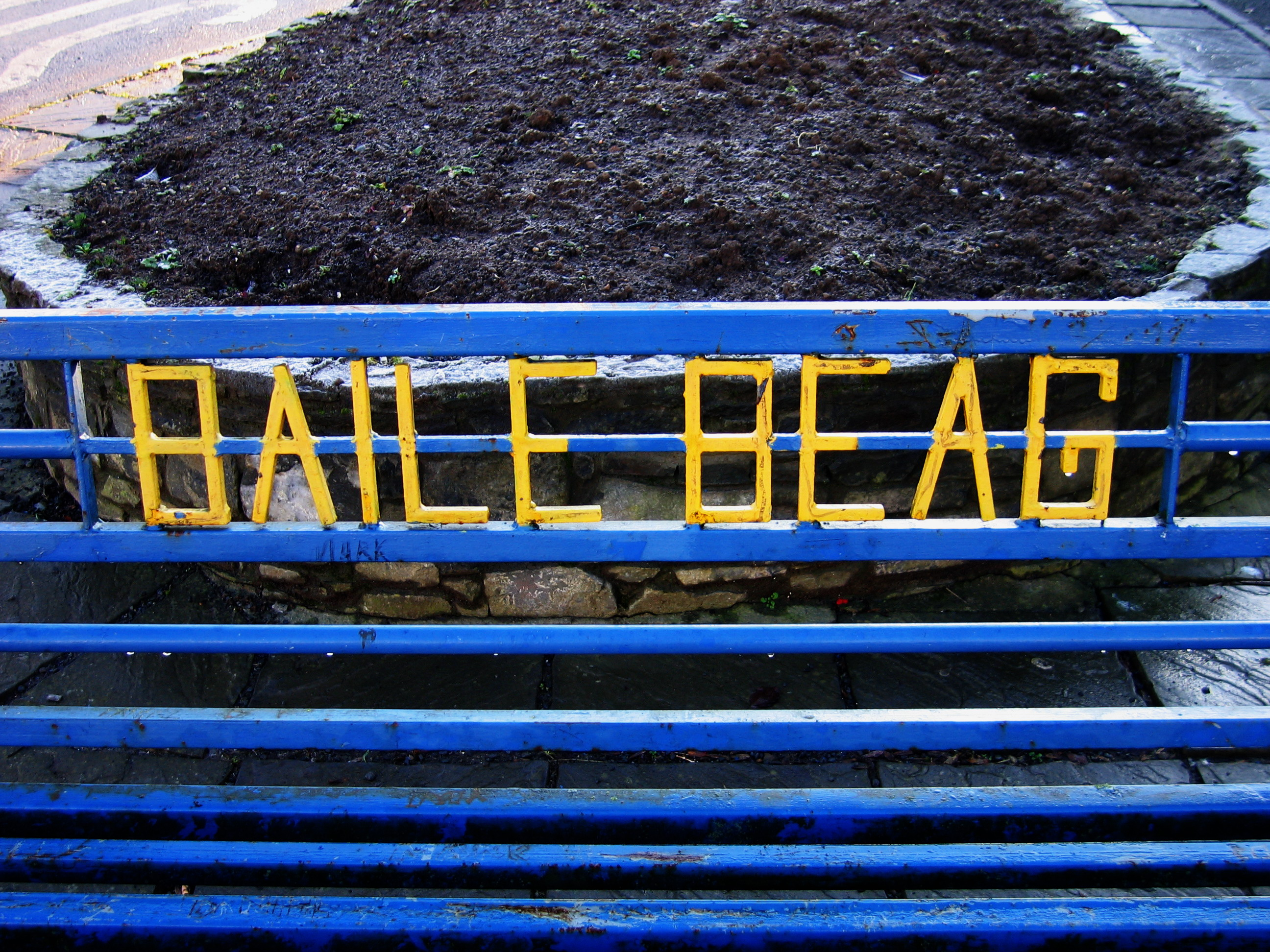
Baile Beag signage on a bench

Littleton is closely associated with Bord na Móna, a semi-state company that harvests peat in the nearby complex of raised bogs. Littleton is also home to the 'Moycarkey Band', the Seán Treacy Pipe Band.

== History ==
St. Ruadhan of Lorrha founded a monastery on a raised island in the middle of the bog at Littleton. The "island" is called Derrynaflan and it became famous when a ninth-century chalice (the Derrynaflan Chalice), a paten, stand and strainer were found there in 1980. These artefacts are now held in the National Museum in Dublin.

A church of the Church of Ireland parish of Borrisleigh was built in 1786 with funding from the Board of First Fruits. In the 1960s, a Catholic church was constructed in Littleton. This church, the church of Our Lady and St. Kevin, is in the Catholic parish of Moycarkey, Littleton and Two-Mile-Borris within the Archdiocese of Cashel and Emly.

== Electoral division ==
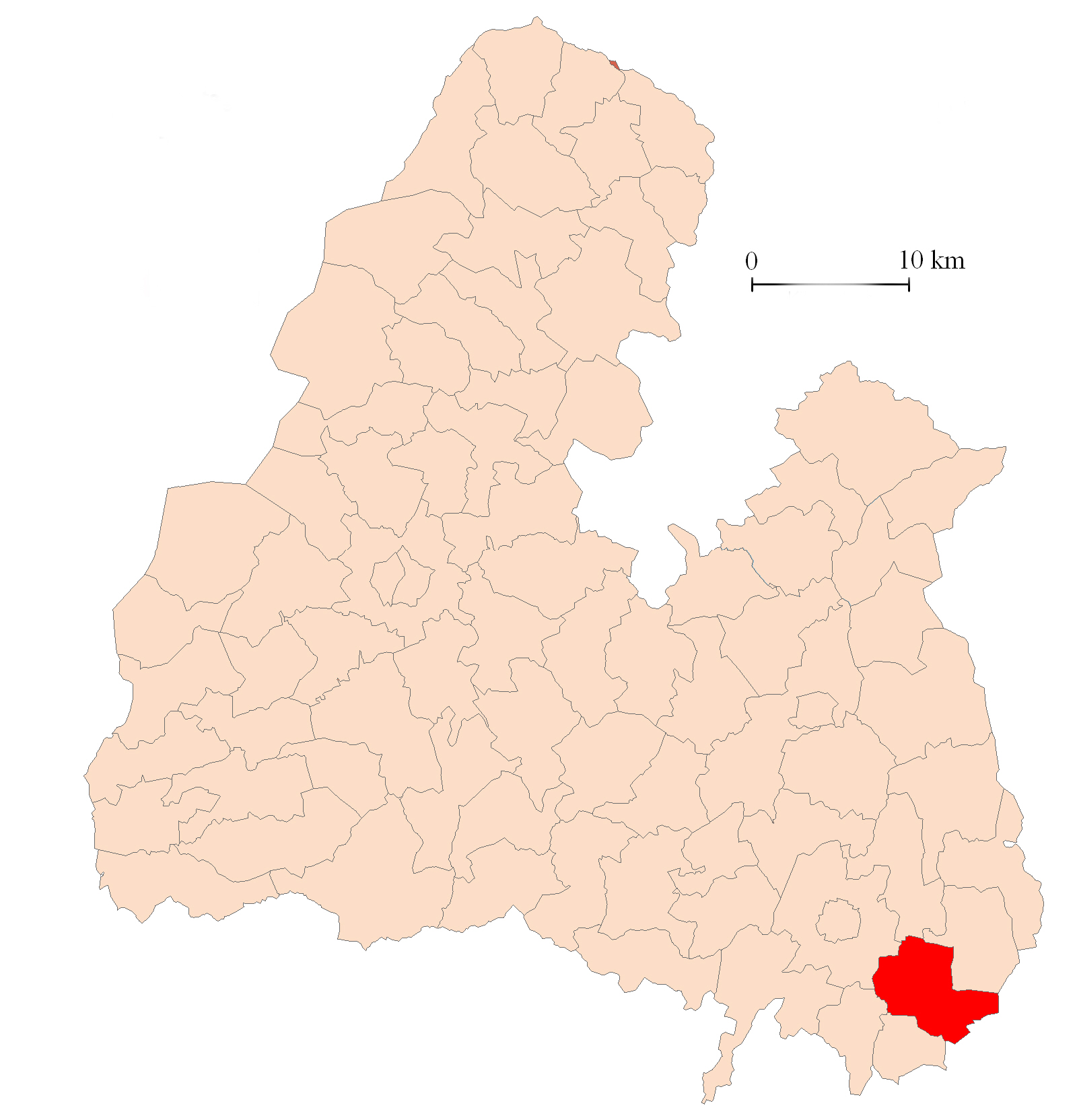
Outline map of North Tipperary, showing the boundaries of Littleton electoral division at the time of the 2011 census

Littleton is an electoral division (ED) which is assigned code number 22071 by the Central Statistics Office. Electoral divisions were originally created in the 1830s as part of the implementation of the Poor Laws. Neighbouring divisions, such as Moycarkey, Ballymurreen, Rahealty and Twomileborris were created to elect the Board of Guardians for the Thurles Poor Law Union; however Littleton division was not created at that time. When it was created, later in the 19th century, it was assembled from townlands taken from neighbouring divisions. These included three townlands (Galbooly, Galbooly Little, Shanacloon) from the civil parish of Galbooly, four townlands (Ballymurreen, Newtown, Rahinch and Rathcunikeen) from Ballymoreen civil parish and nine townlands (Ballybeg, Ballydavid, Ballyerk, Ballynamona, Coolcroo, Derryhogan, Lahardan Lower, Lahardan Upper and Monaraheen) from Twomileborris (Borrisleigh) civil parish.

At the time of the 1891 census, the population of Littleton ED was 901, living in 202 dwellings. At the time of the 1901 census, the population was 876, living in 183 dwellings. By the 1911 census, the total population of the electoral division was 892. There were 179 dwellings, of which 10 were vacant. By the 2011 census, the total population of the electoral division was 1,088 and there were 416 dwellings, of which 30 were vacant. As of the 2022 census, Littleton ED had a population of 1,057.

== Sport ==
The local Gaelic Athletic Association (GAA) club, Moycarkey–Borris GAA, was founded in 1885 and is based in Littleton.

== See also ==
- List of towns and villages in the Republic of Ireland
