= Moycarkey (disambiguation) =

Moycarkey is a hamlet in North Tipperary, Ireland.

Moycarkey or Moycarky may also refer to:

- Moycarky, a civil parish in North Tipperary, Ireland
  - Moycarky (townland)
    - Moycarkey Castle, a castle in the above townland
- Moycarkey (electoral division), originally an electoral district in the Thurles poor law union but still used for various administrative purposes
- Moycarkey, Littleton, Two-Mile-Borris, a Catholic parish in North Tipperary, Ireland
