= Newtown, Eliogarty =

Newtown, Eliogarty may refer to one of two townlands in the Barony of Eliogarty in County Tipperary, Ireland:

- Newtown, Holycross
- Newtown, Ballymurreen
