= Horse and Jockey =

Village in County Tipperary, Ireland

Horse and Jockey An Marcach The Jockey
- Village
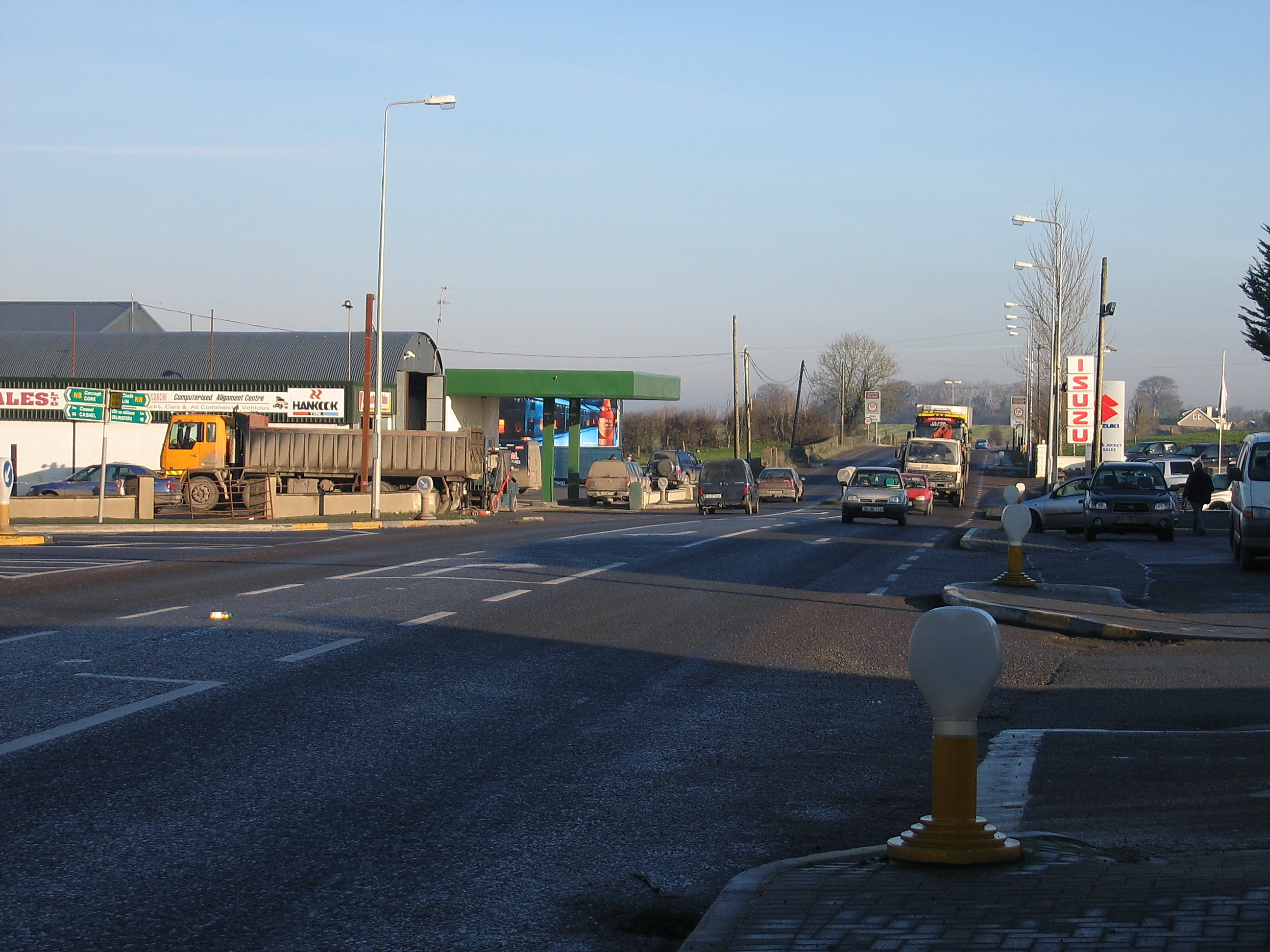
- Junction of R639 with N62 at Horse and Jockey, looking northwards along the R639

- Location in Ireland
- Coordinates: 52.61640°N 7.76818°W
- Country: Ireland
- Province: Munster
- County: County Tipperary
- Irish Grid Reference: S157517

Horse and Jockey (Irish: An Marcach) is a village in County Tipperary, Ireland. It lies on the R639 road, where it meets the N62 road to Thurles. It lies just off junction 6 of the M8 motorway, which by-passed the village in December 2008. It is in the parish of Moycarkey in the barony of Eliogarty.

== Name ==
=== English ===
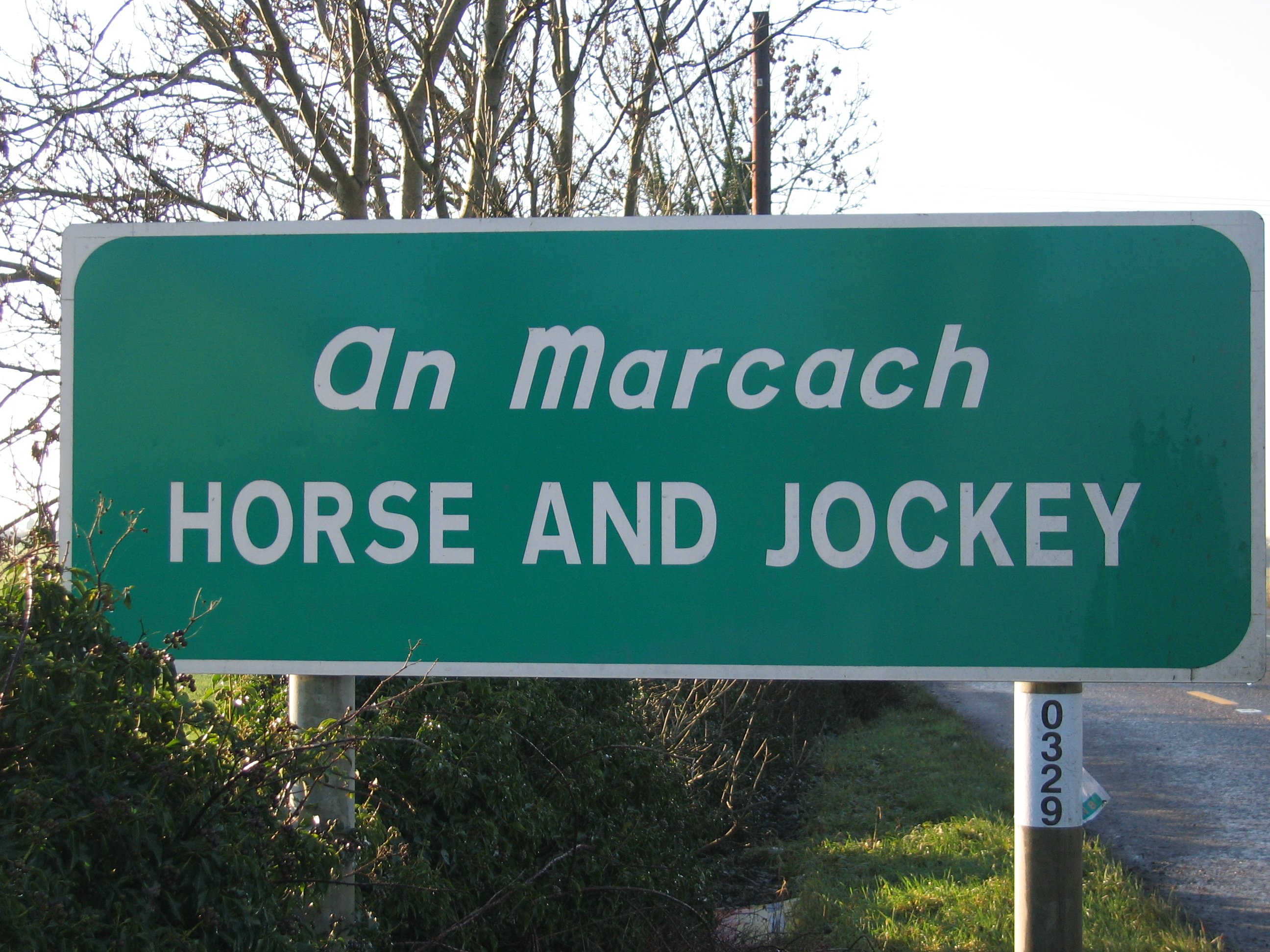
Road sign on the R639.

The origin of the English placename for the village is unclear. Bassett's 1889 directory of County Tipperary listed the village, noting that it had six houses. Some people believe that the placename may have been derived from a public house of the same name. However, although there is currently a hotel called the Horse and Jockey, in the mid-20th century the only public house in the village, from which the current hotel was subsequently developed, was known simply as O'Keeffe's, after the family which owned it. Another tentative suggestion is that, since the village was on a mail coach route, it may have been the location of one of the Bianconi Inns established by the transport magnate, Charles Bianconi, and that the name may be somehow connected with such an establishment, if it existed. If there was such an inn, it may what is indicated by the use of italics in the rendering of the name The Horse and Jockey on a 19th-century map in the Ordnance Survey First Edition 6" Series. If so, the map appears to indicate that the inn was on the north-east corner of the village, instead of the south side of the village where the public house was located in mid-20th century.

=== Irish ===
Although the village now has the official Irish name of An Marcach, this is merely a translation of the modern colloquial English name, The Jockey, an abbreviation of the official name in English. In the mid-20th century, its official name in Irish was Baile na Páirce, the Irish for the townland of Parkstown, Ballymoreen on which the northern part of the village is built. As Irish post offices used Irish language postmarks from 1922, Baile na Páirce was the postmark used in Horse and Jockey post office, which opened in 1923.

== History ==
=== Attack on mail coach ===
In November 1823, a south-bound mail coach was attacked at the village. Shots were fired but the coach managed to get past an obstruction of boulders and carts which had been across the road. However, the coach then capsized. When locals, attracted by the noise, came to the scene the attackers fled and the coach was righted. However, when it reached Clonmel, it was noticed that one passenger was missing. This was the Hon. Mr. Browne, brother of Lord Kenmare. Later, it was learned that he had taken refuge in a house near the site of the attack and arrived in Cork the next day, uninjured.

=== Land agitation murders ===
In 1827, as a result of land agitation, a man from nearby Ballytarsna committed a murder at nearby Rathcannon. His subsequent execution led, in revenge, to a second murder (as well as several attempted and threatened murders) and this, in turn, led to the execution or transportation for life of a dozen men.

=== 1899 All-Ireland hurling championship ===
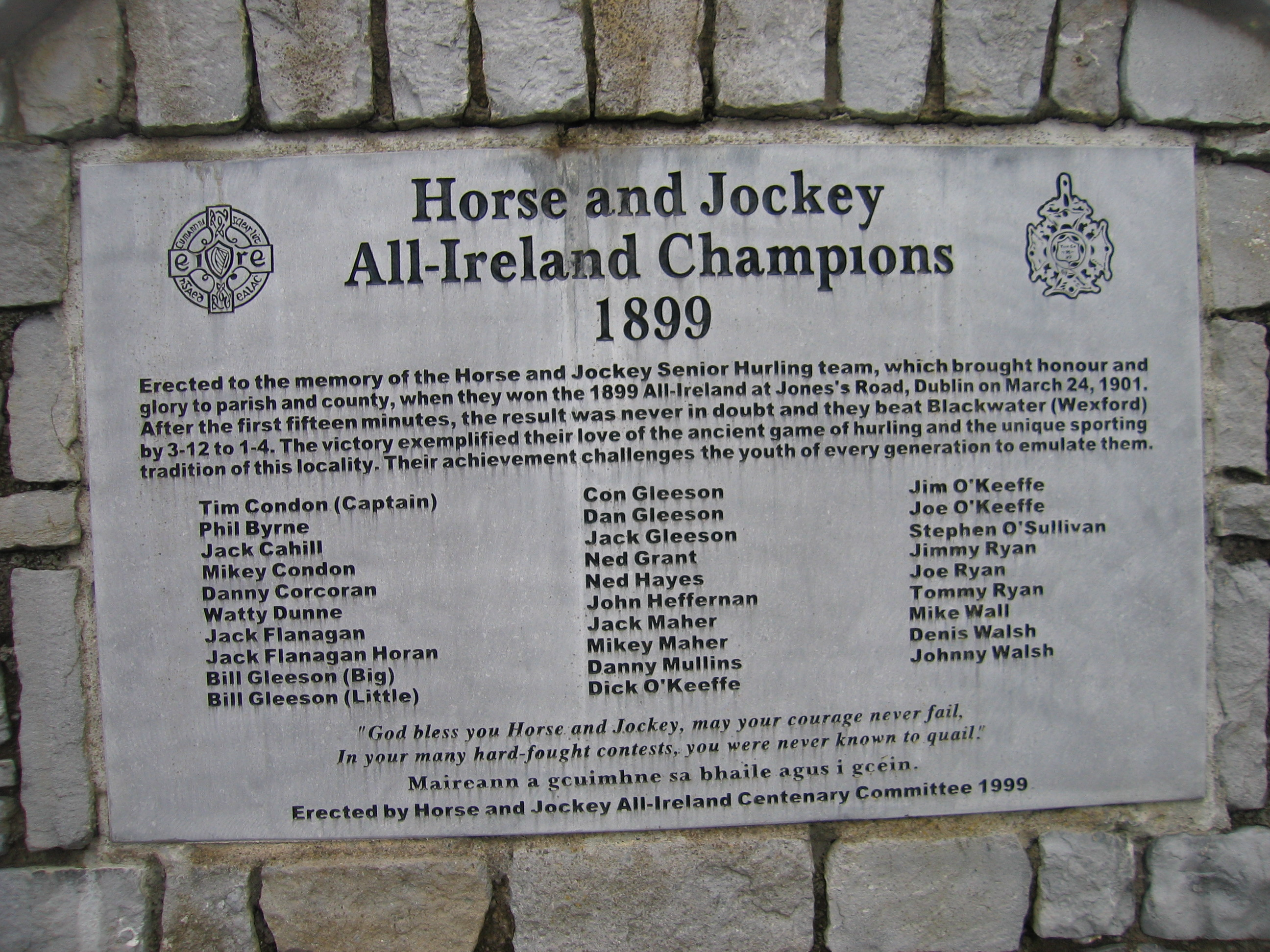
Plaque in commemoration of 1899 All-Ireland Championship

The Horse and Jockey Senior Hurling team, representing County Tipperary, won the 1899 All-Ireland Senior Hurling Championship Final at Jones's Road (now Croke Park) in Dublin, beating the team from Blackwater which represented County Wexford. The match was not actually played in 1899, but actually played two years later, on 24 March 1901.

=== Discovery of the Derrynaflan chalice ===
On 17 February 1980, the Derrynaflan hoard was discovered about two miles east of Horse and Jockey, within the area of the ancient monastery of Derrynaflan Church on an island of dry land in Liskeveen bog which was known locally as "the Gobán Saor's island". The hoard of 8th- or 9th-century religious objects is believed to have been secreted during the Viking raids of the 10th and 11th centuries.

== Transport ==
=== Road ===
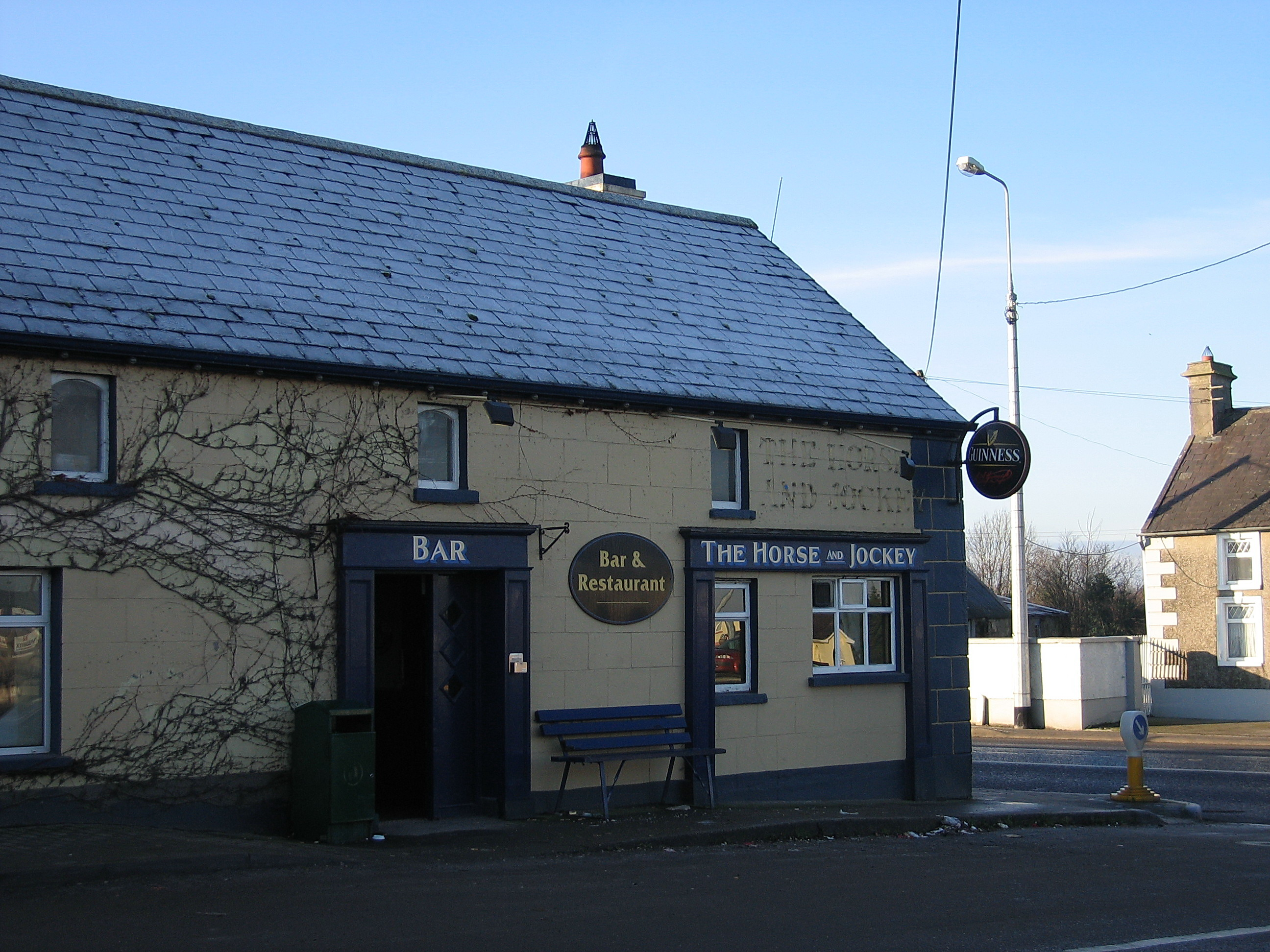
Horse and Jockey pub; in the 1950s and 1960s this was simply called O'Keeffe's, after the family which owned it at the time

Previously located on one of the main routes from Dublin to Cork, during the 19th century, the village was on the route of a mail coach. In November 1823, it was the site of an attack on a south-bound coach.

The N8 national primary route transited the village until 2008, when a section of the M8 motorway was opened to bypass the village. Junction 6 of the M8 motorway is located to the west of the village.

=== Rail ===
Horse and Jockey railway station, on the line between Thurles and Clonmel, opened on 1 July 1880, closed for passenger traffic on 9 September 1963 and finally closed altogether on 27 March 1967.

After the Thurles-Clonmel railway closed, the railway bridge at Horse and Jockey was demolished. Prior to its demolition, it had been a prominent landmark on the main road between Cork and Dublin, because its steepness and narrowness forced traffic to slow down considerably.

=== Bus ===
Bus Éireann's expressway service between Dublin and Cork ceased to serve Horse and Jockey in June 2012. Horse and Jockey is served by a Local Link bus service.

== Sport ==
=== Hurling ===
The village team won the 1899 All-Ireland championship. However, for many years, Horse and Jockey, for GAA purposes, has contributed players to the Moycarkey Borris GAA Club.

=== Handball ===
On the road leading eastward from the village, there is a handball alley. This was refurbished in 1954 and, unusually, is roofed-over. A local handballer, Michael Shanahan (1935-2007), from the nearby townland of Kylenoe, won many county, Munster and All-Ireland titles. Partnered by Tom Doheny, from The Commons, he won the All-Ireland junior hardball doubles championship in 1958 and four years later, in partnership with John Ryan, also from The Commons, he won the All-Ireland senior doubles championship.

=== Dog racing ===
In the mid-1960s, there was a small dog-racing track in the village. It was located on the north side of the Thurles-Clonmel railway, just east of the main Cork-Dublin road, just behind O'Keeffe's public house. The site is now occupied by part of the Horse and Jockey Hotel complex. Racing was not restricted to greyhounds. The "hare" was pulled by a man in small hut at the eastern end of the track, just beside the ball alley.

== See also ==
- List of towns and villages in Ireland
