= Moycarkey, Littleton, Two-Mile-Borris =

- Roman Catholic parish
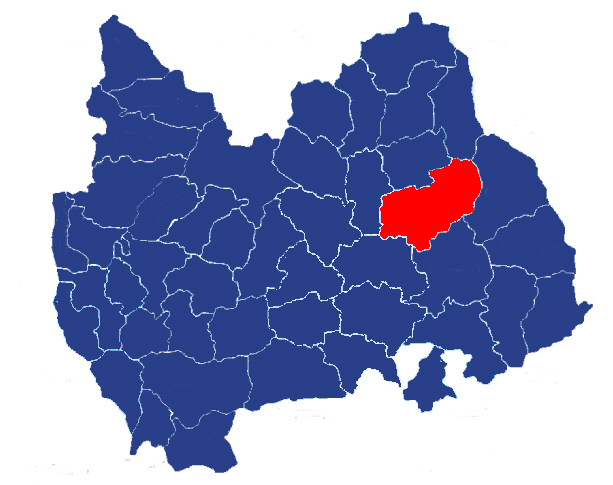
- Location of Moycarkey, Littleton Two-Mile-Borris in Cashel and Emly

- Location in Ireland
- Coordinates: 52.63°N 7.75°W
- Country: Ireland
- Province: Munster
- County: County Tipperary

Moycarkey, Littleton, Two-Mile-Borris (also known as Moycarkey and Borris or Moycarkey) is an ecclesiastical parish in the Cashel deanery of the Roman Catholic Archdiocese of Cashel and Emly. There are three churches in the parish:

- St Peter's, Moycarkey (where the parochial house is located)
- St James's, Two-Mile-Borris
- Our Lady and St Kevin, Littleton (which also serves the village of Horse and Jockey)

== Relationship to civil parishes ==
The Catholic parish of Moycarkey contains some or all of the lands of several civil parishes, including Moycarky, Ballymoreen and, it would appear, Fertiana and Galbooly, as well, possibly, parts of some civil parishes in South Tipperary.

== Sports clubs ==
Sports clubs in the parish include Moycarkey-Borris GAA club.
