= Templetuohy (disambiguation) =

Templetuohy is a village in North Tipperary.

Templetuohy may also refer to:

- Templetouhy (civil parish), which includes the village
- Templetouhy and Moyne (parish), a parish in the Roman Catholic Archdiocese of Cashel and Emly
- Moyne-Templetuohy GAA, a sporting club organised by Tipperary GAA
