= Galbertstown =

Galbertstown can refer to either

- Galbertstown Lower, a townland in Fertiana civil parish in County Tipperary
- Galbertstown Upper, a townland in Fertiana civil parish in County Tipperary
