= Knockroe =

Townland in County Tipperary, Ireland

Coordinates: 52°38′21″N 7°47′15″W

Knockroe is a townland containing a little over 363 acres in Moycarky civil parish and in the ecclesiastical parish of Moycarkey, Littleton, Two-Mile-Borris, in County Tipperary, Ireland.

Its population at the time of the 1891 census was 65; in 1901 it was 54; and, in 1911, it was 44, of whom 28 were male and 16 female.

This townland is probably the Knockroe mentioned in references to a monster meeting held by Daniel O'Connell in September 1845, on which occasion he stayed in Turtulla House.
