= Ballymoreen (townland) =

Townland in County Tipperary, Ireland

Coordinates: 52.6327°N 7.7505°W

Ballymoreen, or Ballymurreen (Irish: Baile Amoraoin), is a townland in the civil parish of the same name in County Tipperary in Ireland. It is within the historical barony of Eliogarty in the south-east corner of North Tipperary, between Littleton and Horse and Jockey. Evidence of ancient settlement in Ballymurreen include a number of ringfort sites, a ruined church and graveyard dating to at least the 17th century, and the former site of a tower house and bawn. The townland, which is 1.3 square kilometres (0.5 sq mi) in area, had a population of 65 as of the 2011 census.
