= Liskeveen, County Tipperary =

Liskeveen Lios Caoimhín
- village
- Location in Ireland
- Coordinates: 52.60827°N 7.75198°W
- Country: Ireland
- Province: Munster
- County: County Tipperary
- Irish Grid Reference: S168508

Liskeveen, also written Liskevin or Liscaveen, is a townland in County Tipperary in Ireland. Occupying 1453 acres, it is located in the civil parish of Ballymoreen in the barony of Eliogarty in the poor law union of Thurlesl.

There are two estate houses in the townland. Heathview House was marked on the first edition of the Ordnance Survey map as Liskeveen House. The house now called Liskeveen House was marked on the first edition of the Ordnance Survey map as Fanny Ville.

Liskeveen House (formerly Fanny Ville) was extended sometime in the mid-19th century. At the time of Griffith's Valuation, it was valued at £30+, occupied by Samuel M. Going and held by him in fee.

Heathview House (formerly Liskeveen House) was owned by Luke Bray in 1814. At the time of Griffith's Valuation, the house was in the possession of Samuel M. Going and valued at £14.18 shillings. In mid-19th century, a new house was built slightly to the south of the original house; this is the building known as Heathview which, in the late 19th century, was occupied by Going's daughter, Margaret, and her husband, Owen Lloyd Mansergh.
