= Curraheen =

Curraheen is the name of townlands and features in several counties in Ireland. It can refer to

- Curraheen, County Cork
- Curraheen, County Kerry
- Curraheen, County Tipperary (disambiguation)
- Curraheen Park, a greyhound racing track in Bishopstown, County Cork, Ireland
- Curraheen River, a river in County Cork, Ireland
