= Parkstown =

Parkstown Baile na Páirce
- townland
- Location in Ireland
- Coordinates: 52.61640°N 7.76818°W
- Country: Ireland
- Province: Munster
- County: County Tipperary
- Irish Grid Reference: S157517

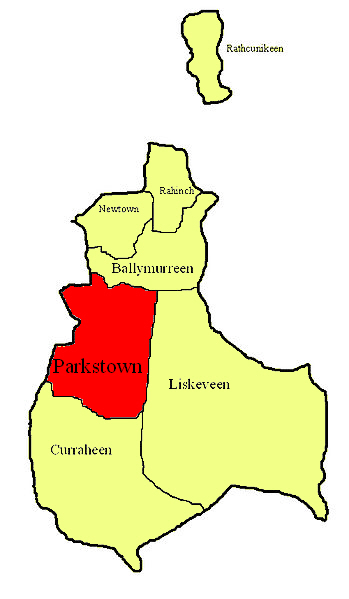
Location of Parkstown in the civil parish of Ballymoreen

Parkstown is a townland in County Tipperary in Ireland. Occupying 624 acres, it is located in the civil parish of Ballymoreen in the barony of Eliogarty in the poor law union of Thurles.

Its name in Irish, Baile na Páirce, was, in mid-20th century, used as the official Irish name of the village of Horse and Jockey, the northern half of which is built on the townland, at its south-western corner; it appeared on official road-signs and was the name used in the postmark at the post office in the village.

== Parkstown House ==
There is a townland house or estate house, Parkstown House. The Lamphier family lived at Parkstown House from at least the 1770s; Thomas John Lanphier was the freeholder in 1776. Henry Langley lived there in 1814 and John Pennefather Lamphier was living there in 1837 and in the early 1850s; he held the property, whose buildings were valued at more than £23, from the Court of Chancery and was the occupant at the time of its sale in 1852.

The Parkstown lands of the Lanphier family were part of the land which, in the mid-19th century, Vernon Lamphier (who was elected, on 3 October 1848, as rate collector for Moycarkey poor law district) held from Viscount Hawarden. The 385-acre estate of John P. Lanphier was advertised for sale in the Encumbered Estates' Court in April 1852. The property was held under a grant in perpetuity, dated 17 February 1852 and made by Wray Palliser to John P. Lanphier and Vernon Lanphier.

Since the 1852 sale, the house and some of the land that forms part of Parkstown townland have passed through various hands, including families called O'Keeffe and Armitage; it has belonged to the Maher family since 1955. The building is still, in the early 21st century, a fine residence.

== Parkstown Castle ==
Just to the west of Parkstown House, roughly where the walled orchard now stands, is the site of a medieval castle, Parkstown Castle.
