= Rathcannon =

Townland in County Tipperary, Ireland

- Townland
- Location in Ireland
- Coordinates: 52.6291037°N 7.9239319°W
- Country: Ireland
- Province: Munster
- County: Tipperary

Rathcannon is a townland in County Tipperary, Ireland. It is in the civil parish of Holycross, 9 km south-west of Thurles.

Rathcannon Bridge carries the R661 road over the River Clodagh, a tributary of the River Suir.

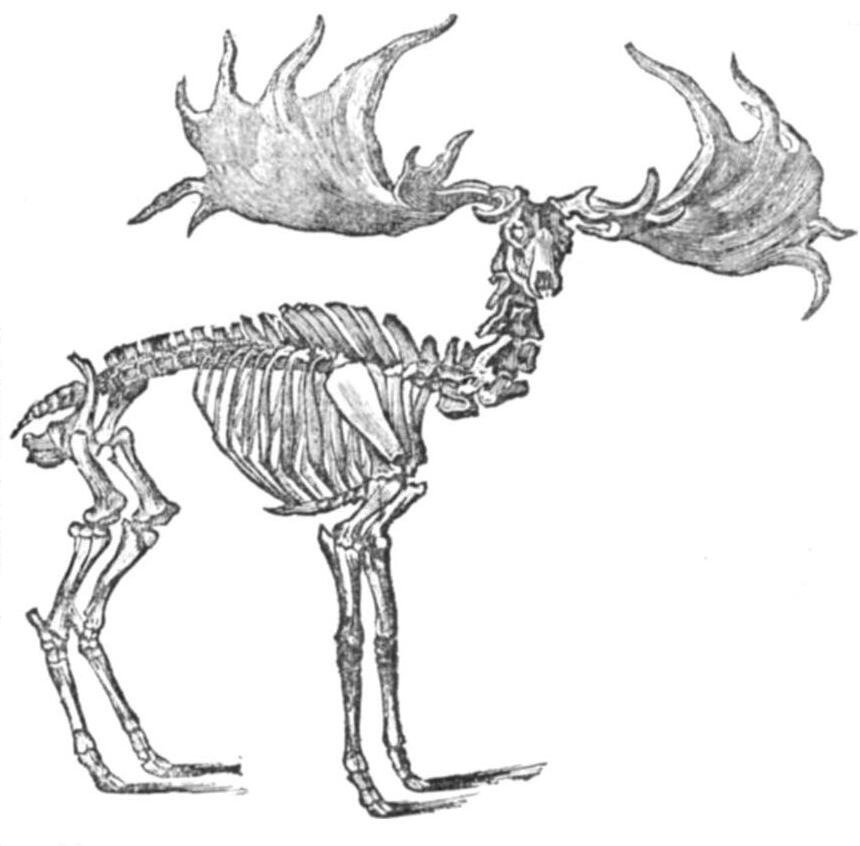
An illustration of the Irish Elk skeleton unearthed by William Maunsell from a Rathcannon peat bog in 1824

== Murders, execution and transportation ==
On 30 June 1827, a murder was committed at Rathcannon, which led to another murder, an attempted murder, the execution of six men and the transportation of six others for life.

Richard Chadwick (1800–1827) of Reddans Walk, just north of Tipperary town, was a local magistrate as well as land agent for his uncle, William Sadlier of Sadleirswells House (later known as Kingswell House), north of Tipperary town, a landlord who owned considerable properties in County Tipperary and was an active supporter and promoter of the Orange Order in Tipperary town. Having trouble with some of his uncle's tenants, Chadwick, in May 1827, had permission to erect a police barracks at Rathcannon, in order to curb and monitor the activities of secret societies operating in the area. The first sod was turned at noon on 30 June 1827. Shortly afterwards, Chadwick was murdered as, accompanied by Philip Mara, he led his horse along the road (which is now known as the R661 road) between Rathcannon and Bohernacrusha. He was shot at the point where a bridge was later erected, around 1847, to carry the road over the tracks of the Cork-Dublin railway. The man who fired the shot was Paddy Grace, a native of Ballytarsna. He had an armed accomplice, Lawrence Barry from a nearby place called The Hough.

Grace was tried at Clonmel Assize in July 1827 and, convicted on 17 August on the evidence of Philip Mara, was hanged at the scene of the murder in Rathcannon on 20 August 1827; he admitted his guilt on the gallows and urged his brothers, and others present, to desist from unlawful practises. Barry was tried but was acquitted because Philip Mara could not identify him with confidence. Before Paddy Grace was executed, Philip Mara, fearing revenge from Grace's brothers and friends, gave possession of his farm to his brothers and fled to England.

On 1 October 1827, Philip Mara's brother, Daniel Mara, was murdered about 100 yards on the Holycross side of Bohernacrusha. Another brother of Philip Mara fled for safety to Borrisokane, where at attempt was made to shoot him while he was at Mass. A mare, owned by John Burke of Barnalisheen, near Moyne, who was married to a sister of Philip Mara, was ripped open and killed causing Burke to leave the country in fear for his life.

The authorities sent the remaining Mara brothers out of the country for their own safety.

In March–April 1828, Patrick Lacy and John Walsh were tried for the murder of Daniel Mara and convicted, the main witnesses for the prosecution being their accomplices, Thomas Fitzgerald (who was arrested while participating in an armed robbery near Killenaule and, while in jail in Clonmel, turned informer to save himself) and Edmond Ryan of Ballymoreen. The trial finished at 4.00 pm on 1 April 1828 and at noon on 3 April Lacy and Walsh were hanged outside the jail in Clonmel. Pat and Jack Keogh, sons of Tom Keogh, from near Rathcannon were also tried for Daniel Mara's murder and executed on 10 April 1828. Piery Grace and John Russell were also tried and, convicted, were executed on 16 April 1828.

William Grace, Thomas Keogh, Michael Treacy, Thomas Maher, Michael Luby and James Daniel who had changed their pleas to guilty were also sentenced to death but an express messenger arrived from the Marquis of Anglesea, the Lord Lieutenant, with an order to commuting their execution to transportation.
