= Derrynaflan Church =

- Teampall Dhoire na bhFlann (Irish)
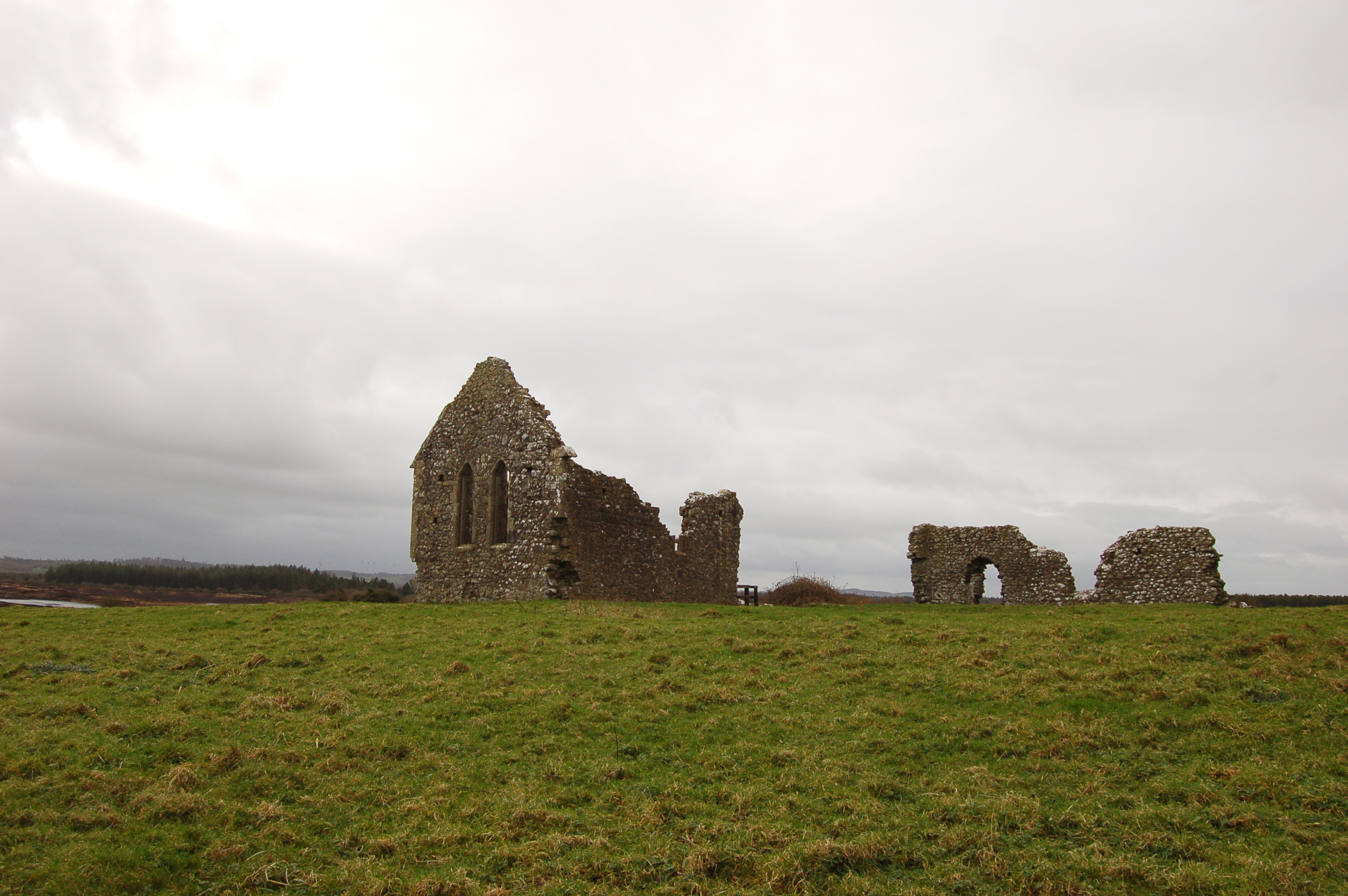
- The site in January 2022.

- Location within Ireland
- 52.597318°N 7.733818°W
- Type: church
- Location: Lurgoe, Littleton Bog, County Tipperary, Ireland

History
- Built: 11th–13th century AD

Site notes
- Elevation: 139 m (456 ft)
- Architectural styles: Romanesque, Gothic

National monument of Ireland
- Official name: Derrynaflan Church
- Reference no.: 335

Derrynaflan Church is a medieval church and National Monument located in County Tipperary, Ireland.

== Location ==
Derrynaflan Church is located on an "island" in Littleton bog, located 4.5 kilometres (2.8 mi) south of Littleton.

== History ==
The monastery at Derrynaflan ("Oak grove of the Flanns"; formerly Daire Eidnech, "ivied oak grove") was founded by Ruadhán of Lorrha in the 6th century AD. It came under the patronage of the King-Bishops of Cashel. It was an important culdee centre, but went into decline after Fedelmid mac Crimthainn died in AD 846. Only the enclosure survives.

The surviving stone church is a pre-Norman cell with a chancel later added.

A Franciscan community existed at Derrynaflan between 1676 and 1717.

It is famous as the discovery site of the Derrynaflan Hoard of gold and silver objects of the 8th–9th century.

A stone slab found on the site (now in the National Museum of Ireland – Archaeology) is inscribed OR DOAN MAIN DVBSCVLL, "a prayer for the soul of Dubscuile."

== Description ==
A pre-Norman single-celled church without antae. The east, north and south walls of the chancel with five windows and the foundations of the nave survive.

There is also a ring barrow and medieval cemetery. To the northeast is a burial site, supposedly that of the legendary Gobán Saor.

== Gallery ==
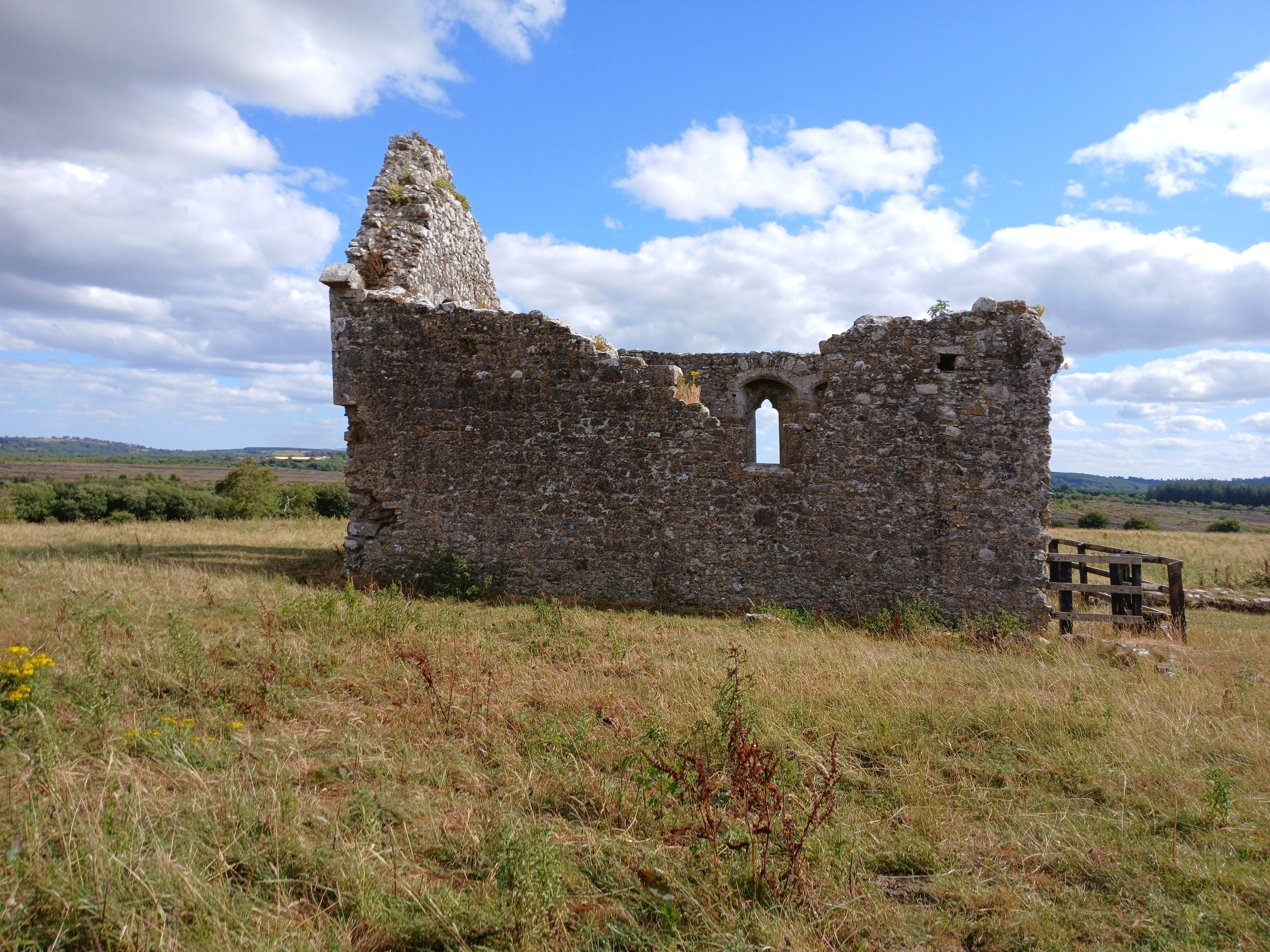
The exterior of the church as seen from the north

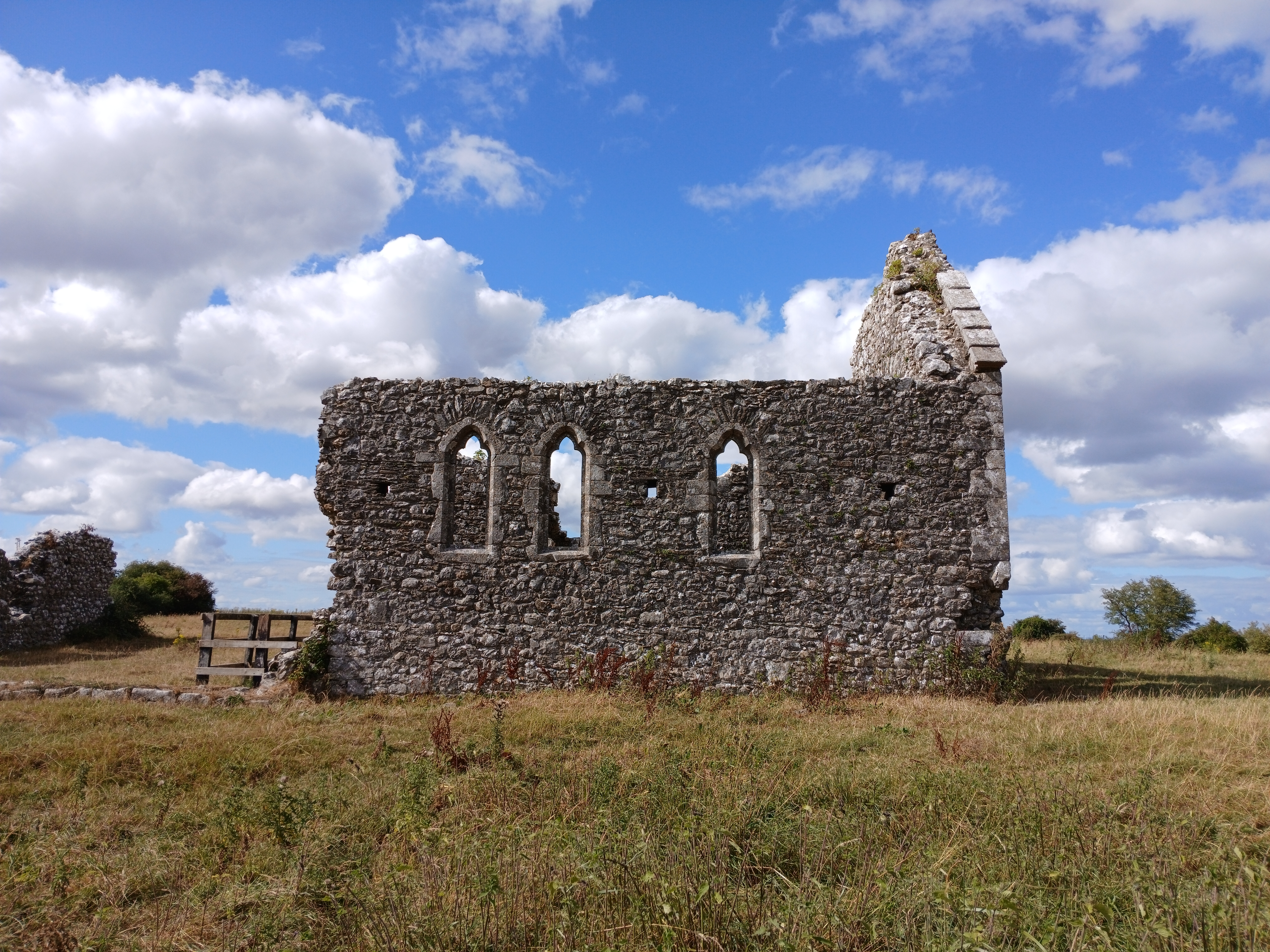
The exterior as seen from the south

The exterior as seen from the southwest

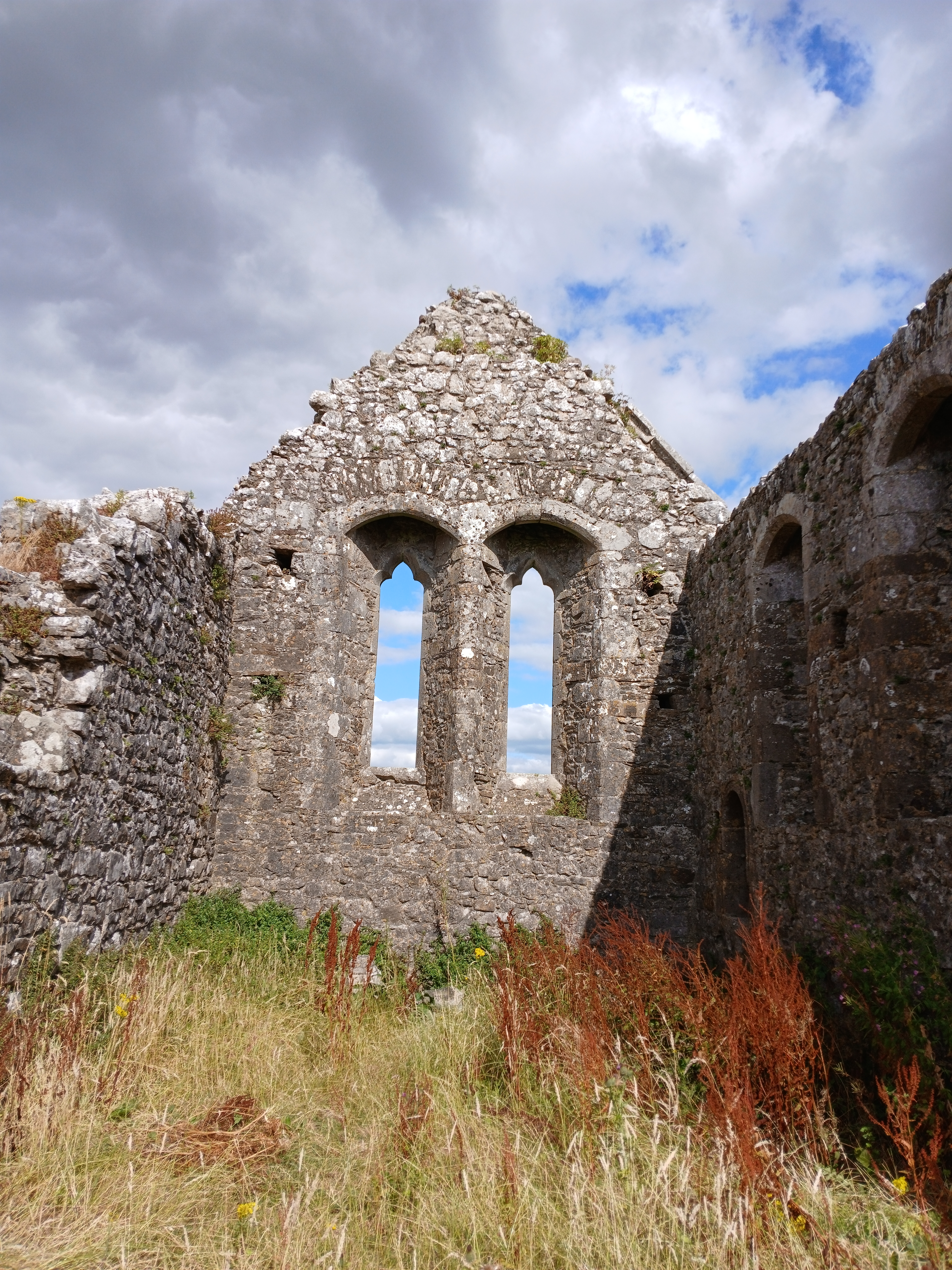
East gable interior view

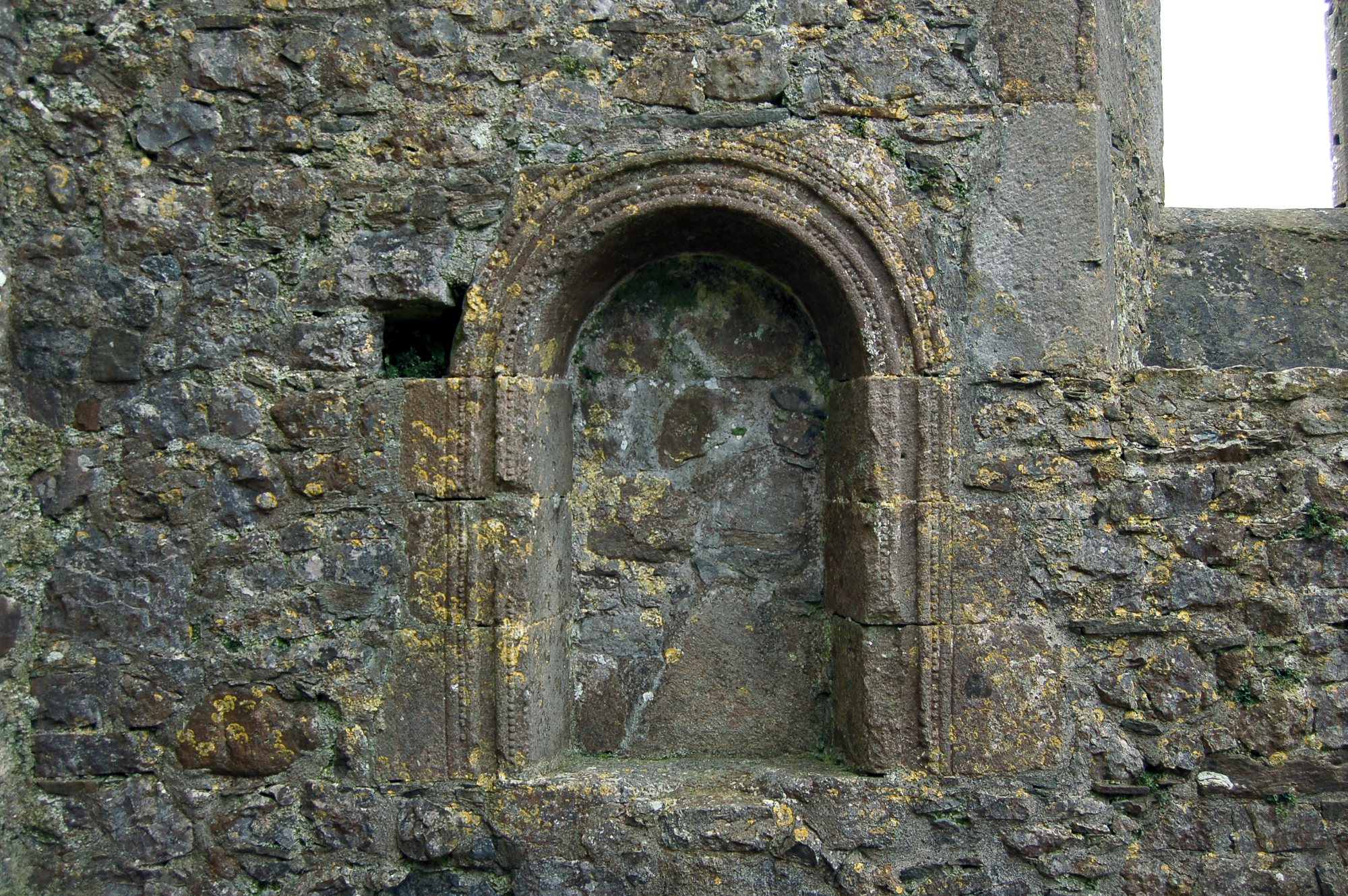
Piscina or niche built from recycled Romanesque window surrounds in the interior south wall
