= Curraheen, Ballymoreen =

Curraheen...
- village
- Location in Ireland
- Coordinates: 52.6079°N 7.7662°W
- Country: Ireland
- Province: Munster
- County: County Tipperary

Curraheen is a townland in County Tipperary in Ireland. Occupying 895 acres, it is located in the civil parish of Ballymoreen in the barony of Eliogarty in the poor law union of Thurles.
