= Bohernacrusha, County Tipperary =

Bohernacrusha Bóthar na Croise
- Village
- Location in Ireland
- Coordinates: 52.633°N 7.895°W
- Country: Ireland
- Province: Munster
- County: County Tipperary

Bohernacrusha (Irish: Bóthar na Croise) is a small village in County Tipperary. It is located a short distance south-westwards along the R661 road from Holycross.

On 1 October 1827, Daniel Mara was murdered about 100 yards on the Holycross side of Bohernacrusha. This murder led to the execution of six men and the transportation of six others for life.
