= Ballyhenry, County Tipperary =

Townland in County Tipperary, Ireland

Coordinates: 53°33′N 9°07′W

Ballyhenry (Baile an Hanraígh in Irish) is a townland in the Barony of Ikerrin, County Tipperary, Ireland. It is located in the civil parish of Bourney south of Roscrea.
