= Moycarky (townland) =

Townland in County Tipperary, Ireland

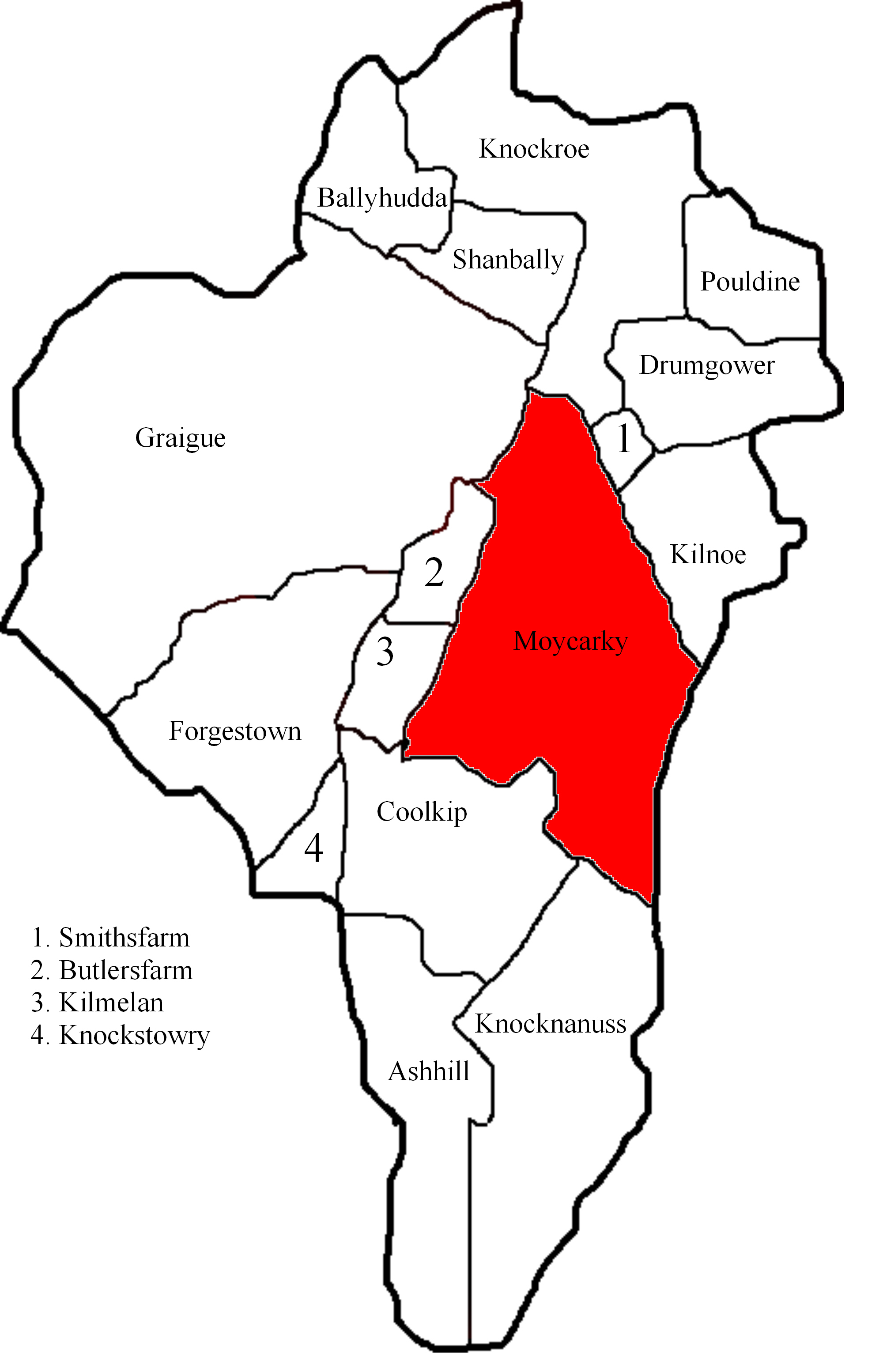
Location of the townland within the civil parish

Moycarky is a townland in the civil parish of the same name and in the ecclesiastical parish of Moycarkey, Littleton, Two-Mile-Borris, in County Tipperary, Ireland.

The townland is shaped like an elongated diamond whose main axis is oriented roughly north-south; it contains just over 518 acres. The hamlet of Moycarkey is located near the northern apex of the townland.

The minor country road which serves as the communication spine for the townland runs roughly north-north-westwards from the old main Cork-Dublin road, which cross the townland near its southern apex.

Maxfort House, the main house in the townland, lies to the west of this minor country road. In 1814, the house was the home of John Max and, in 1837, the home of William Max. It was held from Viscount Hawarden and valued at £15 and 18 shillings.

At the time of the 1911 census, there were 19 households in the townland.
