= Rahinch, County Tipperary =

Rahinch
- Townland
- Location in Ireland
- Coordinates: 52.6415°N 7.7492°W
- Country: Ireland
- Province: Munster
- County: County Tipperary

Rathinch or Rahinch (Irish: Ráth Inse) is a small townland in the civil parish of Ballymurreen in County Tipperary, Ireland. At the time of the 1911 census, there were three households (of the Delaney, Kearney and Cass families) in the townland. The 2011 census doesn't record a population for Rahinch townland.

== See also ==
- Littleton, County Tipperary
