= Ikerrin =

Barony in County Tipperary, Ireland

Ikerrin (Irish: Uí Chairín) is a barony in County Tipperary, Ireland. This geographical unit of land is one of 12 baronies in County Tipperary. Its chief town is Roscrea. The barony lies between Eliogarty to the south (whose chief town is Thurles) and Ormond Upper to the west (whose chief town is Toomevara). As a "peninsula", it is surrounded on three sides by counties Offaly and Laois. The territory is currently administered by Tipperary County Council.

== Legal context ==
Baronies were created after the Norman invasion of Ireland as divisions of counties and were used the administration of justice and the raising of revenue. While baronies continue to be officially defined units, they have been administratively obsolete since 1898. However, they continue to be used in land registration and in specification, such as in planning permissions. In many cases, a barony corresponds to an earlier Gaelic túath which had submitted to the Crown.

== Modern times ==
When County Tipperary was split into North and South Ridings in 1836, Ikerrin was allocated to the north riding. However, the neighbouring barony of Kilnamanagh was split into Upper and Lower half-baronies, being allocated to the north and south ridings respectively.

== Civil parishes and towns of the barony ==
Clonakenny, Curragunneen and Ballyhenry.

=== Civil parishes ===
This table lists an historical geographical sub-division of the barony known as the civil parish (not to be confused with an Ecclesiastical parish).

Name in Irish	Name in English
Bearnan Eile	Barnane-Ely or Barnane
Boirinn	Bourney
Buiríos na Fearna	Borrisnafarney
Cill Momhéanóg	Killavinoge
Cill Ó Sceacháin	Killoskehan
Cill Shléibhe	Killea
An Corrbhaile	Corbally
Ráth Mobheóg	Rathnaveoge
Ros Cré	Roscrea
Teampall Rí	Templeree
Teampall Tuaithe	Templetouhy

Note 1: While the bulk of the civil parish of Templemore lies in the barony of Eliogarty, five townlands lie in the barony of Ikerrin. They are Clontaaffe, Curraduff, Craiguedarg, Graiguebeg, Killough.

Note 2: While the bulk of the civil parish of Cullenwaine lies in the barony of Clonlisk in the county of Offaly, three townlands lie in the barony of Ikerrin in the county of Tipperary. They are Derrycallaghan, Drumbaun and Greenhills.

Note 3: The civil parish of Killoskehan in unusual in having only one townland which bears the same name as the parish.

== See also ==
- List of civil parishes of County Tipperary
- Viscount Ikerrin
