= Ballysheehan =

Village in County Tipperary, Ireland

Ballysheehan Irish: Baile Uí Shíocháin
- Village
- Location in Ireland
- Coordinates: 52°33′26″N 7°51′38″W
- Country: Ireland
- Province: Munster
- County: Tipperary
- Elevation: 100 m (330 ft)

Population (2011)
  - Total: 499
- Time zone: UTC+0 (WET)
  - Summer (DST): UTC-1 (IST (WEST))

Ballysheehan (Irish: Baile Uí Shíocháin) is a village in the southern part of County Tipperary, Ireland. It is also a civil parish in the barony of Middle Third, within the Munster province.

In terms of area, it is approximately 0.64 square miles, or a little more than about 412 acres, making it the "810th largest townland" in Tipperary. Additionally, it sits within the Electoral Division of Cashel. Historically, it has been a Protestant community.

The town itself is only about 3 miles north of Cashel and near Fethard, with Ballytarsna as one of the many townlands within Ballysheehan's parish. Additionally, Ballysheehan is one of the variants of the Clogheen Catholic parish in the Diocese of Waterford and Lismore and County Tipperary.

The town's name comes from baile, which means townland, town or homestead. It was created sometime before 1641. That year, the castle of one "William Kingsmill", which sat in the parish, was raided as noted in a local history. The same history also recounts varying individuals living in the parish during the 18th century. Adding to this are scattered mentions in other varying histories of Britain and Ireland along with official documents of the period.

== Location, transportation, and history ==
The village is situated on the R639 which runs through varying counties other than Tipperary, such as County Laois, County Limerick, and County Cork. In 1837, Samuel Lewis described the town, in his Topographical Dictionary of Ireland. He wrote that

BALLYSHEEHAN, a parish, in the barony of MIDDLETHIRD, county of TIPPERARY, and province of MUNSTER, 3 miles (N.) from Cashel; containing 3034 inhabitants. It is situated on the mail coach road from Dublin, by way of Cashel, to Cork, and comprises 8678 statute acres, of which 3657 are applotted under the tithe act and valued at £7118 per annum. There are about 150 acres of bog, producing a valuable supply of fuel, and 50 acres of woodland; the remainder is arable and pasture...There is neither church, glebe-house, nor glebe; the members of the Established Church attend divine service at Cashel and Ardmoyle. In the R. C. divisions this parish forms part of the union or district of Boherlahan; the chapel is a neat modern building. There are three pay schools, in which are about 140 boys and 90 girls. Ballytarsney Castle, a lofty square tower, is said to have been built by a person named Hacket, who, according to tradition, was hanged by one of Cromwell's generals, who had gained possession of it by treachery.

What Lewis writes is further confirmed by Ambrose Leet's 1814 book, A Directory to the Market Towns in Ireland, which lists the parish within Tipperary County, with the "post town" as Tipperary. Additionally, other resources expand on the history of the area. Some books show Ballysheehan as sitting within the diocese of Cashel, with a public school in the area, focus on religious matters, burials, testimonies in trials, and much more. By 1841, when the Great Famine hit Ireland, Ballysheehan only had about 1,400 inhabitants.

There is a graveyard in the parish along with a 417-acre farm for racing horses, and a ruined Medieval church, among other attractions. The town of Ballysheehan was also the place where the "Waterford hurling legend," Johnny O'Connor died in November 2010.

Currently, the National Archives of Ireland has digitized old Tithe Appointment Books for the parish, some of which are also listed on other genealogical websites. Not included in the collection are re-creations of that which was destroyed during the 1922 fire at the Public Record Office of Ireland: "2 volumes of Ballysheehan parish registers, comprisng [sic] baptisms 1837-76 and burials 1839-74."

== See also ==
- List of civil parishes of County Tipperary
- List of towns and villages in Ireland
