= Newtown, Holycross =

Townland in County Tipperary, Ireland

Newtown, Eliogarty (Holycross) (Irish: An Baile Nua) is a townland in the Barony of Eliogarty in County Tipperary, Ireland. It is in the civil parish of Holycross. It is one of nineteen townlands known as Newtown in County Tipperary.
