= Curraheen, County Tipperary =

Curraheen, County Tipperary, can refer to

- Curraheen, Carrick on Suir, County Tipperary
- Curraheen, Cashel, County Tipperary
- Curraheen, Clogheen, County Tipperary
- Curraheen, Aghnameadle, Nenagh, County Tipperary
- Curraheen, Killoscully, Nenagh, County Tipperary
- Curraheen, Lisbunny, Nenagh, County Tipperary
- Curraheen, Thurles, County Tipperary
- Curraheen, Tipperary town, County Tipperary
