= Templetouhy (civil parish) =

Tipperary (Irish) parish

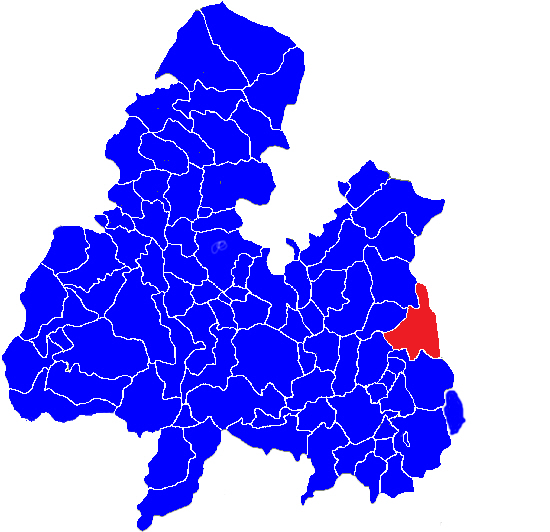
Location of Templetuohy in the civil parishes of north Tipperary

Templetouhy (Irish Teampall Tuaithe), often written Templetuohy, is a civil parish that lies mainly in the barony of Ikerrin, County Tipperary although a single townland lies in the barony of Eliogarty. It is part of the Thurles poor law union. Writing in 1837, Lewis said that the parish of Templetuohy (as he had it, Templetouhy) had 2,653 inhabitants.

== Ecclesiastical parishes ==
Like all civil parishes in Ireland, this civil parish is derived from, and co-extensive with, a pre-existing parish of the Church of Ireland. The living was a rectory, joined with that of Callabeg, in the Diocese of Cashel which was in the gift of the Archbishop. Following the merger of various dioceses in the region, it is now part of the parish of "Templemore, Thurles and Kilfithmone" in the United Dioceses of Cashel and Ossory. In the Roman Catholic Church, it is united to Moyne to form the ecclesiastical parish of "Templetuohy and Moyne" in the Archdiocese of Cashel and Emly.

== Townlands ==
The parish is divided into 13 townlands. The largest population centre is the village of Templetuohy in the townland of Longorchard. The southernmost townland of Derryville lies in the barony of Eliogarty.

Name in Irish	Name in English
An tAbhallort Fada	Longorchard
Baile an Chnocáin	Ballyknockane
Baile Uí Laithí	Ballylahy
Bearna an Lisín	Barnalisheen
Buaile Fhraoigh	Boolaree
Cluain Buach	Clonbuogh
Crannach	Cranagh
Doire Bhile	Derryville
Doire Lochta	Derrylaughta
Lios an Iúir	Lissanure
Lios Duilín agus An Dromainn	Lisdalleen and Drummin
An Tóchar	Togher
Tulach Mhic Shéamais	Tullowmacjames
