= Rathcunikeen =

- Townland
- Location in Ireland
- Coordinates: 52.6592°N 7.7397°W
- Country: Ireland
- Province: Munster
- County: County Tipperary

Rathcunikeen or Rathcumrikeen is a small townland in the civil parish of Ballymurreen, County Tipperary in Ireland. It is an exclave of the parish, as it is surrounded by the neighbouring civil parish of Two-Mile-Borris. Rathcunikeen townland, which is approximately 160 acres (65 ha) in area, had a population of 13 people (in 3 occupied houses) as of the 2011 census.
