= Cabragh, County Tipperary =

Townland in County Tipperary, Ireland

Coordinates: 53°56′N 9°04′W

Cabragh, sometimes written Cabra, is a townland in Fertiana civil parish in County Tipperary, Ireland.
