= Templetuohy =

Village in County Tipperary, Ireland

Templetuohy Teampall Tuaithe (Irish)
- Village
- Location within Ireland
- Coordinates: 52°47′19″N 7°43′18″W
- Country: Ireland
- Province: Munster
- County: County Tipperary

Population (2016)
  - Total: 282
- Time zone: UTC+0 (WET)
  - Summer (DST): UTC-1 (IST (WEST))

Templetuohy (Irish Teampall Tuaithe) is a village in County Tipperary, Ireland. It is situated in the townland of Longorchard in the civil parish of Templetouhy. The local GAA club is Moyne–Templetuohy GAA which is organised by Tipperary GAA. The village is joined to Moyne to form the ecclesiastical parish of Templetuohy and Moyne in the Roman Catholic Archdiocese of Cashel and Emly. It is located on the R502 road, 9 kilometres (6 mi) from Templemore to the west and 12 km (7 mi) from the M8 motorway to the east. According to the 2016 census, the village had a population of 282.
