= Fertiana =

Civil parish in Ireland

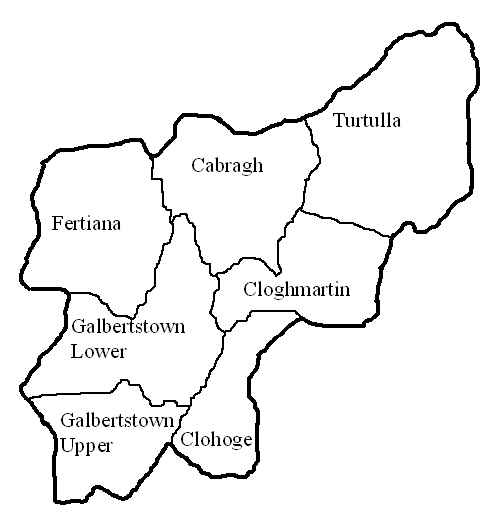
Townlands in Fertiana civil parish

Fertiana is a civil parish in County Tipperary, Ireland. It is part of the historical barony of Eliogarty. It has 3,397 statute acres divided into seven townlands:

- Turtulla
- Cabragh
- Cloghmartin
- Clohoge
- Fertiana
- Galbertstown Lower
- Galbertstown Upper
