= Cloghmartin =

Townland in County Tipperary, Ireland

Coordinates: 52°38′22″N 7°49′15″W

Cloghmartin, sometimes written Cloughmartin, is a townland in Fertiana civil parish in County Tipperary.
