= Fertiana (townland) =

Townland in County Tipperary, Ireland

Fertiana is a townland in the civil parish of the same name in County Tipperary.
