= Ballytarsna, Cashel, County Tipperary =

Townland in County Tipperary, Ireland

Ballytarsna Baile Trasna
- Townland
- Location in Ireland
- Coordinates: 52.58504°N 7.82441°W
- Country: Ireland
- Province: Munster
- County: County Tipperary
- Irish Grid Reference: S119482

Ballytarsna is a townland in County Tipperary in Ireland. Occupying 1190 acres, it is located in the civil parish of Ballysheehan in the barony of Middlethird in the poor law union of Cashel.

There is a townland house, Ballytarsna House, which, in 1850, was occupied by John Max, who held it from the Bunbury estate; at this time, the buildings were valued at £16 and 12 shillings. In 1906 James Grene was resident. The house is still occupied and well maintained.
