= Galbertstown Upper =

Townland in County Tipperary, Ireland

Galbertstown Upper is a townland in Fertiana civil parish in County Tipperary.
