= Galbooly =

Civil parish in County Tipperary, Ireland

Galbooly (Irish: An Ghallbhuaile), also Boly or Galvoly, is a civil parish in County Tipperary, Ireland. It is one of 21 civil parishes in the barony of Eliogarty. It has area of 1,267 acres and is divided into the townlands of Galbooly, Galbooly Little, Shanacloon, Coolkennedy, Newbrook and Knockakilly. As a parish of the Church of Ireland, Galbooly was a vicarage in the Diocese of Cashel and part of the Union of Borrisleigh.
