= Moycarkey =

Moycarky Maigh Chairce
- Village
- Location in Ireland
- Coordinates: 52°37′34″N 7°47′24″W
- Country: Ireland
- Province: Munster
- County: County Tipperary

Moycarkey, officially Moycarky (Irish: Maigh Chairce), is a village in Moycarky townland in the civil parish of Moycarky in County Tipperary, Ireland.

It contains the extensive ruins of Moycarkey Castle. To the west of the castle, there is a Catholic church, St. Peter's, which was built sometime before the first Ordnance Survey in the early 19th century and heavily modernised in the mid-20th century. Beside the church is the parochial house for the Catholic parish of Moycarkey, Littleton, Two-Mile-Borris. To the north of the current church, just across the road, there is an old graveyard and the ruins of an old church; to the north of these ruins, the first Ordnance Survey map showed the remains of what it termed an 'R.C. Chapel (in ruins)'. The modern graveyard, in which the first burial was made around 1958, is located a hundred metres or so to the south of the current church.

== See also ==
- List of towns and villages in Ireland
