= Ballymurreen =

Ballymurreen Baile Amoraoin
- Civil parish
- Location in Ireland
- Coordinates: 52°37′42″N 7°44′54″W
- Country: Ireland
- County: County Tipperary

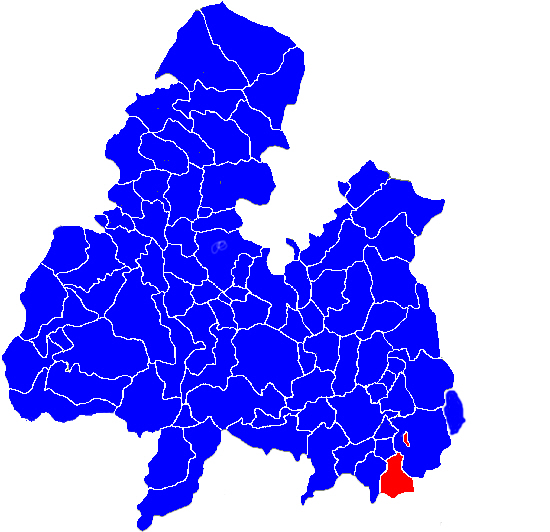
Position of the parish within the civil parishes of North Tipperary

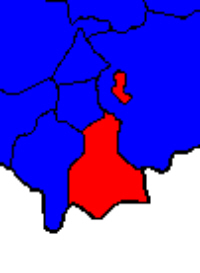
Position of the parish within the parishes of south-eastern North Tipperary, showing the exclave of Rathcunikeen surrounded by Borrisleigh

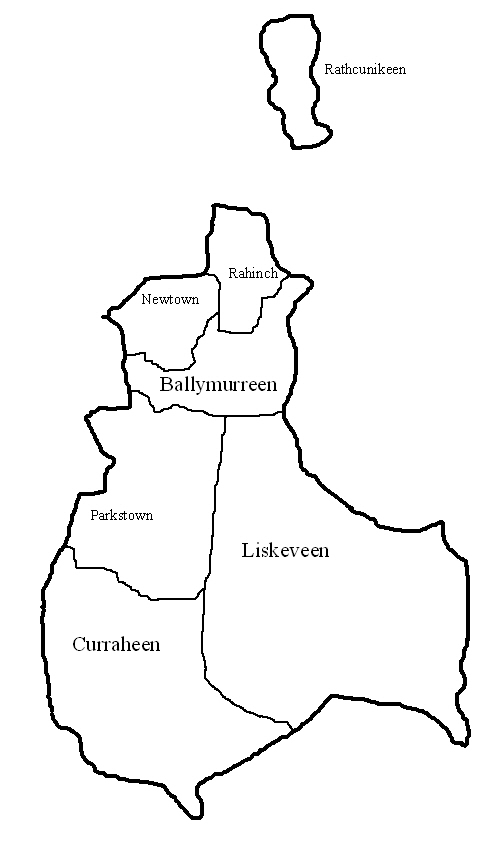
Townlands in Ballymurreen civil parish. Note that Rathcunikeen townland is an exclave which is located within a neighbouring civil parish, Borrisleigh

Ballymurreen (Irish: Baile Amoraoin), also written Ballymoreen, is a civil parish and an electoral division in County Tipperary, Ireland. It is one of 21 civil parishes in the barony of Eliogarty.

As a Church of Ireland parish, it was in the diocese of Cashel. The ruins of a church are still to be seen in Ballymurreen townland, at the junction of a minor road from Holycross with the R639, but there was no parish church in modern times, members of the established church attending services in the neighbouring parish of Borrisleigh, at Littleton which is located between the exclave of Rathcunikeen and the main part of Ballymoreen.

== Electoral division ==
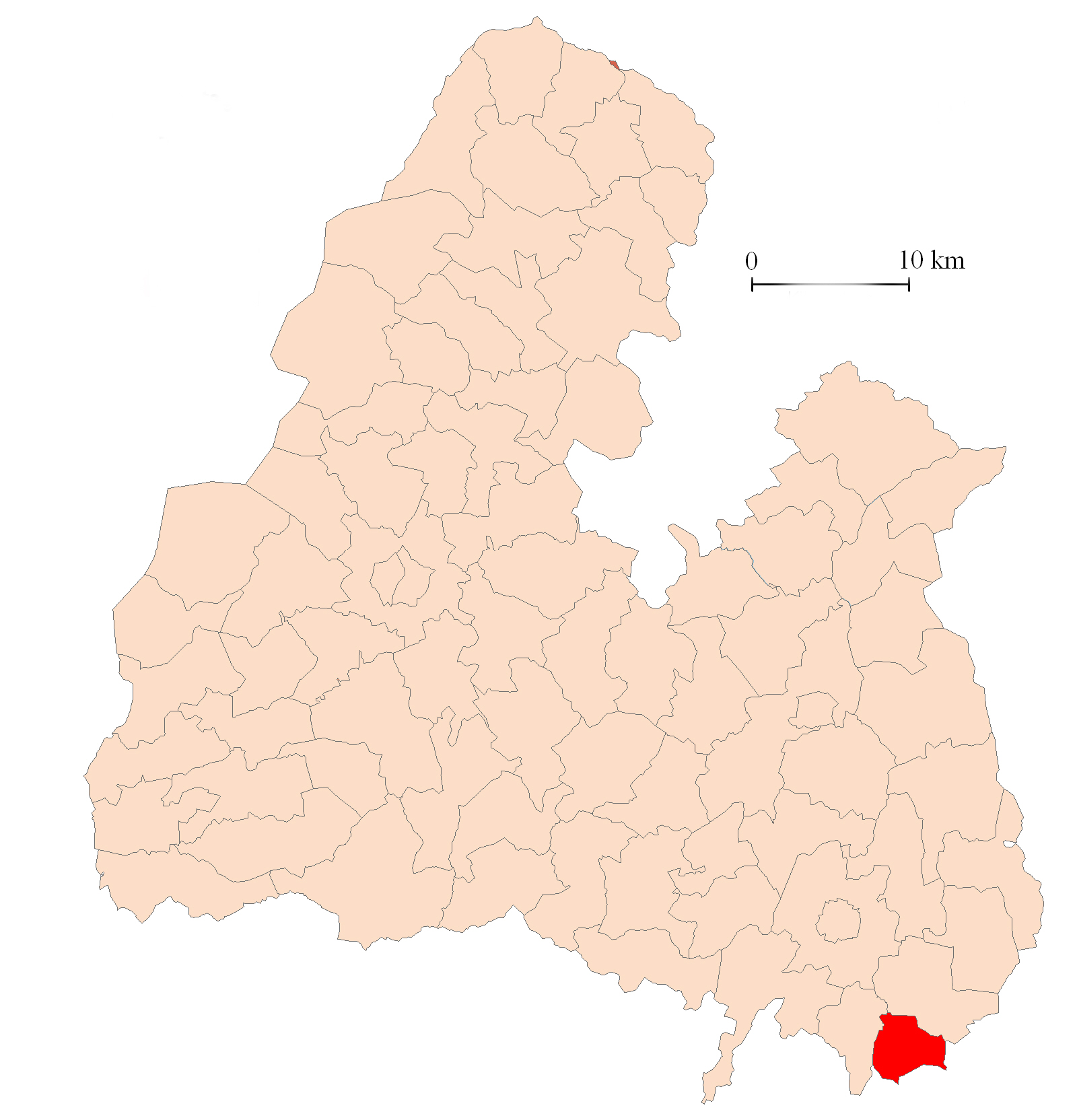
Outline map of North Tipperary, showing the boundaries of Ballymurreen electoral division as they were at the time of the 2011 census

The code number assigned to the electoral division by the Central Statistics Office is 22062.

At the time of both the 1911 census, the division was smaller than the civil parish of the same name, containing just three townlands (Curraheen, Parkstown and Liskeveen) of the seven that belong to the civil parish; the four other townlands from Ballymurreen civil parish belonged to Littleton electoral division.

At the time of the 2011 census, the total population of Ballymurreen electoral division was 254, of which 150 were male and 104 female. There were 103 dwellings, of which 10 were vacant.

== Townlands of the civil parish ==
Ballymurreen contains seven townlands:

- Ballymurreen,
- Curraheen,
- Liskeveen,
- Newtown,
- Parkstown,
- Rahinch and
- Rathcunikeen (which is actually detached from the rest of the parish, forming an enclave within the neighbouring parish of Borrisleigh).

Together they amount to a total of 2870 statute acres; of these about 500 acres are bog and most of the remainder is used for dairying and tillage.

== Castle ==
The site of Ballymurreen Castle, no longer standing, is just across the road from the ruins of the church and graveyard in Ballymurreen townland.

== See also ==
- List of civil parishes of Tipperary
