= Galbertstown Lower =

Townland in County Tipperary, Ireland

Galbertstown Lower is a townland in Fertiana civil parish in County Tipperary.
