= Newtown, Ballymurreen =

Townland in County Tipperary, Ireland

Newtown, Eliogarty (Ballymurreen) is small a townland in the historical barony of Eliogarty in County Tipperary, Ireland. The townland, which is approximately 0.76 km^{2} (0.29 sq mi) in area, is in the civil parish of Ballymurreen.

It is one of 19 townlands known as Newtown (Irish: An Baile Nua) in County Tipperary.
