= Derrynaflan Chalice =

8th- or 9th-century chalice

Coordinates: 52.60159°N 7.72236°W

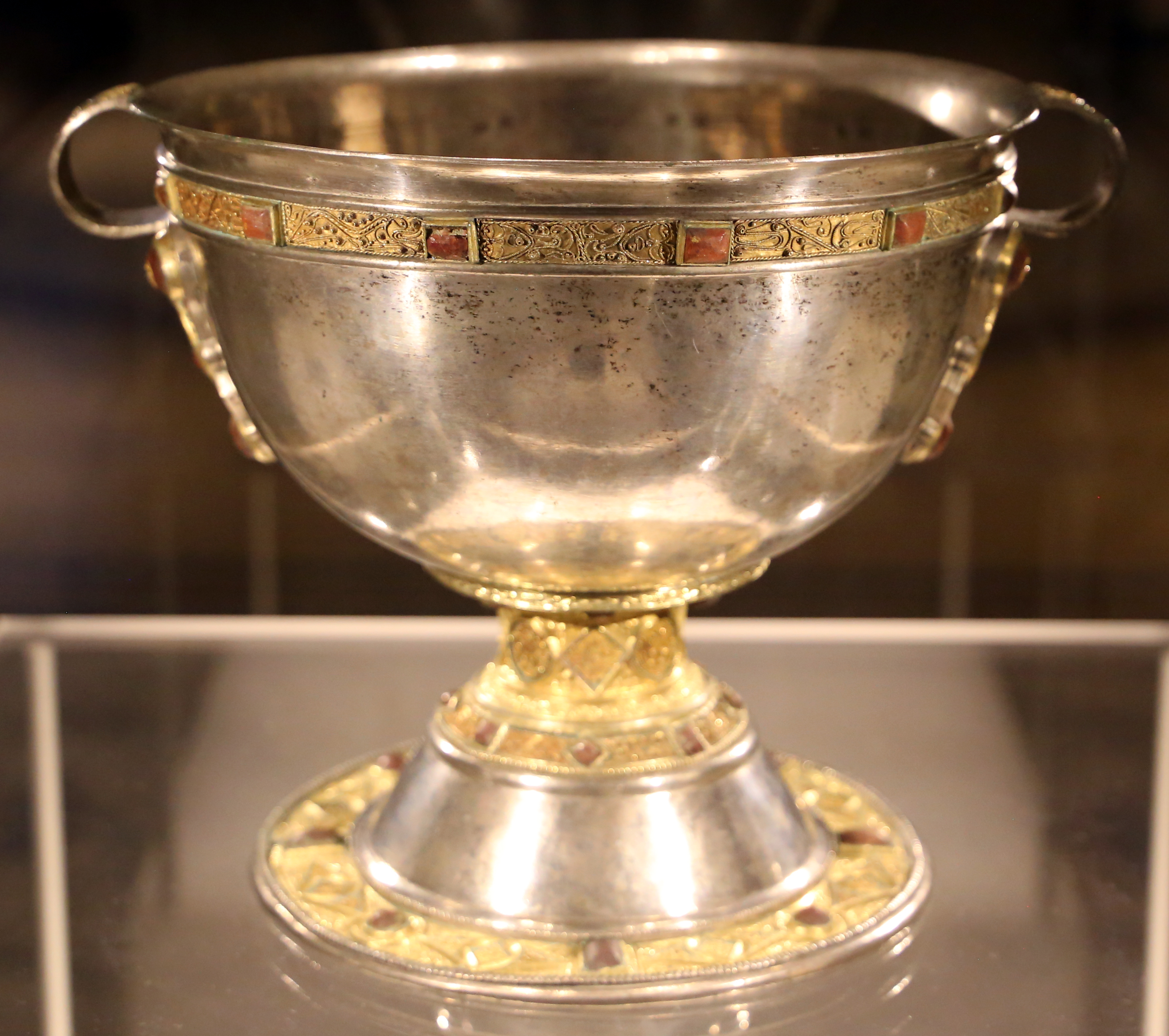
Derrynaflan Chalice

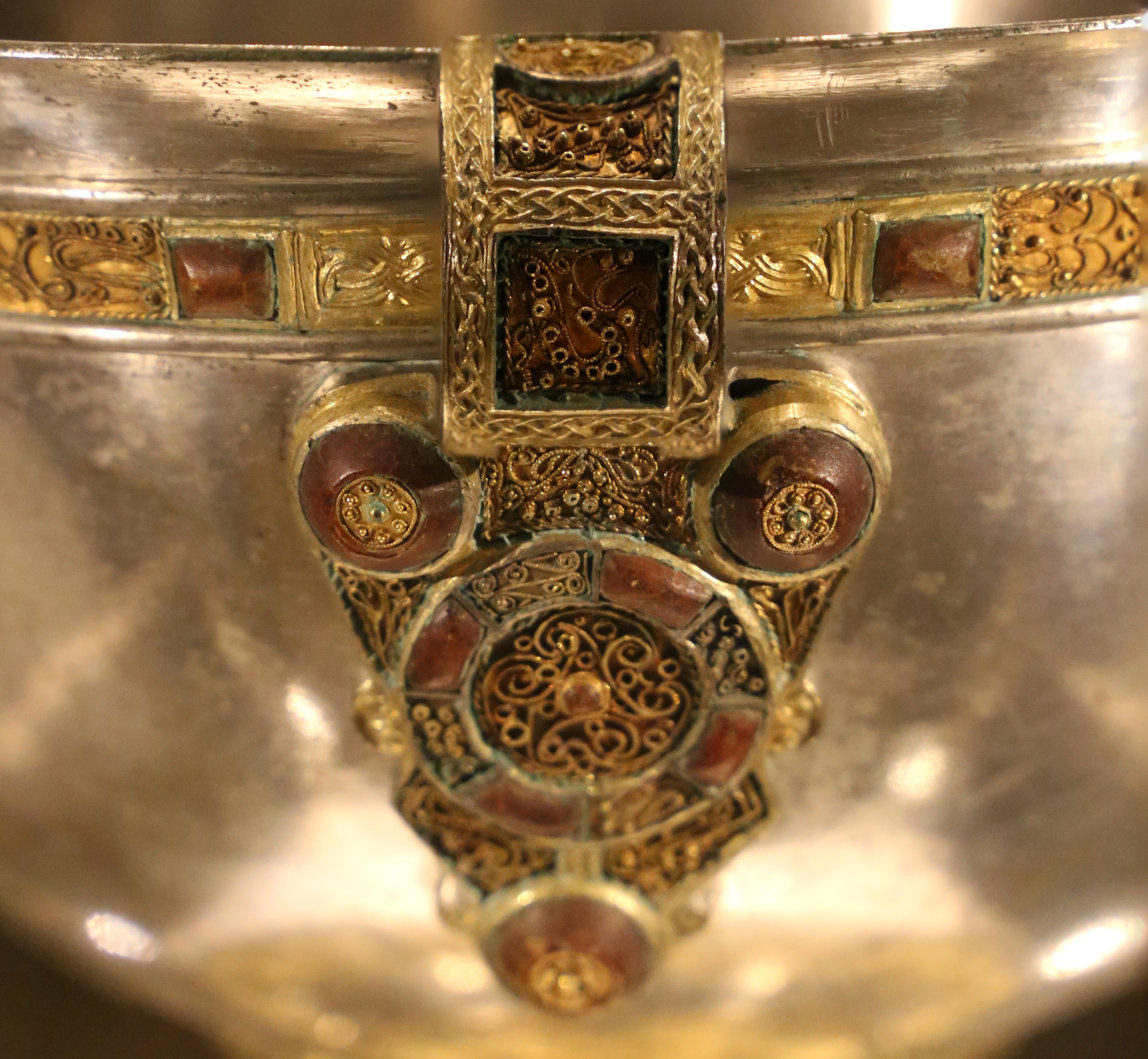
Detail

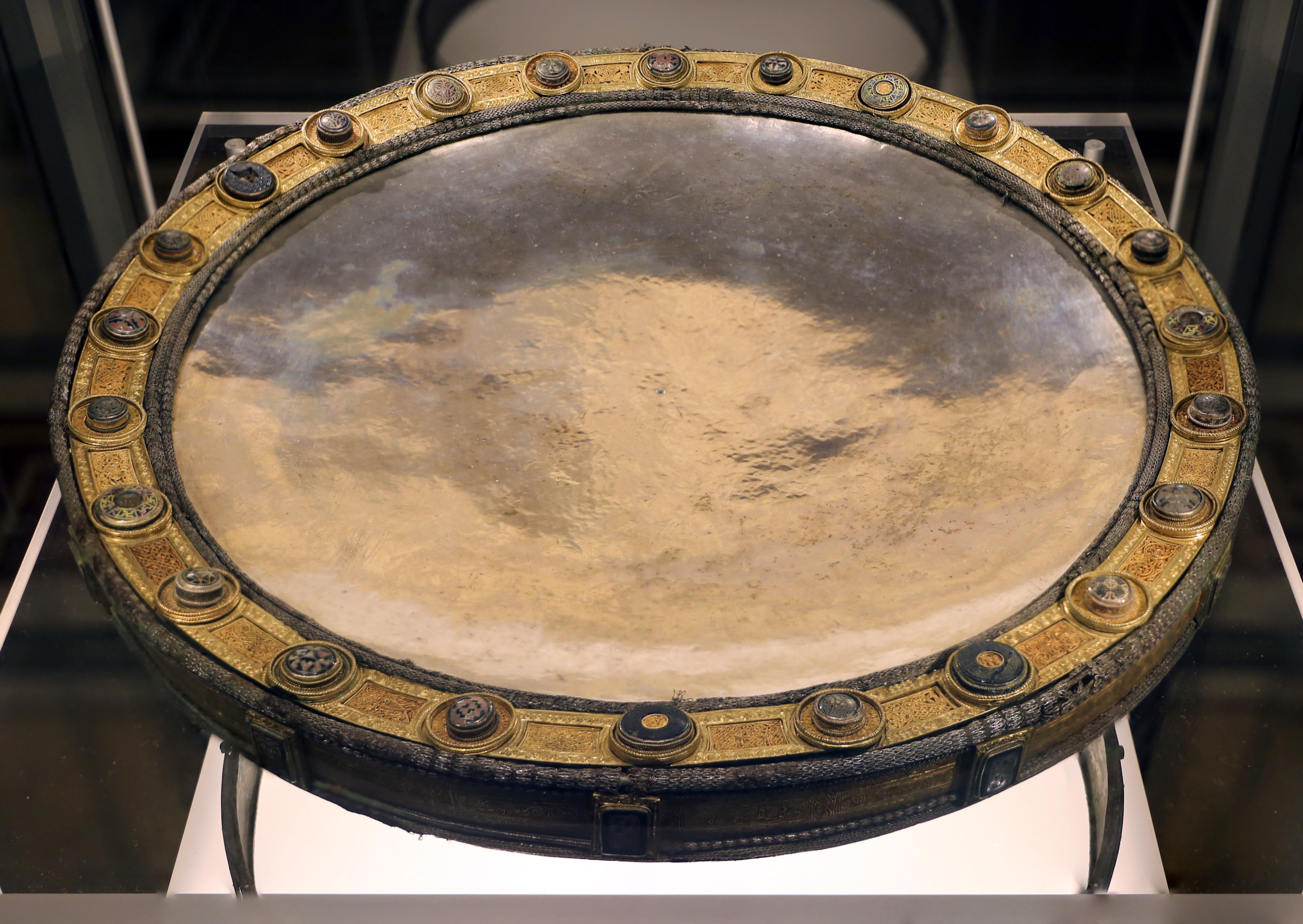
Derrynaflan Paten

The Derrynaflan Chalice is an 8th- or 9th-century chalice that was found as part of the Derrynaflan Hoard of five liturgical vessels. The discovery was made on 17 February 1980 near Killenaule, County Tipperary in Ireland. According to art historian Michael Ryan the hoard "represents the most complex and sumptuous expression of the ecclesiastical art-style of early-medieval Ireland as we know it in its eighth- and ninth-century maturity." The area known as Derrynaflan is an island of pastureland surrounded by bogland, which was the site of an early Irish abbey.

The chalice was found with a composite silver paten, a hoop that may have been a stand for the paten, a liturgical strainer and a bronze basin inverted over the other objects. The group is among the most important surviving examples of Insular metalwork. It was donated to the Irish State and the items are now on display in the National Museum of Ireland.

The hoard was probably secreted during the turbulent 10th to 12th centuries, when Viking raids and dynastic turmoil created many occasions when valuables were hidden. The early and later 10th century is marked by a particular concentration of hoarding in Ireland.

== Discovery ==
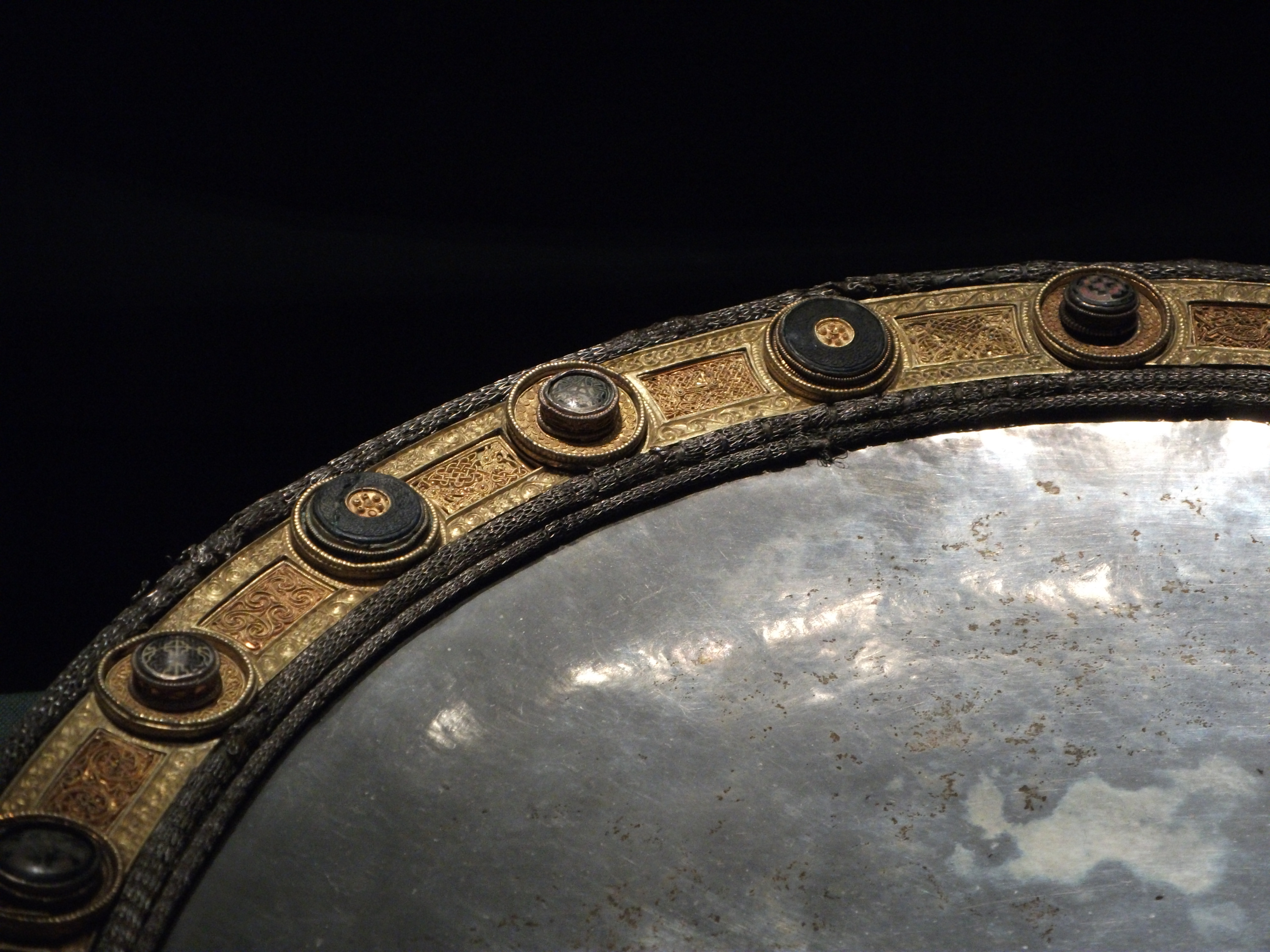
Detail

Derrynaflan is a small island of dry land situated in a surrounding area of peat bogs, in the townland of Lurgoe, County Tipperary, northeast of Cashel. The monastery was an important foundation in the period preceding the Viking raids; the present modest ruins of a small Cistercian nave-and-chancel abbey church there, however, date from a later period.

The Derrynaflan Hoard was discovered on 17 February 1980 by Michael Webb from Clonmel and his son, also Michael, while they were exploring the ancient monastic site of Derrynaflan with a metal detector. They had the implied permission of the owners of the land on which the ruins stood to visit the site but they had no permission to dig on the lands. A preservation order had been made in respect of the ruin under the National Monuments Act, 1930, so that it was an offence to injure or to interfere with the site. The discovery was initially kept secret for three weeks.

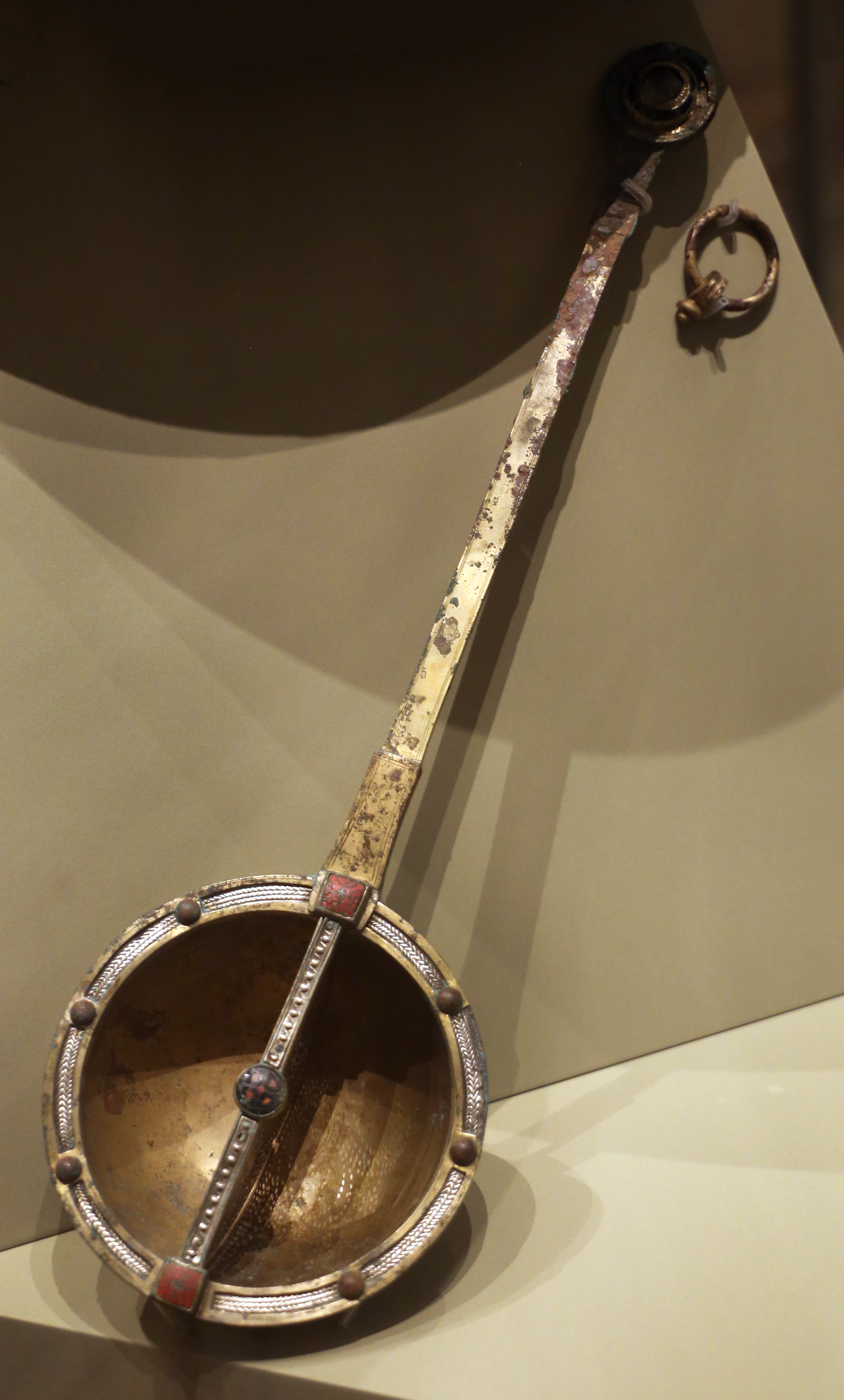
Derrynaflan Strainer

The behaviour of the Webbs, and nearly seven years of litigation, culminated in a Supreme Court action where they unsuccessfully sought over £5,000,000 for the find. This led to the replacement of Irish laws of treasure trove by the law in the National Monuments (Amendment) Act, 1994, with a new Section 2 being included in the legislation.

The Ardagh Chalice dates from around the same period, perhaps a century earlier, of the Derrynaflan Hoard and was found close by in neighbouring County Limerick in the late 19th century. At the time both were made, the ruling dynasty in Tipperary and most of Munster were the Eóganachta, while their longtime allies and possible cousins the Uí Fidgenti ruled in the Limerick area. Feidlimid mac Cremthanin, king-bishop of Cashel, who became King of Munster in 821 and died in 847, was a patron of the monastic foundation at Derrynaflan and has been suggested as a possible patron of the chalice.

As a masterpiece of Insular art, the Derrynaflan chalice was included in the exhibition "The Work of Angels: Masterpieces of Celtic Metalwork, 6th–9th Centuries AD" (London, 1989, included in the catalogue).
