= Moycarky =

Civil parish in County Tipperary, Ireland

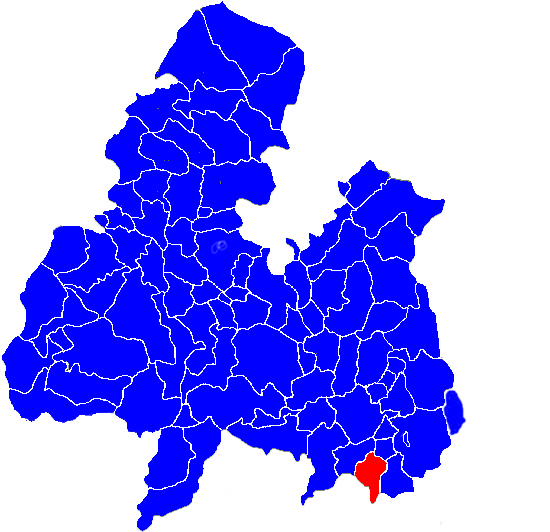
Location of Moycarky in the civil parishes of north Tipperary

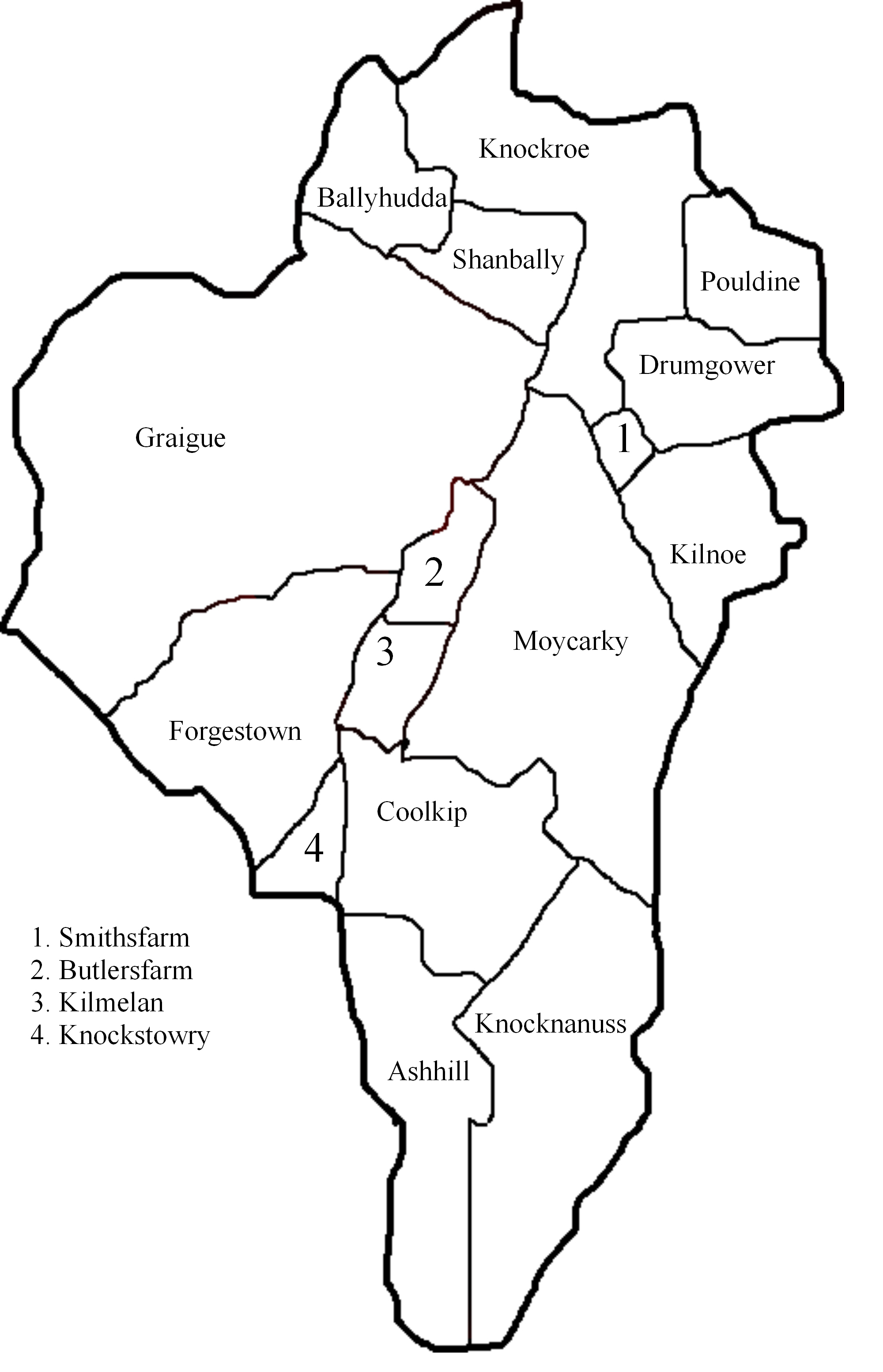
Townlands in the parish

Moycarky or Moycarkey is a civil parish in County Tipperary, Ireland. It is one of 21 civil parishes in the barony of Eliogarty. Partly bounded by the River Suir, it has an area of 3554 statute acres and contains sixteen townlands:

- Ash Hill
- Ballyhudda (sometimes written Ballyhuddy)
- Butlersfarm
- Coolkip
- Drumgower
- Forgestown
- Graigue
- Kilmelan
- Kilnoe
- Knocknanuss
- Knockroe
- Knockstowry
- Moycarky
- Pouldine
- Shanbally
- Smithsfarm

As a parish of the Church of Ireland, it was a rectory and vicarage in the Diocese of Cashel. It formed part of the "Union of Clogher".

There is a relatively modern Catholic church at the hamlet of Moycarkey itself.
