= Eliogarty =

Barony in County Tipperary, Ireland

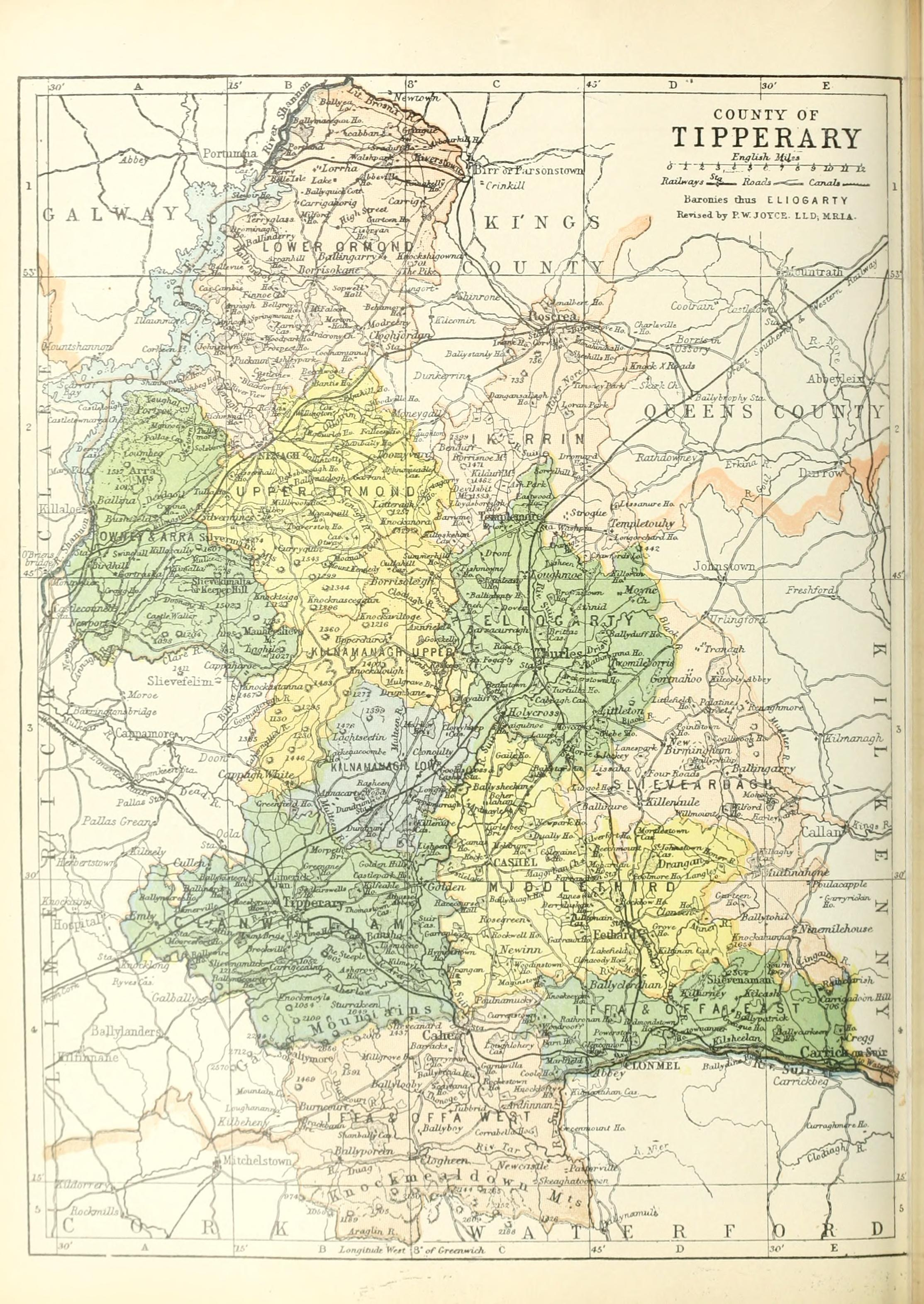
County Tipperary with subdivision into baronies. Eliogarty is in the east.

Eliogarty (Irish: Éile Uí Fhógarta) is a barony in County Tipperary, Ireland. This geographical unit of land is one of 12 baronies in County Tipperary. Its chief town is Thurles. The barony lies between Ikerrin to the north (whose chief town is Roscrea), Kilnamanagh Upper to the west (whose chief town is Borrisoleigh), Middle Third to the south (whose chief town is Cashel) and County Kilkenny to the east. It is currently administered by Tipperary County Council.

== Legal context ==
Baronies were created after the Norman invasion of Ireland as divisions of counties and were used the administration of justice and the raising of revenue. While baronies continue to be officially defined units, they have been administratively obsolete since 1898. However, they continue to be used in land registration and in specification, such as in planning permissions. In many cases, a barony corresponds to an earlier Gaelic túath which had submitted to the Crown. This is probably true in the case of Eliogarty - see History below.

== History ==
=== Ancient history ===
The ancient territory of Éile obtained its name from pre-historic inhabitants called the Eli, about whom little is known beyond what may be gathered from legends and traditions. The extent of Éile varied throughout the centuries with the rise and fall of the tribes in occupation. Before the 5th century A.D. the details of its history which can be gleaned from surviving records and literature are exceedingly meagre, obscure and confusing. During this century however Éile appears to have reached its greatest extent, stretching from Croghan Bri Eli (Croghan Hill in Offaly) to just south of Cashel (in Corca Eathrach Eli). The southern part of this territory embraced the baronies of Eliogarty and Ikerrin, a great part of the modern barony of Middlethird, the territory of Ileagh, and portion of the present barony of Kilnamanagh Upper.

By the 8th century, the territory of Ancient Éile had broken up into a number of petty kingdoms: the O’Carrolls occupied the northern portion, the O’Spillanes held Ileagh (Ileigh) while the Eóganacht Chaisil had annexed Middlethird. The O’Fogartys held what is now the barony of Eliogarty, while to the north of them, at least some time later, were O’Meaghers of Ikerrin. The River Nore, at its position between Roscrea and Templemore, although just a small stream at this point, is usually taken as the southern limit of Ely O'Carroll territory.

=== Cromwellian settlement ===
As the Down Survey was being conducted in the 1650s, the barony had so effectively been cleared of its native population it was found necessary to have some returned from Connaught to clarify to surveyors the extent of properties for distribution to Undertakers.

=== Modern times ===
When County Tipperary was split into North and South Ridings in 1836, Eliogarty was allocated to the north riding. However, the neighbouring barony of Kilnamanagh was split into Upper and Lower half-baronies, being allocated to the north and south ridings respectively. The barony's greatest length, from north to south, is 14.5 miles; its greatest breadth is 10.5 miles; its area is 10,681 acres.

== Towns, villages and townlands in the barony ==
=== Civil parishes ===
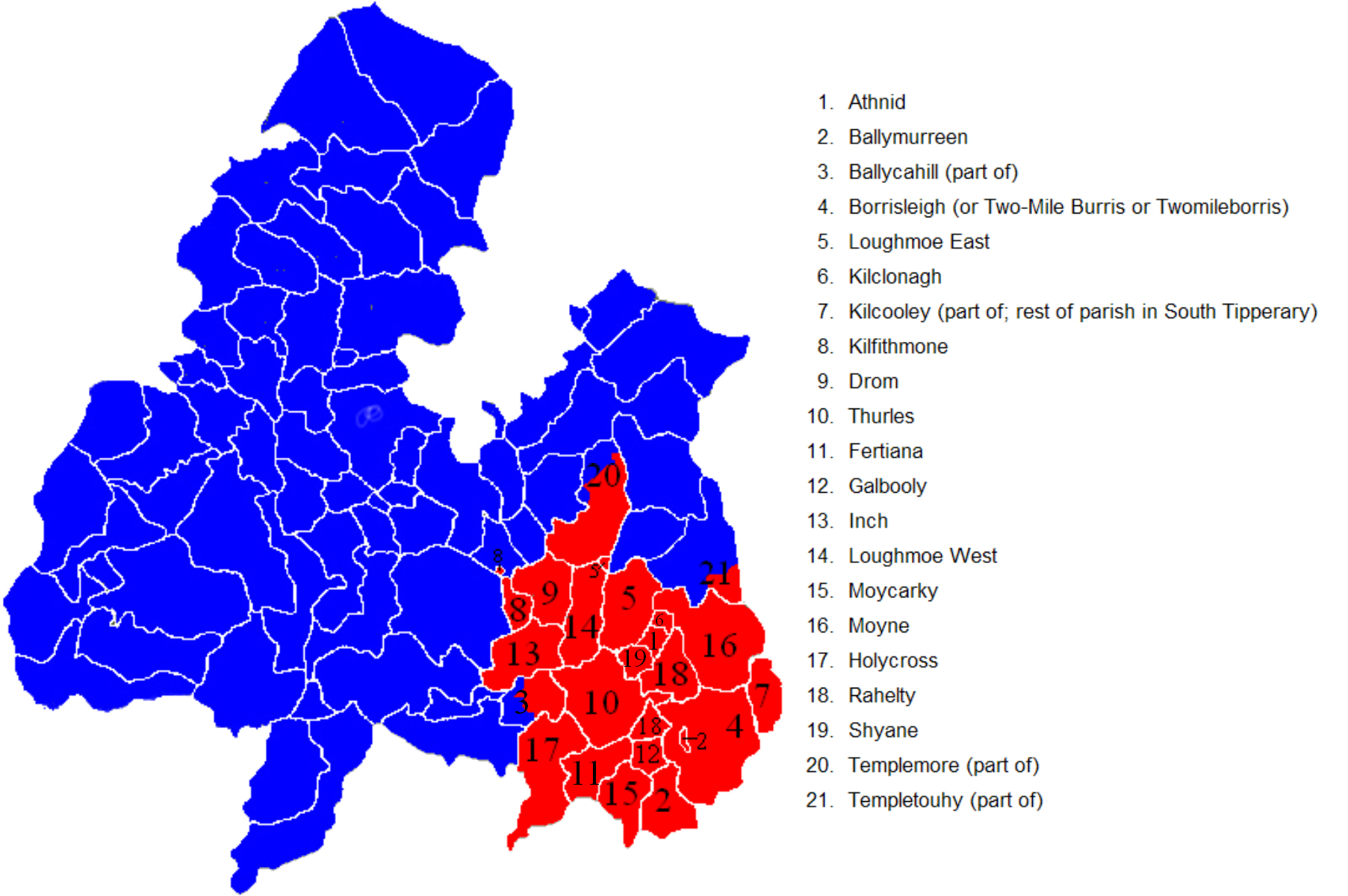
Civil parishes in the barony

The barony contains some or all the townlands of 21 civil parishes. Three parishes (Ballycahill, Templemore, Templetuohy), although fully in North Tipperary, are only partly in the barony. The parish of Kilcooley is partly in North Tipperary and partly in South Tipperary. At the north-western corner of the barony, one townland of the civil parish of Kilfithmone - Coolgort - is almost entirely cut off from the rest of the barony, being sandwiched between the baronies of Ikerrin and Kilnamanagh Upper. The only part of the barony that borders County Kilkenny (to the east) are the townlands of Killoran and Derryfada (in the parish of Moyne) and that of Derryville (in the parish of Templetuohy.

Civil Parish Irish Name	Civil Parish English Name
Áth Nid	Athnid
Baile Amoraoin	Ballymoreen
Bealach Achaille	Ballycahill
Buiríos Léith	Twomileborris
Na Cealla Beaga	Loughmoe East
Cill Chluaine	Kilclonagh
Cill Chúile	Kilcooley
Cill Fhia Múin	Kilfithmone
An Drom	Drom
Durlas	Thurles
Feart Éanna	Fertiana
An Ghallbhuaile	Galbooly
An Inse	Inch
Luachma	Loughmoe West
Maigh Chairce	Moycarky
An Mhaighean	Moyne
Mainistir na Croiche	Holycross
Ráth Eilte	Rahelty
An Sián	Shyane
An Teampall Mór	Templemore
Teampall Tuaithe	Templetouhy

=== Townlands and villages ===
Townland	in the civil parish of
Ballymoreen (townland),	Ballymoreen (civil parish)
Dovea, County Tipperary	
Bouladuff	Inch
Castleiney	
Loughmore	
Horse and Jockey	
Kilclonagh	
Littleton	
Moyne	

== See also ==
- List of civil parishes of County Tipperary
