= Loughmoe (disambiguation) =

Loughmoe may refer to

- Loughmore, statutory spelling Loughmoe, village in County Tipperary, Ireland
- Loughmoe Castle, beside the village
- Baron of Loughmoe, feudal title of the castle owner
- Loughmoe West, civil parish containing the village
- Loughmoe East, civil parish across the River Suir from Loughmoe West
