= Hugh Purcell of Loughmoe =

Founder of the Lordship and Barony of Loughmoe

The arms of the Baron of Loughmoe

Sir Hugh Purcell of Loughmoe was the founder of the Lordship and Barony of Loughmoe, as well as being the builder of a fragment of Loughmoe castle. He was married to Beatrix FitzWalter, who was the daughter of Theobald FitzWalter. He is known for being the first Lord of Loughmoe.

== Ancestry ==
=== Patriarchal ===
Sir Hugh Purcell of Loughmoe's ancestors, most probably patriarchal, derive from another Sir Hugh Purcell, a knight who as John O'hart notes, and as the family believed, participated in William the Conqueror's Norman invasion of England in 1066. He was credited with being the first Norman to sail the English Channel and reach Pevensey Bay, supposedly the first Norman to prove himself worthy by storming the ruins of an old Roman castle, which Harold Godwinson's soldiers were holding, and the first to be formally recognized by William, after his success, and be allotted land by the new king.

The elder Hugh Purcell had two sons, by the name of Dyno and Oyno or Oyn. Dyno was the keeper of the bedchamber to the king, which perhaps signals strong friendship or alliances between the Purcell and the Royal family. Oyno, although his brother had a considerably important position, inherited his father's legacy, and was awarded a Manor in Cattleshell, Surry, by King Henry I. These events unfolded at around 1120, with no specific date found. Oyno married the daughter of Nigel de Broc, of who was fairly known at the time.

His son's name varies from the following (because although he preferred to be known by his mother's prestigious name, it was still more common for people to have their father's): Ralph de Broc, Ralph Purcell, Randulf de Broc and Randulf Purcell. He was unfortunately drawn in to the famous assassination of the Bishop Thomas Becket, who, after the king said, "Will nobody rid me of this turbulent priest?" was murdered on Holy ground by knights. Randulf had one of his estates, Saltwood by name, confiscated by the king because the knights received hospitality in his castle before the murder.

Randulf's nephew had the name of Robert Purcell, who was an administrator of justice, often mentioned in the public records.

One of Robert's sons, also Hugh Purcell, participated in the Norman invasion of Ireland, in 1171, where he may have been killed. O'hart claims that this Hugh Purcell was the unnamed knight mentioned by Giraldus Cambrensis, who states, "on the morrow, seeking to cross the river in one of the native boats to hold parley with the King, the boatmen rose upon him in the middle of the stream, stabbed him with their long skeans and the threw the body into the river."

This Hugh Purcell's sons were Walter Purcell and Hugh Purcell of Loughmoe.

=== Matriarchal ===
Sir Hugh Purcell's matriarchal ancestors have noble blood, however illegitimate. To support this claim, Hugh Purcell's (of Loughmoe) tomb had a statue of a man in armour, or so our 17th century sources tell us, with a shield on his left arm. Painted across this are three lions - of course, the symbol of Richard the Lionheart or Richard I. This gives the claim that his mother was an illegitimate daughter of Richard the Lionheart more support. Since, in this section of the article, we are tracing back the matriarchal ancestors of Hugh, we will stay on Richard's line of matriarchal ancestry. It goes as the following.

Dangereuse de L' Isle Bouchard was the earliest known matriarchal ancestor of Richard, who spanned from 1079 - 1151. Her daughter was Aénor de Châtellerault, who lives a relatively short life: 1103 - 1130. Her daughter was Eleanor of Aquitaine, who was arguably one of the most prominent women of her time, for she was the queen consort of France.

Eleanor's son was Richard the Lionheart, and the rest of the ancestry to Hugh has already been covered. Richard participated in the third crusade, scoring considerable victories (following the departure of Phillip Augustus) against the famous Muslim commander Saladin. He is one of the only kings of England remembered by his epithet, not his number, and remains a prominent and influential icon in medieval history. He was mortally wounded and killed by a stray arrow while besieging Châlus in France.

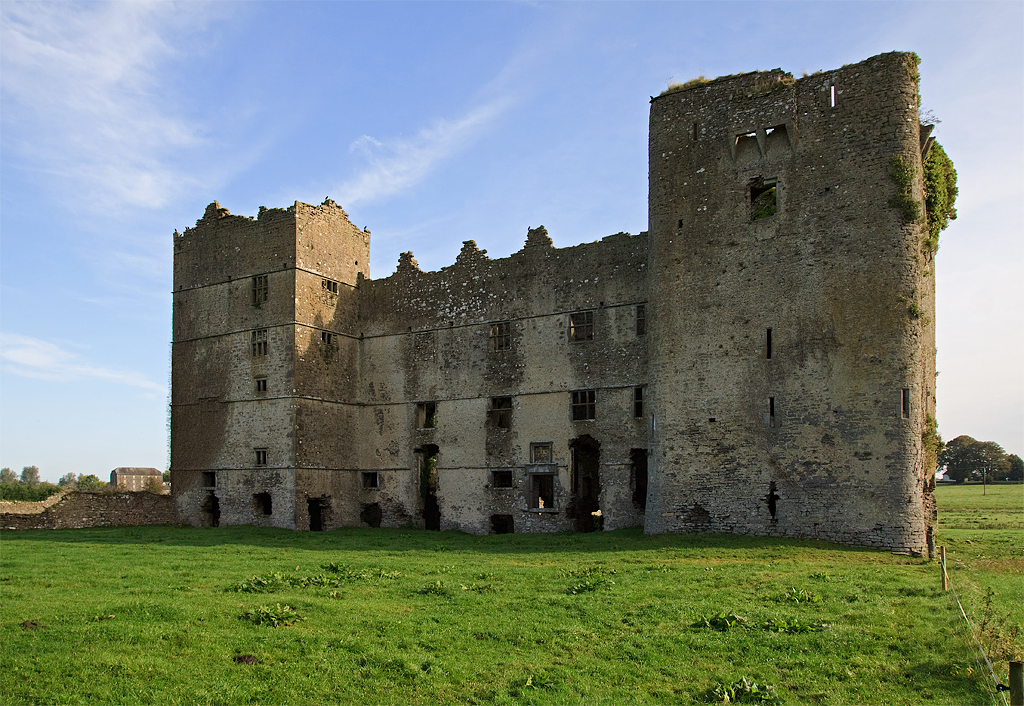
Loughmoe castle, as seen from the South-West. The closest tower is the one of which was constructed by Hugh.

== Marriage to Beatrix FitzWalter ==
Hugh Purcell married the daughter of Theobald FitzWalter, Beatrix FitzWalter. As part of the marriage, Hugh received a dowry from Theobald, consisting of a town by the name of Loughmoe in Tipperary. Here, Hugh constructed a castle, Loughmoe castle. Beatrix had a previous husband; Thomas de Hereford or Thomas de Hungerford. According to O'hart, Beatrix was only a child when Thomas died, "thus the heiress to a splendid inheritance". Theobald was the cup bearer to King Henry II.

== Loughmoe castle under Hugh Purcell ==
Hugh only built one of the towers. Hugh's contribution to the castle was well-constructed and built in a defensive style. As can be seen in the image, the two later additions have sharp corners and wide windows, while the prior tower has rounded corners, making it less vulnerable to cannon and artillery fire.

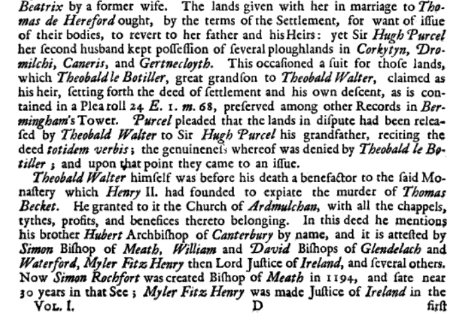
The passage in "An history of the life of James, Duke of Ormonde" describing the Purcell/Botiller land dispute

== Cause of the later Purcell/Botiller dispute of land ==
Beatrix had lands given to her by her previous husband Thomas de Hereford, but Hugh Purcell kept much of the lands as Thomas de Hereford died without issue. Therefore, there was a large dispute over it later by Hugh's grandson and Thomas le Botiller, the grandson of Theobald FitzWalter, who claimed it to be his. Purcell pleaded that Botiller's grandfather had been given to Hugh, and recited the totidem verbis:

"In so many words; in these few words."

Of which was denied by Botiller, who claimed the land.

== Mentions of Hugh Purcell in Church records ==
Hugh Purcell has multiple mentions in the Register of the Abbey of Saint Thomas, Dublin. In CLXXVII of Register of the Abbey of Saint Thomas, Dublin, Hugh Purcell gave a Grant to the Church. The original Medieval Latin version goes like this,

"Universis Christi fidelibus presentes litteras inspecturis Hugo Purcel salutem:

Noverit universitas vestra me, divine pietatis intuitu, pro salute anime mee, patris mei, et matris mee, et Beatricis, sponse me, et liberorum meorum, consisse et quietum clamasse, Deo et ecclessia de Kildroch.

Et ut mea quitea clamacio firmitatem obtineat, sigillum Thome Purcel, commilitonis mei, presenti scripto, quia proprium sigillum meum in partibu Dublinie non habui curam apponere.

Hiis testibus: Waltero Purcel, patre meo; Thoma Purcel; Milone de Rocheford; Ricardo de Midia, clerico."

The English translation of this is,

"All trustworthy Christians salute and examine the present grant of Hugh Purcell:

Know that I, divine piety, for the salvation of my soul, my father, my mother, and Beatrix my fiance, and my book, concise and tranquil, God and the Church of Kildroch.

And in order to prevent a discharge of my stability, the present script is sealed by Thomas Purcell, my comrade, and my own seal and parts of Dublin did not have to take the trouble.

The witness: Walter Purcell, my father; Thomas Purcell; Milon of Rocheford, Richard of Midia, clerk."

== Hugh's heir ==
Richard Purcell, Hugh's heir, was the first Baron of Loughmoe. He was either Hugh's son or grandson, as we do not know what "direct descendant" refers to.

== Sources and further reading ==
- Giraldus Cambrensis, The history and topography of Ireland
- John D'alton, King James' Irish army list
- John Gillingham, Richard I
- John O'hart, The Irish and Anglo-Irish landed gentry
- John O'hart, Irish pedigrees
