= Baron of Loughmoe =

Feudal barony in County Tipperary, Ireland

The Baron of Loughmoe's arms. Aut vincam aut perium is Latin for "either win or perish".

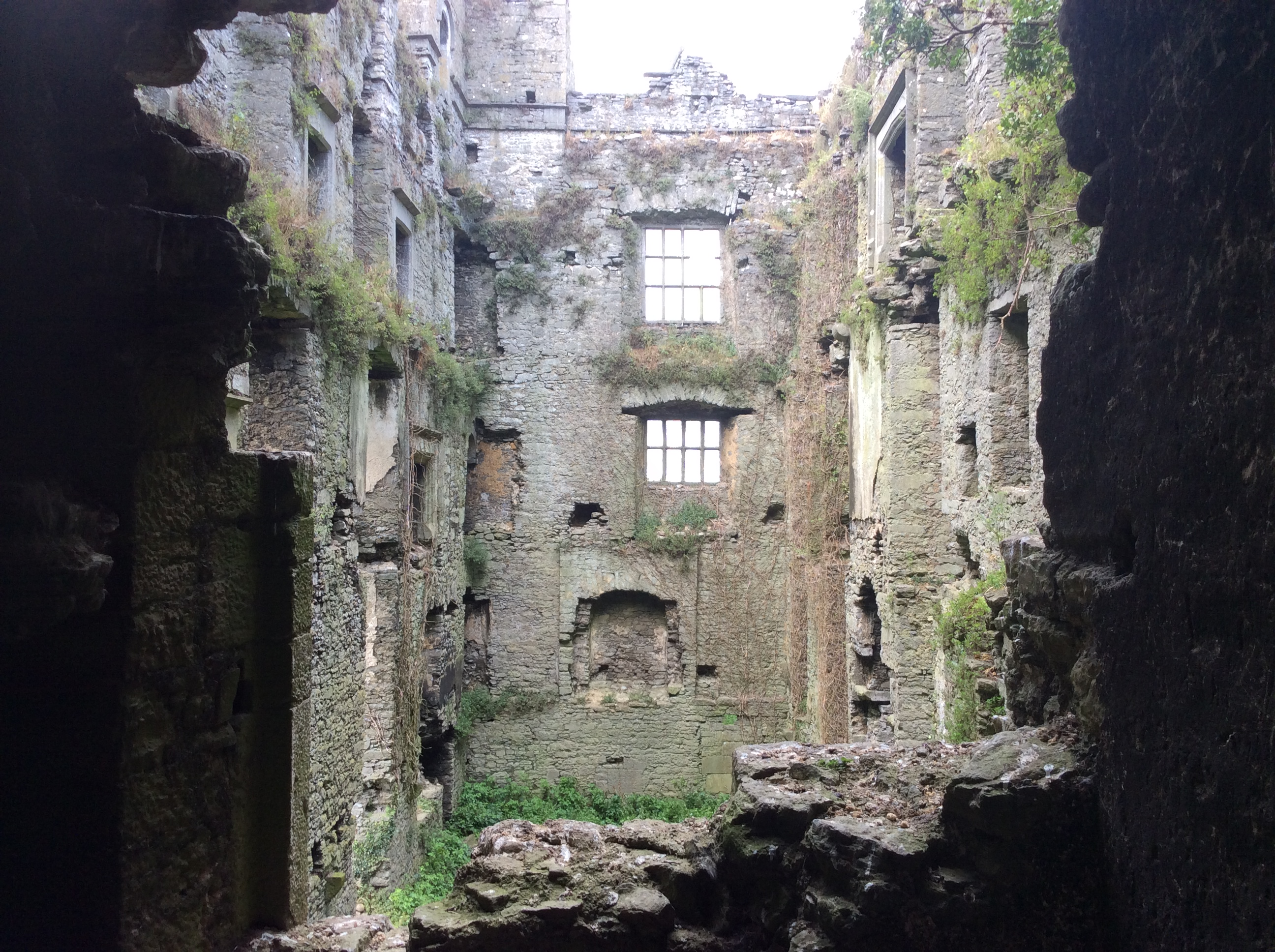
The castle interior seen from the south.

The title Baron of Loughmoe is an Irish feudal barony located in northern County Tipperary, Ireland. It was first held by Richard Purcell; the lands and castle were actually secured by Hugh Purcell of Loughmoe, first lord of Loughmoe. According to Melville Henry Massue, "Marquis de Ruvigny", the title was possibly raised to a Jacobite peerage in 1690 by James II in exile. The feudal title was granted to Richard Purcell in 1328 by James Butler, 1st Earl of Ormond as palatine Lord of Tipperary. Irish and Scottish feudal titles, particularly those granted by palatine lords, are difficult to classify in law, they are acknowledged as genuine hereditaments by the arms granting bodies of Ireland, Scotland, and England, and were never formally recognized by the Crown.

The seat of the Baron of Loughmoe is Loughmoe Castle at Loughmore village, Templemore, County Tipperary.

== History ==
The earliest documented Purcell is the Norman Hugh Purcell, who, in 1035 AD, granted the tithes of Montmarquet, a vill on the frontiers of Picardy, and near Aumerle, to the Abbey of Aumerle. The successor of Sir Hugh Purcell was Dyno Purcell, who in about 1120, received a grant of the manor of Catteshull, Surrey, from King Henry I. Catteshull is a manor and tithing the north-east of Godalming (Surrey), and included lands in Chiddingfold. Øyno married a daughter of Nigel de Broc, a famous Justiciar of the time. In 1129–30, his elder son Geoffrey, the King's usher (hostiarius), paid his relief for his father's land and held it free of toll as it had been in his father's time, and gave it to Reading Abbey on becoming a monk there. This gift was confirmed both by the Empress Maud and by her opponent Stephen. No mention is made of Catteshull in the confirmatory grants of Henry II to Reading Abbey, and he seems to have regranted it to Ralph de Broc, son of Øyno Purcell (identical with Ralph Purcell), to hold by the service of usher of the king's chamber.

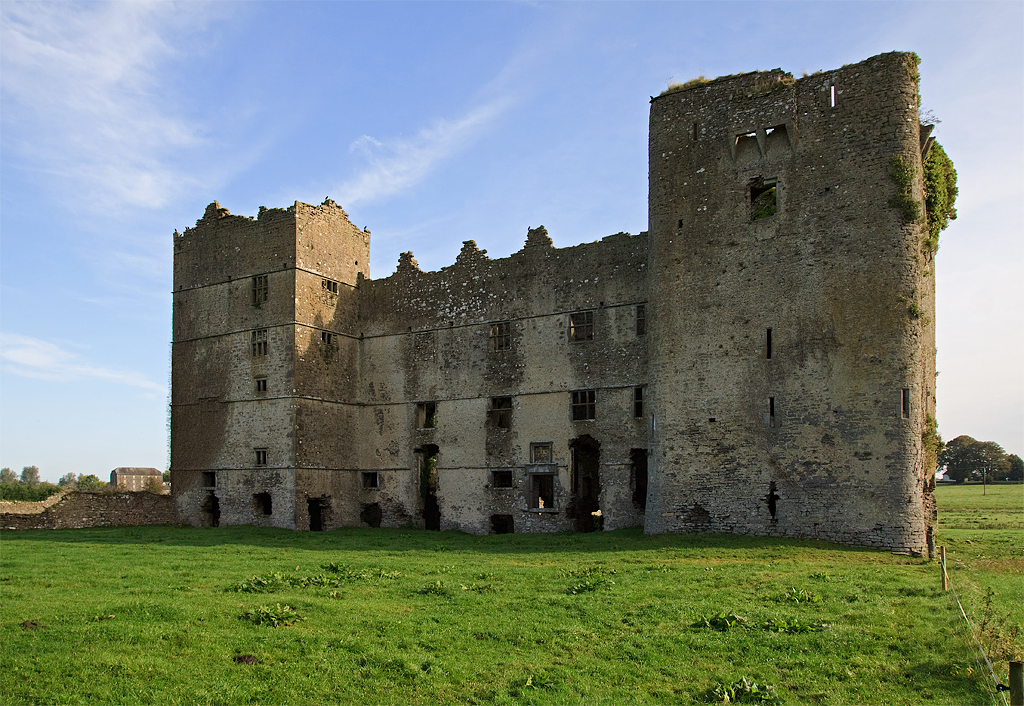
The outside of the castle, as seen from the West. However, in reality, this would have been the castle facing backwards, as the Royal Society of Antiquaries in Ireland note that the entrance was indeed on the East.

Geoffrey's brother and heir, Ranulf, assumed his mother's name of De Broc apparently in 1156, as the Pipe Roll of that year for Hampshire he is styled De Broc and for Surrey he is still called Purcell.

Dyno's son, Ranulf Purcell, took his mother's name, de Broc, and was implicated in the assassination of Thomas Becket. Ranulf was excommunicated for theft of property of the Archbishopric by Becket, on Christmas Day, 1170, the traditional day of forgiveness. When Henry II, who was in Normandy, heard of this, he is said to have asked why none of his knights had rid him of "this troublesome priest". A few days later, four knights arrived at Saltwood, Ranulf de Broc's castle in Kent. After the murder, Saltwood was confiscated by Henry for De Broc's involvement in the murder. De Broc argued that the knights had lied to him and said Henry had ordered Becket be arrested.

Just as Randulf de Broc had no male issue, neither had his nephew Robert, who as Justiciar is frequently mentioned in the public Records; Robert came to be represented by the De Lodges' and the Peto's.

The Purcell male representation then passed to the family of the lords of Newton-Purcell Oxon., and Shareshull, Staffordshire. Ralph, the founder of this line, inherited those manors and others in Normandy, near Rouen, together with the Court Office, viz.: Usher of the King's Chamber, as well as his maternal uncle Robert Burnell's Court Office of Usher, who was living in 1129–30 and enjoyed the Royal favour shown by the remission of the Dane-Geld. About 1154, a charter of confirmation of his uncle's lands and office passed attested, among others, by St. Thomas a Beckett, the Chancellor. About 1160 he made a grant of land in Normandy to the Abbey of the Holy Trinity, Rouen. He must have lived to a great age, as he obtained another confirmation under the payment from King John A.D. 1200. He was the Patriarch of a numerous tribe in England and Ireland; one of his sons being Hugh, who took part in the English Invasion of Ireland in 1171 and became the founder of the House of Purcell in that country.

=== Norman invasion of Ireland 1171 AD ===
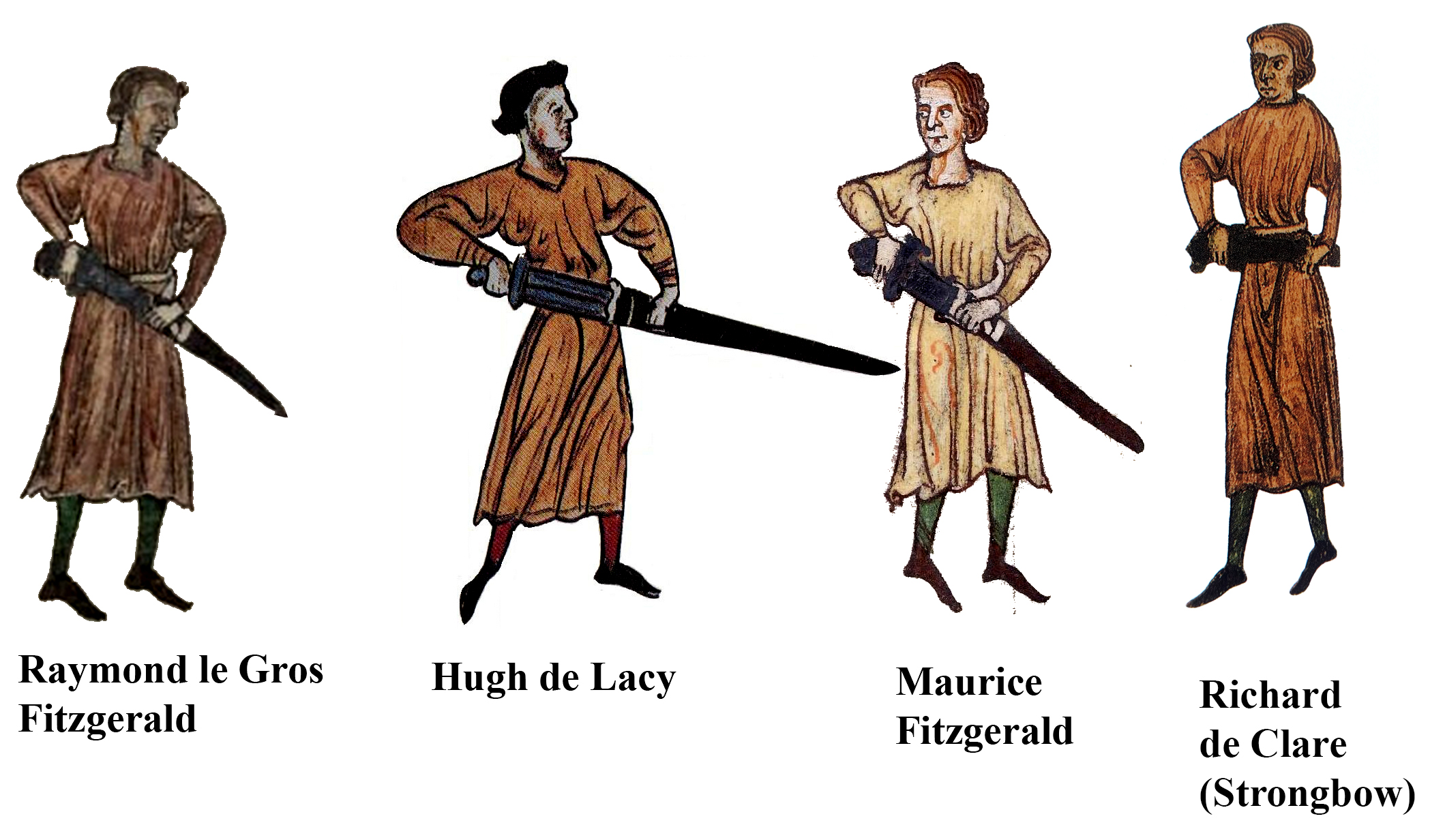
Leaders of the Norman invasion of Ireland, depicted by Giraldus Cambrensis in his Expugnatio Hibernica.

According to O'Hart, this Hugh was the unnamed knight mentioned by Giraldus Cambrensis, as slain at Waterford. Hugh had been left in command of Waterford while the King departed for Dublin,

..."on the morrow, seeking to cross the river in one of the native boats to hold parley with the King, the boatmen rose upon him in the middle of the stream, stabbed him with their long 'skeans' and the threw the body into the river."

In 1171 Sir Hugh Purcell was a knight who participated in the Norman invasion of Ireland, and around 1204 his grandson Sir Hugh married Beatrix, daughter of Theobald FitzWalter, Chief Butler of Ireland. As part of his marriage, Hugh received from FitzWalter, the town of Loughmoe. Sir Hugh founded, in 1241, a Monastery of Franciscans or Grey Friars in Waterford. Hugh's tomb is described by 17th century sources as having on it, the figure of a man in armour, in high relief, with a shield on his left arm, on which were three lions passant guardant in pale. The crest of course is that of the Plantagenets.

== Castle ==
Southern tower

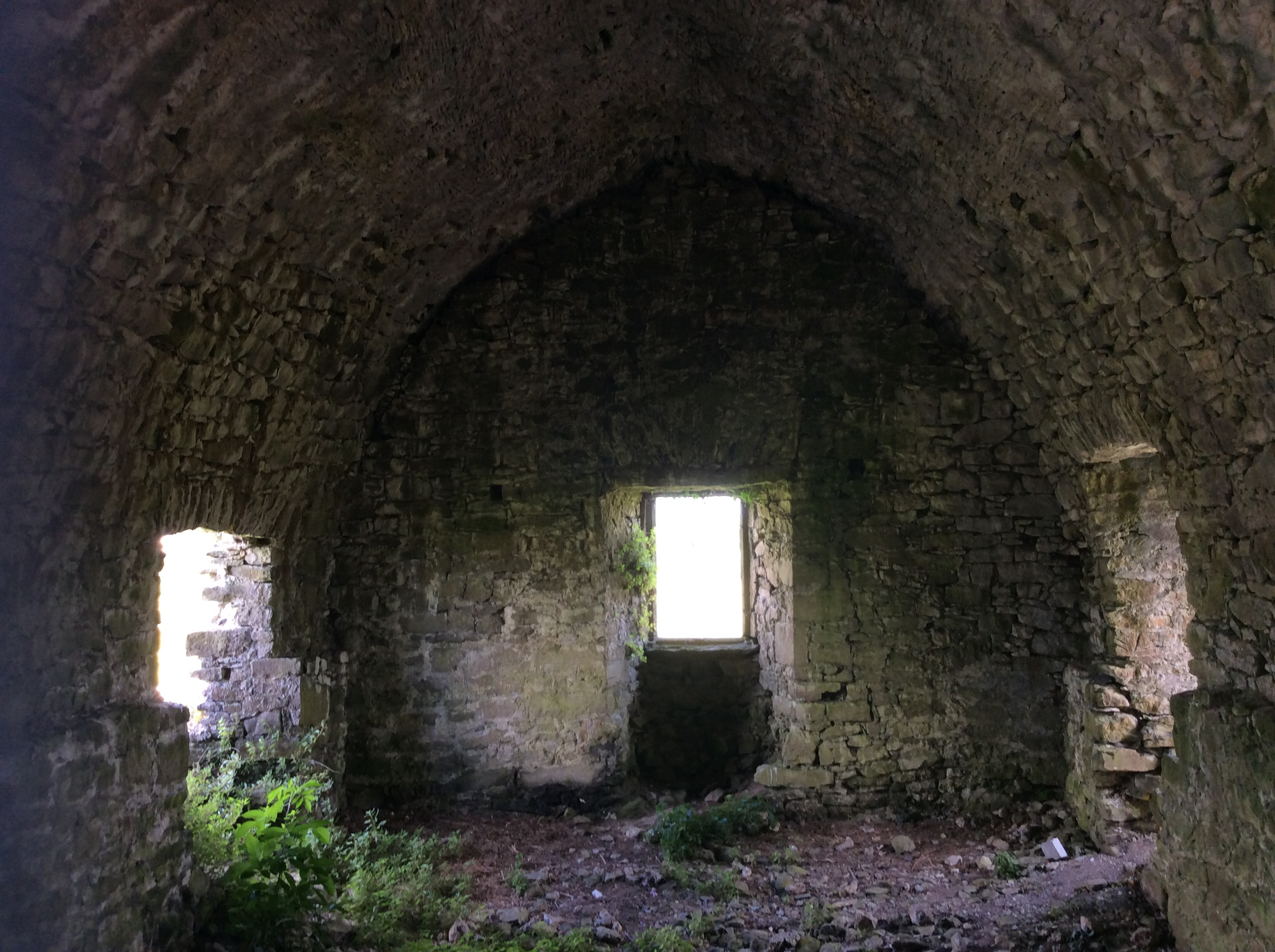
The first floor of the 13th Century tower.

The southern tower was built much earlier than the remainder and includes arrow holes, murder holes, spiral staircases and rounded corners. There are still staircases and different floors remaining in the old, 13th-century tower. However, the remainder, built sometime later, is now in ruins.

== List of the Barons of Loughmoe ==
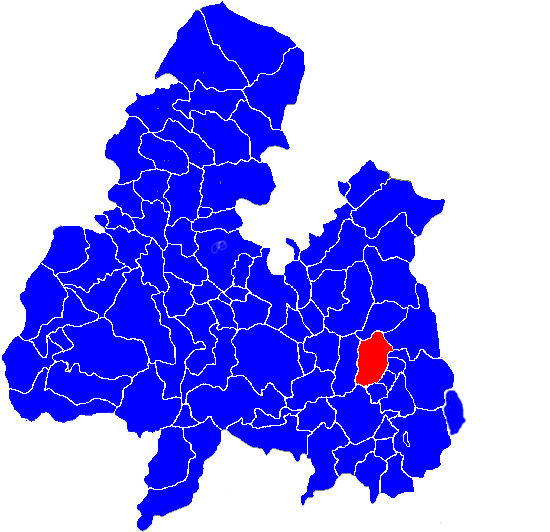
Location of the seat of the Barony of Loughmoe. East Loughmoe, county Tipperary, Rep. Ireland.

The following in an incomplete list of those who have held the title of Lord or Baron of Loughmoe:

Lord of Loughmoe

- Sir Hugh Purcell

Baron of Loughmoe

- Richard Purcell, 1st Baron of Loughmoe (1328)
- Phillip Purcell of Loughmoe
- Geoffrey Rothe Purcell of Loughmoe (c.1397)
- Thomas Purcell of Loughmoe (c.1430)
- Peter Purcell of Loughmoe – on 13 August 1461, he was granted by Edward IV a life annuity of 10l from the lordship of Waghterard in Ireland, former title of James, Earl of Ormonde, and afterwards of James, Earl of Wiltshire
- James Purcell of Loughmoe (c.1456) – "The elegy of James Purcell of Loughmoe" written for him describes something of the turbulence of the period and the Purcell attacks against such neighboring families as the O'Meaghers of Ikerrin, the O'Kennedy's of Ormond and the Hacketts of Middlethird.
- John Purcell of Loughmoe (c.1466)
- Thomas Purcell of Loughmoe (c.1518)
- Patrick Purcell of Loughmoe (c.1534)
- Thomas Purcell of Loughmoe (b.1538 d. 3 August 1607), married Joanna Fitzpatrick (b. 1542 – d. 1611)
- Ralph Purcell of Loughmoe, died without issue, succeeded by his brother
- Richard Purcell of Loughmoe (d. 15 September 1624), married Mary Pluncket of Killahara. In 1607 Richard was tried and found guilty for the manslaughter of his brother-in-law, Adam Tobin, while the latter was High Sheriff of the County of Tipperary in 1606. Richard was the father of
- Theobald Purcell of Loughmoe (b. 1595 flourished 1630 died 1644), married Ellen Butler, daughter of the 11th Earl of Dunboyne. Theobald was one of the two members of the 1634 Parliament for the County of Cross Tipperary (the church lands of that county) and was described as an "Irish Papist". Theobald or Tibbot took part in the Rebellion of 1641 on the side of the Confederate Catholics. Loughmoe was attacked during the Rebellion and is listed as "destroyed" and "out of all manner of repayre."
- James Purcell of Loughmoe (b. 1609, d. 13 September 1652), married Elizabeth Butler.
- Nicholas Purcell of Loughmoe (b. 1651, d. 1722)

== Earliest records ==
The earliest records regarding the Barons of Loughmoe is a grant from Hugh Purcell of Loughmoe to the Abbey of Saint Thomas, Dublin.

"Universis Christi fidelibus presentes litteras inspecturis Hugo Purcel salutem:

Noverit universitas vestra me, divine pietatis intuitu, pro salute anime mee, patris mei, et matris mee, et Beatricis, sponse me, et liberorum meorum, consisse et quietum clamasse, Deo et ecclessia de Kildroch.

Et ut mea quitea clamacio firmitatem obtineat, sigillum Thome Purcel, commilitonis mei, presenti scripto, quia proprium sigillum meum in partibu Dublinie non-habui curam apponere.

Hiis testibus: Waltero Purcel, patre meo; Thoma Purcel; Milone de Rocheford; Ricardo de Midia, clerico."

The English translation of this is,

"All trustworthy Christians salute and examine the present grant of Hugh Purcell:

Know that I, divine piety, for the salvation of my soul, my father, my mother, and Beatrix my fiance, and my book, concise and tranquil, God and the Church of Kildroch.

And in order to prevent a discharge of my stability, the present script is sealed by Thomas Purcell, my comrade, and my own seal and parts of Dublin did not have to take the trouble.

The witness: Walter Purcell, my father; Thomas Purcell; Milon of Rocheford, Richard of Midia, clerk."

=== Richard Purcell ===
Richard Purcell was a "direct descendant", perhaps grandson, of Sir Hugh Purcell, 1st Lord of Loughmoe. He had the Feudal title of "Baron of Loughmoe" granted to him by James Butler or James le Bottiler, 1st Earl of Ormond.

=== Geoffrey Rothe Purcell ===
It is noted in the introduction to the Elegy of James Purcell that Geoffrey Rothe Purcell united a dispute between the Butler family and the Purcell family.

=== Peter Purcell ===
Peter Purcell was granted a life of Annuity by Edward IV.

=== James Purcell of Loughmoe ===
James Purcell of Loughmoe was a Baron who attacked much neighboring tribes and farms.

== The May 1652 act of settlement - James and Nicholas Purcell ==
James Purcell died in 1652 and was buried at the Holy Cross abbey. His son, Nicholas Purcell, was the last Baron of Loughmoe, and the maternal nephew of James Butler, 1st Duke of Ormonde. Nicholas was born in 1651. The May 1652 act of settlement saw to it that his father, a Roman Catholic, lost the lands his family had held since 1198. However, James Purcell's marriage to the sister of the Duke of Ormonde enabled a powerful contact, which assured allocation of some property. This did not occur without great difficulty.

== Nicholas Purcell ==
Born in 1651 at an unknown date, Nicholas Purcell of Loughmoe was the first son of Colonel James Purcell (1609–1652), 12th Baron of Loughmoe, and Elizabeth Butler, daughter of Thomas Butler, Viscount Thurles. Between 1652 and 1656, his mother lost and regained her lands in Galway no fewer than four times.

With the Restoration of King Charles II in 1660, the family's fortunes improved. Elizabeth Purcell returned to Loughmoe and again enjoyed the jointure of £300 a year she had received before her removal. The young Baron Nicholas would have been eight or nine at this time and it was probably the first time he had seen his ancestral home. About this time, Elizabeth Purcell married Colonel John Fitzpatrick at Loughmoe; her children were present at the wedding.

By King's Order in a letter dated circa 31 October 1661 the Duke of Ormonde, Baron Nicholas' maternal uncle, was appointed guardian of the young Baron. It would appear that the majority of work in respect to the recovery and management of the Baron's estate fell to Colonel Fitzpatrick who discharged his duty with scrupulous fidelity. Under the Down Survey of 1663 all of the historically Purcell lands, a total of 11,489 acres (46.49 km^{2}) were granted to Baron Nicholas. These lands ran from Holy Cross to Templemore, and included the castles of Loughmoe, Rathelty, Dovea, Ballinahow, Lisheentagirt, Beakstown, Brownestown and Rorodstown. The total value of the property in 1640 was £4,340.

Little is known of the life of Baron Nicholas. This is a significant period of his life, from age 15 to 35. It is known that Baron Nicholas was tutored privately at Loughmoe and spent a considerable part of his day horse riding. At some time in this period Baron Nicholas married the Honourable Rose Trevor, daughter of Viscount Dungannon

== Henry Purcell ==
The English composer Henry Purcell was related to the Purcell family of Loughmoe. He was the son of Henry Purcell, born in Ireland, and was the grandson of Thomas Purcell of Gortanny and Ballyross, Co., Tipperary, who was cousin of the Baron of Loughmoe.

== Sources and further reading ==
- Dubhaltach Mac Firbisigh, Great Book of Irish Genealogies
- Chartulary of la Ste. Trinite, Rouen; and Chartulary of Aumerle; Archeologia, V. 26, as to the Aumerle grant.
- O' Hart, J. Irish Pedigree 5th Edition. 1923.
- Testa de Neville, (Rec. Com.), p. 223 or 225
- Hunter's Pipe Roll, 31, K. H. I., p. 50 and 151
- British Library Add Ch 19572.
- T. De N., p. 128.
- British Library Add Ch 19584.
- T. S Eliot, Murder in the cathedral, 1935.
- Frank Barlow, Thomas Becket, 1986.
- Dáibhí Ó Cróinín, Early medieval Ireland, 400-1200, 1995.
- British Library Harley MS 1708, fol. 21 et seq.
- Testa de Neville, (Rec. Com.), p. 223, 227.
- Red Bk. Of the Exch. 561, 1013.
- Assize R. 80, m. 3d. See Blount, Jocular Tenures (ed. W. C. Hazlitt), p. 126.
- Hunter's Pipe Roll K. H. II., pp. 12, 55, 172.
- T. De. N., p. 87
- Pipe Roll K. H. II., pp. 5 and 76.
- Rymar's Faedera, V. I., p. 43.
- Archives of Normandy in the Prefecture, Rouen.
- Harly Oblate Rolls, A.D. 1200 p. 83.
- Had Ireland Ever A Great Composer? by W.H. Grattan Flood, Mus.D, K.S.G.
- Irish Jacobites: Nicholas Purcell, Baron of Loughmoe
