= Cloone (disambiguation) =

Cloone is a village in County Leitrim, Ireland.

Cloone may also refer to:

- Cloone, Loughmoe East, a townland in County Tipperary, Ireland
- Cloone River, in County Leitrim, Ireland
