= Kilbrickane =

Townland in County Tipperary, Ireland

Kilbrickane (Irish: Cill Bhreacáin, meaning "the church of Bracken") is a relatively small townland, measuring just over 78 hectares (190 acres), in the civil parish of Loughmoe East, County Tipperary. The townland is 2 km (1.2 mi) from the village of Loughmore, 4 km (2.5 mi) from Templemore and 8 km (5.0 mi) from Thurles.

The townland house, Kilbrickane House - completed in 1854 by the Yorkshire-based absentee landlord Rev. Christopher Alderson - is still in good condition. It appears on the map of the townland that was made in the second Ordnance Survey in the last decade of the 19th century. The map of the townland made in the first Ordnance Survey, taken in the first half of the 19th century, shows an earlier, smaller, house, located midway down the avenue which leads from the later house to the road that runs along the eastern boundary of the townland. This earlier map also shows two sets of buildings in the western side of the townland that had disappeared by the time of the second survey in the last decade of the 19th century. Many of the field boundaries had also been changed between the two surveys.

== Inhabitants ==
The 1911 census return indicates that Kilbrickane House was occupied by the Cambie family, from whom it was sold to the Maher family in 1958. Up to the present day, the road junction at the north-east corner of the townland is called Cambies' Cross by people in the locality.

Cambie is an uncommon name so the Cambies of Kilbrickane may have been connected to the Cambie (Camby) family of Eliogarty; Templemore; Killoran, Moyne; Ormond Lower; and Kilbarron.

Three Cambies signed the petition seeking clemency for Daniel and William Cormack.

Henry John Cambie, who was born in Tipperary, may also have been connected.

Kilbrickane House and the adjoining lands remain in the hands of the Maher family.
