= Nicholas Purcell of Loughmoe =

Nicholas Purcell, 13th Baron of Loughmoe (1651 – 4 March 1722) was the son of James Purcell of Loughmoe and the maternal nephew of James Butler, 1st Duke of Ormonde.

A member of the King's Privy Council, Purcell was the right-hand man to Patrick Sarsfield, Earl of Lucan. In 1687 Nicholas Purcell raised a troop of horse to support King James II — they were called the "Yellow Horse," probably from the colour of the Regiment's cornets, as was customary for the period. Nicholas fought at the Battle of the Boyne and at the Battle of Aughrim, and was a signatory to the Treaty of Limerick. He did not flee to Europe after Limerick but remained in Ireland to fight for the rights of Roman Catholics.

The Marquis de Ruvigny notes that Nicholas Purcell of Loughmoe was made Baron Loughmore by King James II in 1690. While there is little other evidence to confirm the creation of this peerage, it would enter the ranks of those titles created by the King while in exile.

== Early years ==
Born sometime in 1651, Nicholas Purcell of Loughmoe Castle was the first son of Colonel James Purcell (1609–1652), 12th Baron of Loughmoe Castle, and Elizabeth Butler, daughter of Thomas Butler, Viscount Thurles, and Elizabeth, Lady Thurles and sister of James Butler, 1st Duke of Ormonde. The May 1652 Act of Settlement saw Nicholas' father, Colonel James Purcell, a Roman Catholic, lose the Tipperary lands the family had held since 1198. The Colonel was set not to be compensated with land in Connaught, however, as his fortunate marriage to the sister of the Duke of Ormonde enabled a powerful contact who ensured the allocation of some property. The allocation of land did not occur without difficulty however. On 13 September 1652, Colonel James Purcell, Baron of Loughmoe died and was buried in the Holy Cross Abbey. Between 1652 and 1656, his widow lost and regained her lands in Galway no fewer than four times.

With the Restoration of King Charles II in 1660, the family's fortunes improved. Elizabeth Purcell returned to Loughmoe and again enjoyed the jointure of £300 a year she had received before her removal. The young Baron Nicholas would have been eight or nine at this time and it was probably the first time he had seen his ancestral home. About this time, Elizabeth Purcell married Colonel John Fitzpatrick at Loughmoe; her children were present at the wedding.

By King's Order in a letter dated circa 31 October 1661 the Duke of Ormonde, Baron Nicholas' maternal uncle, was appointed guardian of the young Baron. It would appear that the majority of work in respect to the recovery and management of the Baron's estate fell to Colonel Fitzpatrick who discharged his duty with scrupulous fidelity. Under the Down Survey of 1663 all of the historically Purcell lands, a total of 11,489 acres (46.49 km^{2}) were granted to Baron Nicholas. These lands ran from Holy Cross to Templemore, and included the castles of Loughmoe, Rathelty, Dovea, Ballinahow, Lisheentagirt, Beakstown, Brownestown and Rorodstown. The total value of the property in 1640 was £4,340.

Again, between 1666 and 1686 little is known of the life of Baron Nicholas. This is a significant period of his life, from age 15 to 35. It is known that Baron Nicholas was tutored privately at Loughmoe and spent a considerable part of their day horse riding. Sometime in this period Baron Nicholas married the Honourable Rose Trevor, daughter of Viscount Dungannon.

== Military beginnings ==
With a strong history of loyalty to the Catholic cause, Nicholas Purcell was commissioned Captain on 12 February 1686 in the army enrolled by Lord Tyrconnell to uphold the cause of King James II. In May 1686 he was admitted as a member to the King's Privy Council of Ireland, he was 35. It was at this time in 1686 that King James II confirmed the title of Baron of Loughmoe to Colonel Nicholas.

Nicholas Purcell married Ellis Browne sometime around 1688; she was 20 years his junior. Ellis Browne was the daughter of Sir Valentine Browne who had a high command in the army of King James II and was created Baron Castlerosse and Viscount Kenmare by the King. In 1689 Col. Nicholas Purcell represented the County of Tipperary in the Parliament in Dublin.

Why he was there we are not certain but on 1 May 1689, accompanying His Majesty King James II from Brest, Col. Nicholas Purcell arrived home to Ireland. At this time Col. Purcell participated in the siege of Derry and an incident there provides an insight into the horsemanship and great courage of Col. Nicholas Purcell. A garrison of William's troops lay entrenched by or near a strand. The garrison fired at the horses of the oncoming Jacobite soldiers and were successful in downing many. Those who did succeed in reaching the defences found themselves confronted by "a dry bank of seven-foot high at the waterside", which most of them quickly decided was impracticable for cavalry.

The commanding officer, Edmund Butler, Viscount Mountgarret's second son, "being extraordinarily well mounted", showed the way and spurring his horse, flew over the bank, only to be at once made prisoner. Colonel Nicholas who was close behind Butler, had his horse killed under him and only saved himself by quickly jumping onto the horse's hind and heaving himself backwards.

After the Siege of Derry, Colonel Nicholas was sent by the King to join the Highland forces of the "Bonnie Dundee". The London Gazette reported 300 Irish troops and 60 horses were landed in Argyllshire, having been transported there by three French men-of-war and several other vessels from Carrickfergus. Colonel Nicholas had brought with him 35 barrels (5.6 m^{3}) of powder, ball, match and flint, and was under the command of Major-General Alexander Cannon.

On the morning of 17 May 1689, 400 men of Colonel Purcell's regiment landed in small boats at Lochaber and escaped capture by Sir George Rooke by hiding in the mountains of Mull. On 12 July 1689 they landed at Duart in the Isle of Mull. During their short passage the French frigates had captured the Scottish privateer Pelican and her consort after a sharp encounter. Purcell's Dragoon's joined Dundee's Highlanders about 16 July, as the clans were gathering to meet the Williamite forces under Lieutenant-General Hugh Mackay. On 27 July the opposing forces met at Killiecrankie, between Aldclune and Aldgirnaig.

On his extreme right flank, facing Balfour's Regiment, Dundee placed Clan Maclean, under Sir John Maclean of Duart, and Purcell's Dragoon Regiment. To their left he placed the Clanranalds, Macdonalds and Glengarrys. On the extreme left flank were the Macdonals of Sleat, and a mixed regiment under Sir Alexander Maclean. To the left center were the Camerons, under Lochiel, opposing Mackay's Regiment. The center, opposite Leven's Regiment, was left open. The Viscount Dundee commanded on the left of center with his cavalry under Sir William Wallace.

Dundee held his fire until a half-hour before sunset, at which time the Highlanders charged down from the heights of Killiecrankie whooping war cries, and finally at muzzle-point, drawing their claymores and stampeding the Williamite troops. Purcell's Dragoon Regiment participated in the charge with gallantry.

Iain Lom MacDonald, one of the Highlanders present, well expressed the outcome when he later wrote: -In the tender birch copse, Near the farm of MacGeorge, Full many a gay cloak lies torn.

Unfortunately for the Jacobite cause the "Bonnie Dundee" was mortally wounded in the battle, and the initial advantage melted away. Purcell's Dragoon Regiment returned to Ireland and joined the squadron which had stayed behind and served with Major-General Buchan before Enniskillen on 30 July.

Earlier in the summer French Marshal Conrad von Rosen had rendezvoused at Trim, while on his way to attack Enniskillen. He had written to King James II from the rendezvous on 6 June 1689 to complain that Purcell's Dragoon Regiment was not well enough equipped to fight effectively. On 29 June von Rosen noted that the Duke of Berwick was using Purcell's dragoons to fortify positions on the River Finn and later in the defence of Omagh. The regiment received a commendation by the Duke of Berwick in action near Enniskillen, in a dispatch to Lieutenant-General Richard Hamilton.

On 29 August 1689 M. d'Escot wrote to Comte d'Avaux from Drogheda that Gormanston's Regiment had arrived that afternoon, and Purcell's Dragoon Regiment had arrived that evening, and listed Purcell's Regiment as composed of 12 troops for a total of 360 men, as recently determined by a review of troops. The regiment may have arrived from Bangor Bay with Brigadier Thomas Maxwell and a force of 500 horse and dragoons.

The planned attack of Dundalk did not materialise, and on 6 October King James' Army fell back on Ardee, which had been converted into a defended frontier position. From Ardee, on 21 October, Comte d'Avaux wrote the French King's Minister of War, Marquis Louvois, that he had been occupied reviewing two or three petty disputes between French and Irish officers, and hoped he had finally put them to rest. The most serious dispute was between a French lieutenant and one of the dragoons from Purcell's Regiment. The French lieutenant had been seriously wounded by the dragoon in the course of an argument, and he could have been arraigned for a military court martial because Purcell had stated he had never seen the lieutenant's commission, although the lieutenant had said he had participated in all the regiment's tests of arms; had served with the regiment as an officer before Derry and Enniskillen, and had habitually bivouacked in the field with the other officers.

The upshot was King James reprimanded the Irish officers who had recommended a court martial, and Comte d'Avaux acknowledging the French lieutenant was inclined to swagger and had a quick temper, sent him to his own quarters where he could care for him and dress his wounds.

Another French lieutenant had served with the regiment at an earlier period, and figured in an episode in 1687. While the regiment was stationed at Cashel, Lieutenant Rene Mezandiere ordered the Deputy Mayor, Charles Robinson, cast into the common prison "a noysome place on Sunday morning." All this occurred on 25 September 1687. The Corporation petitioned the Government "that ye ad Lieut. be effectually prosecuted for ye same." Later, on 27 October 1687, the Corporation records, "The chapter doe wait upon Captain Purcell to acquaint him with the injuries done by the Souldiers to the Cathedral gates, Church yard, and to them that are employed to look after them from harme or trespasses." One wonders how Colonel Nicholas dealt with this matter.

During the war years, Colonel Purcell's wife and children evidently lived in France. The will of Lieutenant Pierce Power of Thurles, dated 26 June 1689, not only lists the amounts of money owed him by Colonel Purcell, but also mentions the fact his daughter, Cecily, was living with Mary Purcell of Loughmoe.

The following Roster of Officers of the Regiment is taken from various French Muster Rolls of Reviews held in Ireland after the arrival of King James II. The regiment was raised mostly in Tipperary:

- Col. Nicholas Purcell, Commanding Officer,
- Lt. Col. Robert Purcell, Executive,
- Major Charles McDonnel,
- Rev. Delany, Chaplain.
- Troop 1. Colonel Nicholas Purcell, Lieut. James Fitzgerald, Cornet James Butler of Boytonrath (brother Sir Toby Butler, Solicitor-General), Quartermaster William Barron, and 40 dragoons.
- Troop 2. Lt. Col. Robert Purcell, Liut. Thomas Purcell, Cornet Anthony Purcell, Quartermaster Daniel Quinn, and 45 dragoons.
- Troop 3. Capt. Sir John Everard of Fethard (Cousin of Col. Purcell and brother-in-law of Capt. James Butler), Lieut. Michael Kerny, Cornet Thomas Travers, Quartermaster James Tumy, and 31 dragoons.
- Troop 4. Capt. Miles Bourk, Lieut. Cornelius Meagher, Cornet Bryan Meagher, Quartermaster John Fitzgerald, and 31 dragoons.
- Troop 5. Capt. Daniel McCarthy, Liet. Pierce Power of Thurles, Cornet Owen McCarthy, Quartermaster Edmund Meagher, and 36 dragoons.
- Troop 6. Capt. Anthony Morres, Lieut. John Kennedy, Cornet Hugh Kennedy, Quartermaster Richard Keating and 25 dragoons.
- Troop 7. Capt. John Purcell of Coneby, Kilkenny, Lieut. Theobald Purcell of Moyarde (member of the Peace Party), Cornet Hugh Purcell, Quartermaster James Wale, and 21 dragoons.
- Troop 8. Capt. James Butler of Grangebeg (later, 6th Baron Dunboyne), Lieut. Theobald Butler of Culecullenduff (Capt.John Purcell named executor of his will 14 December 1698), Cornet Thomas Meagh, and 31 dragoons.
- Troop 9. Capt. Condon, Lieut. Fitzgerald, Cornet Maly and 36 dragoons.
- Troop 10. Capt. Cantwell, Lieut. Condon, Cornet Hurly, and 36 dragoons.
- Troop 11. Capt. Edward Morres, Lieut. Ryan, Cornet Keating, and 44 dragoons.
- Troop 12. Capt. Tobin, Lieut. Butler, Cornet Meyrick, and 44 dragoons. The Regiment probably averaged 420 dragoons and 45 officers.

During the winter of 1689 the regiment was engaged in skirmishes on the frontier, mostly around Belturbet.

== Battle of the Boyne ==
The first big battle of 1690 was the Battle of the Boyne, on 1 July. King James held Colonel Browne's Infantry and Colonel Purcell's Dragoons in reserve at the Battle of the Boyne, and late in the day he committed his reserve behind the Comte de Lauzun, as the latter was about to charge the Williamite right flank which faced him within cannon shot. King James ordered Sir James Carny, the reserve commander, to move the reserve up to Lauzun's right flank and Purcell's Dragoons to dismount and engage as infantry.

At this moment an aid rode up with the news that the Irish right flank had been defeated. General Sarsfield and General Maxwell rode up to say it was impossible for the horse to charge the enemy because directly ahead lay two double ditches with high banks and a brook running between them. Also at this point of time, the Williamite dragoons mounted and the whole line marched by the flank to their right in the direction of the Dublin Road. Lauzun advised the King to take his own regiment of a horse and a squadron of Purcell's Dragoons and make his way to Dublin.

Sarsfield then rallied the cavalry and dragoons and covered the retreat to Dublin. The Irish Army paused at Dublin just long enough to regroup, then moved on for the defence of Limerick. King James departed Kinsale for France 2 July 1690.

== Limerick ==
Purcell's Dragoon Regiment rode down to County Clare to rendezvous with the cavalry. French Major-General Boisseleau commanded the defence of Limerick, and the Williamites commenced their attack in August, and soon occupied both Ireton's Fort and Cromwell's Fort. Shortly thereafter, on 11 August 1690, Sarsfield crossed the Shannon near Killaloe with the pick of the Irish cavalry and dragoons including Purcell's Regiment.

Sarsfield led his troopers through the Tipperary mountains to Ballyneety where the Williamite siege train had encamped for the night, about 14 miles (23 km) south-east of Limerick. They took the enemy completely by surprise, and blew up two of their guns, and destroyed 12,000 pounds of powder, match and grenades. This raid became one of Sarsfield's most celebrated exploits.

Six guns salvaged from Ballyneety arrived on 16 August and the Williamite forces prepared for the forthcoming assault on Limerick. The heavy guns arrived from Waterford and the bombardment of the walls of Limerick commenced. Many fires were started by the incendiary bombs, and finally a breach was made in the wall about forty-two yards wide. General Boisseleau dug a retrenchment behind the breach, on which he mounted guns for defence.

On Wednesday, 20 August 1690, an attack in force was made upon the redoubt, after two days of bombardment. The first attack was repulsed. The second attack succeeded. General Boisseleau ordered 300 of Colonel Purcell's Dragoons and 150 of Colonel Luttrell's Cavalry to make a sally from St. John's Gate and attempt to retake the redoubt. When the Irish thundered out they were savagely met by the Williamites. The besiegers lost over 300 men repulsing the sally. The Irish lost 100 men and two officers; Lt. Col. Robert Purcell and Lieutenant Pierce Power.

Later, Brigadier Talbot led the Irish dragoons on a well timed sally from the spur at St. John's Gate. They were met by two enemy regiments, and after bloody encounter, forced their way through, re-entering the town through the breach and taking the besiegers from the rear. The Williamites were thrown into confusion and Boisseleau seized the moment to throw in his whole force. The Irish drove the besiegers back through the breach, over the counterscarp, back to their trenches, then back to their camp, for a complete victory after a battle of four hours. The siege of Limerick was raised and the Williamites withdrew.

== Deputation to St. Germain ==
Colonel Purcell was one of those included in the deputation to St. Germain to persuade James to remove the Duke of Tyrconnell as head of the Army. The deputation was made up of Brigadier Henry Luttrell, Colonel Simon Luttrell, and Peter Creagh, Bishop of Cork. General Thomas Maxwell sailed to represent Tyrconnell. James met with the delegates, then took them to interview Louis XIV.

The delegates asked for a French general to command the Irish Army. On 9 May 1691, a French convoy reached Limerick with General Charles St. Ruth, two lieutenant-generals, d'Usson and de Tessé, and Brigadier Luttrell and Colonel Purcell, and also a considerable quantity of arms, ammunition and supplies.

There was confusion over who was now in charge of the army. St Ruth claimed command while Tyrconnell still claimed viceroy authority and ultimate control of the army. According to an account in the Life of James, Tyrconnell eventually submitted and left the management of the army to St. Ruth, who was superficially on good terms with him but at bottom was prejudiced against him, influenced by Luttrell and Purcell.

General St. Ruth reviewed the Irish regiments on 18 and 19 May. On 2 June John Stevens noted, "Purcell's Regiment of Horse marched out of Limerick toward the camp". With a force of 16,000-foot (4,900 m), 3000 horse, and 2,000 dragoons St. Ruth had his first encounter with the Williamite forces of 18,000, commanded by Baron de Ginkel, on 21 June 1691, at Athlone. This proved to be a Jacobite defeat. St. Ruth fell back to Ballinasloe, then decided to give battle on the high ground near Aughrim, about five miles (8 km) southwest of Ballinasloe.

St. Ruth took up his position on the eastern slopes of Kilcommodon Hill on 8 July. It was a good position, protected by a belt of bog along the whole front, behind which he placed his infantry. His right flank was anchored at Tristaum bridge at Urraghry Pass, and guarded by cavalry regiments of the Duke of Tyrconnell, Earl of Abercorn, and Colonel Edward Prendergast. His left flank was secured by Colonel Walter Bourk and 200-foot (61 m) in position in the Aughrim Castle ruin, and also guarded by the cavalry regiments of the Earl of Lucan, Brigadier Henry Luttrell and Colonel John Parker, and Colonel Purcell's Dragoon Regiment near the castle, all under the command of Major-General Dominick Sheldon. His command was subsequently weakened during the course of battle through transfer of elements of his cavalry and dragoons to the right flank. Purcell's dragoons evidently fought piecemeal, some trooper on the left flank and some on the right flank, mounted or dismounted, depending on the situation. Major Sir John Everard was killed in this action.

At the beginning of the battle, elements of Sheldon's cavalry repulsed four battalions of Williamite infantry working south of the causeway. Later the Marquis de Ruvigny, leading about 14 squadrons of Williamite horse, rode up the causeway, two by two, into the fire of Irish Infantry and Purcell's dragoons in trenches, and Bourk's infantrymen in the castle ruin; passed within thirty yards of the castle; forded the stream and forced the pass, and thus enfiladed the Irish left flank. Apparently, Sheldon's cavalry was unable to turn the enemy horse. General St. Ruth was killed in battle and the Irish Army was in complete route by 9 o'clock at night.

After the Battle of Aughrim, Purcell's Dragoon Regiment participated in the defence of Limerick for the second time. With the approval of Queen Mary, General Ginkel sent a communication to Tyrconnell in late July 1691 attempting to settle the battle of Limerick. Ginkel seems to have thought Tyrconnell more likely to compromise that Sarsfield "who with Luttrell and Purcell are the drivers and certainly have pensions from France". General Ginkel's gunners started the bombardment on 8 September 1691. On the night of 15 September Ginkel's forces crossed the main stream of the Shannon above Limerick. The Irish dragoons and infantry pulled back to Limerick over the Thomond bridge. The Irish cavalry rode back to Ennis.

On 22 September the Williamites moved along the Clare bank of the Shannon, and up to the Irish works at the approaches to the Thomond bridge. The Irish troops were pushed back to the bridge. A French Major ordered the drawbridge pulled up, shutting out the retreating troops. Almost everyone on the bridge was killed, including Colonel Redmond (or Redmund) Stapleton of Thurlesbegg and Major Thomas Purcell, Colonel Purcell's younger brother.

== Siege of Limerick ==
Limerick, now under siege on all sides, beat a parley on 24 September, and the news was sent to the Irish Cavalry near Ennis. Several delegates arrived for a parley with General Ginkel; they included the Archbishop of Cashel, the Earl of Westmeath, the Lord Dillon, the Lord Galmoy, Major-General Sheldon and Colonel Nicholas Purcell. They dined with General Ginkel, then rode on to Limerick.

On 28 September, the Irish commissioners rode out to negotiate with General Ginkel. They were: Patrick, Earl of Lucan, Piercy Viscount Galmoy, Colonel Nicholas Purcell, Colonel Nicholas Cusack, Sir Toby Butler, Colonel Garrett Dillon and Colonel John Browne. The articles to the Treaty of Limerick were agreed upon 3 October between Sir Charles Porter and Thomas Coningsby, Lords Justice of Ireland, and Lieutenant-General Ginkel for the Williamites, and Patrick Earl Lucan, Piercy Viscount Galmoy, Colonel Nicholas Purcell, Colonel Garrett Dillon, and Colonel John Browne for the Irish.

They secured either the right to go overseas or, if they accepted William's regime, immunity from discriminatory laws. But civil articles to secure toleration for Roman Catholics were not ratified, thus enabling later Irish leaders to denounce the "broken treaty" of Limerick.

== Later years ==
Thus ended Colonel Purcell's Dragoon Regiment's service in King James II's Irish Army. Most of them went back to their homes in Tipperary and Kilkenny, although some went to France with Baron Dunboyne. Colonel Purcell chose to remain in Ireland. He was still active in the affairs of the state as can be seen when Colonel Purcell, along with Viscount Fitzwilliams of Meryon and John Seigrave, Esq. on behalf of all Roman Catholics in Ireland, signed his name to a petition read at the Council of Parliament on 28 June 1695. The petition claimed that some Bills sent from England were "injurious to the petitioners' rights" and asked for time to examine the Bills and if necessary lodge "exceptions". The petition, "after full debate, [was] rejected."

On 31 October 1695 Colonel Purcell, along with Colonel Luttrell, attended the Privy Council to petition for an Act of Parliament to confirm the Articles of the Treaty of Limerick. History tells us that they were not successful.

We again in the life of Colonel Purcell reach a period were only sporadic incidents are known. For an unknown reason, on 28 April 1697 the Duke of Shrewsbury wrote to the Lords of the Treasury that amongst other payments, "Col. Nicholas Purcell should have 100l." On 16 June 1699 Colonel Purcell was managing, with a Mr. Roberts, South and Savage, the estate of Viscount Kenmare, his father-in-law. Colonel Purcell is quoted as saying that "Protestant tenants will readily take it (the estate) at £3,000 a year".

On 30 March 1705 a special order was issued that issued licenses for Roman Catholics in Ireland to carry certain arms. Colonel Purcell was among the sixty or so people listed and was allowed to carry 1 sword, 1 case of pistols and 1 gun.

Of Colonel Purcell's children we know the following. As already mentioned his only son fell into a vat of boiling water and died. Of his three daughters it is only known that two of them married. Catherine, his second daughter married a member of the Gaelic nobility, Domhnall, the O'Callaghan. His third daughter, married a man surnamed White from Leixlip who apparently by 1705 was not yet eighteen. In conversation with a Paul Davys, possibly a cousin, Col. Purcell's daughter stated that she "desires not to live with her husband until he is eighteen." The Purcell-Whites were the last to live in Loughmoe and did so until approximately 1760.

On 4 March 1722, Colonel Nicholas Purcell of Loughmoe, 13th Baron of Loughmoe died. He was buried in the old abbey in Loughmore. For some reason, there are two stones appearing to record his death.

== Sources ==
- Burke, Bernard; Burke, Ashworth P. (1909). A Genealogical and Heraldic History of the Peerage and Baronetage, the Privy Council, Knightage and Companionage (71st ed.). London: Harrison. OCLC 28297274.
- Cokayne, George Edward (1893). The complete peerage of England, Scotland, Ireland, Great Britain and the United Kingdom, extant, extinct, or dormant. Vol. 5 (1st ed.). London: George Bell and Sons. OCLC 1180836840. – L to M (for Loughmore)
- Lodge, John (1789). Archdall, Mervyn (ed.). The Peerage of Ireland or, A Genealogical History of the Present Nobility of that Kingdom. Vol. 4. Dublin: James Moore. OCLC 264906028. – Viscounts (for Mountgarett)
- Ruvigny, Melville Henry, Marquis de (1904). Jacobite Peerage Baronetage Knightage and Grants of Honour. Edinburgh: T C & E C Jack. OCLC 655825906.
- King James' Irish Army List, 1689, by John D'Alton
- Journal of the Waterford & the South East of Ireland Archeological Society, Page 199
