= Richard Purcell of Loughmoe =

17th century Baron of Loughmoe

The arms of the Barons of Loughmoe

Richard Purcell of Loughmoe (died 15 September 1624) was the fourth-to-last Baron of Loughmoe. He inherited the title in the early 17th century, following the death of his older brother Ralph He commissioned the extension of Loughmoe castle to be constructed, and was a member of a jury in Clonmel. In 1846 The Annals of Ireland described Purcell as an "Anglo-Irish against the Queen Elizabeth I," referring to his participation in Essex's Rebellion c. 1599.

Around 1606, Purcell's rights to the Loughmoe estate were challenged by his sister-in-law Margaret. During the course of the dispute, Margaret's brother Adam Tobin, the Sheriff of Tipperary, "seized goods and cattle from Richard as surety." Purcell is alleged to have confronted and murdered Tobin, a charge for which he was arrested and detained in Dublin Castle. In November 1606, Purcell wrote a letter to the Lord Deputy protesting his innocence. He would later appear before a jury in Tipperary, who acquitted him of the murder charges but convicted him of manslaughter.

In February 1612 (Note: Or possibly 1613; historical texts give conflicting dates), Purcell, John Tobin of Killogh and Pierce Butler of Knockgraffon were summoned to court at Clonmel "for refusing to present as recusants divers of the parishioners of Lisronagh." They appeared before Chief Baron Methwolde and were each fined £200 (equivalent to £48,854 in 2023).

After Purcell's death in 1624, the title of Baron of Loughmoe was passed down to his son Theobold. According to Brien Purcell Horan, Purcell had at least two younger brothers. Horen was also able to track Purcell's descendants until his great-grandson Nicholas, but information about any further descendants or who may have inherited the title of Baron of Loughmoe are unknown. In his family saga, he wrote of the situation:

Who are their descendants? This is an extremely difficult question to answer, due to the frustrating incompleteness of the records of 18th century Catholics. Detailed information on their descendants is lacking. In addition, because the Loughmoe title was not a peerage, there was no need to keep detailed and complete genealogies, because whoever succeeded to the lands and castle of Loughmoe at any given time would become the [B]aron, and his closest relatives at the time all would have known their own place within the pecking order.
