= Killahara Castle =

Restored tower house in County Tipperary, Ireland

Coordinates: 52°43′09″N 7°51′43″W

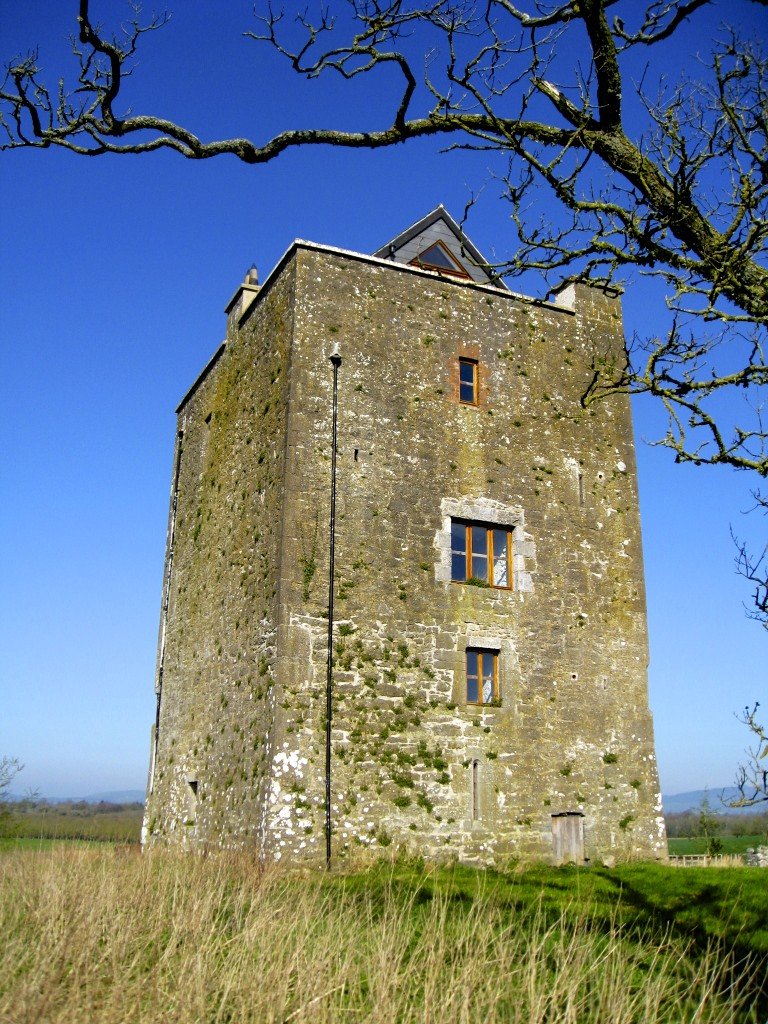
West face of the Killahara tower house

Killahara Castle is a tower house in the townland of Killahara in County Tipperary, Ireland. Built in the 16th century, it is located near Thurles and the villages of Dovea and Loughmore.

== History ==
Killahara Castle was originally built c. 1550 for Donagh O'Fogartie, the chief of the O'Fogartie clan who controlled large areas of North Tipperary at that time. O'Fogartie was killed in battle in 1583 and ownership of the castle subsequently passed through his widow, a Purcell, to members of the Purcell family.

During the Cromwellian conquest of Ireland in 1649, the Purcells were expelled as 'forfeiting papists'. Cromwell's forces ransacked the building and removed the roof. The Fogartie/Purcell lands were awarded to an English adventurer, Annesley.

The lands and now ruined castle were transferred in the early 18th century to the Trants who already owned large tracts of land in County Kerry. The Trants controlled the lands remotely until a branch of the Trant family built an estate house (Dovea House) in the early 1830s.

In A Topographical Dictionary of Ireland, published by Samuel Lewis in 1837, the entry for the parish of Loughmoe East (Callabeg) describes the structure at Killahara as "a very fine old castle, which formerly belonged to the Purcells, and is now the property of Mr. Trant".

Tenants of the Trants (including members of the Fogartie family) lived in the semi-derelict castle up to 1850 when one man, Black Jack Fogarty who had been "beggared by the Great Famine", was evicted from Killahara.

In 1852, John Trant commissioned a restoration project for the castle. He had only partially completed this when his attention moved to building a village (Dovea) and church for workers he had brought in from Great Britain.

In 1903, Fitzgibbon Trant attempted a further restoration project, after which his aunt Emily took up residence for a period.

During the Irish War of Independence, in 1920, the castle was burnt out by the Black and Tans as they reputedly believed that members of the Irish Republican Army were meeting there.

The castle and its surrounding lands were sold, by the Trant family, to a local farmer's coop in the 1930s.

The castle was sold again in 2006 and the new owners undertook a project to make the castle habitable. The project was completed in November 2008.
