= Derry, Loughmoe East =

Townland in County Tipperary, Ireland

Derry is a townland in the civil parish of Loughmoe East, County Tipperary. Derry (Gaelic, Doire), Loughmoe East Civil Parish, Barony of Eliogarty, County Tipperary was originally 81 Acres, 3 Rood, 25 Perch.
