= Cloone, County Tipperary =

Townland in County Tipperary, Ireland

Cloone (Irish: Cluain) is a townland in the civil parish of Loughmoe East, County Tipperary, Ireland. It is located southeast of Templemore.
