= Loughmoe West =

Civil parish in County Tipperary, Ireland

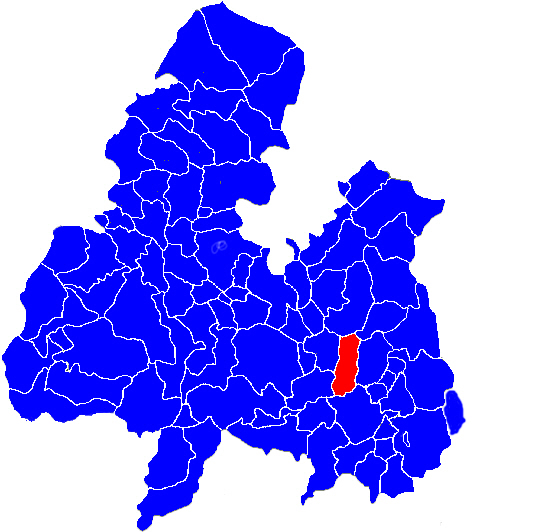
Position of the Loughmoe parish, in red, among the other civil parishes of North Tipperary

Loughmoe West is a civil parish in County Tipperary, Ireland. It is one of 21 civil parishes in the historical barony of Eliogarty. The River Suir to the east forms the boundary with the parish of Loughmoe East. The village of Loughmore is situated in the townland of Tinvoher.

== See also ==
- Loughmoe East
