= Ranulf de Broc =

12th-century Anglo-Norman nobleman

- Died: around 1179
- Occupation(s): royal usher and marshall
- Spouse: Dametta de Gorron
- Children: Edelina; Felicia; Sibil; Lucy; Clemence
- Parent: Oin Purcel

Ranulf de Broc (sometimes Rannulf de Broc; died around 1179) was an Anglo-Norman nobleman and royal official during the reign of King Henry II of England. He held two offices in the royal household as well as performing other administrative duties for the king. During the Becket controversy (lasting until Becket's death in 1170) between King Henry and Thomas Becket, the Archbishop of Canterbury, de Broc supported the king and was granted the administration of the exiled archbishop's lands during the later half of the 1160s. This earned de Broc three sentences of excommunication from the archbishop because of de Broc's financial exactions from the estates. De Broc was with the four men who murdered Becket in December 1170, although he did not take part in the actual murder. At de Broc's death around 1179, he left behind a widow and five daughters, who were his co-heiresses.

== Early life and career ==
De Broc was the son of Oin Purcel and was the nephew of Nigel de Broc. (Note: Katharine Keats-Rohan calls Ranulf the nephew of Nigel de Broc in Ranulf's entry in Domesday Descendants but in Nigel's entry states that Nigel was Ranulf's brother.) De Broc held the offices of usher and marshall in the royal household under King Henry II. He was receiver of the forest of Witingelega in Hampshire from 1158 to 1168.

== Administrator of Canterbury ==
During the Becket controversy, which began in October 1163, de Broc supported King Henry II of England and was appointed to oversee the lands and income of the see of Canterbury while Thomas Becket, the Archbishop of Canterbury, was in exile after fleeing England in October 1164. The estates were given into de Broc's custody at Christmas 1164, although the grant was back-dated to Michaelmas (29 September) 1164. De Broc was to pay the king 1562 pounds 5 shillings and 5.5 pence annually from the revenues of the estate. Ranulf entrusted the day-to-day administration of Canterbury to his kinsman Robert de Broc. (Note: Robert de Broc was supposedly a renegade monk. The historian Frank Barlow calls Robert both Ranulf's "nephew" and "kinsman".) The de Brocs continued to administer the estates until Michaelmas 1170. Soon after de Broc took up the administration of Canterbury, Becket accused de Broc of despoiling the Canterbury estates. Historians are not clear on whether Becket's charges were just propaganda or if the estates were actually damaged. De Broc managed to secure the support of some of the monks of the cathedral chapter of Canterbury, as some monks were willing to inform de Broc of any proceedings of the chapter that were favourable to Becket.

Late in December 1164 de Broc was one of the royal officials who took possession of the archiepiscopal residence at Lambeth for the king, as well as arresting the relatives, clerks, and members of the household of Becket who had aided Becket's flight into exile. In June 1166 Becket excommunicated de Broc for his part in administering the archiepiscopal estates for the king while Becket was in exile. Becket again excommunicated de Broc in April 1169, along with Robert de Broc and a number of other royal officials.

== Role in Becket's murder ==
In July 1170, Becket and the king were reconciled and the king agreed that the archiepiscopal estates would be returned to Becket's control. But difficulties dragged on and Becket accused de Broc of stripping the estates of the recent harvest and storing it away from the archbishop's control. In November, John of Salisbury was sent by Becket to England to inspect the estates prior to Becket's return from exile. John claimed that although de Broc had originally returned custody of the estates to Becket's officials, shortly before John's arrival de Broc had regained control of the estates and expelled Becket's officials. De Broc was also accused of seizing a cargo of the archbishop's wine and destroying the ship carrying it.

Later in 1170, de Broc was involved in an attempt to keep Becket from returning to England. Working with de Broc were Roger de Pont L'Évêque – the Archbishop of York, Gilbert Foliot – the Bishop of London, Josceline de Bohon – the Bishop of Salisbury, Gervase de Cornhill – the Sheriff of Kent, and Reginald de Warenne. De Broc was part of the party that met Becket at Sandwich on 1 December 1070 when the archbishop returned to England. The group, led by Gervase of Cornhill, complained that Becket was sowing dissension in the land by his excommunication of the Archbishop of York and the Bishops of London and Salisbury, but Becket managed to calm the officials by stating he would consider the matter and reply to them the next day. The next day the group was accompanied by some clergy sent by the three excommunicated ecclesiastics, but nothing was accomplished by this meeting except further offers from Becket to consider other options.

Becket excommunicated both de Brocs again on Christmas Day, 1170. On 28 December 1170, de Broc received at Saltwood Castle four knights – William de Tracy, Reginald fitzUrse, Hugh de Morville, and Richard le Breton – who had arrived from the continent. The five men conceived a plan to surround Canterbury Cathedral and force Becket to rescind his excommunications. On 29 December 1170, the five men arrived at Canterbury, where it appears that de Broc was in charge of the soldiers surrounding the cathedral while the other four went inside to negotiate with the archbishop. The four did not succeed in persuading the archbishop, and the situation degenerated into the four men murdering Becket at one of the altars of the cathedral. After this, the four rejoined de Broc and searched the archiepiscopal residence for papers and other documents that de Broc was to send to the king. The party then returned to Saltwood.

== Later career and death ==
In the Revolt of 1173–74 by Henry II's sons against their father, the king gave de Broc custody of Haughley Castle. On 13 October 1173, Robert de Beaumont, the Earl of Leicester, captured the castle for the rebels and burned it to the ground.

De Broc married Dametta de Gorron, who brought lands at Frollebury (Frobury) in Hampshire and Chetton, Eudon and Berwick in Shropshire to the marriage. Besides his wife's lands, de Broc also held lands worth half a knight's fee at Angmering in Sussex and lands worth a full knight's fee at Pepperharrow.

De Broc's marriage produced five daughters, who were de Broc's coheiresses when he died around 1179. Dametta died in 1204. The eldest daughter was Edelina, and the other four were Felicia, Sibil, Lucy, and Clemence. Edelina married Stephen of Turnham, Felicia married William Harang, Sibil married William de Arundel and Ralph Belet, and Clemence married William de Tatlington.
