= Loughmoe East =

Civil parish in County Tipperary, Ireland

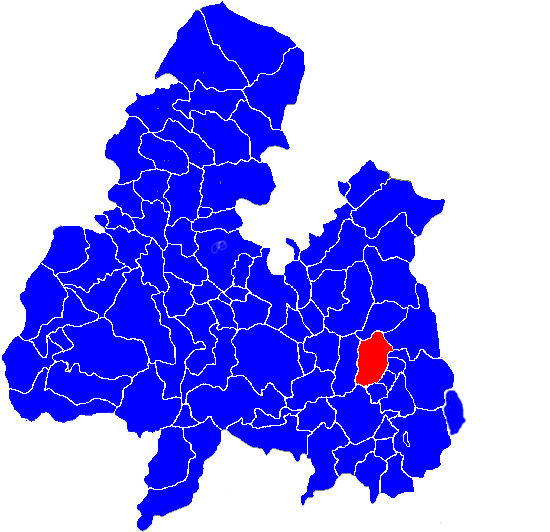
Position of the parish within the civil parishes of north Tipperary

Loughmoe East, also known as Callabeg (Irish: Na Cealla Beaga), is a civil parish in County Tipperary, Ireland.

== History ==
In A Topographical Dictionary of Ireland, published by Samuel Lewis in 1837, the parish is described as:

CALLABEG, or KILNASEAR, also called LOUGHMOE-EAST, a parish, in the barony of ELIOGARTY, county of TIPPERARY, and province of MUNSTER, 2 1/2 miles (S. E.) from Templemore; containing 1600 inhabitants.

This parish is situated on the river Suir, which separates it from Loughmoe-West, and on the road from Templemore to Thurles, and comprises 3417 statute acres, as applotted under the tithe act. On the townland of Killahara is a very fine old castle, which formerly belonged to the Purcells, and is now the property of Mr. Trant.

It is a rectory and vicarage, in the diocese of Cashel, and is part of the union of Templetuohy and corps of the prebend of Kilbragh in the cathedral of Cashel: the tithes amount to £249. 17. 9. There is a pay school, in which are about 30 boys and 20 girls.

== Townlands ==
The civil parish contains the townlands of:

- Ballyduag
- Baronstown
- Brownstown
- Clogharailybeg
- Clogharailymore
- Clonamuckogemore
- Cloone
- Coogulla
- Curraghmore
- Derry
- Gortnahaha
- Gortreagh
- Graiguefrahane
- Kilbrickane
- Kilcoke
- Kilcurkree
- Killanigan
- Killeenleigh
- Kilnaseer
- Penane
- Skeagh

== See also ==
- Loughmoe West
