= Dovea, County Tipperary =

Village in County Tipperary, Ireland

Coordinates: 52°43′10″N 7°51′28″W

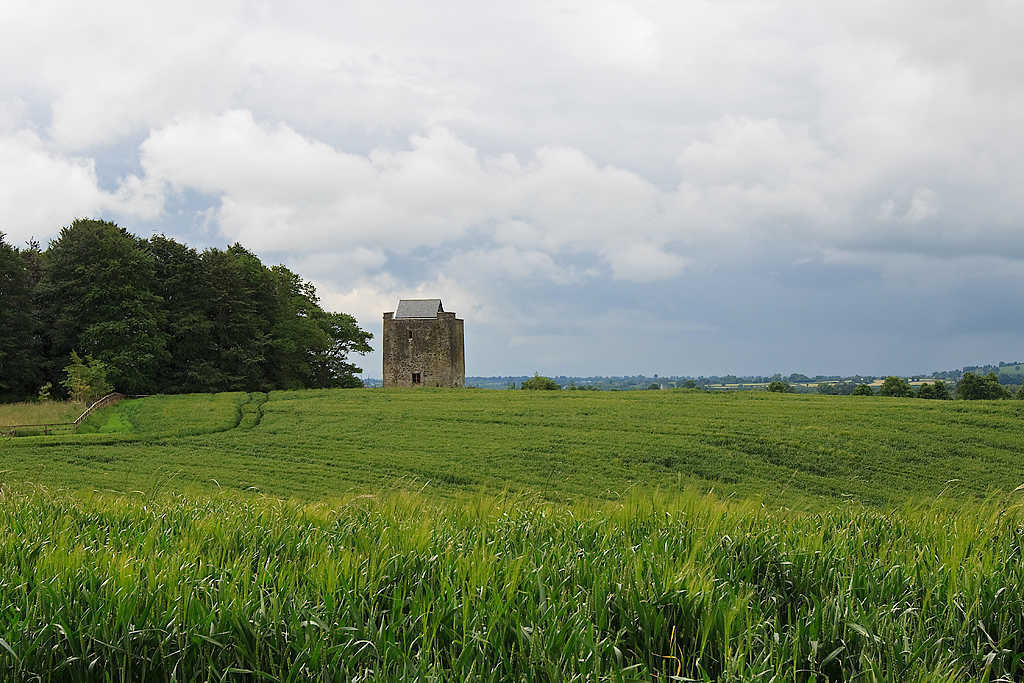
Killahara Castle, a 16th century tower house, is near Dovea

Dovea (Irish: An Dubhfhéith) is a small village in County Tipperary in Ireland. Also sometimes known as Killahara, it is located within the civil parish of Inch and the historical barony of Eliogarty.

Evidence of ancient settlement in the area includes a number of ringfort and enclosure sites in the townlands of Dovea Lower, Dovea Upper and Killahara. Killahara Castle is close to Dovea village. This 16th century tower house, historically associated with the O'Fogartie and Purcell families, was later owned by the Trant family.

The former Church of Ireland church in Dovea, which was dedicated to Saint Michael and completed c. 1830, has been converted for use as a private home. It is included in Tipperary County Council's Record of Protected Structures. Dovea House, which was also built c. 1830, is also a protected structure.

The National Ploughing Championships were held in the area in 1962.
