= Saltwood Castle =

Castle in Kent, England

- Kent in England
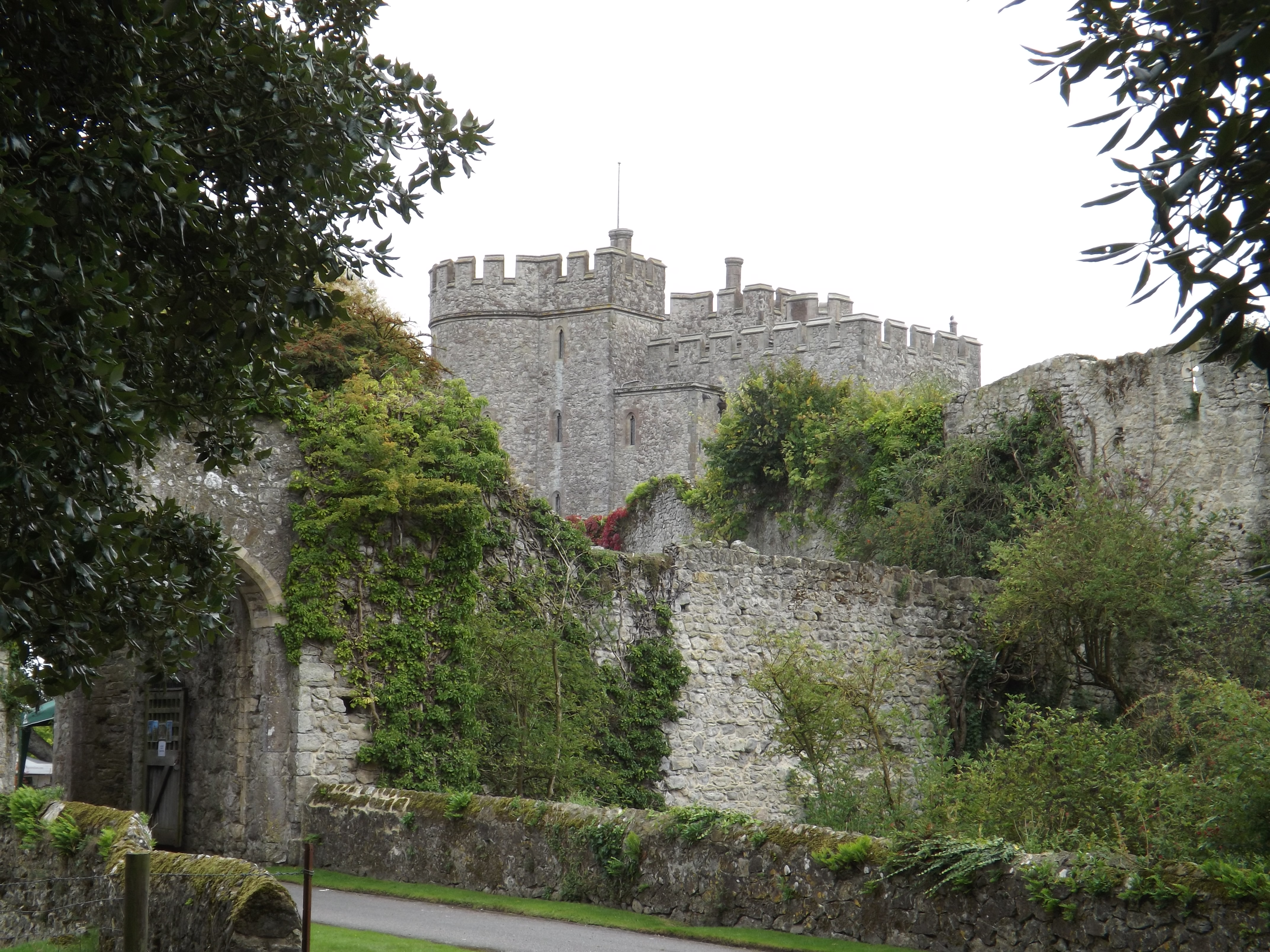
- Saltwood Castle in 2013

Site information
- Owner: Private
- Open to the public: No

Location
- Shown within Kent
- Coordinates: 51°4′54.64″N 1°5′3.72″E
- Grid reference: grid reference NY530271

Site history
- Materials: Stone

Saltwood Castle is a castle in Saltwood village, one mile (2 km) north of Hythe, Kent, England. Of 11th century origin, the castle was expanded in the 13th and 14th centuries. After the Norman Conquest, the castle was appropriated by the Archbishop of Canterbury Lanfranc and remained the property of the archbishops, with some interruptions, until 1540, when Thomas Cranmer was compelled to cede it to Henry VIII. The castle is reputed to have been the meeting place of the four knights who carried out the assassination of Thomas Becket in 1170. By the 19th century, it was "largely ruinous" and restorations to make portions of the castle habitable were carried out in the 1880s and 1930s. In the late 19th century, the castle was bought by an ancestor of Bill Deedes, the journalist and politician, who grew up there. In the 20th century, it was sold to Sir Martin Conway who commissioned Philip Tilden to undertake a restoration. In 1953, the castle was bought by the art historian Kenneth Clark (1903–1983), and then became the home of his son, the politician and diarist, Alan Clark (1928–1999). It remains the private home of his widow, Jane Clark. The castle is a Grade I listed building.

== History ==
=== Origins ===
The castle was probably erected on a Roman site, though Bronze Age implements and copper ingots discovered in Hayne's Wood, 1874, show the site had already long been inhabited.

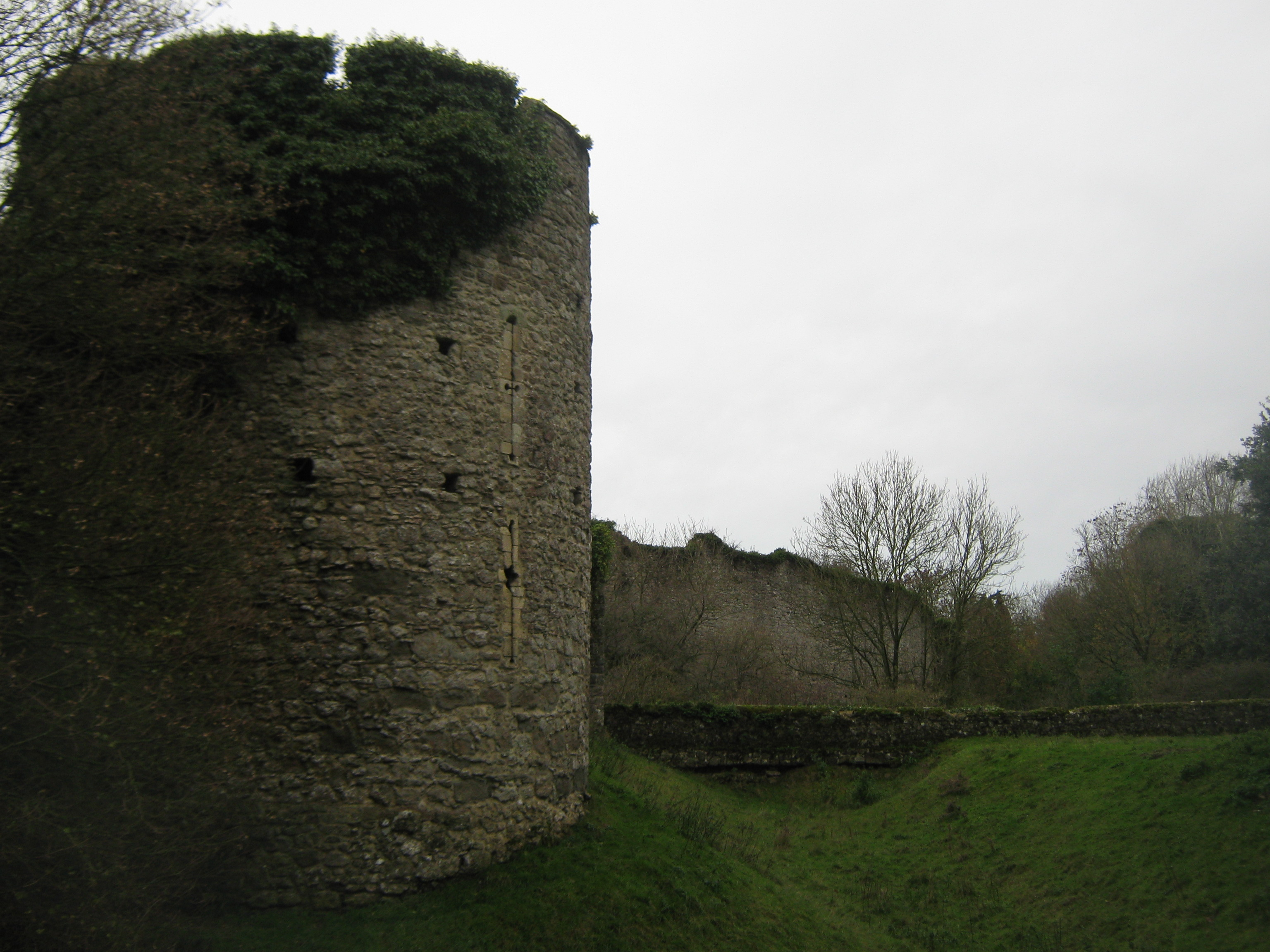
Walls of Saltwood Castle

The castle's site traces its history back to 488 AD, when Aesc, the son of Hengist and the King of Kent, is claimed to have built a castle on the site. It first appears, however, on a charter of King Egbert in 833. The manor of Saltwood was granted to the priory of Christ Church in Canterbury by a deed dated 1026. Under William of Normandy, Saltwood, held by the Archbishop of Canterbury and let, under knights’ service, to Hugo de Montfort, formed part of the string of large fiefs granted from Hythe to the New Forest, along the south coast of England. The structure was replaced by a twelfth-century Norman structure, with work extending over the next two centuries. It became the residence for a time of Henry of Essex, constable of England.

=== Becket ===
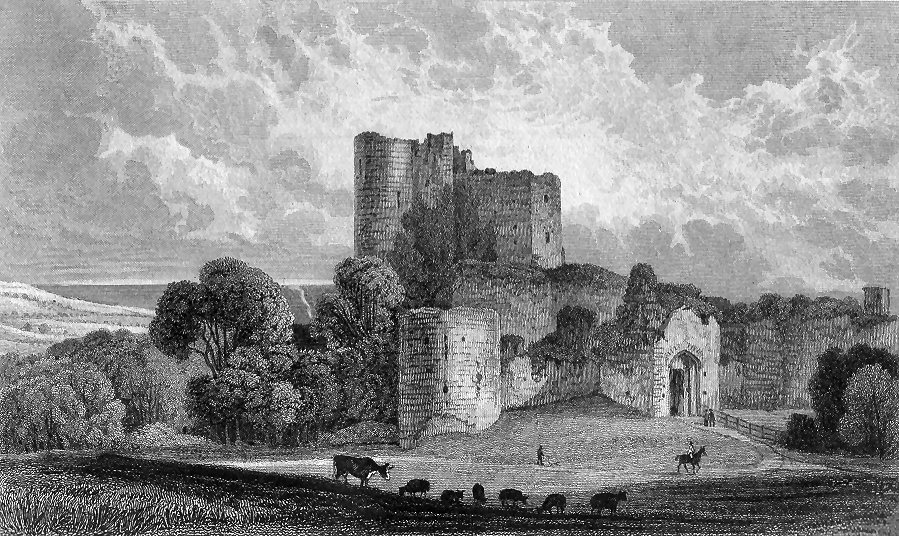
Saltwood Castle c. 1830 before the gatehouse was restored.

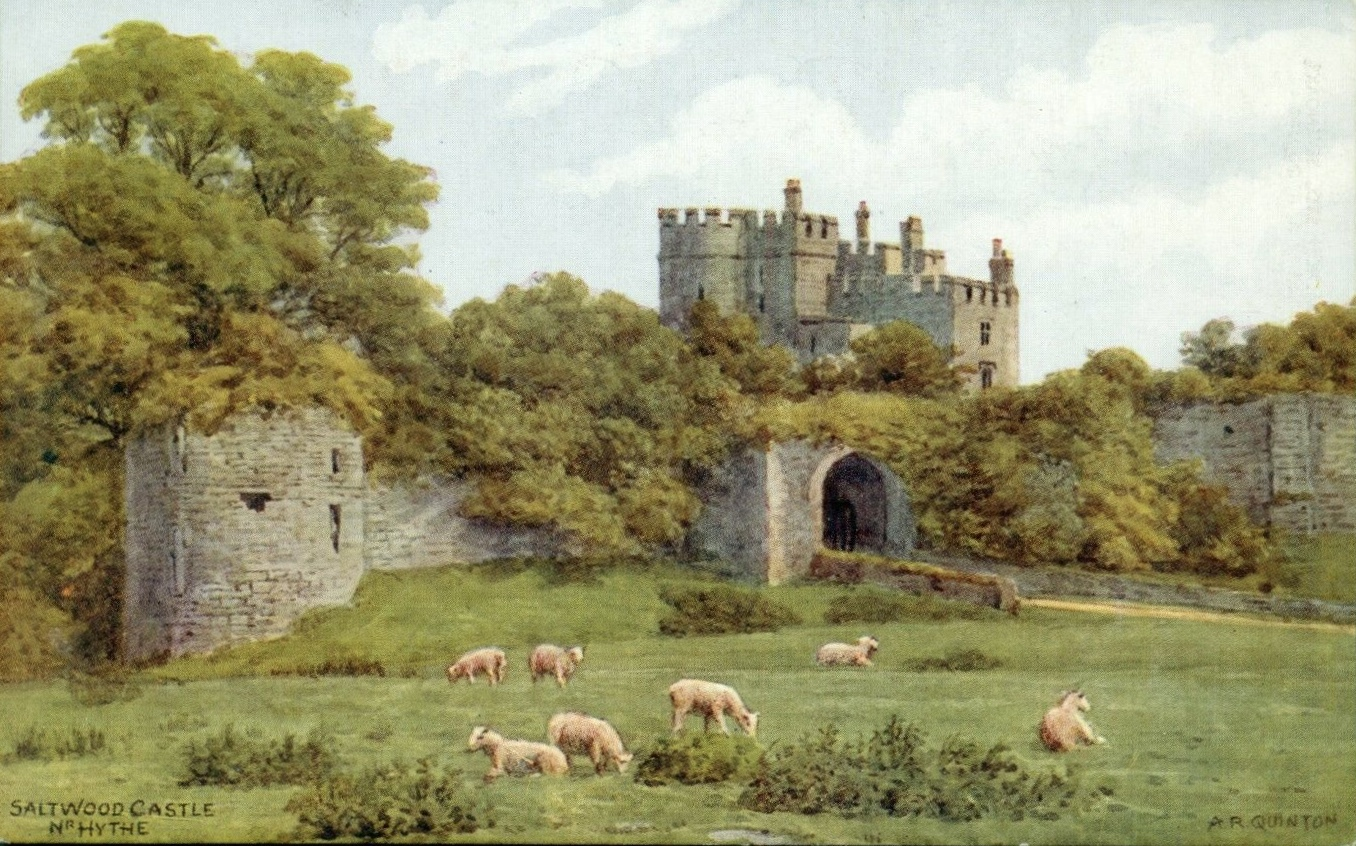
Saltwood Castle Nr. Hythe (postcard c.1920) by A. R. Quinton

Thomas Becket had asked Henry II on behalf of the Church for the restoration of the castle as an ecclesiastical palace. Henry instead gave it to one of his loyal barons named Ranulf de Broc. This leads to the implication that some complicity was possible in the murder of Becket by the baron Ranulf de Broc. It was during this time at Saltwood, on 28 December 1170, that four knights are presumed to have plotted the death of Becket, which took place the following day at Canterbury Cathedral, about 15 miles (24 km) away. Hugh de Moreville was one of the four knights that committed the assassination, along with Reginald Fitzurse, William de Tracey, and Richard le Breton.

=== Later medieval history ===
In the aftermath of the Revolt of 1173–1174 Saltwood Castle was demolished (slighted). During Richard I's reign, the king returned the castle to the archbishop of Canterbury.

Gun-ports in the gatehouse that date to the period 1385–94 are attributed to Henry Yevele (fl. 1353–1400), called the "English father of the science of artillery fortification" by B.H. St John O'Neil. A fourteenth-century chip-carved chest with arcading and rosettes along the front, with a later panelled top, formerly in the parish church, was reputed to have come originally from Saltwood Castle. The Wycliffite William Thorpe's account of his interrogation at Saltwood in 1407 is a familiar document because it was published by sixteenth-century Reformers.

=== Post-medieval history ===
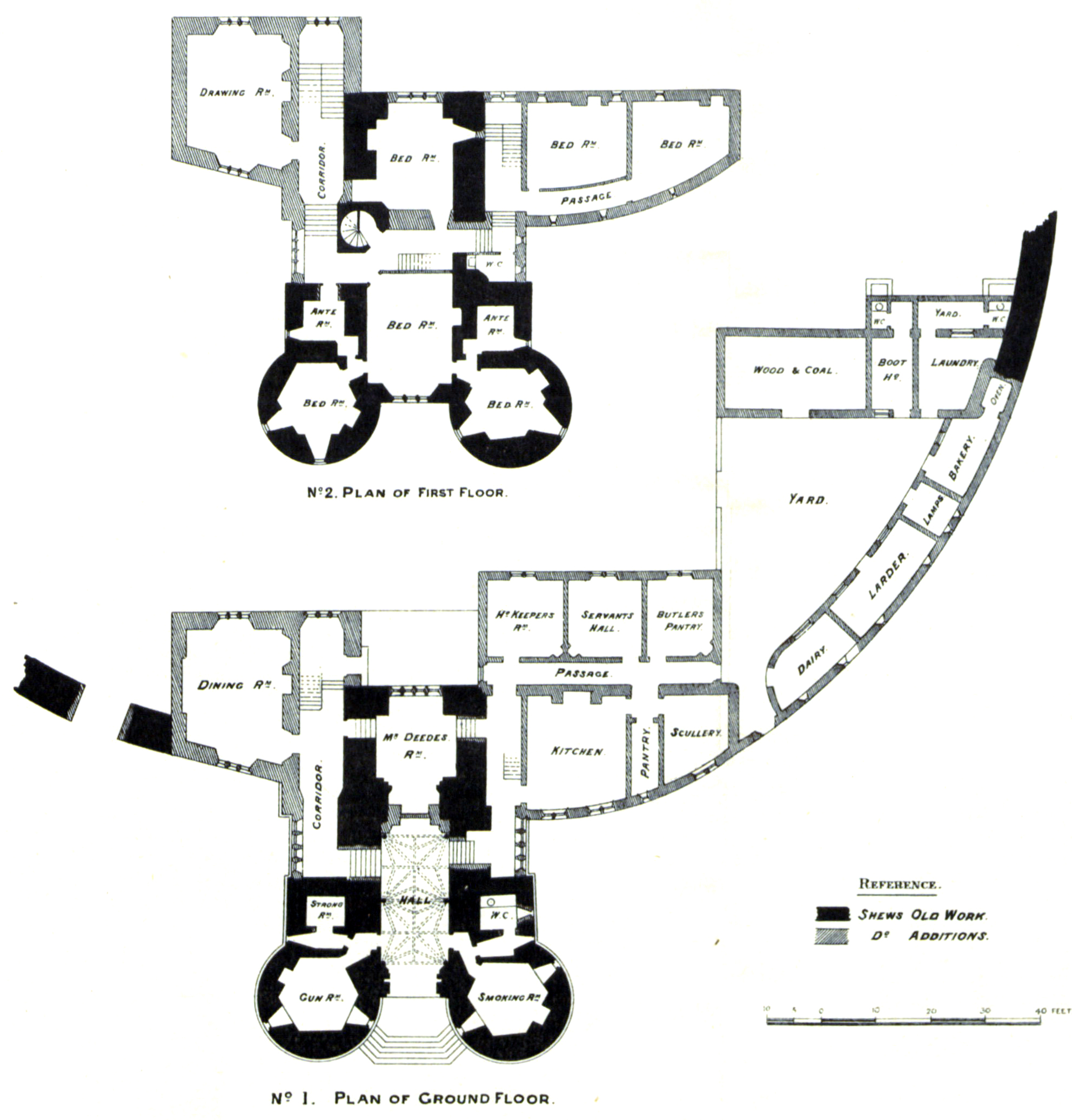
1885 diagram showing restoration of the gatehouse

Saltwood remained a church property until the reign of Henry VIII when Hythe and Saltwood were seized by the Crown. It became uninhabitable as the result of the earthquake of 6 April 1580, but was restored in the nineteenth century, as a residence once again of the Archbishop of Canterbury. The gatehouse has been used as a residence ever since.

The castle was the childhood home of Bill Deedes and was purchased in 1955 by Kenneth Clark, whose son Alan Clark subsequently lived there. In 1971–2, Lord Clark employed John King to construct a bungalow, The Garden House, at the edge of the moat, as a residence for him and his wife. After Alan Clark's death he was buried in the grounds of the castle, which remains in the Clark family today.

== See also ==
- Castles in Great Britain and Ireland
- List of castles in England

== Sources ==
- Brown, R. Allen (1959), "A List of Castles, 1154–1216", The English Historical Review, 74 (291): 249–280, doi:10.1093/EHR/LXXIV.291.249
- Emery, Anthony (2006). Greater Medieval Houses of England and Wales, 1300–1500: Volume 3, Southern England. Cambridge: Cambridge University Press. ISBN 978-0-521-58132-5.
- Newman, John (2013). Kent: North East and East. The Buildings of England. New Haven and London: Yale University Press. ISBN 978-0-300-18506-5.
