= Loughmoe Castle =

Ruined castle in County Tipperary, Ireland

Coordinates: 52.7549316°N 7.82644719°W

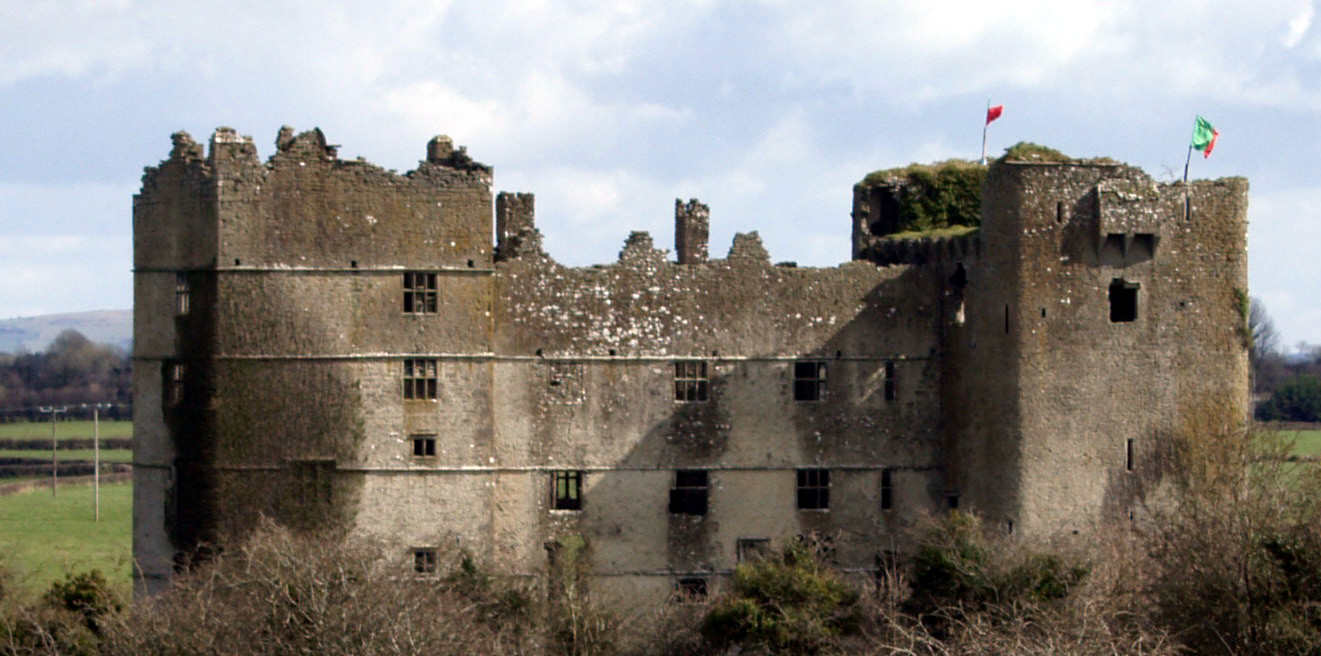
- Loughmoe Castle, 2008

- Location within Ireland
- Location: Loughmore, County Tipperary, Ireland

History
- Built: 1200s

Loughmoe Castle (Irish: Caisláin Luach Magh, also spelt Loughmore Castle) is a ruined castle in County Tipperary, Ireland. It is by Loughmore village, 5 km south of Templemore. The castle was the ancestral home of the Purcell family, the Barons of Loughmoe.

== Location ==
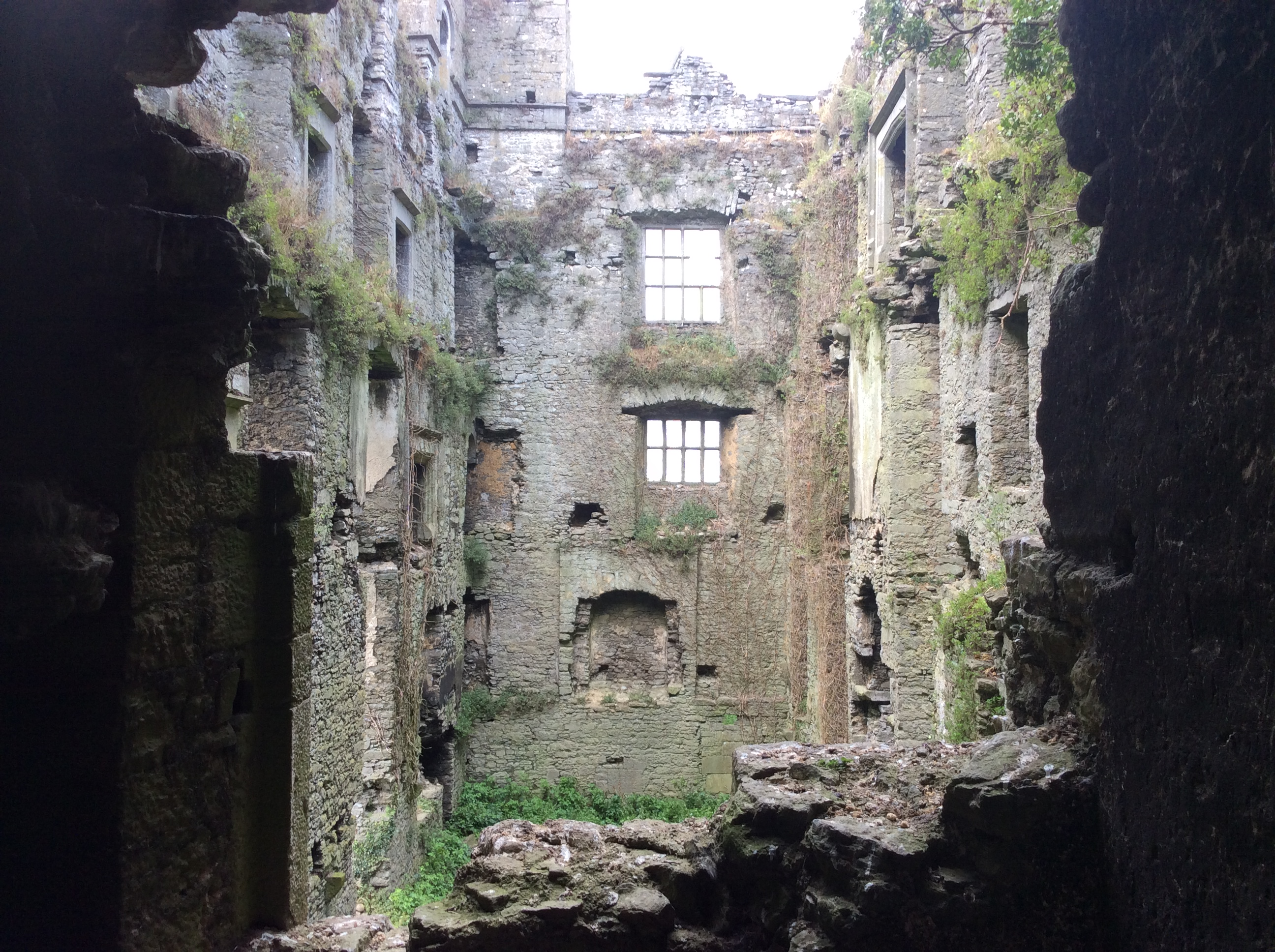
Interior, 2019

Loughmoe Castle is situated just outside the heart of Loughmore Village which is located between two townlands, 11.5 kilometres from Thurles and 5.5 kilometres from Templemore. The castle sits on flat ground between the River Suir and the Cork to Dublin Rail line where the castle is a visible feature for commuters.

== History ==
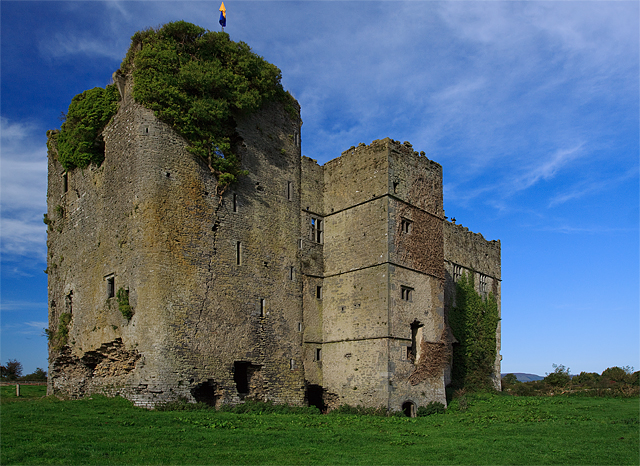
Viewed from Catholic church

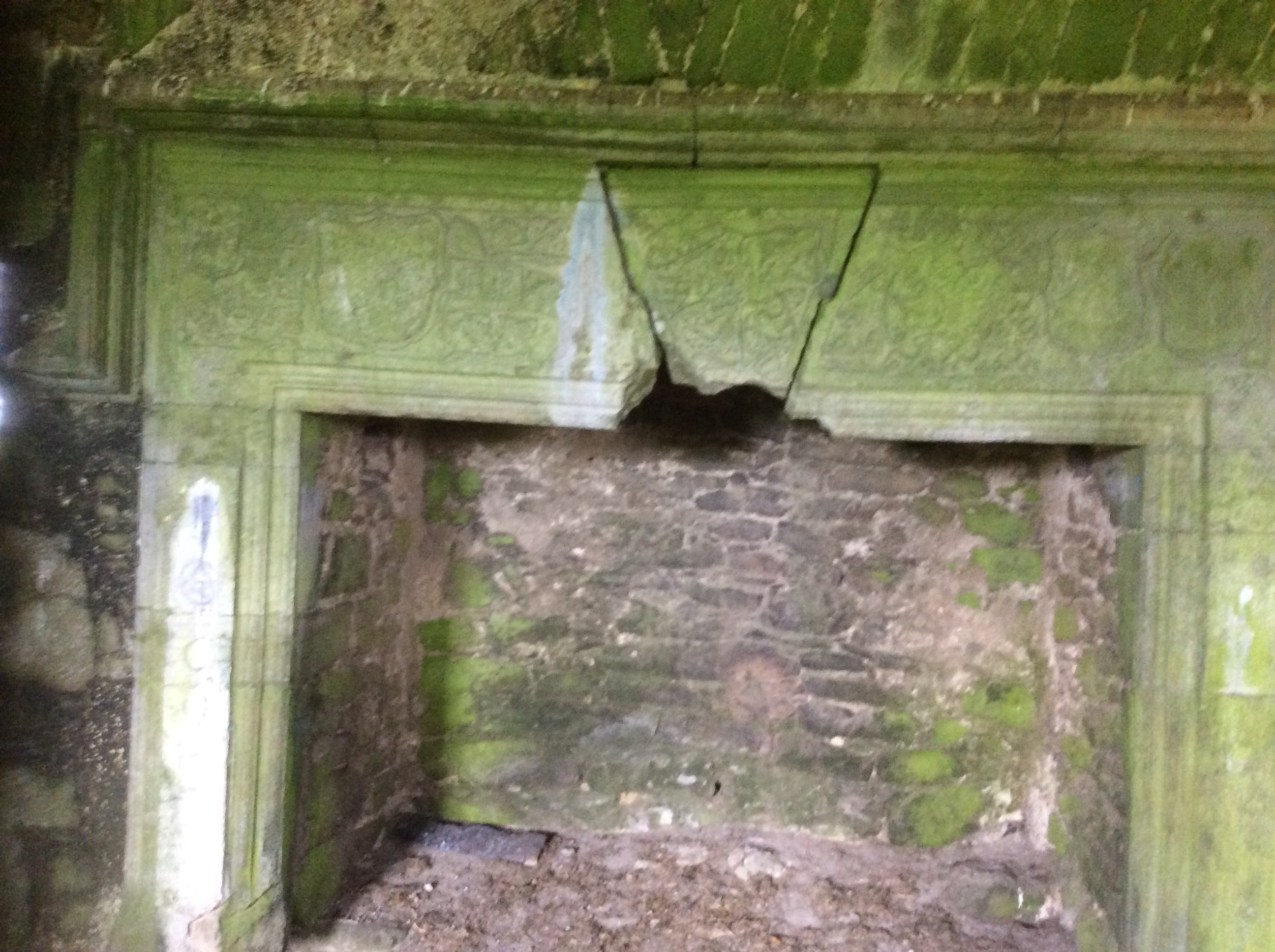
Fireplace in the Great Hall

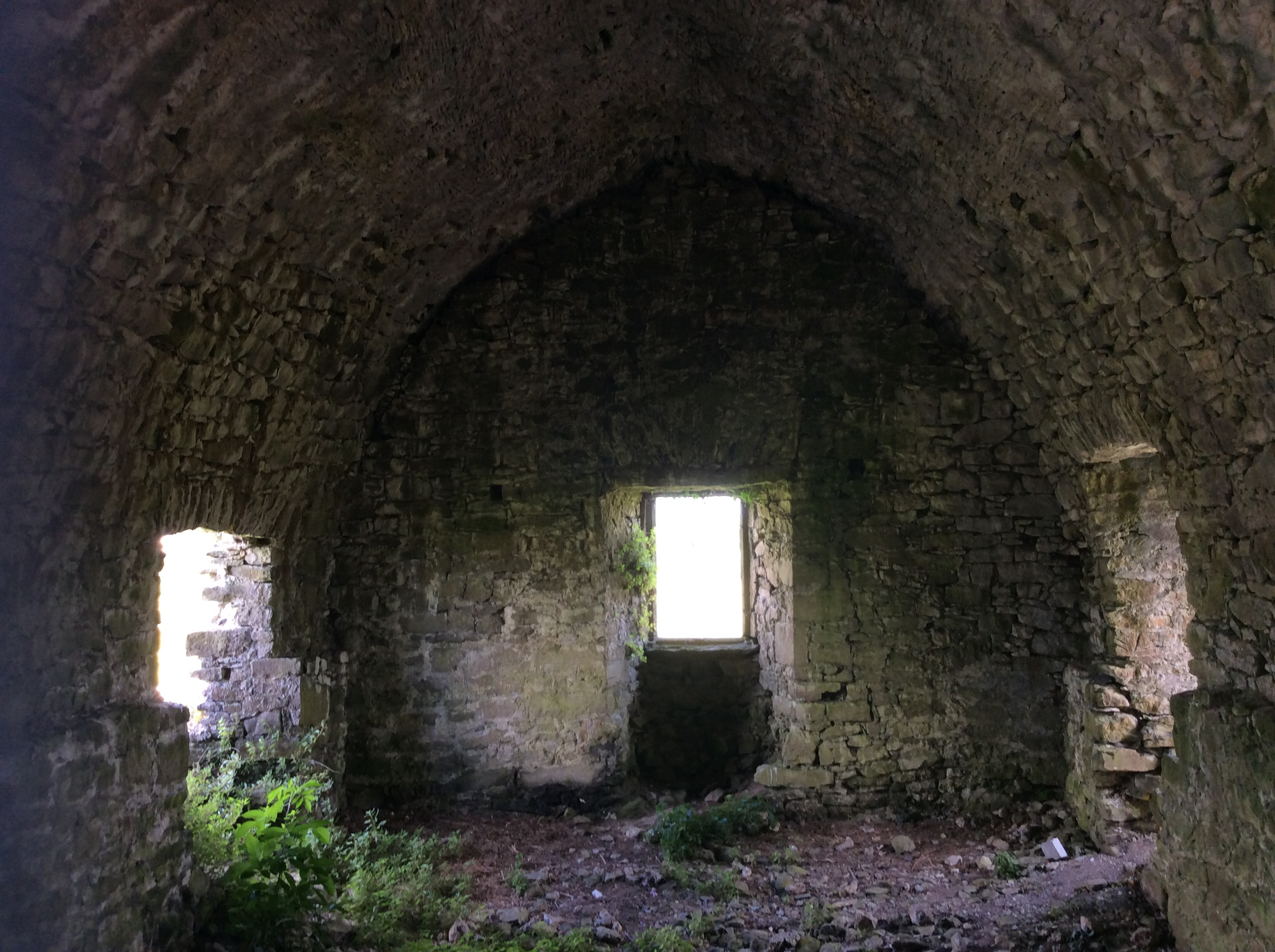
13th century tower house

The oldest part of the castle was built in the thirteenth century, and consists of a four-storey tower-house. Additions were made by the Purcell family in the seventeenth century. The family lived in Loughmoe Castle until around 1760. The land on which it was built was granted to Sir Hugh Purcell in 1204 as a dowry from Beatrix FitzWalter's father, Theobald FitzWalter. At the same time this was built, a mill was erected not far from the castle. The first Baron of Loughmoe was Sir Hugh Purcell, who was given the title by James Butler, first Earl of Ormonde and descendant of Theobald FitzWalter. The last Baron of Loughmoe, Nicholas Purcell of Loughmoe, died March 1722 and ended the Barony of Loughmoe.

== Castle folklore ==
A local folktale surrounds the castle, which has been attached to the castle for a number of years. The story entails how the Purcell family first gained ownership of the castle. The tale purports that when Loughmoe was covered in dense forestry and ruled by a king who resided in the Castle, a wild boar and sow terrorized the people of the parish. The king promised the man who killed the sow and boar, could marry his only daughter, and take ownership of the castle and the surrounding land. Many men tried and failed until a young man named Purcell requested to take on the challenge. Purcell searched all over the land of Loughmoe and beyond to find the boar and sow. Purcell found the sow first, this led to a battle in which Purcell would defeat the sow with a bow and arrow. As the sow died, its squeals caught the attention of the boar who was in another part of the forest. This led the boar to run through the forest, destroying everything in its path, to the very spot where Purcell had slayed the sow. Enraged, the boar ran straight for Purcell. Purcell took the bow and arrow and shot the boar in the jaw; this led the boar to run away and later die. The king kept to his word and granted Purcell the castle, the land of Loughmoe and his marriage to the king's daughter.

== Barons and Lords of Loughmoe ==
Lord of Loughmoe

- Sir Hugh Purcell

Baron of Loughmoe

- Richard Purcell, 1st Baron of Loughmoe (1328)
- Phillip Purcell of Loughmoe
- Geoffrey Rothe Purcell of Loughmoe (c.1397)
- Thomas Purcell of Loughmoe (c.1430)
- Peter Purcell of Loughmoe
- James Purcell of Loughmoe (c.1456)
- John Purcell of Loughmoe (c.1466)
- Thomas Purcell of Loughmoe (c.1518)
- Patrick Purcell of Loughmoe (c.1534)
- Thomas Purcell of Loughmoe (b.1538 d. 3 August 1607)
- Ralph Purcell of Loughmoe
- Richard Purcell of Loughmoe (d. 15 September 1624)
- Theobald Purcell of Loughmoe (b. 1595 flourished 1630 died 1644)
- James Purcell of Loughmoe, (b.1609, died 13 September 1652
- Nicholas Purcell of Loughmoe born (September 1652), died 4 March 1722

== See also ==
- Loughmore
