= Thomas Purcell of Loughmoe =

- Baron of Loughmoe
- Predecessor: Patrick Purcell
- Successor: Ralph Purcell
- Born: 1538
- Died: August 3, 1607 (aged 68–69)
- Wife: Joan Fitzpatrick
- Issue: Ralph Purcell, Richard Purcell, (Ellen Purcell) Butler, Mary (Purcell) Comerford, John Purcell, James Purcell
- Father: Patrick Purcell
- Mother: Johanna Rothe

Coat of Arms of the Barons of Loughmoe

Thomas Purcell, Baron of Loughmoe (1538 – c. 1607) was an Irish nobleman, who fought alongside Crown Forces during the Desmond Rebellions from 1569 to 1573 and again in from 1579 to 1583.

== Biography ==
Sir Thomas Purcell was born to Patrick Purcell and Johanna Rothe. He had a wife named Joan (Fitzpatrick) Purcell and fathered at least four sons and two daughters. Purcell was a member of the wealthy Purcell family, who were at the time a family of great import in the area. He was a Catholic.

In 1569 when the Desmond Rebellions occurred, Purcell and his followers, were among the forces who fought against them under the Crown Forces, commanded by Sir Henry Sidney and Thomas Butler, 10th Earl of Ormond. According to State papers he was described as "the Baron of Logmaye, chief of the Purcells in Tiberarye, a follower of the Butlers by force"

On the last day of the Second Desmond Rebellion, Purcell escaped from the fighting, ending his career in warfare. He retired as Baron of Loughmoe in 1599 and was succeeded by his son Ralph Purcell who died in 1610.

== Cumha Bharúin Loch Mór ==
Thomas' greatest legacy is most likely a 1599 harp composition he commissioned to be played at his funeral, titled 'Cumha Bharúin Loch Mór' (lit. 'the lament of/for the Baron of Loughmore'). (Note: In Edward Bunting's manuscripts, the title is given as 'Cooee Vareen Lagh Moor', but the title given previously is probably a more accurate transcription.) (Note: The name of the piece is incorrectly given as 'Cumha Caoine an Albanaigh', lit. ''Scott's Lamentation'', in Bunting's 1840 publication, 'The Ancient Music of Ireland', but this would be grammatically incorrect.) The lament was probably commissioned by Purcell for his impending death.

Purcell had written his last will in March 1597, John Scott composed his lament in 1599, and the Baron eventually died on 3 August 1607.

== Bibliography ==
- Bunting, Edward (1796). The Ancient Music of Ireland – via archive.org.
- Bunting, Edward (1805). Manuscript book of Irish airs – via Queen's University Belfast.
- Callanan, Martin; Moran, Paul (2004). "Papers of Dr Martin Callanan" (PDF). National Library of Ireland.
- Healy, William (1893). History and Antiquities of Kilkenny (County and City). Egan.
- Horan, Brien Purcell (2020). "A BRIEF HISTORY OF THE PURCELLS OF IRELAND".
- de Montmorency-Morres, Hervey (1817). Genealogical memoir of the family of Montmorency, styled De Marisco or Morres.
