= Loughmore =

Village in County Tipperary, Ireland

Loughmore Luach Maigh
- Village
- Motto(s): "Luach Maigh chun tosaigh" (Loughmore to the Fore)
- Location in Ireland
- Coordinates: 52°45′27″N 7°49′38″W
- Country: Ireland
- Province: Munster
- County: Tipperary
- Barony: Eliogarty
- Time zone: UTC+0 (WET)
  - Summer (DST): UTC-1 (IST (WEST))
- Website: www.loughmore.com

Loughmore, officially Loughmoe (/lɒxˈmoʊ/ lokh-MOH; Irish: Luach Maigh or Luachma), is a village in County Tipperary, Ireland. The village is best known for Loughmoe Castle, seat of the Barons of Loughmoe.

It is one half of the parish of Loughmore-Castleiney in the Roman Catholic Archdiocese of Cashel and Emly. Loughmoe gives its name to the civil parish of Loughmoe West which is in the historical barony of Eliogarty.

== Toponymy ==
The village's Irish-language name Luach Maigh (earlier: Luach-mhagh) means "reward-field". Today's Loughmore – which would correspond to Irish Loch Mór ("great lake") – is the result of a mistake made by British mapmakers of the 19th century. The Purcell family's Loughmoe Castle, near the village, retains a more accurate and older version of the name.

The arms of the Baron of Loughmoe

Certain localities in Ireland were given this name, probably because "in old times some tenant held them free of direct rent, as a reward for some signal service, or on condition of fulfilling some special duty". Local tradition has it that a king lived in the castle, and offered his daughter's hand to whoever could rid the land of a gigantic boar and sow that uprooted crops and killed anyone they met. A youth named Purcell killed the boar with a bow and arrow, and won the reward for himself and his descendants, and the area in which the Castle stands is known as "the field of the reward". The legend is alluded to in the Purcell family's coat of arms, which depicts the heads of four boars.

== Geography ==
Loughmore is on the banks of the River Suir some 5.5 km south of Templemore, 10 km north of Thurles and a kilometre east of the main N62 road between those towns. Castleiney is some 5 km away and closer to Templemore. The parish is in the Golden Vale, one of the richest agricultural areas in Europe. Dairy farming and cattle raising are the principal occupations.

== Transport ==
Loughmore lies on the Dublin – Cork/Limerick/Tralee railway line. The nearby Templemore railway station has direct trains to Cork, Dublin, Limerick and Tralee operated by Iarnród Éireann.

The N62 highway links Loughmore with the M8 motorway to Cork and the M7 to Dublin and Limerick.

Loughmore's central location puts it within 90 minutes' drive of three international airports: Cork, Dublin and Shannon.

== History ==
=== Loughmore Castle ===
Loughmoe Castle was the seat of the Purcell family, who were Barons of Loughmoe. Construction of the castle began in 1328, the year that the family were granted the title of Barons of Loughmoe. Until the 1980s it was possible to climb the spiral stair in the right-hand tower. The monument is now in the care of the Office of Public Works.

The title Baron of Loughmoe is an Irish feudal barony, and was possibly raised to a Jacobite peerage in 1690 while King James II of England was in exile. The feudal title was first granted to Richard Purcell in 1328 by James Butler, 1st Earl of Ormond as palatine Lord of Tipperary. Irish and Scottish feudal titles, particularly those granted by palatine lords, are acknowledged as genuine hereditaments by the arms granting bodies of Ireland, Scotland, and England, but were never formally recognised by the British Crown.

Referring to the Purcells of Loughmoe specifically, the medieval Irish genealogist Dubhaltach Mac Fhirbhisigh wrote that Purcell genealogy begins with Charlemagne, Emperor of the Holy Roman Empire.

=== The Cormack Brothers ===
In 1858 in Loughmore, two local men, Daniel and William Cormack, were executed for the murder of John Ellis, a land agent from Kilrush, near Templemore, County Tipperary. Ellis was hated for evicting tenants on behalf of the landlords who employed him. One night as he returned along the lane to his isolated home, his way was blocked by uprooted bushes and branches. He was shot by a hidden assailant and died an hour later.

The police had no doubt that this was a political murder, because £90 in Ellis’s wallet was left untouched. The brothers William and Daniel Cormack were arrested and convicted at Nenagh Assizes in March 1858, largely, it was felt at the time, on the evidence of an informer – "a villainous character" – who was widely believed to have been part of the murder plot. The judge was the notoriously corrupt and harsh William Keogh.

The common belief was that a local landlord had shot Ellis in a crime of passion involving Ellis' sister, and that the Cormack brothers had been framed for murder; 2,357 people signed a petition attesting to the brothers' innocence

The brothers were hanged on Thursday, 11 May 1858 outside Nenagh Prison.

Daniel Cormack addressed the crowd at the public execution from the scaffold, saying: "Lord have mercy on me, for you know, Jesus, that I neither had hand, act, nor part in that for which I am about to die. Good people, pray for me." According to a contemporary report, "the brother having made the same awful declaration, both were in the next moment launched into eternity".

Years later a tenant named Michael Gleeson, who had been evicted by Ellis, confessed to the murder.

In 1910 a committee was formed in Loughmore to exhume the brothers and rebury them in the churchyard. Daniel's and William's remains were ceremonially removed from Nenagh Gaol and brought back to Loughmore with two hearses drawn by plumed horses, followed by huge crowds. After the procession arrived in the village, the Cormack brothers were buried in a mausoleum in the churchyard where people still go to see the original oak coffins and the inscription proclaiming their innocence.

On one side of the mausoleum is inscribed:

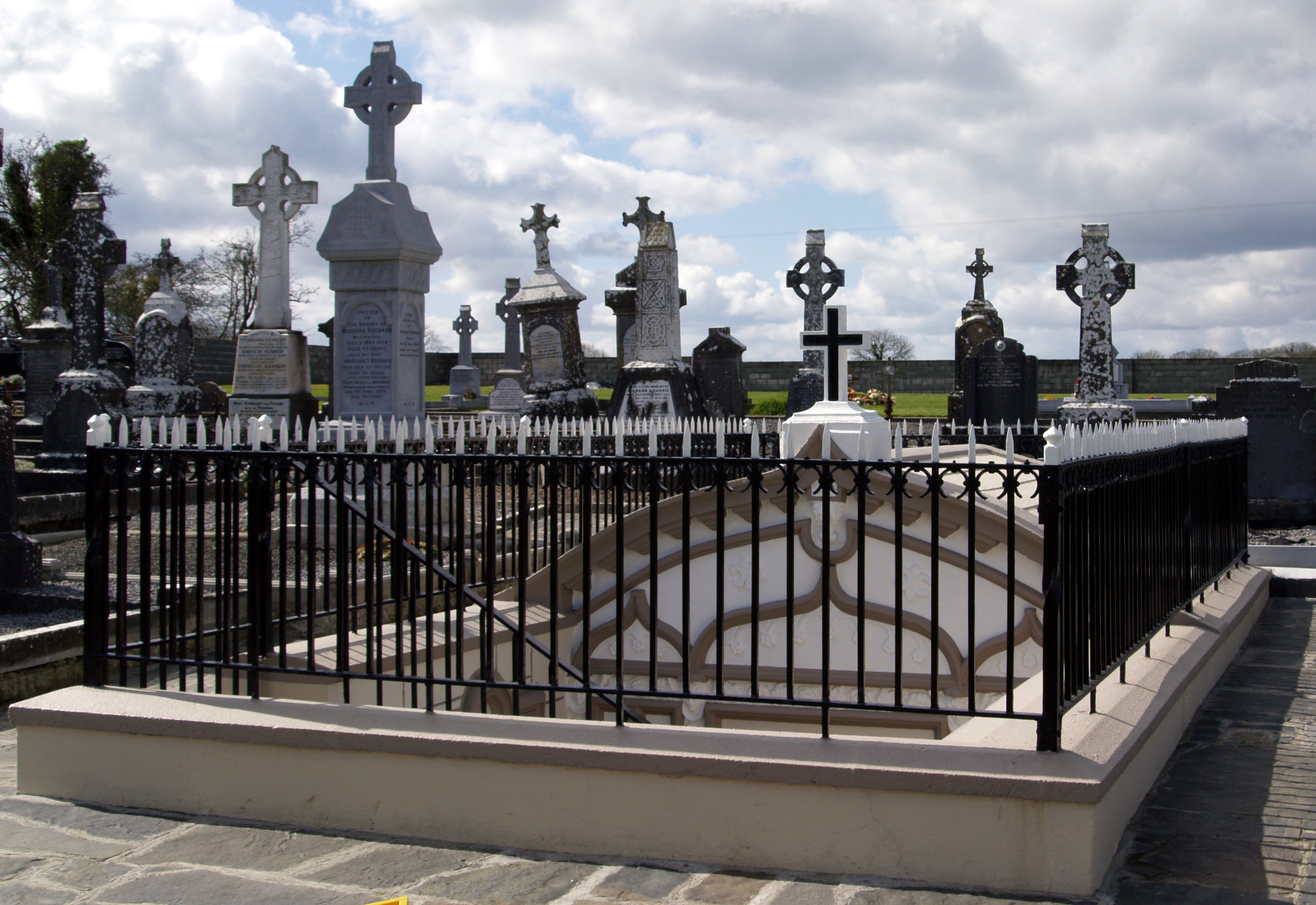
Mausoleum in Loughmore Churchyard in memory of McCormack Brothers

By the Irish Race in memory of the brothers DANIEL and WILLIAM CORMACK who for the murder of a land agent named ELLIS were hanged at NENAGH after solemn protestation by each on the scaffold of absolute and entire innocence of that crime, the 11th day of May 1858. The tragedy of the brothers occurred through false testimony procured through GOLD and terror, the action in their trial of JUDGE KEOGH, a man who considered personally, politically, religiously and officially was one of the monsters of mankind, and the verdict of a prejudiced, partisan packed perjured jury. Clear proof of the innocence of the brothers afforded by ARCHBISHOP LEAHY to the VICEROY of the day but he nevertheless gratified the appetite of a bigoted, exterminating and ascendancy caste by a judicial murder of the kind which lives bitterly and perpetually in a nation’s remembrance. Corpora sanctorum in pace sepulta sunt: et vivent nomina eorum in aeternum R.I.P. [Which translates as: The bodies of the saints are buried in peace; and their names live for evermore. R.I.P.]

Inscribed on the other side:

In commemoration of the removal of the remains of the CORMACK BROTHERS from the jailyard at NENAGH to this mausoleum on May 11, 1910. In the morning a solemn REQUIEM OFFICE and HIGH MASS were celebrated in the Parish Church, Nenagh, Canon McMahon presiding, and an immense number of Killaloe priests being in the choir. The funeral cortege which contained MR JOHN DILLON, M.P., MR J. HACKETT, M.P., and many others of high name and inspiring example, was by magnitude, representativeness and observance unprecedented in IRELAND. At Loughmore, the pastor preached a funeral oration and assisted by priests from IRELAND, ENGLAND, AMERICA and AUSTRALIA, officiated at the placing of the remains here to rest in peace and honour until the day of their vindication by Jesus Christ before the whole human race in the Valley of Josophat. Visi sunt oculis insipientium mori illi autem sunt in pace. [Which translates as: "In the sight of the unwise they seem to die, but they are in peace". Taken, with some modifications, from the Book of Wisdom, chapter 3, verses 2-3]

On June 23rd, 1919, RIC District Inspector Michael Hunt was shot in Thurles during the War of Independence. The shooter “Big Jim” Stapleton from nearby Upperchurch fired three shots, killing Hunt and also accidentally shooting a child from Loughmore, Danny Maher. Maher survived the shooting and lived until the 1980s.

== Sport ==
Loughmore–Castleiney GAA is the local Gaelic Athletic Association club and has traditionally been a Gaelic football club but also has a hurling team. The parish is known as a "football island" in mid-Tipperary as it is surrounded by clubs that play hurling only. In 2013, the parish won the Tipperary Senior Hurling Championship for the third time. Loughmore-Castleiney won the Munster Club Senior Hurling Championship in 2007. It has won the Tipperary Senior Football Championship 12 times, last winning it in 2024. Loughmore got the first double in the county by winning the senior hurling and football county finals in 2013.

Loughmore is the home of a number of sportspeople, including the All-Ireland Minor Football Championship winning captain Liam McGrath (2011) and two time GAA GPA All Stars Awards winner Noel McGrath. The club provided Jim Ryan and Bill Ryan (Laha) to the Tipperary team that played in Croke Park on Bloody Sunday against Dublin in November, 1920 when their playing colleague Michael Hogan of Grangemockler was one of 15 people shot and killed by British forces who fired on the crowd and team.

== Notable people ==
- John Cormack, hurler
- John Kelly, Olympian racewalker
- John McGrath, hurler
- Liam McGrath, hurler
- Noel McGrath, hurler
- Pat McGrath, hurler
- John Meagher, hurler
- Kathleen Nesbitt, award-winning fiddler.
- Máiréad Nesbitt, violinist with Celtic Woman
- Paul Ormond, hurler & Gaelic footballer
- Nicholas Purcell, landlord & soldier
- Thomas Purcell, landlord
- Hanna Sheehy-Skeffington, feminist, suffragette, activist
- Michéal Webster, hurler

== See also ==
- List of towns and villages in Ireland
