= Twomileborris (electoral division) =

Electoral division in County Tipperary, Ireland

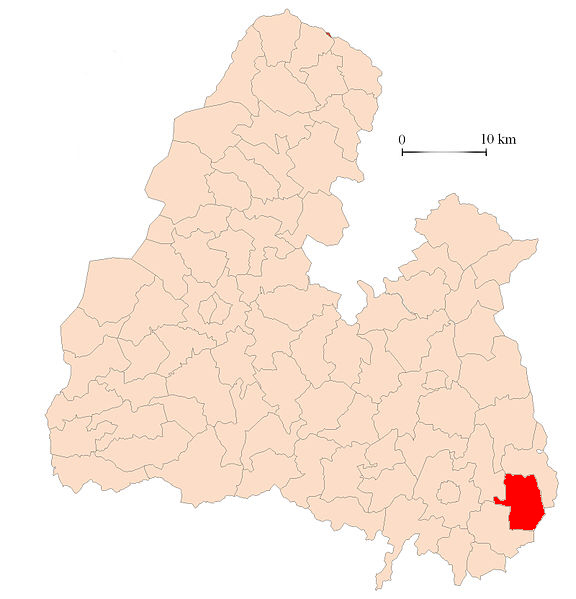
Location and extent of the division

Originally called Burris poor law electoral division, and sometimes called Borrisleigh in the past, this electoral division in County Tipperary in Ireland is now known as Twomileborris.

== Extent ==
This electoral division comprises the townlands of Blackcastle, Borris, Clooncleagh, Leigh, Newhill and Noard. (The map of the division given the Central Statistics Office website does not include the two very small exclaves of Borris townland which are surrounded by Garraun townland. This is probably an error since, at the time provision was first made for the creation of divisions, the legislation, dated 15 March 1839, provided that townlands should not be divided between electoral divisions. In any event, the issue does not, at present, have practical consequences since, at present, there are no dwellings, and therefore no residents, in these two exclaves.)

The division should not be confused with either the village of Twomileborris or the civil parish of Borrisleigh because it is a distinct entity. The division contains only the north-eastern section of the civil parish, the rest of which is in the neighbouring divisions of Littleton and Rahelty; although Twomileborris division contains most of the village of the same name, it does not contain all of it; the new housing area of Dún Na Rí is actually in the townland of Garraun which, although part of Borrisleigh civil parish, is actually in Rahelty electoral division.

== History ==
Twomileborris (Burris/Borrisleigh) electoral division was originally created in 1839, as an electoral division in the Thurles poor law union in North Tipperary. Although the poor law unions have long been abolished, this electoral division is still used for various administrative purposes, although with boundaries that have been modified over the years.

It would appear that Borrisleigh electoral division must have been reduced in size over the years because, when Thurles poor law union was created in 1839, Littleton electoral division, which now contains much of the land belonging to Borrisleigh civil parish, was not created. It is likely, therefore, that, when Littleton division was created, land was taken from Borrisleigh division. However, by the time of the 1891 census, the division had been assigned its current extent, although this may have happened even earlier.

== Population ==
At the time of the 1891 census, the population of this electoral division was 497. In 1901, it had dropped to 437. It had increased again by 1911, when there were 475 people in the division, of which 237 were male and 238 female.

The total population in the division at the time of the 2011 census was 807, of which males numbered 420 and females were 387. The total housing stock was 305, of which vacant households numbered 25.
