= Twomileborris (civil parish) =

Twomileborris Borrisleigh
- Civil Parish
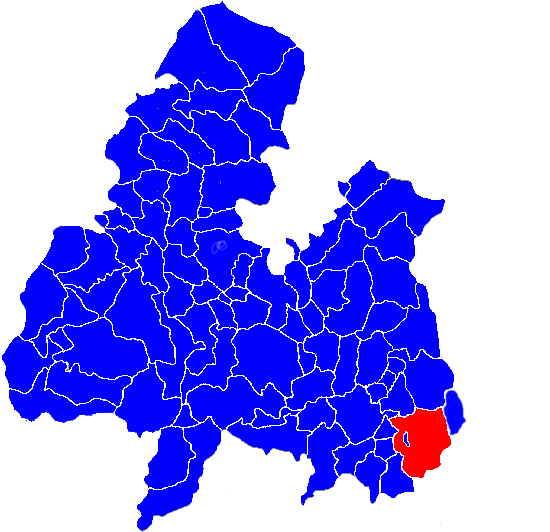
- Location of Twomileborris within the civil parishes of north Tipperary, showing the enclave of Ballymoreen

- Location in Ireland
- Coordinates: 52°39′19″N 7°43′06″W
- Country: Ireland
- Province: Munster
- County: County Tipperary
- Time zone: UTC+0 (WET)
  - Summer (DST): UTC-1 (IST (WEST))

Twomileborris (also known as Two-Mile Burris and Borrisleigh) is a civil parish in the barony of Eliogarty, County Tipperary.

The river Liscaveen forms some of the boundary between it and the parish of Ballymoreen; Twomileborris contains an enclave belonging to the latter parish, comprising the townland of Rathcunikeen.

== Geography ==
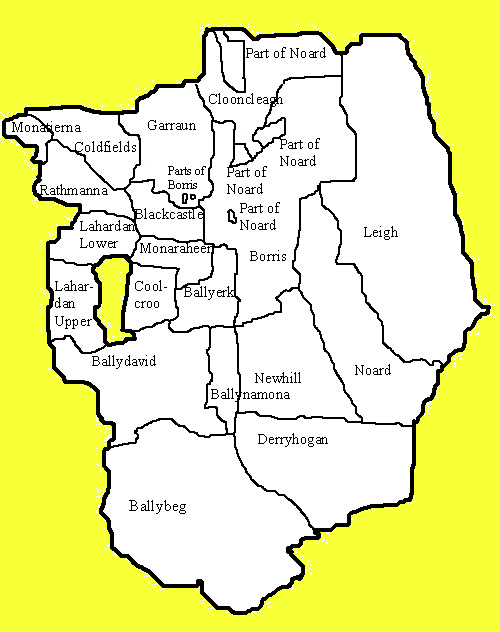
Townlands of Twomileborris civil parish. Notice the enclave of Rathcunikeen (which belongs to Ballymoreen) in the west of the parish between Lahardan Upper and Coolcroo

The parish comprises 7988 statute acres and is divided into nineteen townlands:

Townlands in Twomileborris civil parish
Townland	Notes
Ballybeg	Containing part of Littleton village, its namesake
Ballydavid	Containing part of Littleton village
Ballyerk
Ballynamona
Blackcastle
Borris	Containing Twomileborris village
Clooncleagh
Coldfields
Coolcroo
Derryhogan
Garraun
Lahardan Lower
Lahardan Upper
Leigh	Containing the ruins of Leamakevoge monastery
Monaraheen
Monatierna
Newhill
Noard	Including four detached parts separate from the main body of the townland
Rathmanna

According to Samuel Lewis, in 1837 the Church of Ireland living was a rectory in the diocese of Cashel, formed at a time earlier than extant records by uniting the vicarages of Boly or Galvoly (civil parish of Galbooly) and Drom with the chapelry of Leogh (Leigh). There are two villages in the parish: Two-Mile Borris and Littleton.

== Etymology ==
The English-language name 'Borrisleigh' is derived from the Irish-language Buiríos Léith, as is the last word in the alternative English-language name for the parish, Two-Mile Burris.
