= Rahelty =

Rahelty, sometimes written Rahealty, may refer to:

== Places in County Tipperary, Ireland ==
- Rahelty (civil parish), in County Tipperary
- Rahelty (townland), a townland in the above parish
- Rahelty (electoral division)

== Places in County Kilkenny, Ireland ==
- Rahelty, County Kilkenny, a townland in County Kilkenny
