= Garraun (Tipperary) =

Townland in Tipperary, Ireland

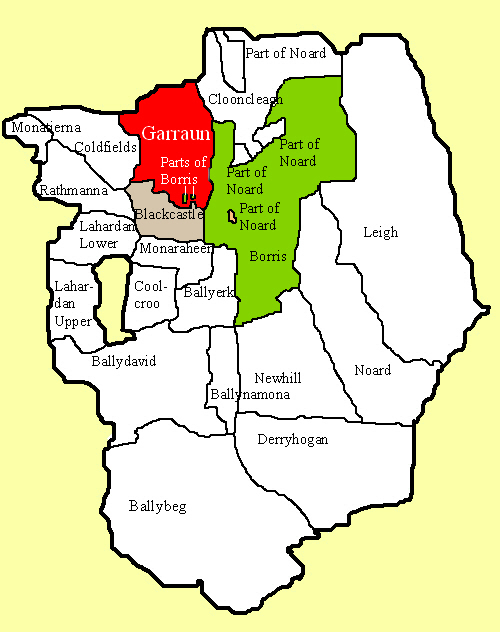
Outline map of Borrisleigh parish, showing Garraun townland (red) and the fact that it contains exclaves of the neighbouring townland of Borris

Garraun is a townland, containing a little over 567 acres, in Twomileborris civil parish in County Tipperary.

In its south-eastern corner it encloses two very small exclaves of the neighbouring townland of Borris. In recent years, the village of Two-Mile Borris, whose core is in Borris townland, has expanded westwards across the townland boundary, with the result that south-eastern Garraun now contains part of the village, in the shape of a new housing area called Dún na Rí.

Although Garraun is in Borrisleigh civil parish, it is not in the electoral division of the same name (which is now more commonly called Twomileborris); instead, it is in Rahelty electoral division.

== Population ==
At the time of the 1891 census, the townland had 61 inhabitants. The population had dropped slightly to 59 by 1901 and had dropped again by 1911, when there were only 36 inhabitants, of whom 18 were male and 18 female. This trend has been reversed in recent years, primarily due to the construction of the new housing area called Dún na Rí which was mentioned above, most of whose houses were built in the south-eastern corner of Garraun, just south of the two enclaves of Borris (although some of the houses are actually in a finger of Blackcastle townland which projects into the south-eastern corner of Garraun).

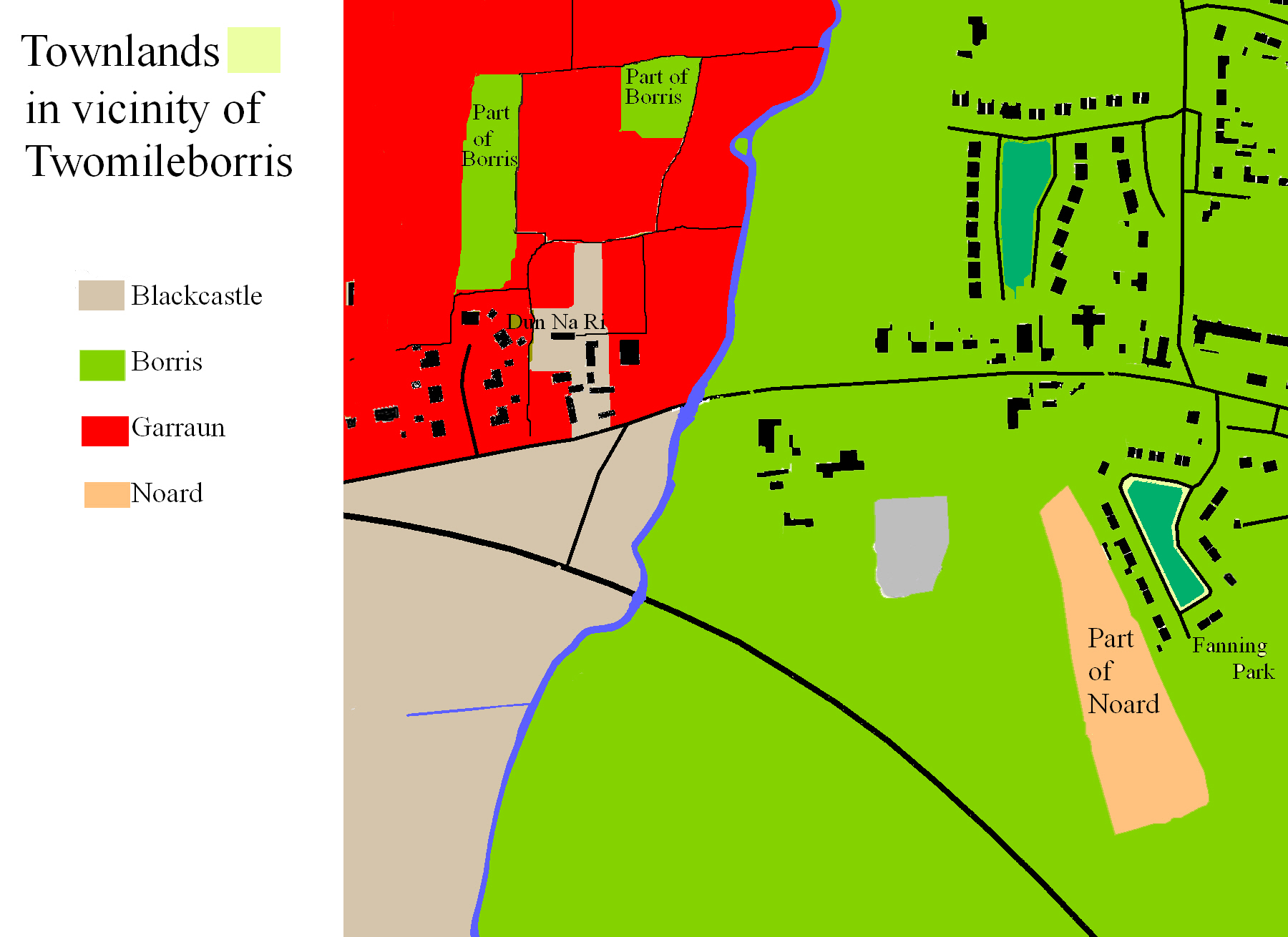
The south-eastern corner of Garraun (red) and its environs

It is not possible to give a figure for the population of Garraun townland at the time of the 2011 census, because the website of the Irish Central Statistics Office merges the townland into "small Area number 217145002", which also includes the townlands of Coldfields and Rathmanna (also from Borrisleigh civil parish), as well as those of Loughbeg and Lisduff (from Rahelty civil parish) and Ballygammane (from Thurles civil parish). An indication of the population trend can, however, be seen by comparing the 2011 figures for the "small area" with the total figures for its constituent townlands at the time of previous censuses. In 1891 these townlands, taken together, had a total population of 163, which dropped to 153 in 1901 and dropped further in 1911, to 147 of which 79 were male and 68 female. In 2011, the total population for the "small area" had risen, to 241, of which males numbered 123 and females 118. Most of this increase is due to the construction of Dún na Rí.
