= Garraun =

Garraun may refer to:

- Garraun (Tipperary), a townland in North Tipperary
- Garraun (Galway), a 598-metre mountain in Connemara, Ireland
- Garraun Point, on Great Blasket Island, County Kerry, Ireland

== See also ==
- Garraunbaun, a 406-metre mountain in County Laois, Ireland
- Garran, a suburb in Canberra in the Australian Capital Territory
- Garron, a type of a small sturdy horse or pony.
