= Mochoemoc =

Early Irish saint

Saint Mochoemoc
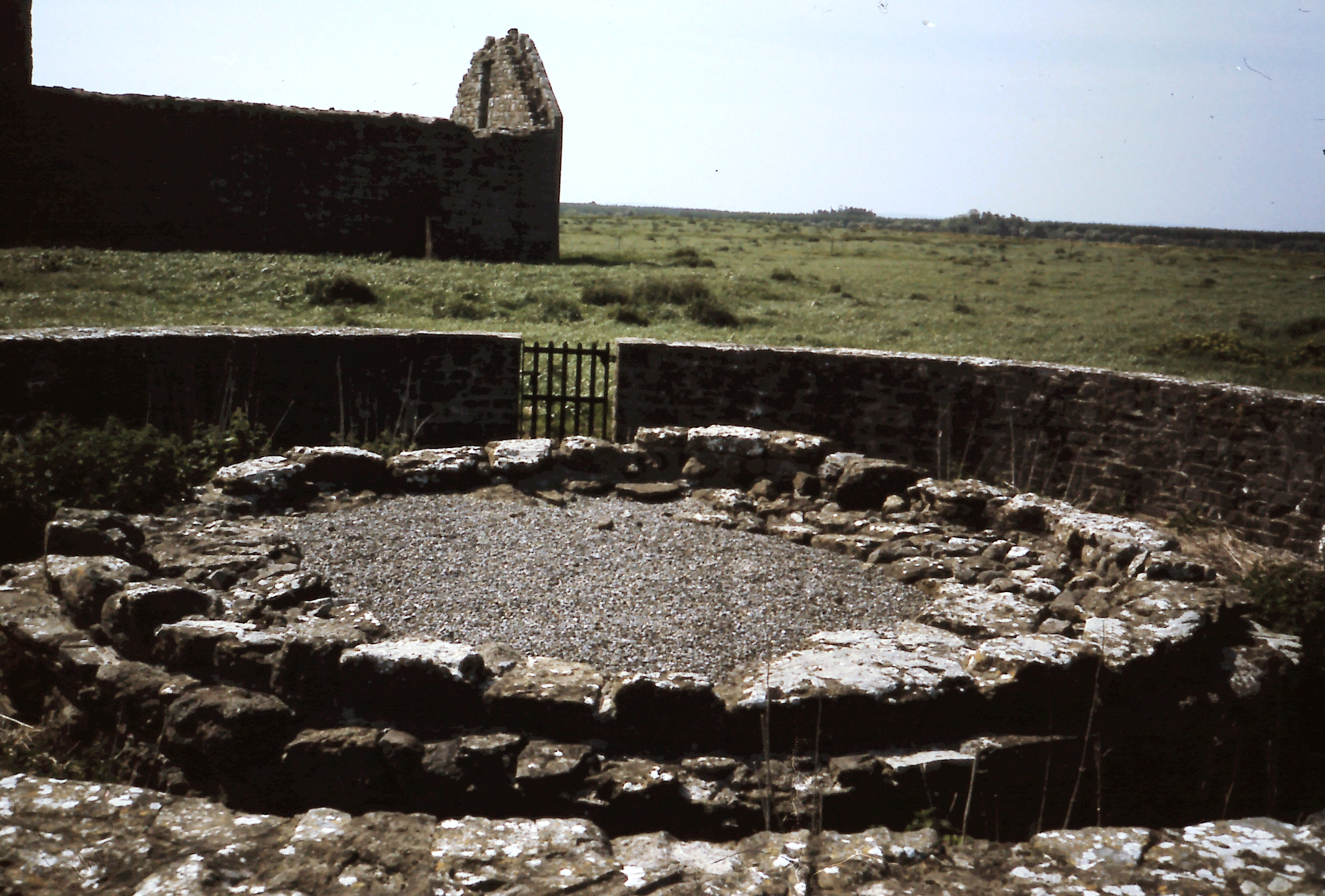
- Foundations of a round tower at Liathmore
- Born: c. 550; Hy-Conall-Gaura, County Limerick
- Died: 656; Liathmore, County Tipperary
- Feast: 13 March

Saint Mochoemoc (or Pulcherius, (Note: Other forms of the saint's name include Caomhán Leith, Mo Chóemóc mac Béoáin, Mochaemhog, Mochaomhog, Mo-Chaomhog, Mochaomhóg, Mochoemhoc and Vulcanius.) (Note: The old Celts of Ireland and Scotland had a habit of placing the pronoun mo (my) before the names of their favourite saints as a term of affection. Caomh in Irish means comely or mild, and is sometimes translated into the Latin Pulcherius. Fifteen Irish saints are called Caomhán, the diminutive form of the name.) (Note: The Oxford Dictionary of Saints says that Saint Kevoca, after whom the church of Quivox is named, often thought to be Scottish, was in fact Mochoemoc. However, another source identifies St Quivox with Santa Kennocha Virgo in Coila, or Saint Kennocha.) c. 550–656) was an early Irish abbot, later considered to have been a saint. He was a nephew of Saint Íte of Killeedy, who raised him. He became a monk in Bangor Abbey under the abbot Saint Comgall of Bangor. He was the founding abbot of Liath-Mochoemoc (Liathmore) monastery. His feast day is 13 March.

== Life ==
Locations in Ireland

Saint Mochoemoc or Pulcherius was born about 550 AD. His parents were a craftsman named Beoanus and Nesse, sister of Saint Íte of Killeedy. His father was born in Connemara in Connaught, and settled in Hui Conaill Gabhra in the south of County Limerick near Killeedy, where Saint Ita lived. It is said that Saint Fachtna of Ross Ailither was cured of an affection of his eyes by bathing them in the milk of Mochaemog's mother. (Note: Mochaemog, his mother and his aunt were all credited with the ability to cure blindness.) He was brought up by Saint Ite, then at the age of 20 was sent to Bangor Abbey where he was further instructed by the abbot Saint Comgall of Bangor.

Mochoemoc was sent out by Comgall as a missionary accompanied by the saints Laichtin, Molua Mac Ochai (a Findbarr) and Luchtigern. He built cells for his monks at Anatrim. He reached southern Éile in County Tipperary, where a chieftain granted him a site for a monastery in the forest near Lake Lurgan, since known as Liathmochaemog (Liathmore) in the parish of Two-Mile Borris, Barony of Eliogarty. He quarrelled with Faílbe Flann mac Áedo Duib, king of Munster (619-634), but all the saints of Ireland appeared to the king in visions and forced him to treat Mochaemog with respect. Failbhe was succeeded by Ronan, son of Bledin, who was hostile to Mochaemog but renewed his grant.

Saint Dagán was brought to the school of Machoemoc at Liathmore when he was very young. There is a legend that while Dagán was still a boy, some raiders from Osraige killed him. His decapitated body and his head were taken to Pulcherius, who had promised to give the boy Holy Communion before he died. Saint Cainnech of Aghaboe, who was present, placed the head in its position on the body and prayed to Christ, who restored life to Dagán. Pulcherius gave him Holy Communion, and Dagán lived for many more years as head of a large monastery in Inverdaoile. Dagan of Inverdaoile was known as a violent opponent of the Roman Easter.

Mochaemog was a friend of Saint Colmán of Dromore, whose monastery was just 4 miles (6.4 km) away, and of Saint Fursey. There is a story that the saints Pulcherius, Canice, Molua and Mofecta or Feachtna (Note: Fachtna of Iverk and Feachna, Sapiens, were either the same person or two contemporary monks in the community of Pulcherius, and were not the same as Bishop Fachtnan of Ross.) visited a monk named Mochumb at the church of Tifeachna (Note: Tifeaghna is a graveyard in County Kilkenny. It is in the Barony of Galmoy, the Parish of Sheffin and the Poor Law Union of Urlingford.) The saints stayed there for a while, then before leaving each placed a stone, one above the other, to commemorate the visit. John Francis Shearman (1879) wrote that "Thirty years ago there was at Tifeachna, on the western side of the churchyard, a pyramidical-shaped monument, built of small truncated codes, placed loosely one on top of the other, they are probably the memorials ferrred to in the aforesaid chapter."

Pulcherius was said to have lived to a great age, and died in Liathmore on 13 March 656. There is a church named after Mochaemog in the Barony of Ida, County Kilkenny.

== Birth: Colgan's account ==
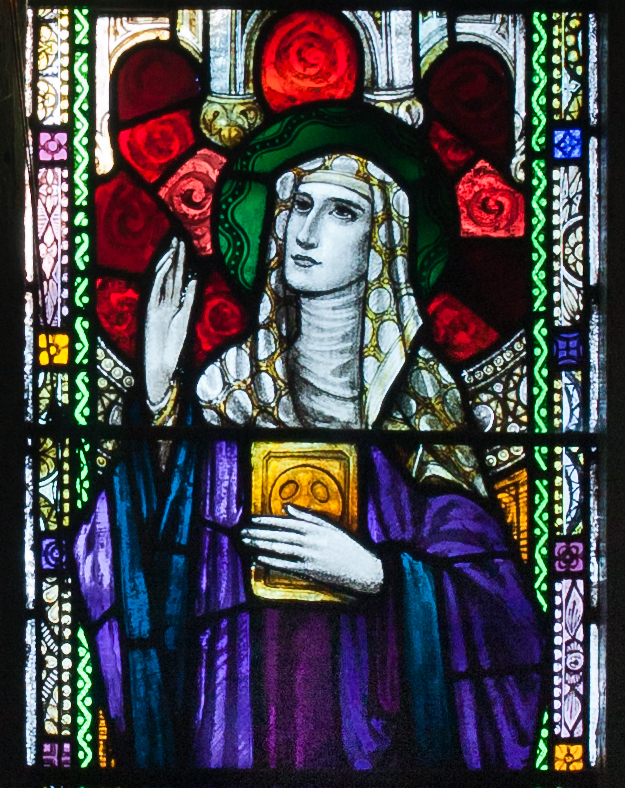
Saint Ita, window in the Church of Our Lady and St. Kieran in Ballylooby, County Tipperary

John Colgan in his Acta Sanctorum Hiberniae (1645) gives an account of the birth of Pulcherius,

His father's name was Beoanus; he was a skilful artificer, and of an honourable family in Connaught; but being compelled to fly into exile, he came into the neighbourhood of St. Ita. She, hearing of his professional skill, and being anxious to make some addition to the buildings of her convent, requested him to undertake the work. He consented, on the conditions of receiving Nesse, the sister of the saint, as his wife, and also some land on which to settle. St. Ita acquiesced in the proposition, and gave him her sister Ness to wife; and he, with great assiduity, applied himself to erect the buildings in the monastery of the saint. It happened, after a time, that in battle, whither he had followed a certain chieftain, Beoanus was killed; and his head, being cut off, was carried away a great distance. St. Ita was, of course, very much grieved at this occurrence, particularly as she had promised her brother in-law that he would have a son, which promise was unfulfilled, as his wife had been sterile up to this time. St. Its went to the field of battle, and found the mutilated body of Beoanus, but, of course, without the head. She, however, prayed that it might be shown to her, and the bead, through the divine power, flew through the air, and stopped where the body lay before her; and the Lord, at the entreaty of his handmaid, made the head adhere to the body as perfectly as if had never been cut off, except that a slight mark of the wound remained; and the space of one hour having passed, he rose alive, saluting the servant of the Lord, and returning thanks to God. After the return of Beoanus, his wife conceived, and she brought forth a son, as St. Its had promised. This son was Pulcherius, and he remained with the saint until he reached his twentieth year.—Colgans Acta Sanctoran, p. 68.

== Butler's account ==
According to the hagiographer Alban Butler in The Lives of the Irish Saints (1823),

Saint Mochoemoc, in Latin, Pulcherius, Abbot. Having been educated under Saint Comgal, in the monastery of Benchor, he laid the foundation of the great monastery of Liath-Mochoemoc, around which a large town was raised, which still bears that name. His happy death is placed by the chronologists on the 13th of March in 655. See Usher's antiquity, in Tab .Chron. and Colgan.

== Monks of Ramsgate account ==
The Monks of Ramsgate wrote in their Book of Saints (1921),

Mochaemhog (Mochcemoc, Vulcanius, Pulcherius) (St.) Abbot. (March 13) (7th cent.) He was born in Munster and brought up by his aunt, Saint Ita. He then became a disciple of Saint Comgall. Later he built cells for his own monks at Anatrim, and finally established himself as head of a community at Liath. Great miracles are recorded of him, especially his having raised the dead to life. The precise year of his death is uncertain.

== Walsh and Conyngham account ==
Thomas Walsh and David Power Conyngham give a more extensive account in their Ecclesiastical History of Ireland (1885).

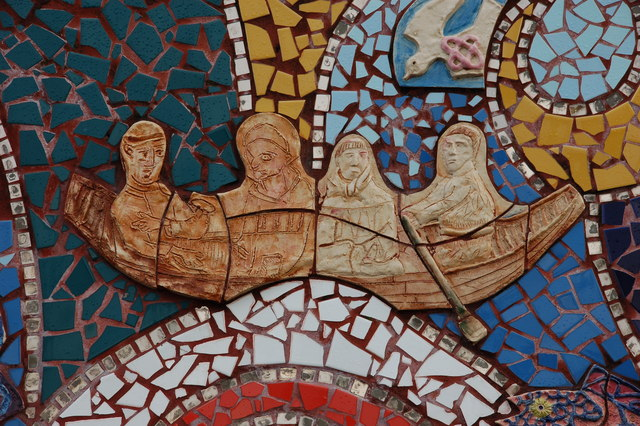
Mosaic from Bangor depicting Saint Comgall and other monks

Leathmore. St. Pulcherius, or Mochoemoc flourished, in the sixth and seventh centuries. He was the son of Bocan, a native of Coumacne, in Connaught, (Conmacne, of Galway,) who, having left his own country, settled in Hy-Conall-Gaura, in the west of the county Limerick, where Pulcherius was born, about the year 550. His mother's name was Nessa, of the Nandesi sept, and through her he was nephew to the celebrated St. Ita, called the Brigid of Munster, with whom he remained twenty years. Being well prepared for the ecclesiastical and monastic state, he went, with her consent and approbation to place himself under the guidance of St. Comgall, of Bangor. Qualified to preside over others, the holy abbot of Bangor advised him to found a religious establishment for himself, wherever the Almighty would direct.

Having, in compliance with the instructions of Comgall, repaired from the austere retreat of Bangor to his own country, and having been introduced to the chieftain of Ely O'Carrol, who received him with attention, and generously offered his own residence, for the purpose of converting it into a monastery; he declined the offer of the prince, but Pulcherius accepted the grant of a lonesome spot in a thick forest, to which he gave the name of Leathemore. Here he spent some years shut out from the intercourse of the world, training up a numerous body of disciples in the duties and observances of a spiritual life. The prince, who was his benefactor, having died, Ronan, his successor, intended to expel the saint from his territory, and went with this resolve towards the monastery, having in his train a party of soldiers to execute his mischievous design. When he arrived near the monastery, Pulehecherins was celebrating the divine mysteries. Ronan, suddenly struck by the vengeance of heaven, could not stir from the spot on which he stood. Repenting his rashness, the prince sent word to Pulcherius, requesting that ho would come and relieve him from his situation. The message was not conveyed to Pulcherius until he had finished not only the sacrifice, but likewise Tierce, a part of the divine office. Pulcherius replied, that he would not go out of the monastery until after finishing another part of the office, called None; having done so, he visited Ronan, and having imparted his benediction, relieved the prince from the awkward position which his own temerity had procured.

Thenceforth a great friendship existed between them; and after Ronan's death, the saint fervently supplicated the father of mercy for the repose of his soul. At a later period, Failbhe Fiend, king of all Munster, being displeased with Pulcherius for preventing some horses of his to graze in the field belonging to his monastery, ordered the chieftain to expel him from that country. Pulcherius having proceeded to Cashel, remonstrated with the king on the injustice of his order; but the king, who received him in a very insulting manner, was immediately seized with violent pains in one of his eyes, and was deprived of its use. The courtiers having entreated St. Pulcherius to procure him some relief, he blessed water, which, on being applied to the eye, the pain ceased—the blindness still continuing. On the following night the king had a vision during his sleep, in which he thought he saw from his castle on the rock, the plains, north and south of the city, covered with all the saints of Ireland, and was told by a venerable-looking person that they had assembled in defence of Pulcherius, and that he and his posterity would be destroyed in case of not complying with the request of Pulcherius. Accordingly, the king on the next day sent for him, and granted what the saint required : henceforth Pulcherius was hold by the king in great veneration.

Several miracles are attributed to Pulcherius, among others, his having cured of blindness a holy virgin Canners, daughter of Fintan, who is considered to have been the relative of St. Molua, of Clonfert Molua. The celebrated Dagan was, in his younger days, a disciple of St. Pulcherius, as was also Cuanchear, of whose history little is known. Besides St Cainnech, Colman of Doire-more, Pulcheritts was intimate with St Molua of Clonfert-molua, St. Lacteau, of Achad-ur, a St. Finbhar, and St. Luchern, who had been his fellow-students at Bangor.

Through the sanctity and labors of Pulcherius, a desolate and uninhabited forest became the abode of saints and scholars. Our saint died, having lived to a great age, on the 13th of March, A.D. 656.

== Sources ==
- Butler, Alban (1823), The Lives of the Irish Saints, Extracted from the Writings of the Rev. Alban Butler, and Now Placed in Order, with a Prefixed Callender; to which is Added, an Office and Litany in Their Honour, with a Defence of the Monastic Institute. By a Cistercian Monk, J. Coyne This article incorporates text from this source, which is in the public domain.
- Casteleyn, Mary; Kirwan, Bernie (24 August 2019), Tifeaghna Co Kilkenny in the Barony of Galmoy, the Parish of Sheffin and the Poor Law Union of Urlingford
- Colgan, John (1849), "O Ita !", in Stephen J. Meany (ed.), Shells from the Shannon, ballads, poems & lyrics, orig. & transl This article incorporates text from this source, which is in the public domain.
- Mackay, William (1893), Urquhart and Glenmoriston: Olden Times in a Highland Parish, Northern Counties Newspaper and Printing and Publishing Company, Limited This article incorporates text from this source, which is in the public domain.
- "Mochoemoc", The Oxford Dictionary of Saints – via Oxford Reference
- St. Augustine's Abbey, Ramsgate (1921). The Book of saints : a dictionary of servants of God canonized by the Catholic Church. London: A. & C. Black, ltd. OCLC 671676136. This article incorporates text from this source, which is in the public domain.
- O'Hanlon, John (1873), Lives of the Irish saints
- "Saint Mochoemoc", CatholicSaints
- Shearman, Rev. J. F. (1879), "Loca Patriciana Part IX St. Patrick's Progress into Ossory etc.", The Journal of the Royal Historical and Archaeological Association of Ireland
- "St Quivox", GenUKI
- Stephen, Leslie; Lee, Sir Sidney (1894), Dictionary of National Biography, Smith, Elder, & Company
- Walsh, Thomas; Conyngham, David Power (1885), Ecclesiastical History of Ireland, Kenedy
- Woulfe, Rev Patrick (1923), Irish Names and Surnames This article incorporates text from this source, which is in the public domain.
