= Rathmanna, Rahelty =

Townland in County Tipperary, Ireland

Rathmanna is a townland containing just over 45 acres in Rahelty civil parish in County Tipperary. It should not be confused with the much larger townland of the same name just across the border in Borrisleigh civil parish.

At the time of the 1891 census, it had a population of 5; in the 1901 census, this had grown to 8 and by the 1911 census had grown again to 12.
