= Liathmore Sheela-na-gig =

Sculpture

Liathmore sheela-na-gig
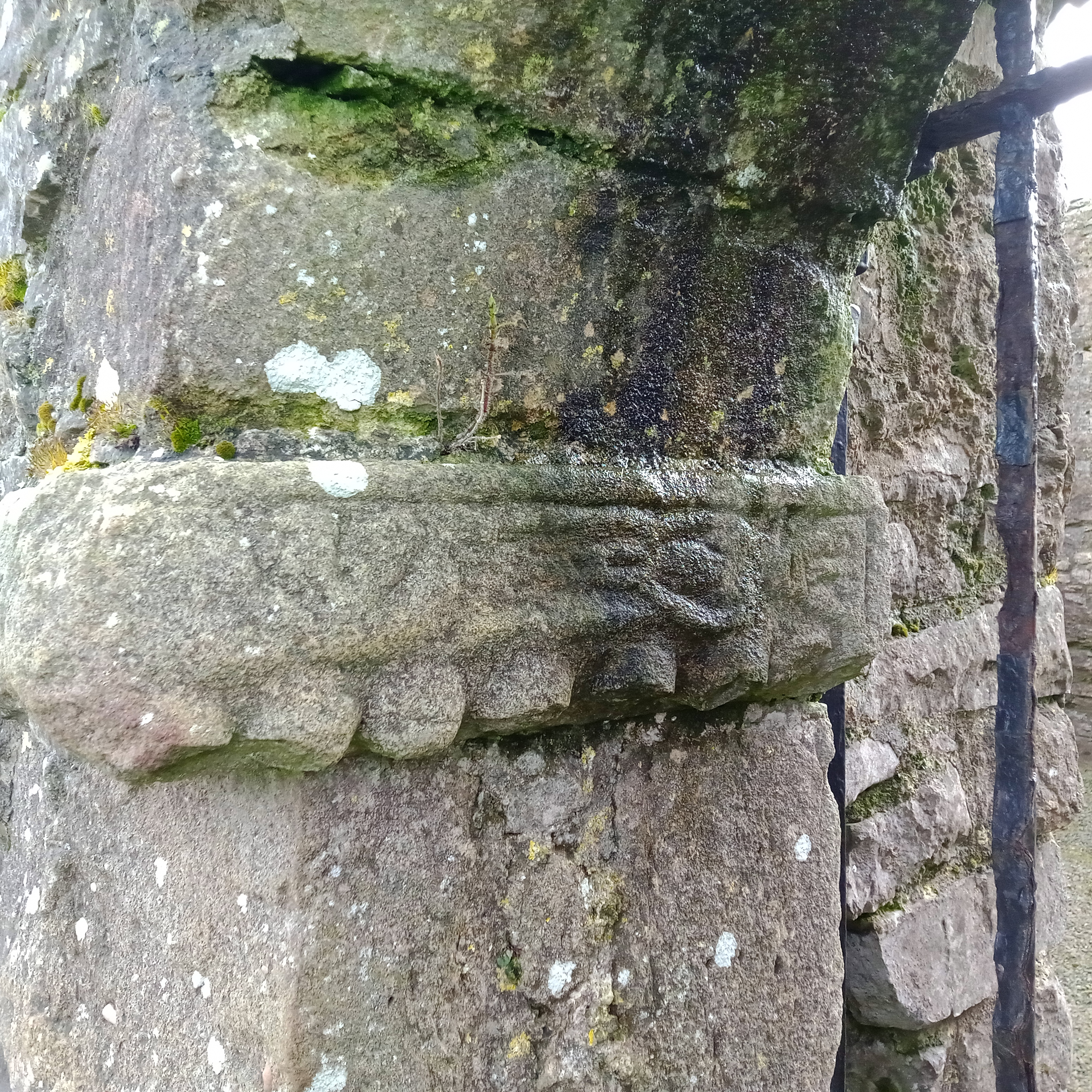
- Sheela-na-gig at Liathmore church
- Artist: Unknown
- Year: Unknown
- Catalogue: Guest 61, Freitag 62, Andersen 91, McMahon/Roberts 67
- Medium: Sandstone
- Subject: Sheela-na-gig
- Dimensions: 10 cm × 45 cm (3.9 in × 18 in)
- Weight: Unknown
- Location: Leigh, County Tipperary

The Liathmore Sheela-na-gig is a carving on the northern doorway at the larger church ruin at Liathmore monastic site in the townland of Leigh, County Tipperary in Ireland. The Sites and Monuments Record number for the sheela na gig carving is TN042-055004.

The former monastic site is on private land, but signposted from the old Dublin-Cork road (as "Liathmore Two Churches").

== Description ==
Barbara Freitag dates the small sheela-na-gig to the 12th century, while the church she is part of is dated to the 15th. The Sheela-na-gig is lying on her left side with her triangular head with large eyes towards the inside of the church and the feet towards the former round tower (now only the foundations remain). Both arms are in front of the body with the hands touching the vulva on both sides which is indicated by a slit. Both legs are straight.

The figure in low relief on sandstone used to have a floral decoration at her feet which are now defaced; similar carvings survive in the church.

== Gallery ==
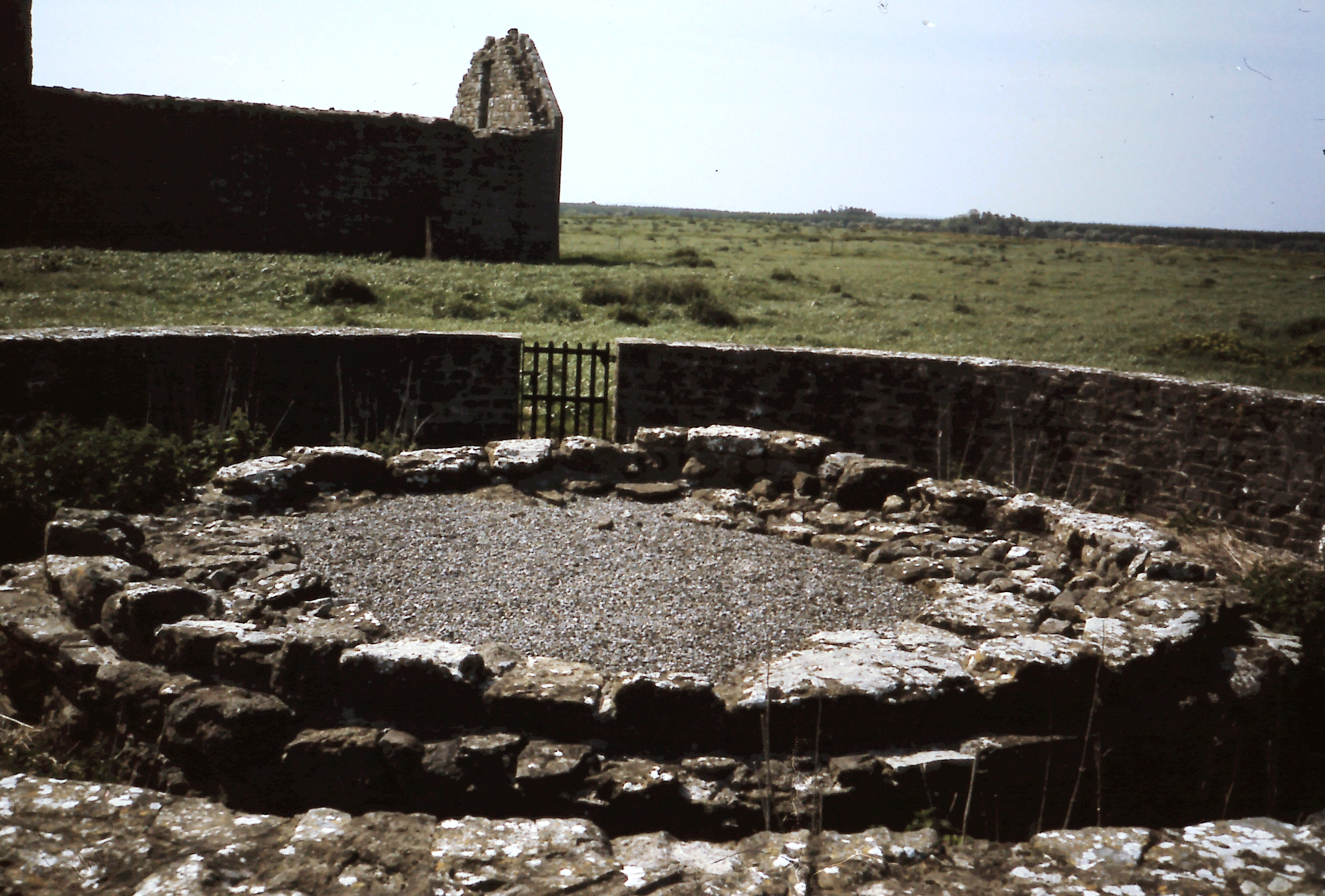
View from the foundations of the round tower towards the church

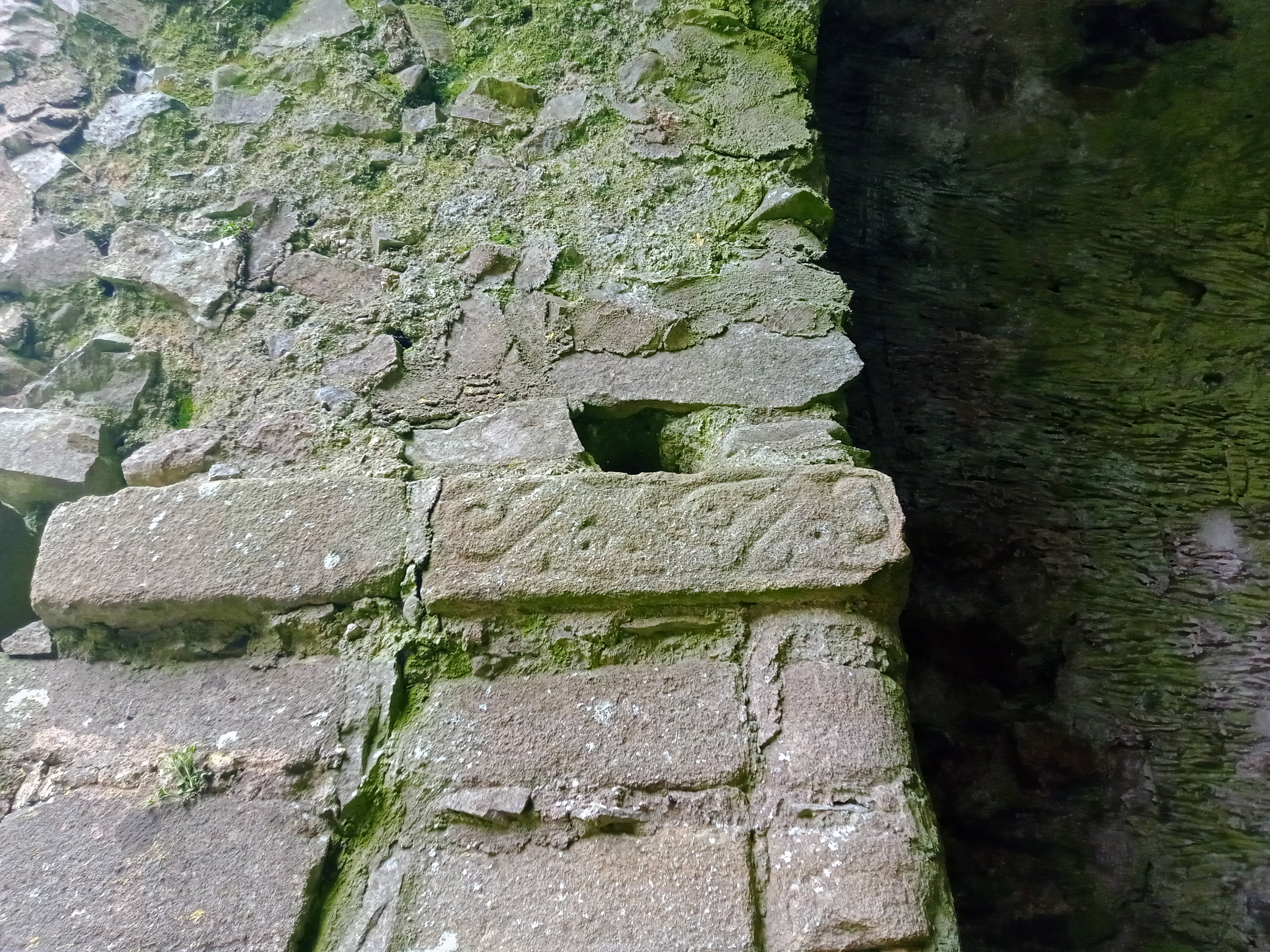
Carved stone detail inside the church similar in shape and size to the sheela-na-gig

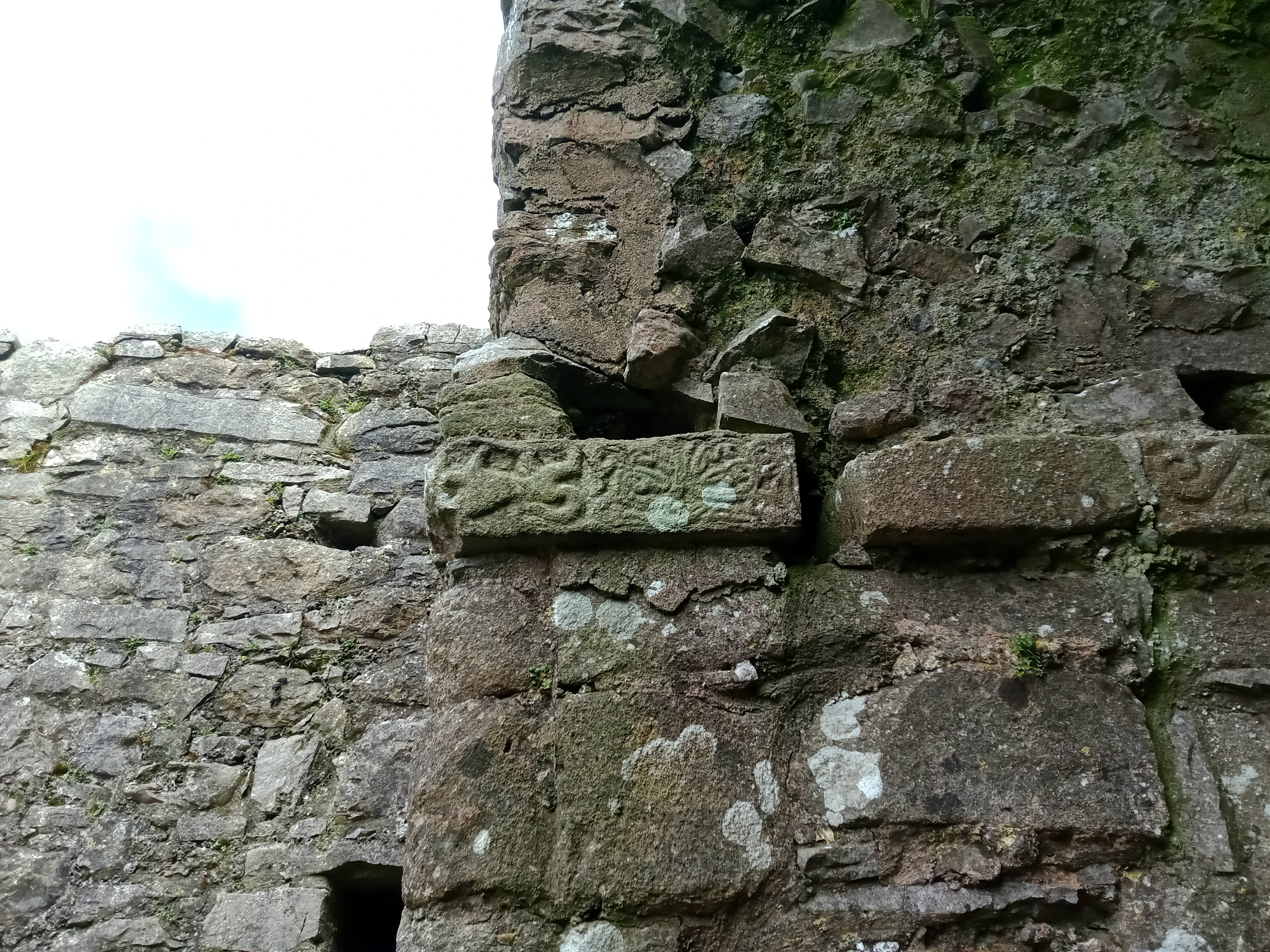
Liathmore figurative relief inside the church, also similar to the sheela-na-gig

== See also ==
- Coolaghmore Sheela-na-gig
- Fethard Abbey Sheela-na-gig
- Kiltinan Church Sheela-na-gig
