= Liathmore Churches =

- Teampaill an Liath Mór
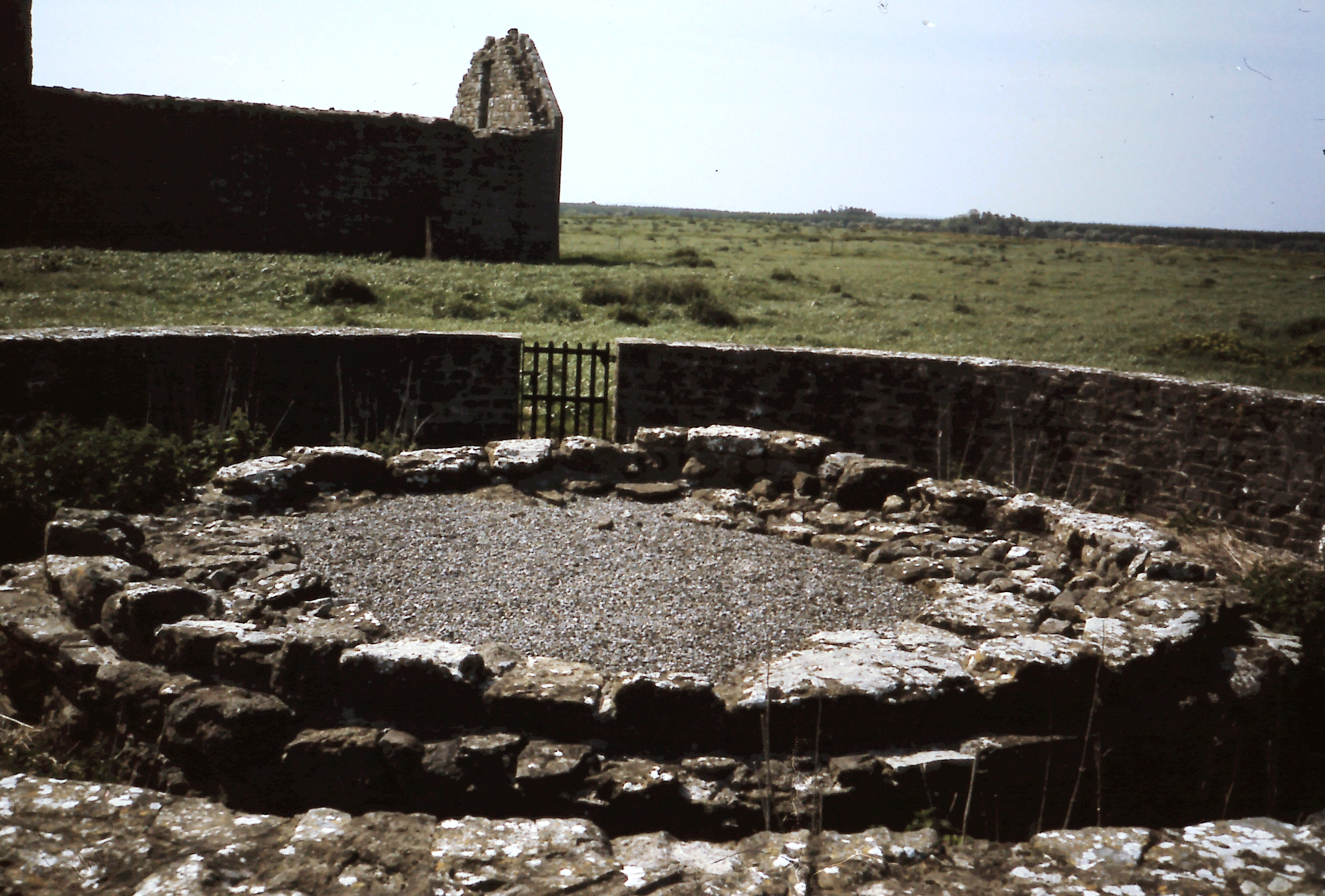
- Foundations of a round tower

- Location within Ireland
- 52.67055°N 7.66861°W
- Location: Liath, Two-Mile Borris, County Tipperary
- Country: Ireland
- Denomination: Church of Ireland
- Previous denomination: Catholic

History
- Founded: 12th century

Architecture
- Functional status: inactive

Specifications
- Materials: stone

Administration
- Diocese: Cashel and Emly
Designations
National monument of Ireland
- Official name: Liathmore Two Churches
- Reference no.: 266

Liathmore Churches are two medieval churches forming a National Monument in County Tipperary, Ireland.

== Location ==
The Liathmore site, also known as 'Liathmore-Mochoemóg', is located in the townland of Leigh (Liath) approximately 2.8 kilometres (1.7 mi) east of the village of Two-Mile Borris.

== History ==
St Mochoemog (d. 655) founded the monastery here. There are two churches and the footings of a round tower.

The smaller church is the earlier and dates to the early medieval period; the larger church is late medieval and was begun in the 12th century, and contains a number of tombs.

== Building ==
A sheela-na-gig carving, known as the Liathmore Sheela-na-gig, is located on the left hand side of a Romanesque doorway belonging to the larger of the two churches.

The larger church: nave is 41'4" x 18'8" (12.6 x 5.7 m), and the chancel 26'9" x 16'2" (8.2 x 4.9 m). It was originally a single-chamber church with antae at the east end.

The circular foundation proved to be the base of an Irish round tower. As there is no historical record or oral tradition of a tower here it is thought that it must have fallen, and its stones removed, sometime before 1500. The diameter was 15 ft. 6in. (4.7 m).

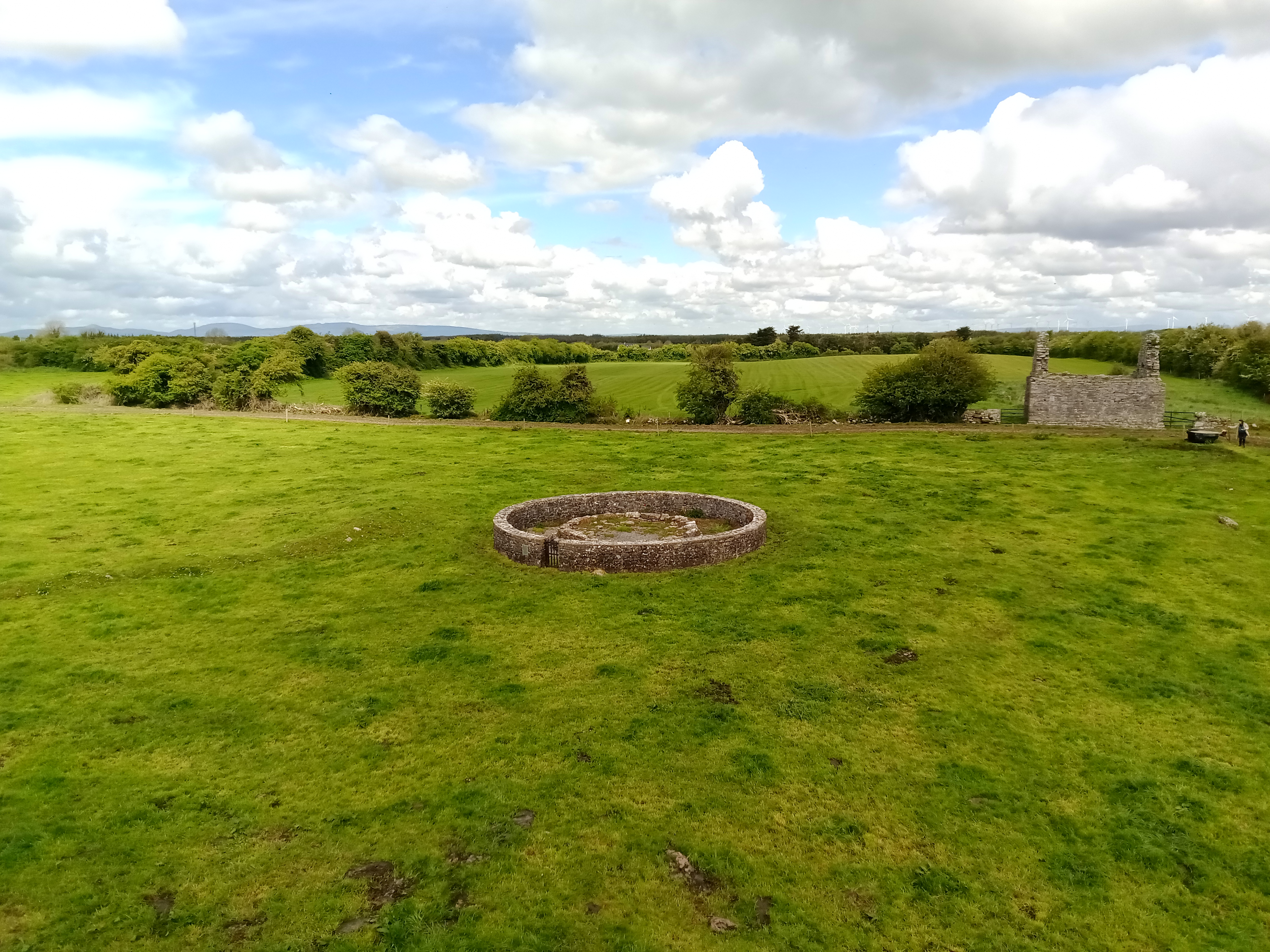
Liathmore round tower from above

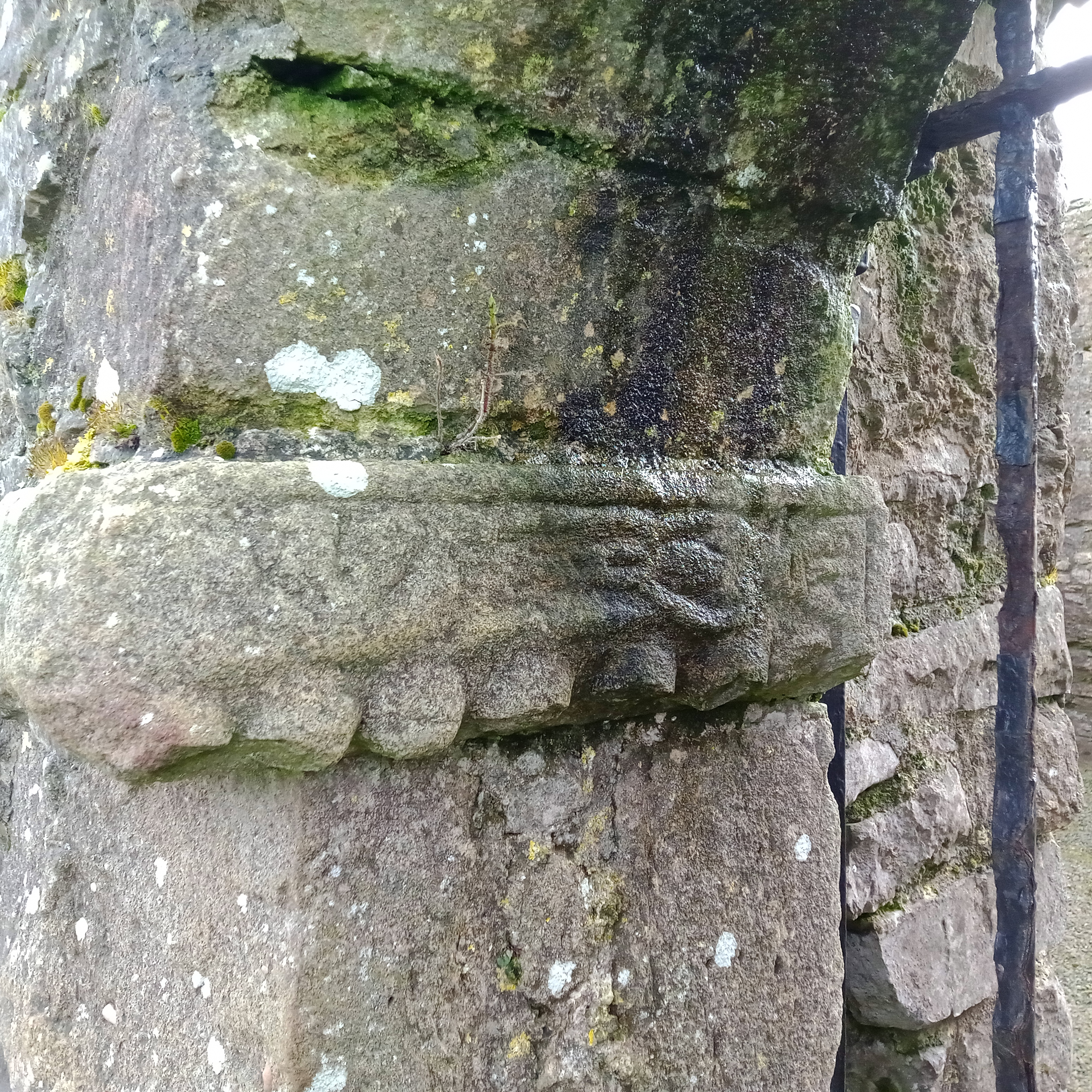
Liathmore sheela na gig
