= Kiltinan Church Sheela-na-gig =

Sheela-na-gig in County Tipperary, Ireland

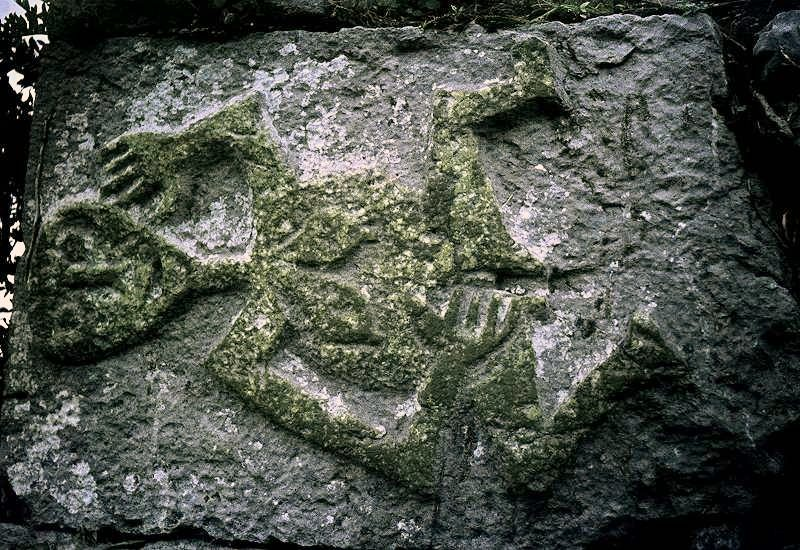
- Kiltinan Church sheela-na-gig in 1975
- Artist: Unknown
- Year: Unknown
- Catalogue: Guest 59, Andersen 89, McMahon/Roberts 63, Freitag 59
- Subject: sheela-na-gig
- Dimensions: 51 cm × 81 cm (20 in × 32 in)
- Location: Unknown
- Owner: Unknown (stolen)

The Kiltinan Church sheela-na-gig is a carved depiction of a nude woman exposing her vulva which used to be part of Kiltinan Church ruin near Fethard, County Tipperary as a quoin stone in the Southwestern corner of the church. However, it was stolen in 1990 and has not been located since. Fethard Historical Society issued a Wanted poster to help with the retrieval. The National Sites and Monuments no. is TS070-101003.

== Descriptions ==
The sheela-na-gig was first described by Celticist and Surveyor John O'Donovan on 18 October 1840 in one of his Ordnance Survey letters:

"The figure spoken of by Mr. Clibborn is sculpted in a very rude style on a corner stone of in the west gable of the old church of Kiltinan near Feathard (!) which church is not five centuries old, and indeed it was very bad taste to exhibit such a figure on a christian chapel of so late a period! Tradition says that it was set up to annoy descendants of Sheela who was such a character here as Graine Mail (O'Mailey) was in Connaught."

It is in the same letter, on the previous page, talking about a sheela-na-gig at Cashel, he uses the expression "Sheela Ny Gigg". Note his use of the word "ní" instead of the now used "na" which would possibly denote a family relation ("Sheila, daughter of Gigg").

The sheela-na-gig stolen from Kiltinan Church has an earless triangular head (like the Liathmore Sheela-na-gig) with large eyes and an open smile on her face. Her left hand is touching the side of her head. She has pear shaped or droopy breasts with one having two nipples. Her right hand is holding her vulva open. Both knees are bent, which has led some scholars to suggest that she is dancing a jig. Depending on whether she was originally upright or has always been lying on her side, she might also be pleasuring herself. Whatever the case, having the legs spread like that would anatomically support the exposure of the vulva. Both feet seem to be facing outward. The left leg is raised higher than the right.

== Theft ==
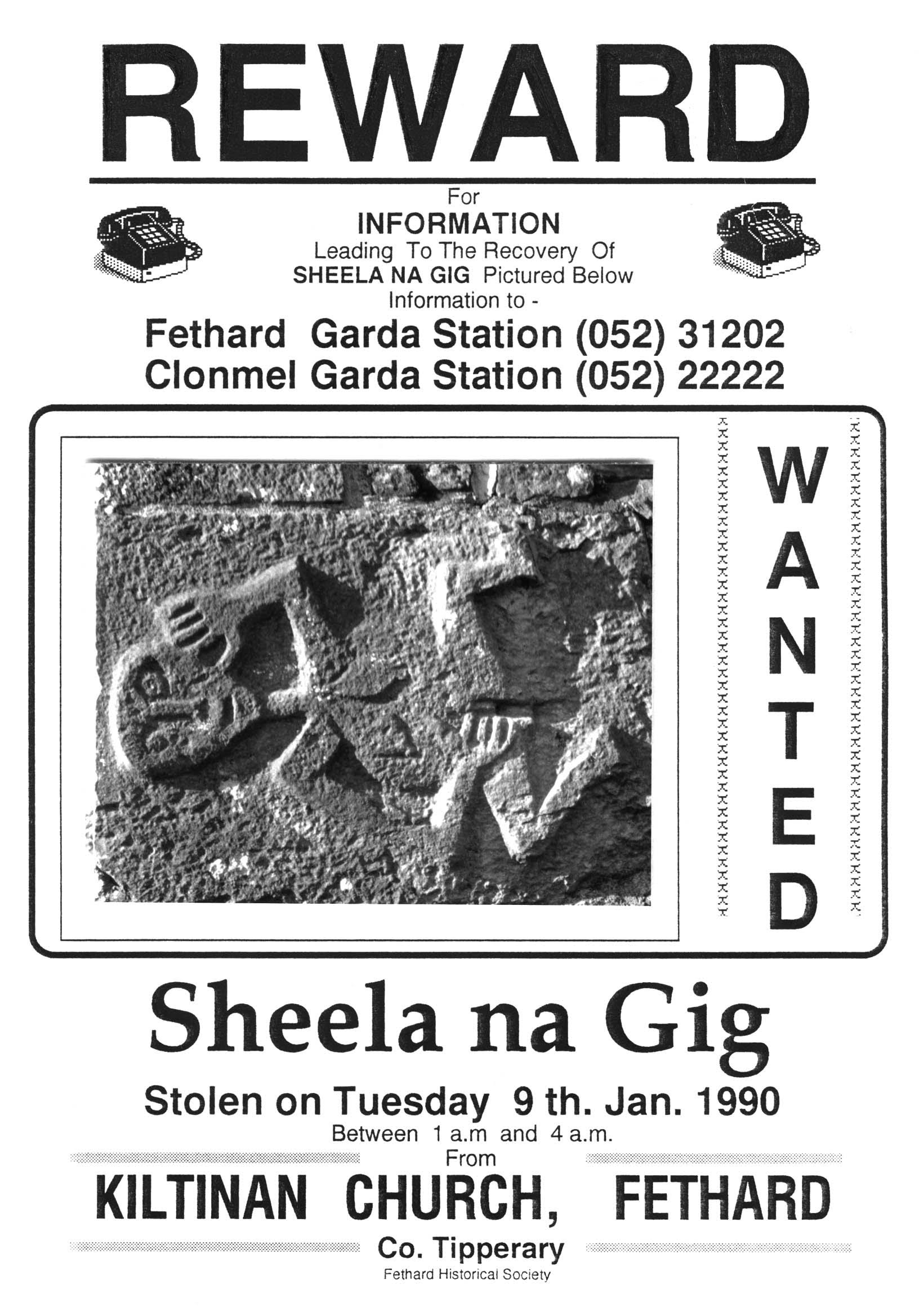
Wanted poster for the recovery of the Kiltinan Church sheela-na-gig

The theft of the Kiltinan sheela-na-gig, in the early morning hours of 9 January 1990, was discovered by Joe Clarke. Fethard Historical Society in co-operation with photographer Joe Kenny created a Wanted poster, which has unfortunately not led to the recovery of the stone carving as of March 2022. At the time of the theft, the press estimated its worth at £3 million. One of the (since cleared) persons of interest was Jim O'Connor who was a member of Fethard Historical Society and who had grown up in the area of Kiltinan Church. He made a replica of the stolen sheela-na-gig from photographs to replace the stolen one at the church. However, this was never concluded, so the replica is now kept on private land on the Beara Peninsula.

== See also ==
- Coolaghmore Sheela-na-gig
- Fethard Abbey Sheela-na-gig
- Liathmore Sheela-na-gig
