= Fethard Abbey Sheela-na-gig =

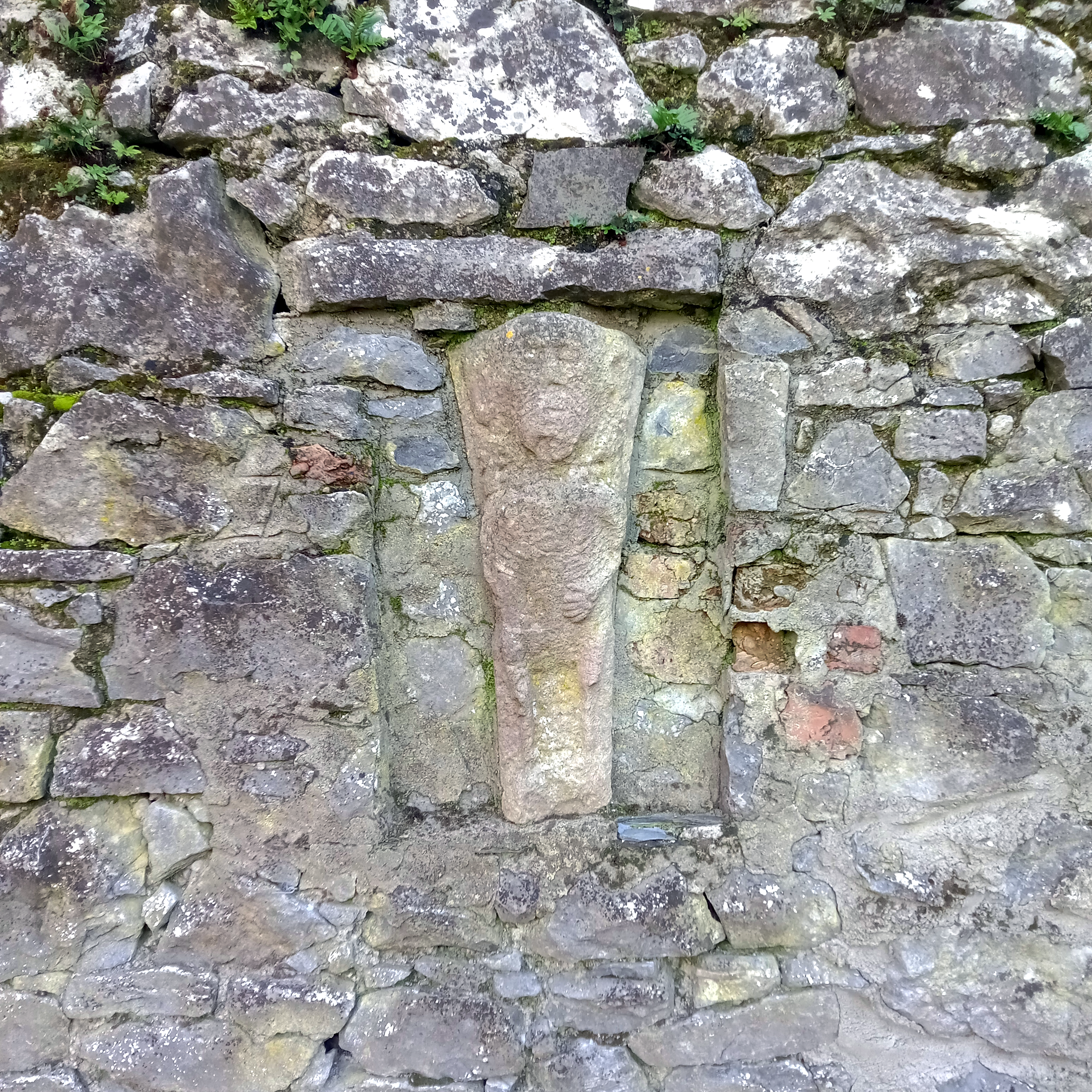
- Sheela-na-gig at Augustinian Abbey in Fethard
- Artist: Unknown
- Year: Unknown
- Catalogue: Guest 13, Andersen 81, McMahon/ Roberts 50, Freitag 46
- Dimensions: 50 cm × 20 cm (20 in × 7.9 in)
- Location: Fethard

The Fethard Abbey Sheela-na-gig is located in a wall on the grounds of the former Augustinian Abbey in Fethard. Its National Sites and Monuments number is TS070-040030. One of its earliest mentions is in the School Collection which also includes a black and white photograph.

== Description ==
The figure is not in its original location. The figure is in an upright orientation and carved in high relief with a disproportionately large head with what Barbara Freitag describes as "jug ears", but a comparison with a monkey would not be too far off either. There are lines in the forehead and cheeks, maybe to indicate old age or emaciation. The ribs are clearly defined, and breasts are not indicated. The lower body has been defaced, so that the vulva and the right hand touching it are no longer visible. The fingers on the left hand are fanned out, similar to the lost Kiltinan example. The legs are straight and spindly with the feet missing.

== See also ==
- Coolaghmore Sheela-na-gig
- Kiltinan Church Sheela-na-gig
- Liathmore Sheela-na-gig
