= Thurles Poor Law Union =

Former administrative unit in Ireland

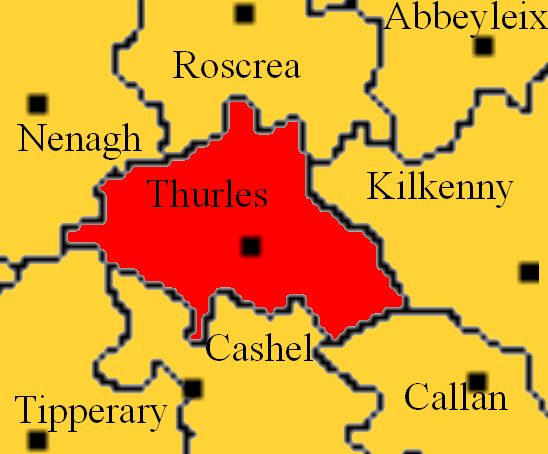
Outline map of the union, showing neighbouring unions

Thurles Poor Law Union, was an Irish Poor Law union declared on 28 March 1839. It covered an area of 195 square miles (510 km^{2}), mostly in North Tipperary but also including some of South Tipperary. Although the boundaries of some poor law unions changed during the course of the 19th century, the Thurles union seems to have retained its original boundaries.

There were 41 members of its board of guardians (which met on Tuesday each week), of which 10 were ex officio and 31 were elected to represent the 21 electoral divisions in the union. These divisions, each, unless otherwise specified below, electing one member of the board, were as follows:

- Ballycahill
- Ballymoreen
- Buolick (or Boolick or Baolick) – electing 2 guardians
- Burris (Borrisleigh or Twomileborris)
- Burrisoleigh (or Borrisoleigh) – electing 3 guardians
- Drom
- Fermor
- Holycross
- Inch
- Kilcooly
- East Loughmore
- West Loughmore
- Moyaliffe (or Mealiffe) – electing 2 guardians
- Moycarkey
- Moyne
- Rahealty
- Templebeg
- Templeree
- Templemore – electing 3 guardians
- Templetoohy
- Thurles – electing 5 guardians

At the time of the 1831 census, the population of the area that later made up the union was 64,235, the divisional populations ranging from 1,237 in Ballymoreen district to 10,459 in Thurles district.

A workhouse for the union was built in 1841–1842, at a cost of £5,840 plus £1,260 for fittings, on a 6.5-acre (2.6 ha) site to the north-west of Thurles town, in the townland of Gortataggart. It was designed by George Wilkinson, the Poor Law Commissioners' architect, and was based on one of his standard plans, with the intention that it accommodate 700 people. It was declared fit for use on 25 April 1842 and the first inmates were admitted on 7 November that year.

The Poor Law Commissioners had the power to dissolve any Board of Guardians that was "failing to provide sufficient funds, or to apply them efficiently in relieving the destitute" and to install their own officers. A total of 32 boards in Ireland were dissolved in 1847. In 1849, six more boards were dissolved, including those for three contiguous poor law union in County Tipperary: Thurles, Cashel and Tipperary. On 29 June 1849, Henry William Massy, former chairman of the Board of Guardians for Tipperary Poor Law Union told the Select Committee on Poor Laws (Ireland) at Westminster that the "sealed orders for the dissolution of the Board of Guardians came down on the 9th of January 1849", so it is possible that the Thurles board was dissolved at the same time.
