= Rahelty (electoral division) =

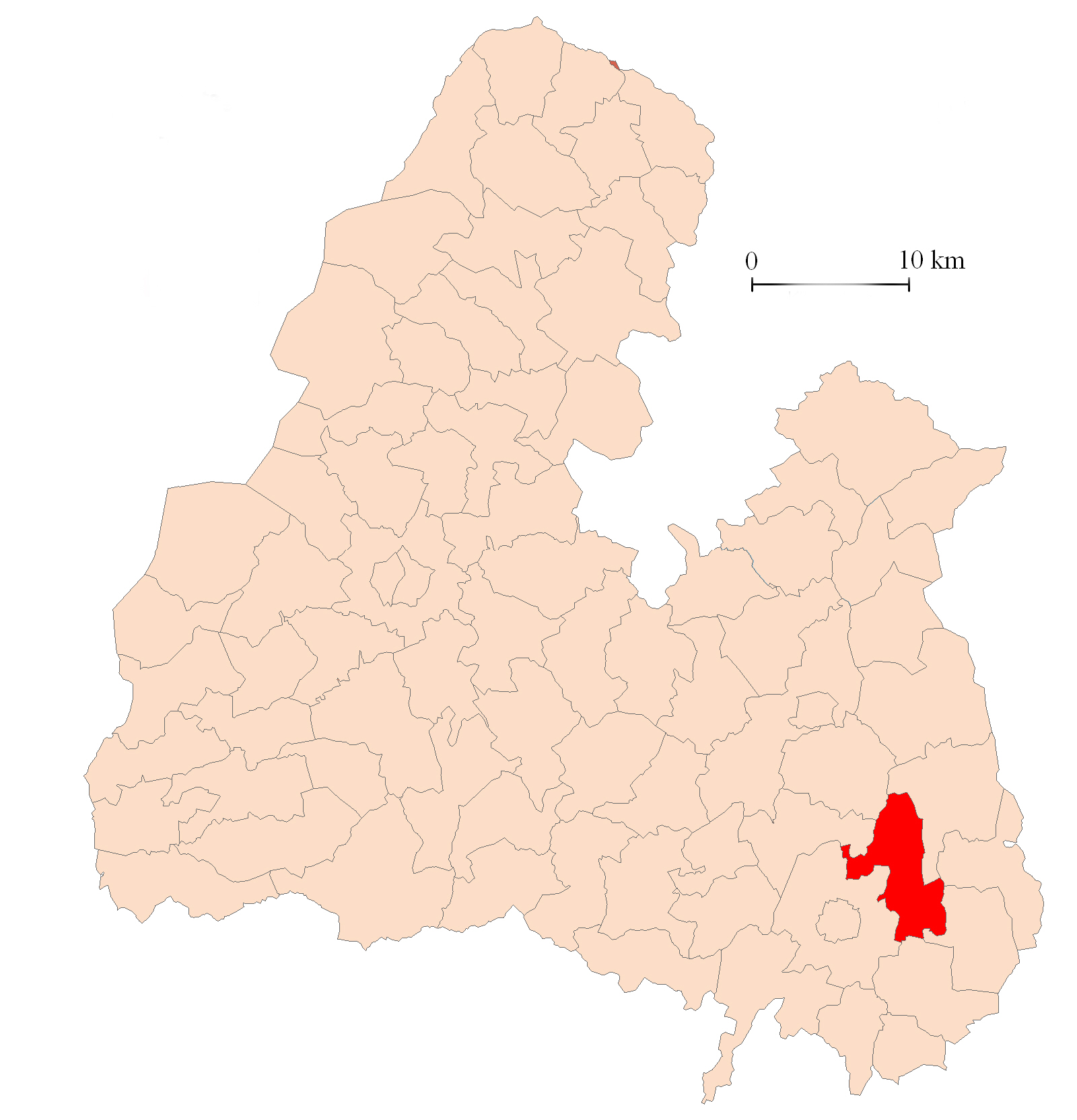
Outline map of North Tipperary showing boundary of Rahelty electoral division in 2011

Rahealty, or Rahelty, is an electoral division in County Tipperary in Ireland.

It was originally created as an electoral division in the Thurles poor law union in North Tipperary. Although the poor law unions have long been abolished, this electoral division, although with boundaries that have been modified over the years, is still used for various administrative purposes.

== Ratepayers, Tenants and Landlords ==
In 1842, the landlords in this electoral district included the Earl of Orkney, Earl of Milton and Lady Lovett.

== Relationship to the civil parish ==
At the time of the 1911 and 2011 censuses, the electoral division contained nineteen townlands. Among these were ten townlands of the eighteen that belong to the civil parish of the same name

- Athlummon
- Coolaculla
- Garranroe
- Knockanacunna
- Lisduff
- Loughbeg
- Piercetown
- Rahelty
- Rathcriddoge
- Rathmanna

as well as townlands from five other civil parishes, these being

- Athnid Beg (from Athnid parish)
- Athnid More (from Athnid parish)
- Kilclonagh (from Kilclonagh parish)
- Rossestown (from Shyane parish)
- Ballygammane (from Thurles parish)
- Loughlahan (from Thurles parish)
- Coldfields (from Two-mile Burris parish)
- Garraun (from Two-mile Burris parish)
- Rathmanna (from Two-mile Burris parish)

In both censuses, the following townlands which belong to Rahelty civil parish were not included in Rahelty electoral division:

- Archerstown
- Cassestown
- Corbally
- Drish
- Knockroe
- Kyle
- Shanballyduff
- Townagha

== Statistics ==
At the time of the 2011 census, the division had a population of 765, of whom 386 were male and 379 were female. The total housing stock was 273, of which 20 dwellings were vacant.
