= Tipperary Venue =

Proposed development in Ireland

The Tipperary Venue was a proposed super casino development on a projected 325 hectares (800 acres) site adjacent to the M8 motorway at Two-Mile Borris, County Tipperary in Ireland. As originally planned, the project proposed the building of an all-weather racecourse and greyhound tracks, equestrian centre, 500 room hotel, eighteen hole golf course, 15,000 capacity "underground entertainment" venue, heliport, a replica of the White House and a "Las Vegas Strip-style" casino.

While, as of 2015, the project's developers were reportedly "continuing to purchase land and properties in order to develop a casino", as of 2017 it was reported that Ireland's gambling legislation did not support the proposed development. The planning permission for the proposed project expired in 2018.

== Proposed development ==
The development, which was projected (as of 2009) to cost €460m and subsequently granted planning permission by North Tipperary County Council, was originally proposed to include a 500 room "five star" hotel, a large casino, and a replica of the White House. The venue's proposed racecourse was planned to include a national hunt track, a 7-furlong sprint track and an all-weather flood-lit track. This would be combined with a greyhound track, a dual stadium incorporating a capacity for 7,000 patrons and a 15,000-seater underground entertainment venue with a retractable roof. There were further plans for an 18-hole golf course, driving range, retail outlets, equestrian centre, timber chapel, and a heliport. The facility's initial plan included approximately 6,000 car spaces.

The project's initial instigator and primary backer was "slot-machine tycoon" Richard Quirke. Other initial supporters of the project reportedly included local independent TD Michael Lowry (described by the Irish Examiner as "closely associated with the project"), racehorse trainer Aidan O'Brien, and concert promoter Denis Desmond. Thurles racecourse, owned by the Molony family, reputedly "agreed to close" upon completion of the proposed project. It was suggested that 1,000 people could be employed during the three years of planned construction.

== Status ==
In June 2011, planning permission was given by An Bord Pleanála for the proposed venue. However, the planning board refused permission for the 15,000-seater "underground" music venue as it was deemed inappropriate considering the rural location. The proposed project reportedly "ran into trouble almost immediately" and was opposed by the conservation body An Taisce and a number of local residents.

The project was also dependent on the Oireachtas agreeing to pass new gaming legislation to actually allow the casino to open. In September 2011, then Minister for Justice Alan Shatter said the casino was "[ruled] out" based on a cabinet decision. Taoiseach Enda Kenny also ruled out any large-scale gaming venues, stating that the government was concerned about the protection of the young and vulnerable. Legislation was then proposed by the Minister of Justice to provide improved regulation of smaller casinos, and the government also agreed to start work on drawing up further laws.

Following submissions by Quirke in 2013, the Irish Independent reported that there was "no sign of the Government altering its ban on supercasinos". As of January 2017, the proposed legislation made "provision for the licensing of modest-sized casinos" only. While the original planning application expired in 2018, the developer applied for (and was granted) an extension until March 2023.
