= Coolaghmore Sheela-na-gig =

Sheela na gig sculpture in Kilkenny, Ireland

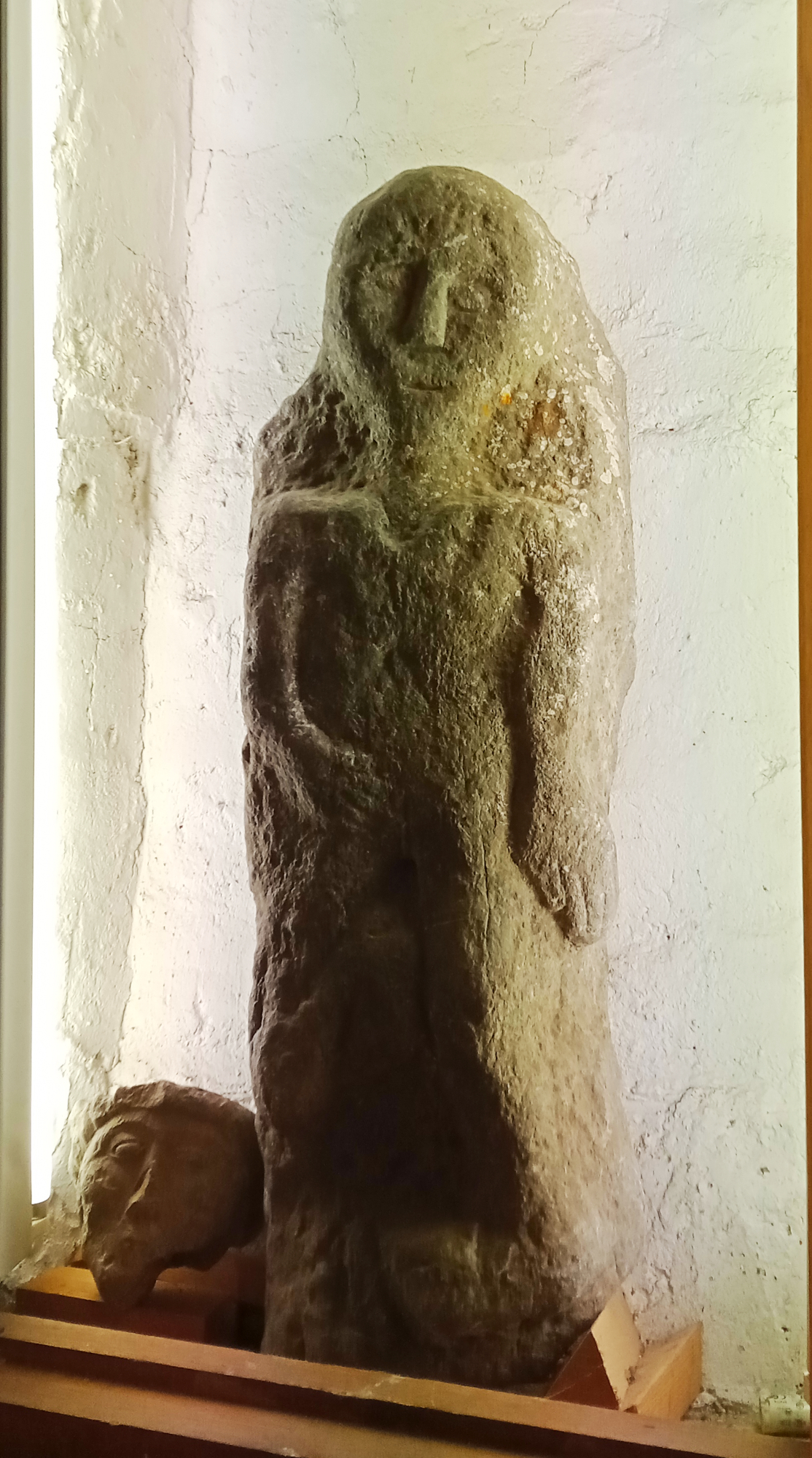
- Sheela-na-gig at Rothe House
- Year: unknown
- Completion date: unknown
- Catalogue: Freitag 37, McMahon/Roberts 40
- Medium: limestone
- Subject: sheela-na-gig
- Dimensions: 78 cm (31 in)
- Location: Rothe House Museum & Garden, Kilkenny; 52.6543565°N 7.2547221°W
- Owner: Rothe House Museum

The Coolaghmore sheela na gig was discovered in 1975 at the 13th century church at Coolaghmore (also Cooliaghmore or Cooliagh More), County Kilkenny, Ireland during clearance work at the graveyard. It is thought to have been buried in the 19th century. According to local sources, it had been found in a well in Kyle previously and been brought to Coolaghmore Graveyard. It was then donated to Rothe House Museum via Kilkenny Archaeological Society where it is on display in a bricked up window in the shop of the first of the three houses since about 2012. The sites and monuments records number (at Rothe House) is KK019-026170.

== Description ==
The sheela na gig is on display in an upright position, but since it has been moved from its original location, this might not have been the original orientation. The sheela's head is pear-shaped and earless (other examples have very large ears) with a calm expression on her face. She has a thin neck with the collar bones protruding, in accordance with the often emaciated depiction of the upper body. The ribs are slightly incised. While her left arm is hanging/ lying by her side, her right hand is touching the vulva which has a deep hole below. Other than that, the vulva is not exaggerated like many other examples. Barbara Freitag believes that the larger left hand might be holding an object. The right leg is bent with the foot touching the upper inner thigh of the left leg and the heel pointing towards the vulva with the left foot turned inwards.

== 3D model ==
In 2018, Gary Dempsey created a photogrammetry model of the sheela-na-gig in Rothe House which is accessible on Sketchfab.

== Gallery ==
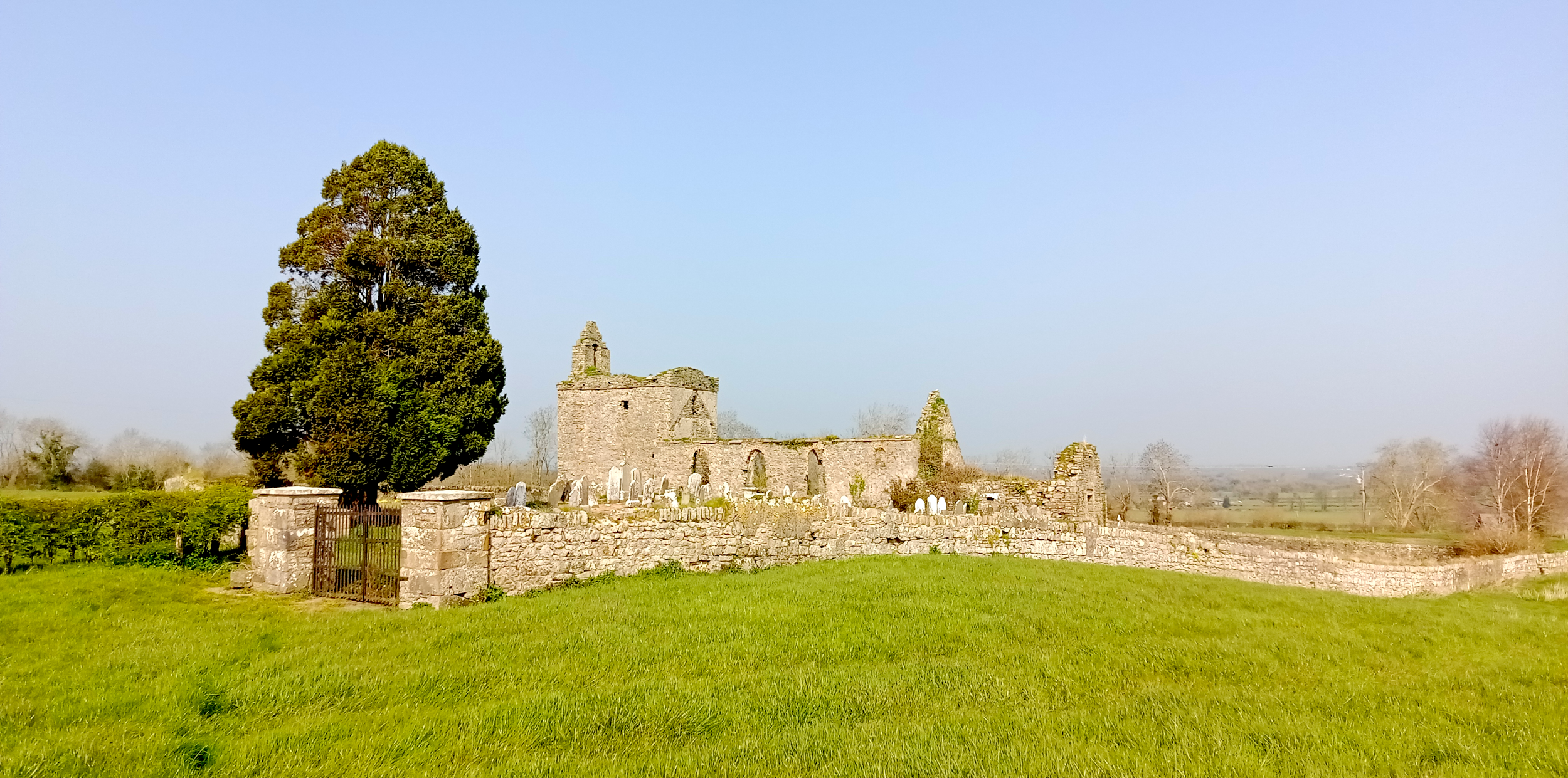
View unto Coolaghmore Graveyard and church ruins where the sheela-na-gig was discovered

== See also ==
- Fethard Abbey Sheela-na-gig
- Liathmore Sheela-na-gig
- Kiltinan Church Sheela-na-gig
