= Rathmanna, Borrisleigh =

Townland in County Tipperary, Ireland

Rathmanna is a townland containing just over 240 acres in Borrisleigh civil parish in County Tipperary. It should not be confused with the much smaller townland of the same name just across the border in Rahelty civil parish.

At the time of the 1891 census, it had a population of 20; in the 1901 census, this had dropped to 14 but by the 1911 census it had grown marginally to 15.
