= Noard =

Townland (administrative division) in Ireland

Coordinates: 52.6595°N 7.6849°W

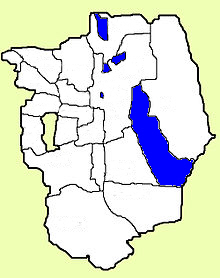
Noard and its four exclaves

Noard is a townland in the civil parish of Twomileborris, County Tipperary. In addition to its main body, the townland has four exclaves, located in other townlands within the parish.

At the time of the 1911 census, there were 13 households in the townland.
