= Rahelty (townland) =

Townland in County Tipperary, Ireland

Rahelty, sometimes written Rahealty, is a townland in the civil parish of the same name in County Tipperary, Ireland.
