= Leigh, County Tipperary =

Townland in Twomileborris, County Tipperary, Ireland

Coordinates: 52.67°N 7.67°W

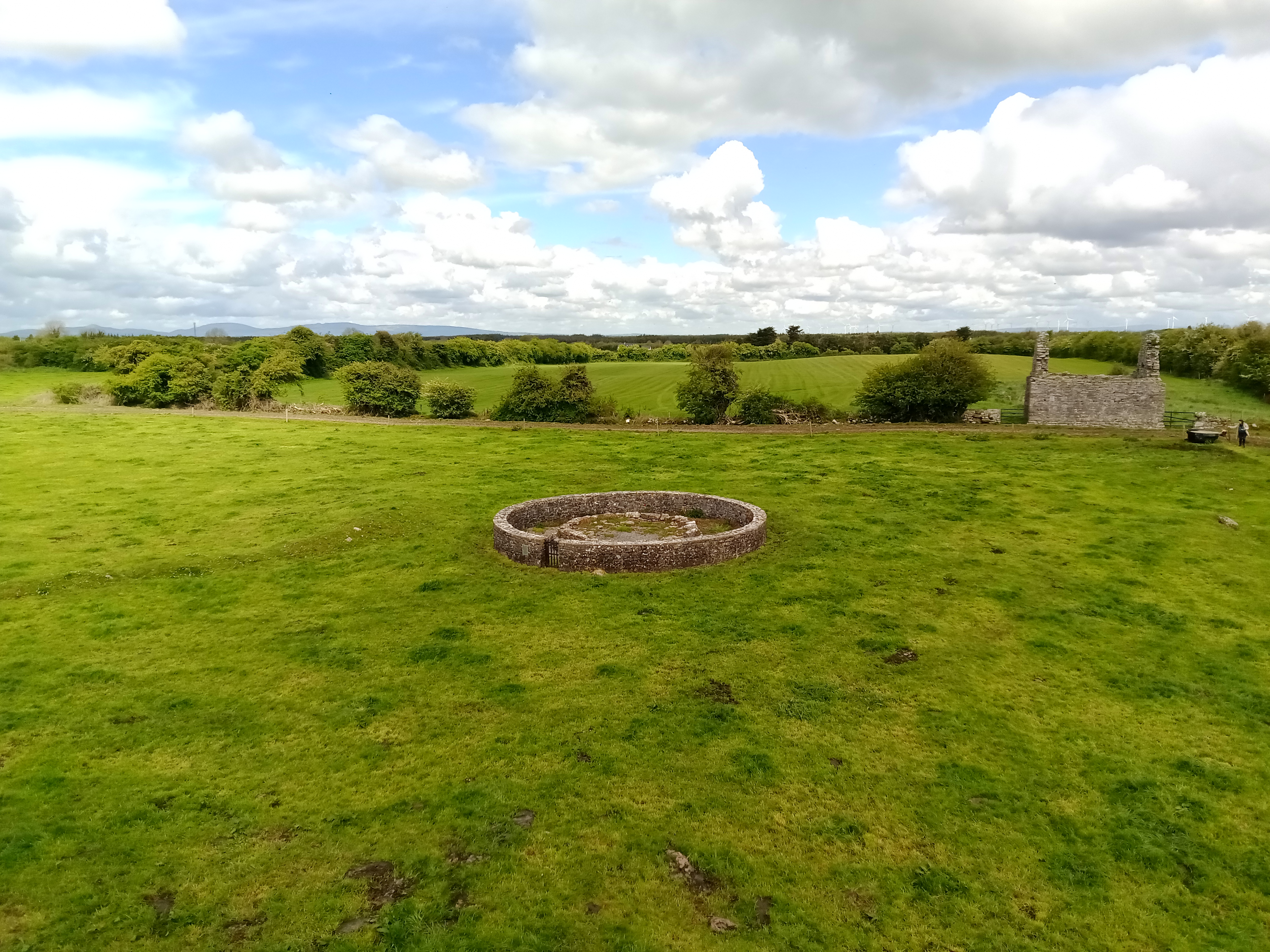
Ruins of the Liathmore-Mochoemóg monastery site in Leigh townland

Leigh (Irish: Liath, meaning 'grey place') is a townland in the civil parish of Twomileborris, County Tipperary, Ireland. It is 8.68 square kilometres (3.35 sq mi) in area. At the time of the 1911 census, there were 17 households in the townland. As of the 2011 census, Leigh townland had a population of 64 people in 18 occupied houses.

The medieval ecclesiastical site of Liathmore-Mochoemóg is within the townland.

== See also ==
- Liathmore Sheela-na-gig
