= Borris, Twomileborris =

Townland in County Tipperary, Ireland

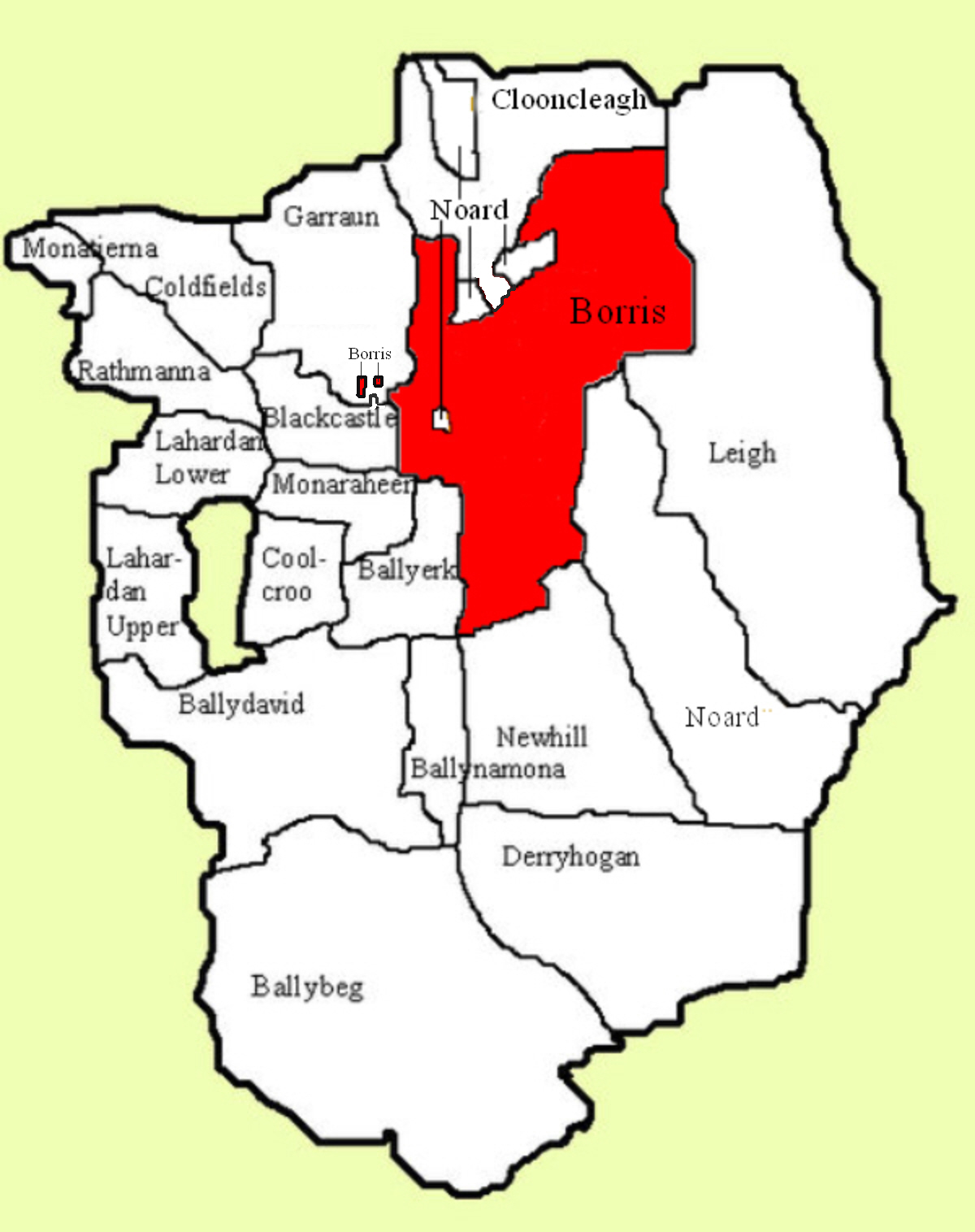
Borris in the context of the civil parish

Borris is a townland comprising a little over 1,327 acres in the civil parish of Twomileborris in County Tipperary, Ireland. At the time of the 1891 census, it had a population of 212; in 1891 this had fallen to 175 but had risen again to 190 at the time of the 1911 census.

The village of Two-Mile Borris is located in the centre-west of the townland.

== Enclaves and exclaves ==
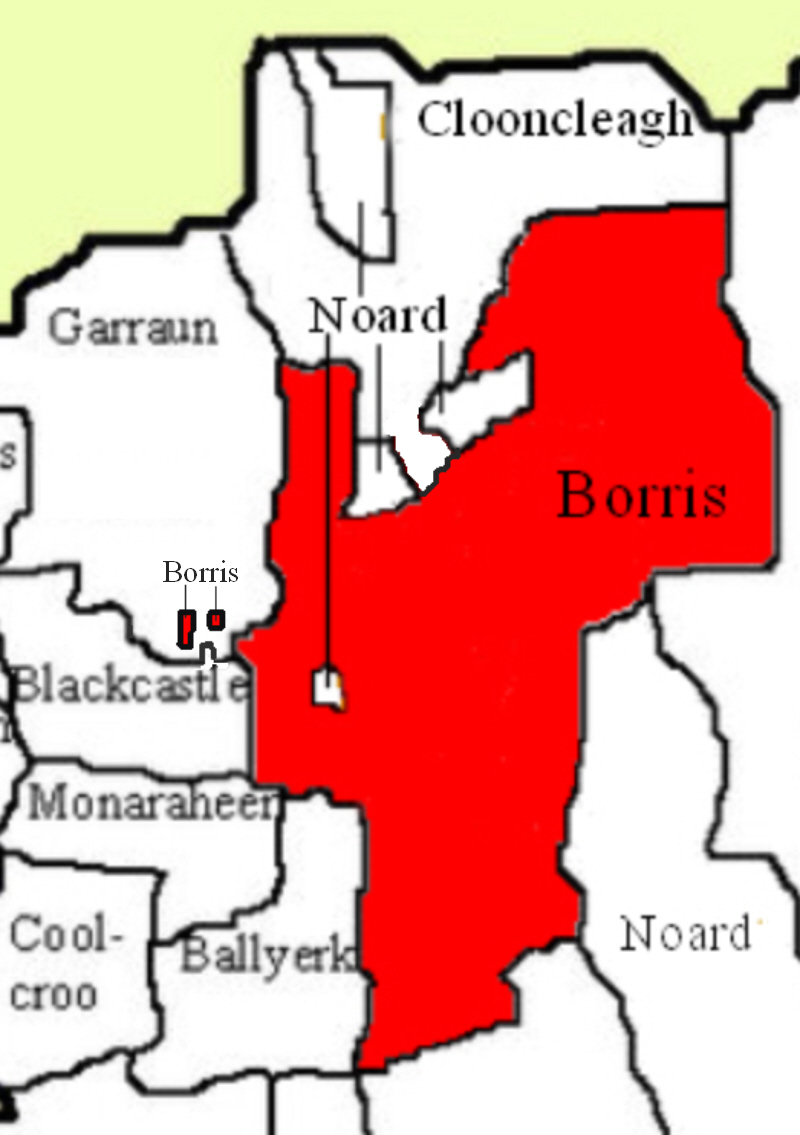
Borris townland, showing that it contains an enclave of Noard townland, is bounded on the north by other exclaves of Noard townland and has two exclaves of its own located to the west in Garraun townland

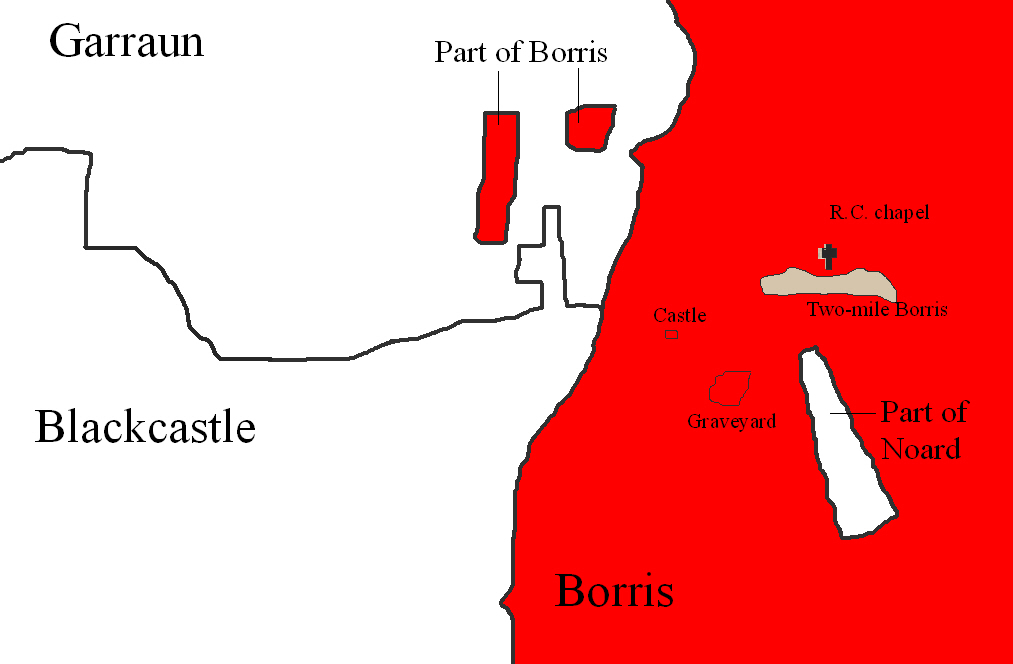
Exclaves and enclaves around Two-mile Borris, showing the extent of the village in mid-19th century

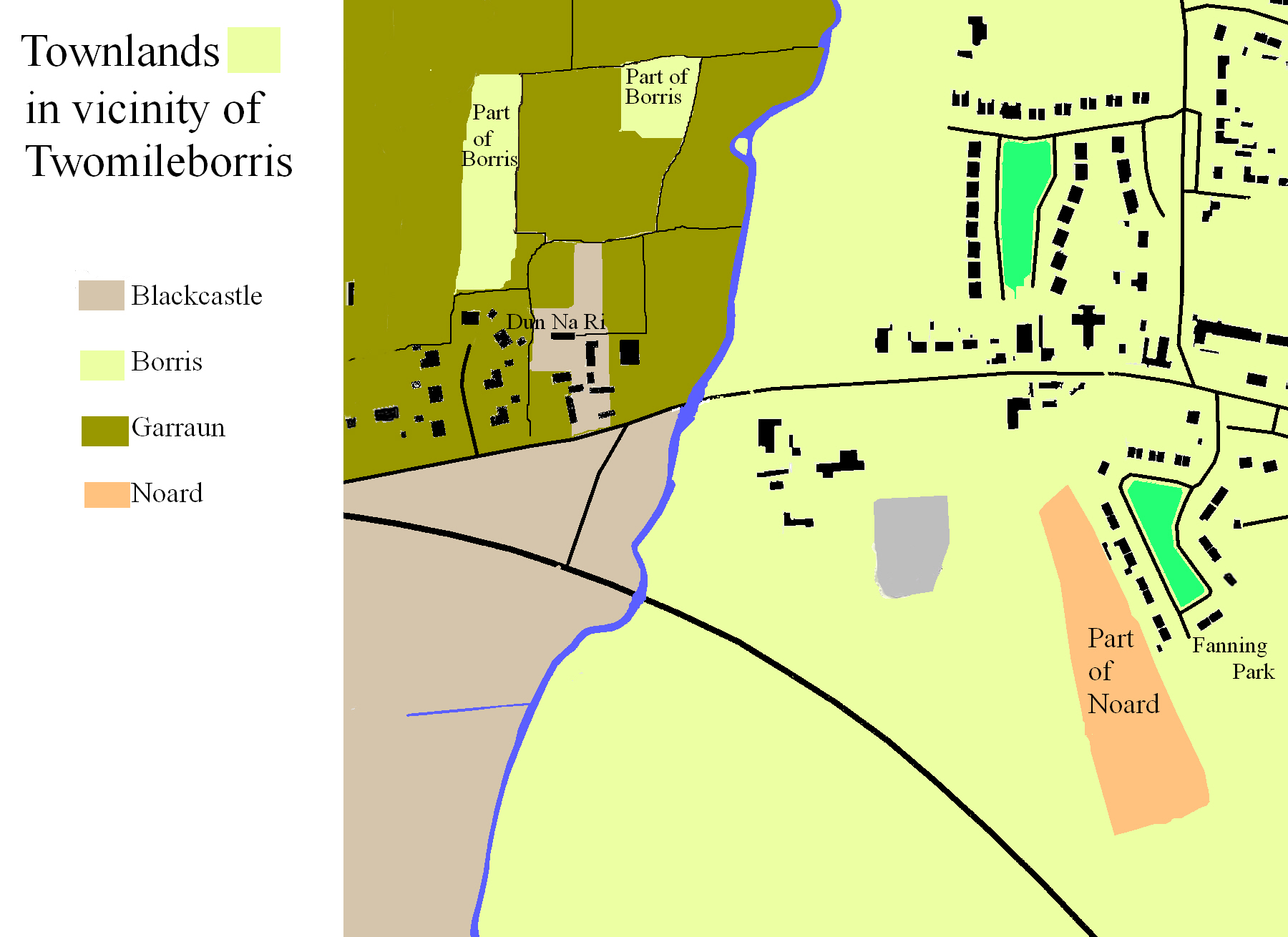
The modern houses and field boundaries in, and around, Twomileborris village, showing how these relate to the boundaries of the townland exclaves and enclaves

The townland illustrates how Borrisleigh civil parish is an interesting complex of enclaves and exclaves. It is bounded on the north by two of the four exclaves that belong to the neighbouring townland of Noard while another forms an enclave within Borris, lying just to the south of the historic core of the village of Two-mile Borris. The current Ordnance Survey map of the area shows that the ancient perimeter of this small enclave (which is just over three acres in size) is still present on the ground, as the boundary of a field which lies just to the west of the modern housing area called Fanning Park and to the east of the site of an old graveyard and the ruins of the castle.

Borris townland also has two, very small, exclaves of its own. They lie just to the west of the village of Two-Miles Borris and are surrounded by Garraun townland. The larger exclave has an area of just 1 acre 2 roods and 16 perches, while the smaller is only 3 roods and 26 perches in size. In the early 19th-century, the boundaries of these two exclaves were still almost completely reflected in the field boundaries of the time. By the late 19th century much less of the boundaries were still reflected as field boundaries. By the early 21st century, what little remained of the boundaries of these two exclaves formed part of the boundary of a field lying just to the north-east of the new housing area called Dún na Rí. The western edge of this field contained what remained of the eastern boundary of the larger exclave. The north-eastern corner of this field marked the north-eastern corner of the smaller exclave and short stretches of the edges meeting at this corner reflected the northern and eastern boundaries of the exclave.
