= Rahelty (civil parish) =

Civil parish in County Tipperary, Ireland

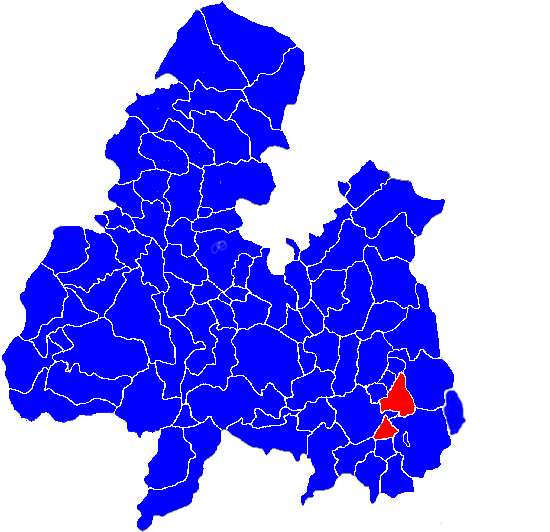
Location of Rahelty among the other civil parishes of North Tipperary

Rahelty, sometimes written Rahealty, is a civil parish in County Tipperary, Ireland. It is one of 21 civil parishes in the historical barony of Eliogarty. It contains eighteen townlands:

- Archerstown
- Athlummon
- Cassestown
- Coolaculla
- Corbally
- Drish
- Garranroe
- Knockanacunna
- Knockroe
- Kyle
- Lisduff
- Loughbeg
- Piercetown
- Rahelty
- Rathcriddoge
- Rathmanna
- Shanballyduff
- Townagha

The lands of the civil parish are divided into two disjoint areas by a strip of Thurles civil parish which stretches eastward to meet Borrisleigh civil parish. The, larger, northern area of Rahelty contains these ten townlands: Athlummon, Cassestown, Coolaculla, Garranroe, Knockanacunna, Lisduff, Piercetown, Rahelty, Rathcriddoge and Shanballyduff. The southern area contains the eight remaining townlands: Archerstown, Corbally, Drish, Knockroe, Kyle, Loughbeg, Rathmanna and Townagha.
