= Two-Mile Borris =

Village in County Tipperary, Ireland

Two-Mile Borris Buiríos Léith (Irish)
- Village
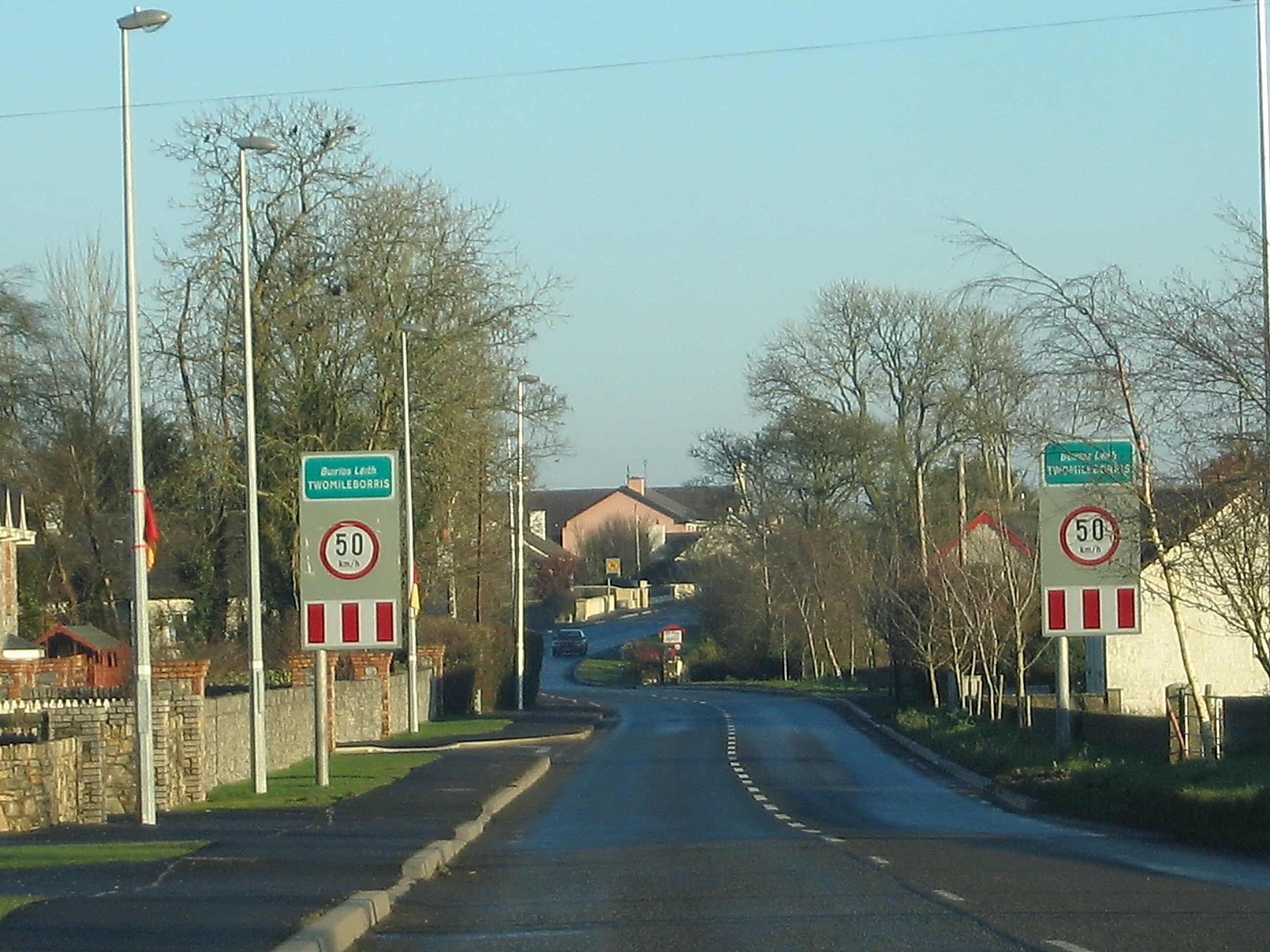
- Entrance to the village

- Location in Ireland
- Coordinates: 52°40′22″N 7°42′45″W
- Country: Ireland
- Province: Munster
- County: Tipperary
- Elevation: 120 m (390 ft)

Population (2016)
  - Total: 572
- Time zone: UTC+0 (WET)
  - Summer (DST): UTC-1 (IST (WEST))
- Irish Grid Reference: S194580

Two-Mile Borris (also written Twomileborris or Two Mile Borris; and locally Borris or TMB) is a village in County Tipperary, Ireland. The village is located on the L4202 road at the junction with the Ballyduff Road, close to the N75 and 4.7 mi (7.6 km) from Thurles town centre. It is also situated 1 mile from junction 5 of the M8 motorway. Its population was 572 as of the 2016 census, up from 502 in 2006. It is situated in the townland of Borris which is part of the civil parish of Twomileborris in the ancient barony of Eliogarty.

== History and etymology ==
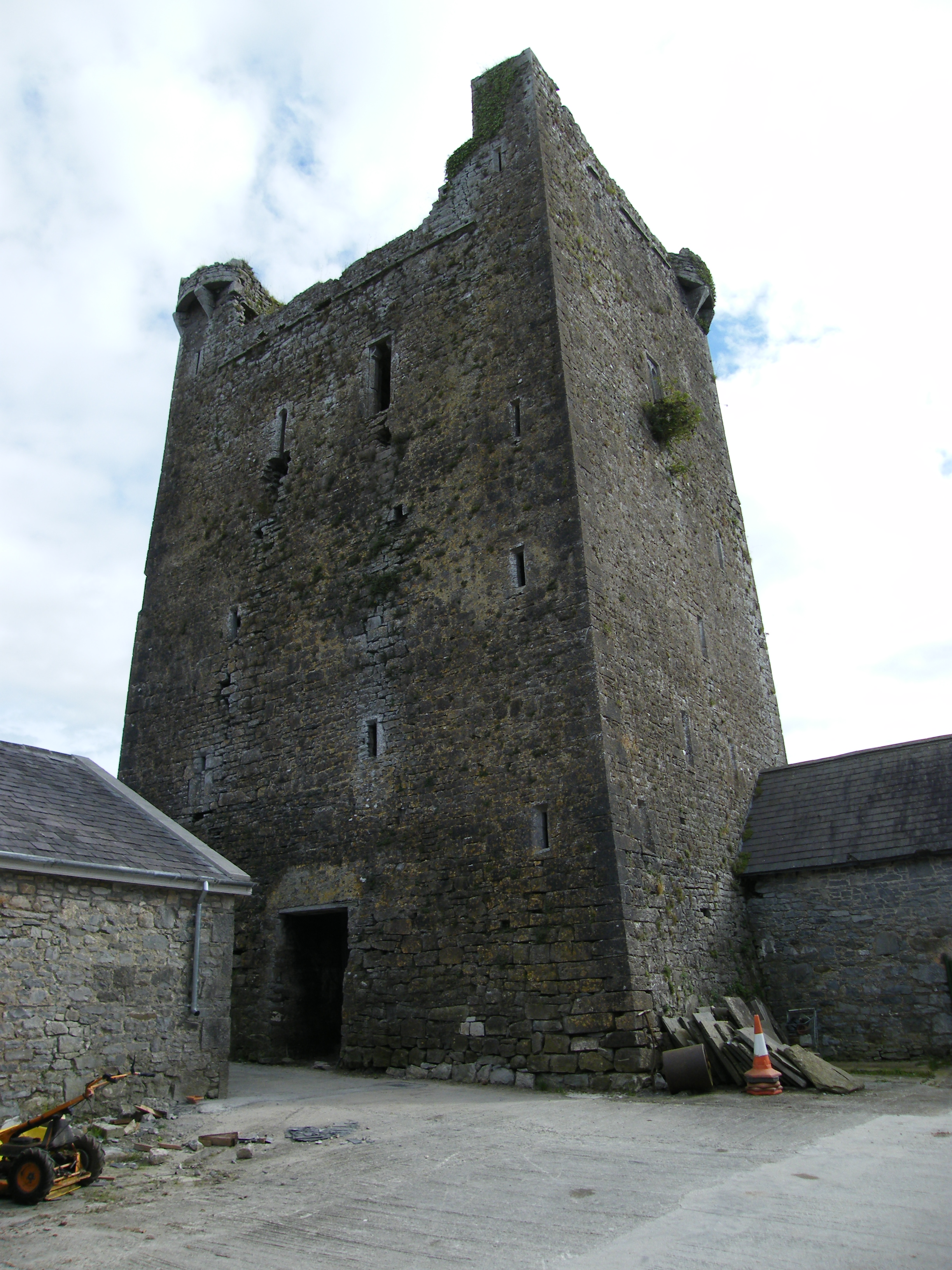
Castle (tower house) in Two-Mile Borris

The name Borris is generally believed to have come from the Norman word for a borough, district or stronghold. The Irish name Buiríos Léith was historically anglicised as Borrisleigh or Borris Leigh. The use of Leigh in the placename may be related to the monastic settlement of Liathmore-Mochoemóg in Leigh, about a mile and a half to the north-east of the village. Those who prefer the Irish name of Buirgheas Dhá Mhíle say that the name refers to King Mile, ancestor of Niall of the Nine Hostages.

In addition to the 7th century monastic site at Liathmore, evidence of ancient settlement in the immediate village area includes ringfort, ringwork, tower house and medieval ecclesiastical sites in the townlands of Blackcastle, Garraun and Borris. The Norman tower house (castle) at Two-Mile Borris is four storeys in height and now incorporated into a farmyard at the west side of the village.

As of the mid-19th century, the village was the property of Hugh Nugent O'Reilly. The local Catholic church, Saint James's church, was built c. 1830.

== Amenities and facilities ==
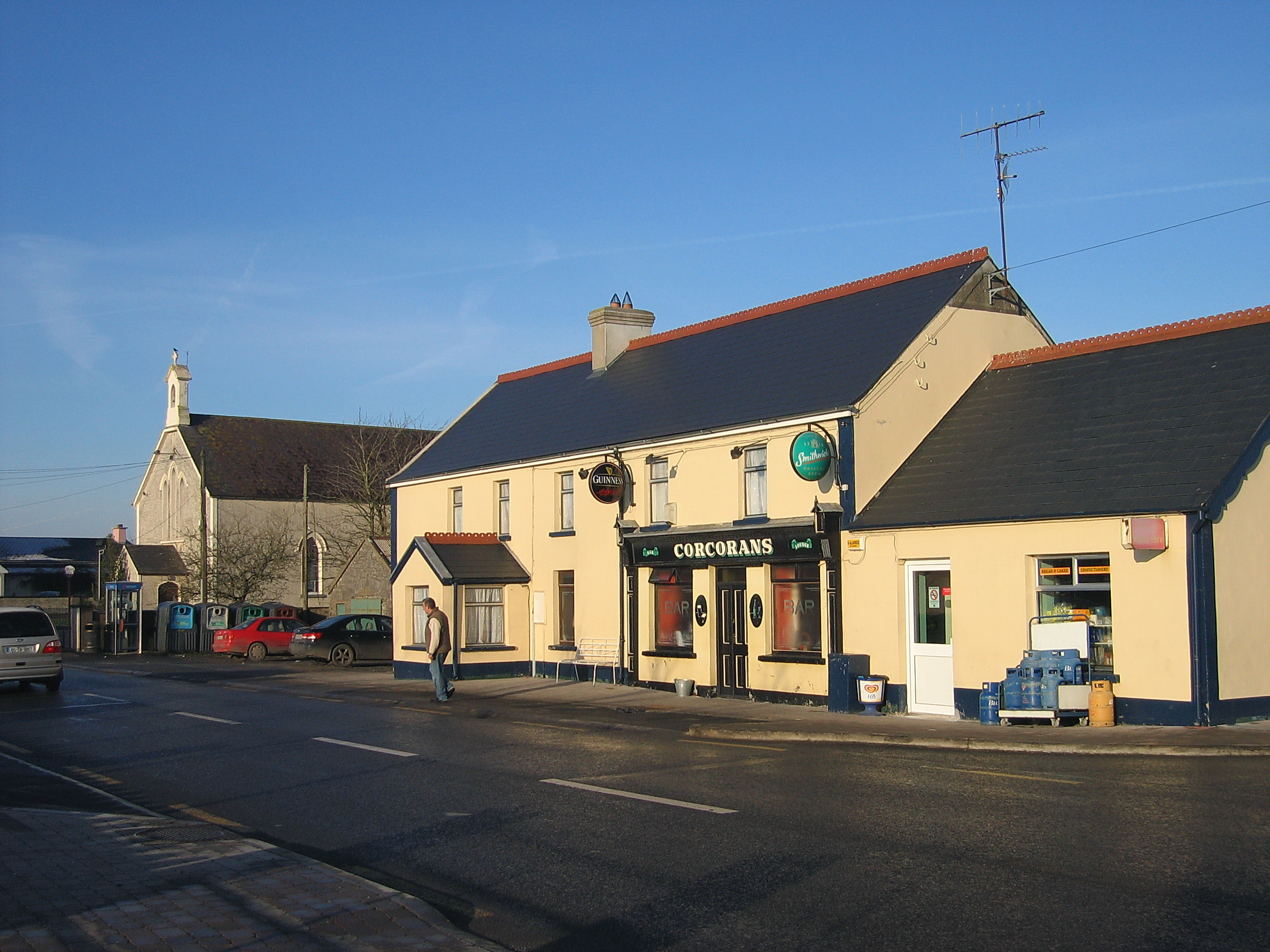
Church, pub and shop in Two-Mile Borris

Two-Mile Borris has a primary school, Catholic church, two pubs and two shops. There are a number of housing estates. The village is located at the edge of the Golden Vale and the Bog of Allen and so the quality of the land varies around the area, with most of the best farming land located to the west of the village. Parts of the land to the east are too boggy to be used, even for extracting turf. The village proper is bounded on the west by the Black River, a tributary of River Drish, which goes on to join River Suir. The approach, on the western side of the village, is dominated by a Norman tower house.

In June 2011, a planning application was approved by An Bord Pleanála for a casino, hotel and racetrack, proposed to be known as the Tipperary Venue. In September 2011, then Minister for Justice Alan Shatter confirmed that the proposed casino was not compatible with Ireland's gambling legislation and "ruled out" based on a cabinet decision. The proposed development's planning application, which had been opposed by An Taisce and others, expired in 2018.

== Notable people ==
- Martin Hayes (born 1959), Roman Catholic prelate and current Bishop of Kilmore, grew up in Borris

== See also ==
- List of towns and villages in the Republic of Ireland
- List of civil parishes of Tipperary
