= Thurles (disambiguation) =

Thurles is a town in North Tipperary.

Thurles may also refer to:

== Places ==
- Thurles (civil parish), which includes the town
- Thurles (Roman Catholic parish), which also includes the town but is larger than the civil parish
- Thurles Townparks, a townland in the civil parish which contains the older part of Thurles town
- Thurles (poor law union), a large area (195 square miles) which was named after the town because its workhouse was located on the latter's north-western edge
- Thurles Racecourse, a racecourse near Thurles town which stages horse racing

== Clubs and Societies ==
- Thurles Golf Club

== Other ==
- Viscount Thurles, a title in the Irish peerage
- Elizabeth, Lady Thurles (1587–1673)
