= Turtulla =

Turtulla may refer to:

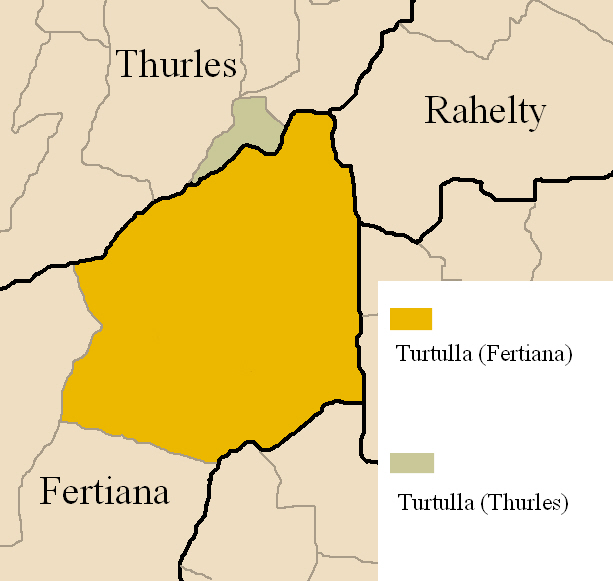
Distinction between Turtulla townlands in Fertiana and Thurles civil parishes

- Turtulla, Fertiana, County Tipperary, a townland in Fertiana civil parish in North Tipperary
- Turtulla, Thurles, County Tipperary, a townland in Thurles civil parish in North Tipperary
