= Art Teachers' Association of Ireland =

Art Teachers Association of Ireland
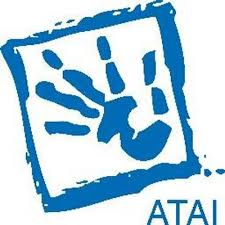
- ATAI, Established 1950
- Established: 1950
- Type: Subject Association
- Location: Ireland
- Affiliations: Teacher's Professional Network (TPN)
- Website: www.artteachers.ie

The Art Teachers Association of Ireland (ATAI) is a voluntarily run subject association group. Its main function is representing Art Teachers, (predominantly at post-primary level) in Ireland. The association is a member of the Subject Association Representative Groups (SARG).

The association was established in 1950. The association concerns itself with developing and promoting Art education in Ireland.
Over the years of its existence, it has been run by art teachers, for art teachers. There is a national executive that oversees policy and promotion, and over the years regional branches formed so that art teachers (usually working alone in their departments) could meet and share ideas and good practices.

As well as collaborating with SARG and TPN who help fund the association, the association often collaborates with the Initial Teacher Education colleges, such as NCAD LSAD and CIT such as the senior cycle teachmeet co-run with NCAD.

== Regional structure ==
The organisation is set up and run in a regional structure, usually tied to county borders. There historically have been several regions, currently there are:

- Cork
- Donegal
- Dublin
- Galway
- Tipperary/Limerick

== Conference ==
An annual conference is organised partially funded with TPN funding. The conference usually discusses methodologies, learning and will usually address topical issues.

== Leaving Certificate Art reform ==
In 2020, the Irish Leaving Certificate Art curriculum was updated for the first time since 1971, with the draft specification being called in 2017. There had been numerous calls for it to be updated to align with the then Junior Cycle curriculum, as changed in the 1990s. During that time, the ATAI represented art teachers in advocating for this change to happen. The 1971 syllabus had several elements

- Life Sketching (12.5%)
- Craft OR Design (25%)
- Still Life OR Imaginative Composition OR Abstract Composition (25%)
- History and Appreciation of Art (37.5%)
  - Irish Art History (12.5%)
  - European Art History (12.5%)
  - Appreciation of Art and Design (12.5%)

The syllabus was criticised for being too broad, having 6000 years of history to focus on, and in particular, the examination process, which could ask anything from Newgrange to Banksy.

=== 00's draft syllabus ===
There was a draft syllabus issued by the NCCA in consultation with interested bodies, such as the TUI, ASTI, SEC, and subject groups including the ATAI. Due to the economic crisis of 2008, and subsequent Irish recession, this syllabus was shelved indefinitely.

During the mid-2010s, the NCCA committed to reforming the art syllabus.

== Texaco Children's Art Competition ==
This competition started as an ATAI competition, and was adopted and sponsored by Texaco (then caltex).
