= Barbara Warren =

Barbara Warren may refer to:

- Barbara Warren (artist) (1925–2017), Irish painter
- Barbara Warren (athlete) (1943–2008), Austrian-American actress and triathlete
