= Thurles (Roman Catholic parish) =

Parish in Ireland

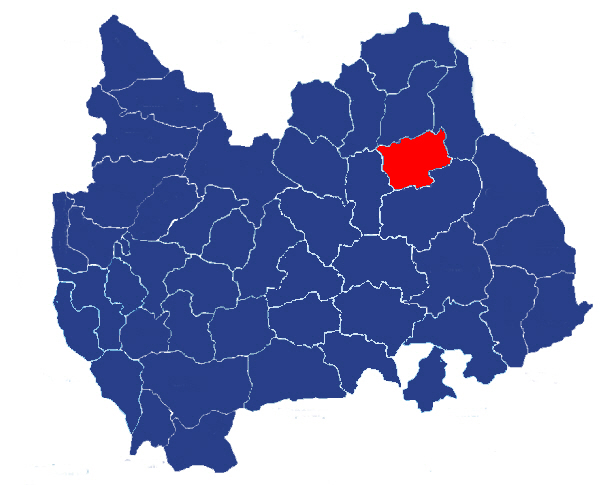
Location of Thurles Roman Catholic parish within Roman Catholic diocese of Cashel and Emly

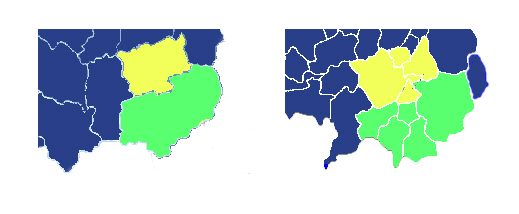
Comparison of the boundaries of (on the left) the Catholic parishes of Thurles (yellow) and Moycarkey-Borris (green) with those (on the right) of the civil parishes in the area

Thurles is an ecclesiastical parish in the Thurles deanery of the Roman Catholic Archdiocese of Cashel and Emly in Ireland.

There are two churches in the parish, both in the town of Thurles, County Tipperary:

- the Cathedral of the Assumption on the eastern side of the River Suir which passes through the centre of the town;
- Sts. Brigid & Joseph which is located on Bóthar na Naomh at the western edge of the town.

== Extent of the parish ==
Writing in 1837, Lewis said that "the R. C. parish [of Thurles] is co-extensive with that of the Established Church" which covered the same area as the civil parish of the same name. Today, however, the Roman Catholic parish includes the townlands in the civil parishes of Athnid (Adnith), Shyane and Rahelty. This situation was prefigured in Lewis's time because he wrote that "the living [of Thurles Church of Ireland parish] is ... partly united, by act of council, in 1682, to the vicarages of Rahelty, Shyane, and Adnith".
