= Turtulla, Fertiana =

Townland in County Tipperary, Ireland

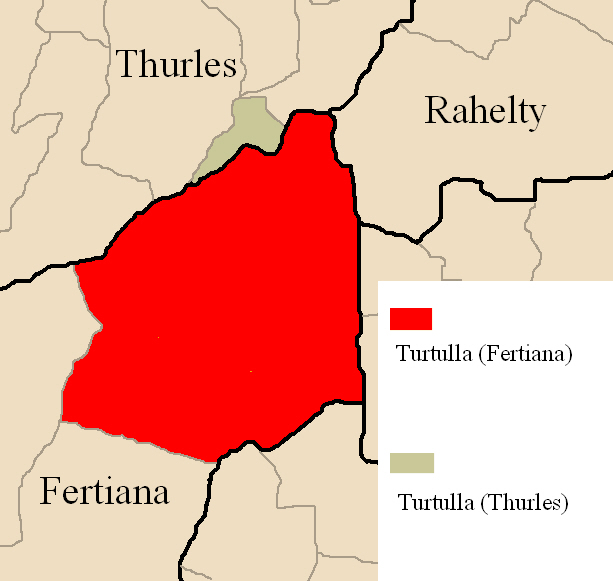
Turtulla townland in Fertiana civil parish (red) contrasted with the townland of the same name in Thurles civil parish

Turtulla is a townland in the civil parish of Fertiana, County Tipperary. It is a little over 790 acres in extent and is bounded on its northern edge by the River Suir, which separates it from another, much smaller, townland of the same name, which belongs to Thurles civil parish.

== Turtulla House ==
The townland house, Turtulla House, is now the clubhouse of Thurles Golf Club. The house and 218 acres were offered for sale in the Tipperary Star newspaper in February 1944 and were bought, for £6,100, on behalf of the club by a local solicitor, P. J. O'Meara.

A map of the area drawn in 1755 shows a house on the site.

Previous owners of the house included members of the Nicholson, Bailey and Maher families. Daniel O'Connell stayed in the house as the guest of the Mahers, when he addressed a "monster meeting" on a hill at nearby Knockroe on the outskirts of Thurles. Around this time, the house was renovated by a Clonmel-born architect, William Tinsley who later, in 1851, emigrated to the United States where he designed several important buildings. (Tinsley also renovated another Maher property, Tullamaine House, near Fethard). In the 1880s, the property passed from Valentine Maher to the Barry family from County Limerick and remained occupied until 1927, after which it lay empty until taken over by the golf club. In the early 1920s, the Barry family coachman, Denis Regan, was shot by the Black and Tans near the bridge close to the entrance of the property and left for dead; he survived and later became a hearse driver for a local firm of undertakers.
