= Thurles Townparks =

Townland in County Tipperary, Ireland

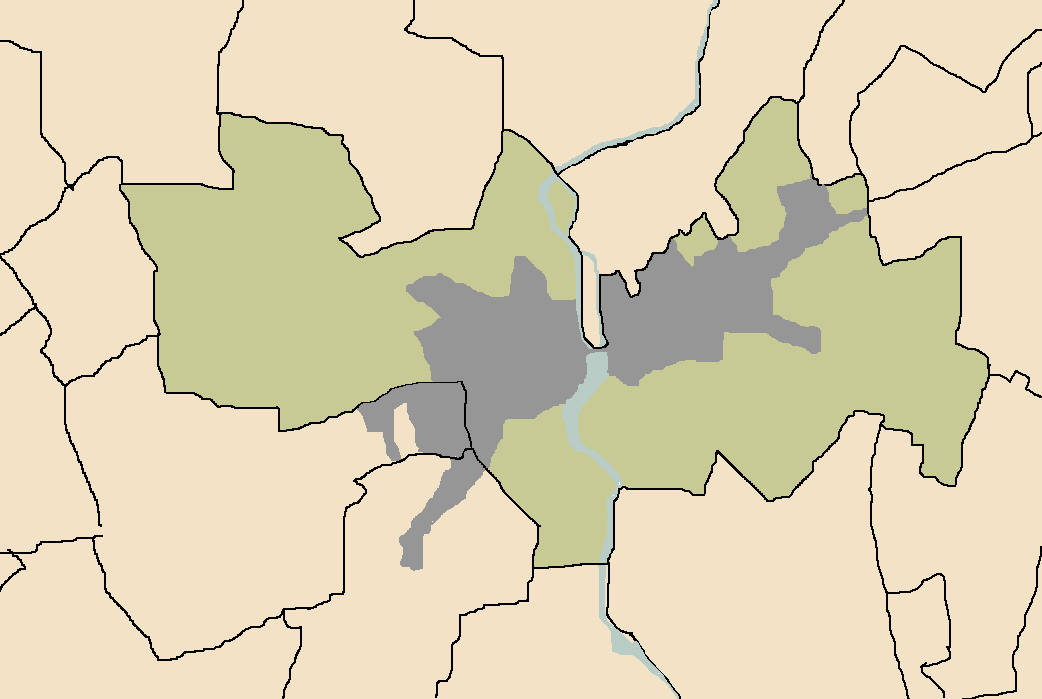
Outline map of the townland, showing the River Suir and the built-up area of the town as it was in the 1840s, some of which extends into the neighbouring townlands of Garryvicleheen and Stradavoher

Thurles Townparks is a townland of a little less than 365 acres in Thurles civil parish in County Tipperary.

The River Suir flows through the centre of the townland, with the older part of Thurles town on both banks. However, by the 1840s, the built-up area of the town had spread beyond the borders of the townland into the neighbouring townlands of Garryvicleheen and Stradavoher.
