= Róisín Madigan O'Reilly =

Irish musician (1903–1974)

- Born: Róisín O'Reilly; 21 January 1903; Dublin
- Died: 13 February 1974 (aged 71); Dingle

Róisín Madigan O'Reilly (Róisín Uí Mhadagáin Ní Raghallaigh) (21 January 1903–13 February 1974), was the youngest member of Cumann na mBan and a sound and radio pioneer.

== Biography ==
Róisín O'Reilly was born in Dublin on 21 January 1903 to E. O'Reilly, a lecturer in Irish Literature and E. Hessler, a German-born governess. Madigan O'Reilly spoke German, Irish and English as a child. She also spent time visiting her mother's family in Potsdam. The family were strong believers in an Irish Republic. Her father wrote both articles and poetry for the newspaper An Claidheamh Soluis. O'Reilly joined Cumann Na mBan when she was 13 becoming the youngest member. Her mother was also a member. She gave her first typewriter to Winifred Carney.

Madigan O'Reilly studied at the Dublin Metropolitan School of Art focusing on decorative lettering, calligraphy and illumination. She would create bricolage and collage art using elements of her father's words. Her work was noticed by the German publishing group Potsdam: Müller and Co. Verlag. Through them she saw the work of Kurt Schwitters which influenced her later projects, especially her translation into Irish of his work Ursonate in 1926.

In 1925 Madigan O'Reilly began working for Trinity College Dublin in a department that turned into the Preservation and Conservation department at Trinity Library. She worked on projects including re-binding of the Book of Aicill and the Brehon Laws. In 1930 Madigan O'Reilly married Edmund Madigan. He was involved with radio broadcasting. The couple had no children. Her husband died in 1950. In the 1930s Madigan O'Reilly provided technical support to her friend Máire Ní Chinnéide when she travelled to the Blasket Islands to record Peig Sayers' stories. She was a capable radio operator, composer, and sound artist, probably because of her husband's interest in radio. She is believed to be a founder member of the Irish Radio Transmitters Society in 1932. Although she donated a large collection of archives to the BBC they are believed destroyed in the Alexandra Palace fire.

Madigan O'Reilly retired in 1958 and moved to Dingle. There she worked on Irisches Traumbuch von Róisín O'Reilly. She focused on sounds including vowel sounds of the Irish language and the sound of wind and sea. Very little of her work is extant but Sisters Akousmatica claim her as inspiration. She is seen as an innovator of Irish avant-garde sounds.

She died in Dingle on 13 February 1974.

== Works ==
- Os Ard
- PrimAUDial Language Performances
- Voweling the Heaviside
- Irisches Traumbuch von Róisín O’Reilly
