= Ciaran Sweeney =

Irish fashion designer

Ciarán Sweeney (born 4 January 1971) is an Irish designer, producer, broadcaster, and writer. He has done work for Madonna, George Michael, Elton John, Pink and Kylie Minogue and Kate Eyre. He has exhibited at The Irish Museum of Modern Art, Royal Dublin Society and Trinity College Dublin.

== Early life ==
Sweeney was born and grew up in Ireland. He attended schools in Louth, Cork, Donegal and Sligo.

== Career ==
Sweeney studied at the National College of Art & Design in Dublin, with a focus on textiles. Upon graduation he worked as an art teacher. His design career began as costume designer to The Corrs.

=== Design and exhibitions ===
Sweeney has shown internationally including in Dublin Castle, Ireland; The State Museum of Architecture, Moscow, Russia; and The Natural History Museum, London.

Academy Award nominee Brenda Blethyn, President Mary McAleese of Ireland, Harry Potter actress Evanna Lynch, and French model Satya Oblette are some of his well-known clients.

He has presented or contributed on design internationally including NTV (Russia), RTÉ (Ireland), CityTV (Canada) and BBC (UK). Ciarán discovered IMG model Faye Dinsmore.

He has produced and directed shows in The Irish Museum of Modern Art, The Royal Dublin Society and Trinity College Dublin. In 2011 he art directed the British singer Lisa Stansfield at Studio Harcourt, Paris.

He is currently based in Paris.
