= Diana Copperwhite =

Irish painter

- Born: 1969 (age 56–57); Limerick, Ireland
- Education: National College of Art and Design; Winchester School of Art; Limerick School of Art and Design
- Known for: oil painting
- Style: Abstract expressionism
- Elected: Aosdána (2021)
- Website: dianacopperwhite.net

Diana Copperwhite RHA (born 1969) is an Irish painter. She is a member of Aosdána, an elite Irish association of artists. She lives and works in Dublin and New York City.

== Early life and education ==
Copperwhite was born in Limerick in 1969. She grew up in Patrickswell. Her father, Patrick Copperwhite, was a science teacher and self-taught artist who exhibited at the Oriel Gallery. She studied at Limerick School of Art and Design, the National College of Art and Design (NCAD, Dublin) and Winchester School of Art.

== Career ==
Copperwhite is chiefly known for her work in oil painting; art critic Gail Levin says that her work "creates an exquisite tension between abstraction and figuration or representation of any kind. […] vibrating spectral bands have become a kind of a trademark in Copperwhite’s recent large paintings […] Copperwhite believes that in her paintings she has responded to Ireland’s changeable weather, which may have caused her to see the world as if she was looking through a visor into a “grey low-light vision." She has also named 1960s psychedelic album covers as inspiration.

In a 2017 review for Hyperallergic, Copperwhite’s work was described as employing multicolored, banded brushstrokes that create gradient effects.The review noted that her paintings combine elements of abstract expressionism with a contemporary visual language influenced by digital aesthetics, and that they often incorporate fragmentary figurative forms within complex, layered compositions.

She has lectured at NCAD, Western Sydney University and the University of Massachusetts; she was elected to Aosdána in 2021.

In 2025, Copperwhite’s work was included in a Stoney Road Press exhibition at the Clifden Arts Festival, where her paintings were presented as fine art prints produced in collaboration with Stoney Road Press.

== Selected exhibitions ==
=== Solo ===
- 2026: The Only Thing Is The Everything, Kevin Kavanagh, Dublin
- 2024: Onomatopoeia, Flowers Gallery, London
- 2024 Born in the Echoes (two-person exhibition), day01 Gallery, Sydney, Australia
- 2023: Onomatopoeia, presented at Limerick City Gallery of Art; Highlanes Gallery; and Galway International Arts Festival
- 2019: The Clock Struck between time, 532 Gallery Thomas Jaeckel, New York
- 2018: Double Vision (two-person exhibition), Municipal Gallery, DLR Lexicon, Dublin
- 2018: Bounty (two-person exhibition), Kevin Kavanagh Gallery, Dublin
- 2016: Depend on the morning sun, Thomas Jaeckel gallery, New York
- 2016: Driven by Distraction, Royal Hibernian Academy, Dublin

=== Group ===
- 2025: TRUE COLOUR, Kevin Kavanagh, Dublin
- 2024: Shelter, Shell/Ter Collective, National Gallery of Ireland, Dublin
- 2024: Supernova, Flowers Gallery, London
- 2019: Vision X, Royal Hibernian Academy, Dublin
- 2018: Prism: The Art and Science of Light, The Glucksman, Cork
- 2017: Many Worlds, Centre Culturel Irlandais, Paris
- 2011: The Fold: A Painting Show, Visual Centre for Contemporary Art, Carlow

== Selected Collections ==
- The National Gallery of Ireland
- Mark Rothko Art Centre
- Irish Museum of Modern Art
- Arts Council of Ireland
- Limerick City Gallery of Art
- Netherlands Red Cross
- Áras an Uachtaráin
