= Catherine E. Greene =

Irish sculptor

Catherine Greene
- Born: 1960 (age 65–66); Ballinasloe
- Other names: Catherine McCormack
- Known for: sculpture
- Website: https://catherinegreene.com/

Catherine Greene (born 1960) is an Irish figurative sculptor.

== Biography ==
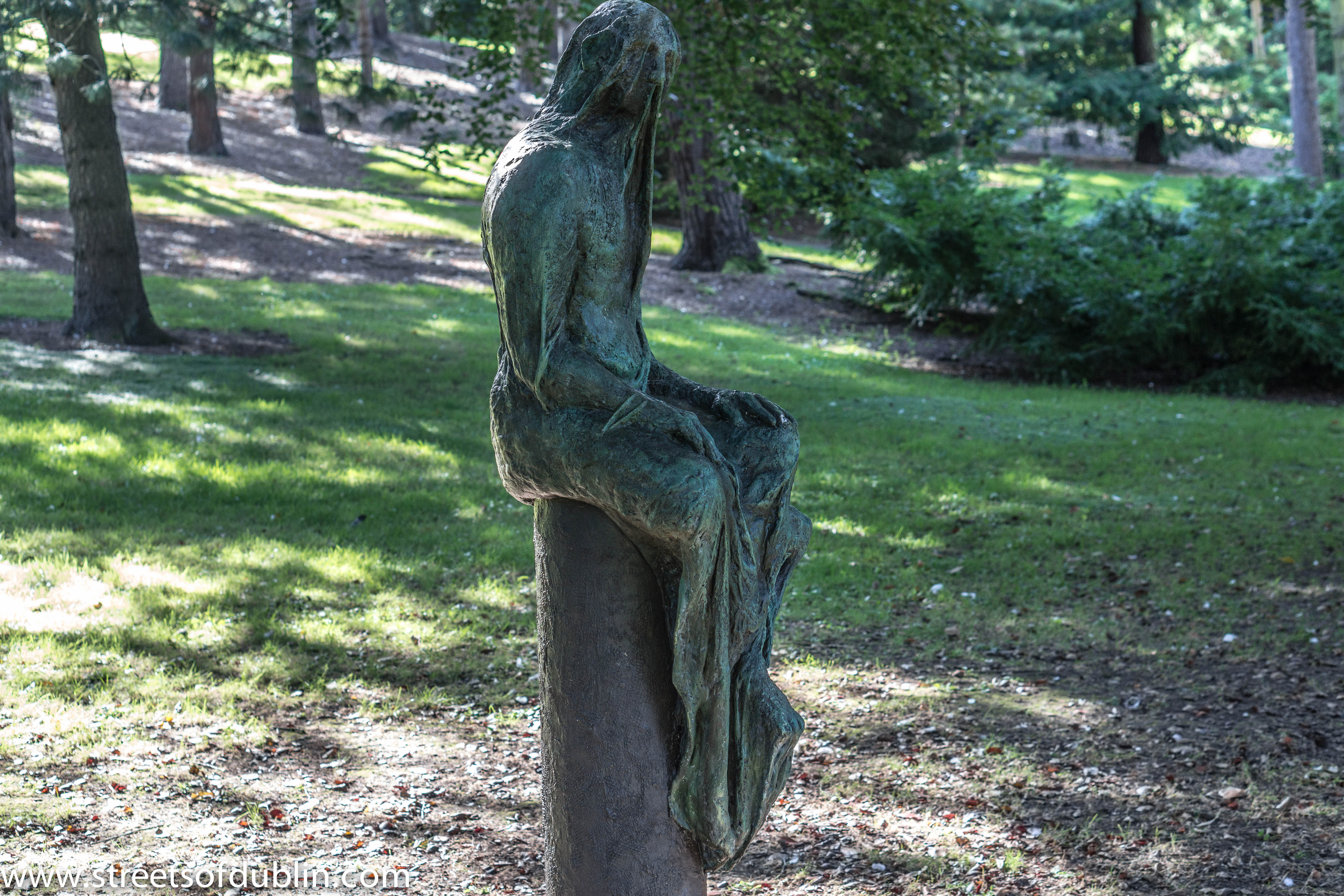
Sentinel by Catherine Greene- Sculpture In Context 2012 at the National Botanic Gardens

Catherine Greene was born in 1960 in Ballinasloe, County Galway though she now works in Castledermot, County Kildare. She completed her initial degree in sculpture from National College of Art and Design in 1984. Greene went on to lecture in the 1980s. Greene is known for working in both bronze and mixed media. Her piece, 'Portal', stands outside the UCD Sutherland School of Law who commissioned it.

Greene has had numerous solo exhibitions in Dublin as well as taken part in group exhibitions in Ireland and the United Kingdom. Greene has also been the artist in residence at the Centre Culturel Irlandaise, Paris. One of her pieces 'Christ on the Cross' is the centerpiece of the Basilica of Our Lady of the Rosary (Fátima) in Portugal.
