= Mairead O'hEocha =

Irish painter

- Born: 1962 (age 63–64); Dublin, Republic of Ireland
- Education: National College of Art and Design; Goldsmiths, University of London
- Known for: landscape painting, still life
- Elected: Aosdána (2020)

Mairead O'hEocha (/məˈreɪd oʊˈhoʊxə/; born 1962) is an Irish painter. She is a member of Aosdána, an elite Irish association of artists.

== Biography ==
O'hEocha was born in Dublin in 1962. She studied at the National College of Art and Design (NCAD, Dublin), graduating in 2000, and received a Master of Arts from Goldsmiths, University of London in 2004.

O'hEocha has had solo exhibitions at the Douglas Hyde Gallery, Butler Gallery and Temple Bar Gallery + Studios. Her work is held at the National Gallery of Ireland, Irish Museum of Modern Art and Arts Council of Ireland.

O'hEocha paints landscapes and still life, and cites Corot, Giorgio Morandi and Maureen Gallace as influences. She is also known for portraits of the taxidermied animals in the National Museum of Ireland – Natural History.

Writing in Artforum, Declan Long referred to her "muted, delicate realism [… her] more recent paintings have retreated from the exotic, varicolored splendor of this transformed outdoor world, they have found similar tonal blooming and formal growth in alternative, indoor subjects [… her] paintings flaunt self-conscious charm, but their attractions are assertive and unsettling, too." An RTÉ biography says that she "tends to work in series, focusing often on sets of seemingly unremarkable and disparate subjects. These allow her to explore elements of form, colour, gesture and composition, while reflecting on deeper aspects of human nature."

In 2016, she was included in Phaidon's Vitamin P3, as one of "the 108 International Artists Who Are Revolutionizing Painting Today." O'hEocha was elected to Aosdána in 2020. O'hEocha lives in Dublin.
