= Eddie Kennedy =

Irish oil painter (born 1960)

- Born: 1960 (age 65–66); Thurles, County Tipperary, Ireland
- Education: Limerick School of Art and Design; University of Cincinnati
- Known for: oil painting
- Elected: Aosdána (2017)
- Website: eddiekennedystudio.ie

Eddie Kennedy (born 1960) is an Irish painter. He is a member of Aosdána, an elite Irish association of artists.

== Early life ==
Kennedy was born in Thurles in 1960.

== Career ==
Kennedy studied at Limerick School of Art and Design, exhibiting at the Douglas Hyde Gallery in 1982 and graduating in 1983. He also attended the University of Cincinnati, receiving his Master of Fine Arts in 1989. He is chiefly active in oil painting of landscapes and seascapes, on canvas and linen.

In 2017 he won a Pollock-Krasner Foundation award and was elected to Aosdána.

According to artist Randall Exon, "There is always a surprise in Eddie’s paintings, but the surprise is never provocative as much as it is evocative. Meaning is everywhere and in everything. It is the range of emotion and spirit that so impresses."

== Personal life ==
Kennedy lives and works in Dublin and County Mayo.
