= Miriam Mone =

Irish fashion designer

Miriam Mone (20 February 1965 – 22 February 2007) was an Irish fashion designer.

Mone was born and raised near Loughgall County Armagh, Northern Ireland. At an early age, she became determined to pursue a career in fashion, mastering pattern making and sewing machine use by the age of eight. She was accepted into Foundation Art at Preston Polytechnic in Lancashire, studying there from 1983-1984. She then went on to attend Limerick School of Art and Design from 1984 - 1987 and completed her training there. During her time in Limerick, she won a string of awards, such as the Satzenbrau Award for Partywear, Design Graduate of the Year, among others. After graduating she worked in a few companies at the lower end of the market, but quickly realised that this was not for her, and she needed to move up the more glamorous and sophisticated end of the business.

In 1990, Mone won the Grolsch "Question of Style Award" which as a prize placed her in the Irish Design Centre, a retail outlet for top-end Irish design talent. Very quickly her reputation spread and other Irish retail outlets began to stock the label to meet the growing demand. She won the Coat Designer award at The Late Late Show Fashion Awards in 1993, and went on to win the Designer of the Year at the same awards in 1995. When Irish president Mary McAleese was elected in 1997, she selected Mone to design her inauguration outfit. Mone also designed much of the president's daywear and also the staff uniforms for Áras an Uachtaráin.

== Personal life ==
Miriam Mone met her future husband, Willie Healy in September 1986, and they married three years later; they had two daughters, born in 2003 and 2005. Miriam Mone Healy was diagnosed with ovarian cancer in February 2006 and died one year later in Dublin, aged 42.
