= Shyane =

Parish in Ireland

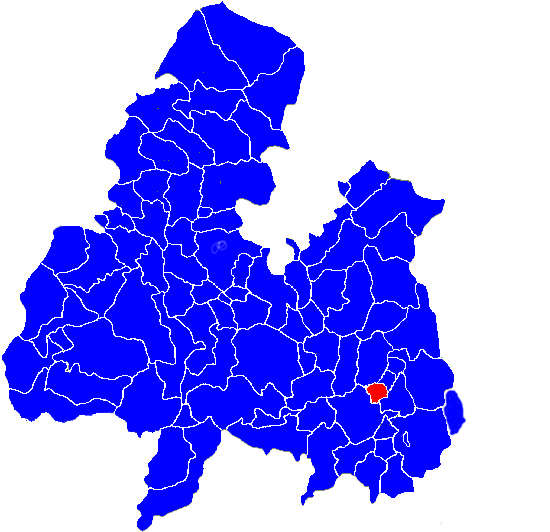
Location within north Tipperary

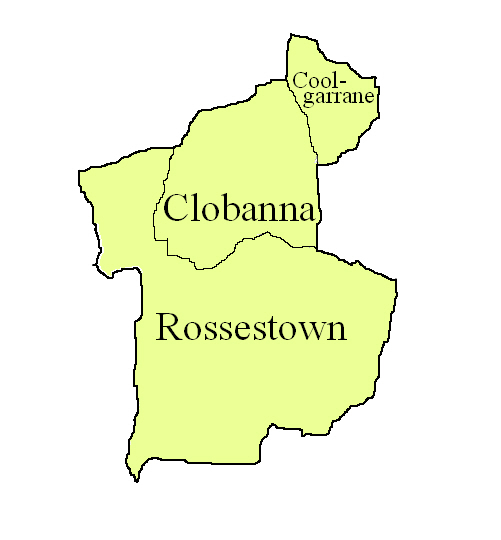
Townlands in the parish

Shyane (Irish: An Sián meaning a fairy mound) is a civil parish in County Tipperary, Ireland. It is one of 21 civil parishes in the historical barony of Eliogarty. It is divided into three townlands: Clobanna (containing a little over 243 acres), Rossestown (a little over 587 acres) and Coolgarrane (a little over 77 acres).

== Church of Ireland parish ==
Like all civil parishes, this civil parish is derived from, and co-extensive with a pre-existing Church of Ireland parish of the same name. (However, the Ecclesiastical Annals for the Church of Ireland diocese of Cashel say that the parish was sometimes called Templeshyane).

The first Ordnance Survey map of the area shows a graveyard and the ruins of Templeshyane church in the north-eastern corner of Clobanna townland, with one parcel of glebe land surrounding them and another parcel of glebe land in the southern part of the townland.

An article in volume 42 of the Dublin University Magazine, dated 1853, refers to the church and graveyard as Templeshane, which it translates to English as "John's Church".

Although by the time of the first Ordnance survey Shyane parish was divided into three townlands, the Ecclesiastical Annals for the Church of Ireland diocese of Cashel say that there was only one townland, which it named "Clotanna", in the parish.

Writing in 1837, Lewis said that the vicarage of Shyane was "partly united, by act of council, in 1682" to the living of the Church of Ireland parish of Thurles.
