= Anne Seagrave =

Irish live/performance artist

Anne Seagrave is an Irish live/performance artist, whose career spans from the early 1980s to the present. Seagrave has won multiple awards, notably the Arts Foundation's "Live Performance Art" award in 2002.

== Career ==
Between 1982 and 2008, Seagrave presented her live art performances extensively around the world in galleries, festivals and non-traditional arts spaces, as well as making site-specific performances. Seagrave lived in a number of countries throughout her career including the UK, Ireland and Spain. Although she retired from making live art performances in 2008 she did present a new live work in 2011 in York, England, entitled 'JESTEM'. She currently lives in Kraków.

Her performances have been critically acclaimed, and Seagrave has contributed significantly to the development of live art practice both within the countries where she resided and further afield. Bristol University notes her "distinctive movement-based works in performance, video and installation".

She is an Honorary Associate of the National Review of Live Art (NRLA), an annual festival of live art that took place in Glasgow from 1979-2010. Seagrave has presented a number of works at the festival, including Or Even What Leaving Was (1990), Falling Into People's Mouths (2001), Deja Vu (2005), and Jamais Vu (2005).

Seagrave's work "uses rhythm and repetition and fuses movement pieces, monologues, multimedia film and video works together". Some of her works, for example Jamais Vu, use highly physical and choreographed actions. In this performance, Seagrave, with a rectangular piece of mirror covering her breasts, repeated a sequence of actions for durational periods while interacting with everyday objects such as a tin bucket and a domestic tap fitting.

Seagrave worked as a visiting lecturer at the National College of Art and Design in Dublin and Limerick School of Art and Design. In 2004, Seagrave began a three-year Arts and Humanities Research Council (AHRC) Fellowship at the University of Ulster in Belfast, creating an online database called, Why Me? Artists' Use of Self-Image. This features the work of 340 artists that use "their own physical presence within the artworks they present".

In 2006, Seagrave participated in a residency at the Irish Museum of Modern Art, Dublin, and was invited to perform in Israel, Argentina, Uruguay, Spain, Ireland, England, Finland and Poland.
