= Borroway Rovers =

- Full name: Borroway Rovers Football Club
- Nickname(s): Hungry Hill
- Founded: 2002
- Ground: Loughtagalla Park, Thurles, County Tipperary
- Capacity: 400
- Chairman: Bernard Keane
- Manager: Bernard Keane
- League: NT&DL Division 1
- 2009-2010: Division 2 Champions (First Title)
Home colours	Away colours

Borroway Rovers F.C. (Irish: An Cumann Peile Ruagairí Slí na Bhealaigh) is an association football club based in Thurles, County Tipperary. The club plays in the North Tipperary & District Division 1 having been promoted as champions from Division 2 in 2009/2010. The club's playing colours are red with white trim although they have previously used white and black trim and navy and white trim. The club's home ground is Loughtagalla Park and its main rival is Thurles Celtic, with whom they share the park.

== History ==
The Borroway Rovers F.C. was re-formed in 2002 (their previous incarnation existed in the late 70's/80's) when they had one junior team. Success eluded them in their first two seasons but they succeeded in assembling a good group of local lads. The club struck gold in the 2004/2005 season when they annexed their first trophy by winning the Second Division Shield Final.

In the 2005/2006 season the club won the Fast Food Cup, beating Rearcross

The following season saw them again reach The Fast Food Final but this time they were beaten by Ballymackey.

In 2008/2009 Borroway were very unlucky in the Division 2 League and missed out on promotion by a mere couple of points. They contested the Cup Final for a record fourth year in a row. This time they won the Nora Kennedy Cup which replaced The Fast Food Cup. Borroway Rovers also took part in last seasons FAI Junior Cup and beat Borrisoleigh before advancing to meet South Tipp "big guns" Cahir. They lost this game 0-2.

In March 2010 Borroway won the league title and played in Division 1 the next season (2010/2011).

=== 2009 Second Division Cup Final ===
Borroway Rovers won the Second Division Cup title against Cloughjordan 'B' on a dramatic penalty shootout 3-2.

== Borroway Rovers 2009 - 2010 ==
=== Committee ===
Bernard Keane (Chairman)

Eilish Treacy (Secretary)

Owen Ryan (Treasurer)

Veronica Moore

Cecilia Keane

=== Management ===
Bernard Keane (Manager)

Michael Callanan (Assistant Manager)
