= Eamon Colman =

Irish painter (born 1957)

- Born: 1957 (age 68–69); Dublin, Ireland
- Education: National College of Art and Design
- Known for: oil painting
- Style: Landscape painting
- Spouse: Pauline O'Connell
- Parent: Seámus Ó Colmáin (father)
- Elected: Aosdána (2007)
- Website: eamoncolman.com

Eamon Colman RHA (born 1957) is an Irish painter. He is a member of Aosdána, an elite Irish association of artists.

== Early life ==
Colman was born in Dublin in 1957. His father, Seámus Ó Colmáin, was an artist. Eamon Colman attended a Christian Brothers school; then Dalton School, a Jewish school in Rathmines; and then a Protestant school. He worked as a labourer and studied landscape gardening.

== Career ==
Colman studied at Trinity Arts Workshop and the National College of Art and Design (NCAD, Dublin), beginning his professional career in 1979. He had a major retrospective exhibition at the Royal Hibernian Academy in 1997 and was elected to Aosdána in 2007. He was a member of the Toscaireacht, Aosdána's ten-member ruling committee, in 2020 and 2021.

His paintings often depict the mountains of County Kilkenny and the nearby rivers, the Suir and Barrow. According to critic Aidan Dunne, Colman "built his reputation and following as a painter of works that combine an evident delight in the lively play of colour and form with allusions to mythic or magical narratives. There was, in a great deal of his work, usually an interplay between the landscape per se and the inner, imaginative landscape."

== Personal life ==
Colman lives in the hills of northeast County Kilkenny. His wife, Pauline O'Connell, is also an artist.
