= Dew Valley Foods =

Irish cooked bacon manufacturer

- Trade name: Dew Valley Meats
- Type: Private (unlimited company)
- Industry: Food processing
- Predecessor: Blake's Victualler
- Founded: April 14, 1981 (incorporated)
- Headquarters: Thurles, County Tipperary, Ireland
- Products: Cooked bacon
- Owner: Dew Valley Foods UK Limited
- Number of employees: c.400 (2022) c.1000 (2026)
- Website: dewvalley.com

Dew Valley Foods is an Irish manufacturer of cooked bacon. It is based on the Holycross Road, near Thurles, County Tipperary. It supplies foodservice, quick-service restaurant and food-manufacturing customers. It has supplied McDonald's restaurants in Europe since 2013 and Wetherspoons restaurants since 2010. The company is privately owned by Jack Blake. As of 2024, it is considered one of the largest producers of cooked bacon in Europe.

== History ==
=== Blake's Victualler (1830–1988) ===
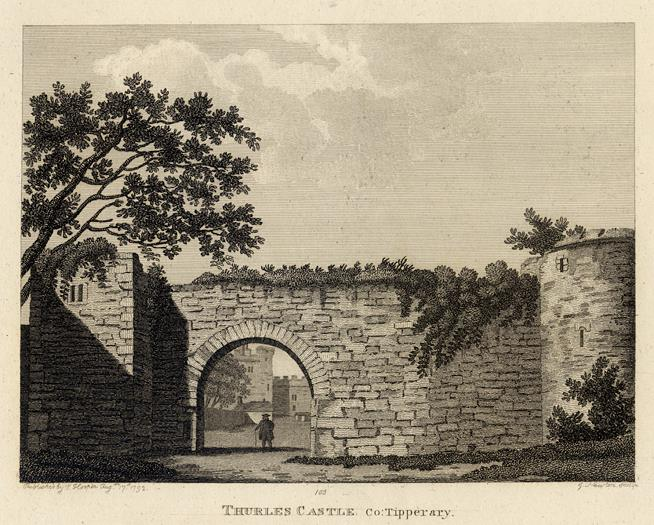
18th-century engraving of West Gate ("The Gate") before it collapsed

The Blake family were victuallers and butchers at Westgate, Thurles, from as early as the 1830s with John Blake and Maurice Blake, who is the great-great-grandfather of the current owner of Dew Valley Foods.

John Blake traded at "The Gate" in 1866. He is listed as a butcher in Slater's Directory of 1870.

His shop and house collapsed on 28 April 1868 when a medieval structure (from the West Gate) fell, which is represented in an 18th-century engraving. No one was killed, and the business was re-established in a house at the corner of Kearney's Lane, Westgate. The gate was later removed entirely, and by 1889 its site was marked by the houses of William Maher, a draper, and a Mrs Blake.

Nenagh Guardian article from 2 May 1868, about the West Gate collapse on Blake's facilities

When John Blake (1839–1882) died, his widow Johanna kept the shop. An 1889 directory lists a Mrs J. Blake of West Gate among Thurles victuallers, marked as a cattle shipper. Their son John (1877–1926) later becomes a butcher at Westgate. Another son William (born 1879) ran a grocery and spirits business at 17–18 Liberty Square.

Old newspaper advertisement published in 1934

John Joachim Blake (1914–1998) succeeded to his father in running the family business. A photograph of two Blake's Victualler family members features on a newspaper's front page on 2 July 1949. On 21 May 1983, newspapers marked the 150th anniversary of Blake's butchers with a special edition of multiple pages detailing its history. Blake's Victualler and W. Blake shops both advertised very regularly in local (The Tipperary Star mostly) and national newspapers.

In 1988 the family sold the Westgate butcher shop to the Carway family who kept it running as a butcher shop. The meat processing business remained with the Blakes. John Joachim Blake was a director of Dew Valley Foods UK Limited from 1997 until 3 December 1998, the day he died. The building of the original shop still stands and has been used by multiple businesses other than victualling. In 2024, tributes in newspapers describe a Thurles man who worked in the butcher trade at "Blake's" and at Dew Valley Meats.

Traditionally, historians report that Irish bacon curers were vigorously defending their brands. A trade profile describes the company as originating in the butchery trade, starting as craft butchers in Thurles selling beef and pork to the local community before concentrating on pork and bacon.

Business succession and family tree
  - John Blake — established a family of butchers and merchants originating in Stradavoher, Thurles. The business is documented as early as 1830 under the name Blake Butchers, and John Blake was recorded as a victualler in 1843.
  - Maurice Blake (1795–1869) — based in Stradavoher; became head of the family butchery business during the 1850s.
    - John Blake (1839–1882) — managed the family shop at Westgate, Thurles. He married Johanna Maher (1847–1926), daughter of a butcher in Cashel. Following John's death in 1882, Johanna took over the business and employed her brother to assist in its operation.
      - John Blake (1877–1926) — succeeded to the management of the Westgate business. He developed its international trade, personally organising imports and exports to Great Britain. He married Aileen Lane (1888–1962). Following her husband's death in 1926, Aileen initially considered selling the business but ultimately decided to continue running it, assisted by her children and employees.
        - Maurice Blake (1921–2000) — initially worked at the Westgate shop before establishing his own butcher's shop in Ballyfermot, Dublin. He subsequently opened his own slaughterhouse and several additional shops, sometimes in partnership with another businessman. As cattle markets in Dublin began to close, he retired during the 1970s or 1980s and sold his principal shop to F. X. Buckley. He also encouraged his relative Alan Thornton, who operated a bicycle shop in Rathgar.
        - John Joachim Blake (1914–1998) — took over the principal Westgate shop, together with the family's fields, farms and slaughterhouse. He subsequently established a processing plant or factory and sold the shop during the 1980s.
          - John Patrick (Jack) Blake (born 1958) — joined his father in managing the family enterprise. He subsequently established the international food company Dew Valley Foods.
            - John W. Blake (born 1989) — joined the company and became responsible for one of its departments under his father's leadership.
      - Katie Blake (1867–1937) — married William Coady (1875–1962), owner of a bakery in Thurles.
        - John J. Coady (1909–1996) — succeeded to the management of the family bakery.
      - William Blake (1879–1969) — established his own grocery and spirits business at The Liberty, Thurles.
        - Rosalie O'Neill (née Blake) (1933–2024) — succeeded to the management of the business, expanded its range of products and subsequently reduced its operations to part of the original premises.
    - Patrick Blake (1855–1922) — worked in the family butchery business.
    - Maurice Blake (1840–1916) — also worked in the family butchery business for a period.
    - Margaret Blake (1851–1936) — married Martin Cullagh, who operated a bakery on Friar Street, opposite the Blake butchery.
      - James Cullagh (1880–?) — worked as an assistant at the Blake butcher's shop until 1913, under the supervision of his cousin John Blake.
      - Patrick Cullagh (1885–1973) — worked as an assistant in both the Blake butcher's shop and its associated slaughterhouse.
Runs the business Works in the business Spouse Other merchants/shops Spouse running the business

=== Dew Valley Foods (1980–today) ===
==== Incorporation and expansion ====
The company was incorporated in 1981. Sources date its start of production to 1984, its establishment to 1987 and its move to the current site to 1990 or 1993. Dew Valley Foods UK Limited was incorporated in March 1997. John Patrick Blake, otherwise named Jack Blake in newspaper articles, has been its director and secretary since then. A 1999 article gave 1988 as the year of establishment and recorded 95 employees, with a £10 million expansion under way that was expected to double capacity.

The Blake's Victualler shop and the Dew Valley factory as simplified schematic illustrations

In October 2008 the government announced a €21.8 million investment, supported by Enterprise Ireland. It funded a research centre and 55 jobs. The company then had 160 employees. The investment also covered expanded production capacity and an employee skills programme. About 90 per cent of output was exported. This included about 500 tonnes a month to the United Kingdom.

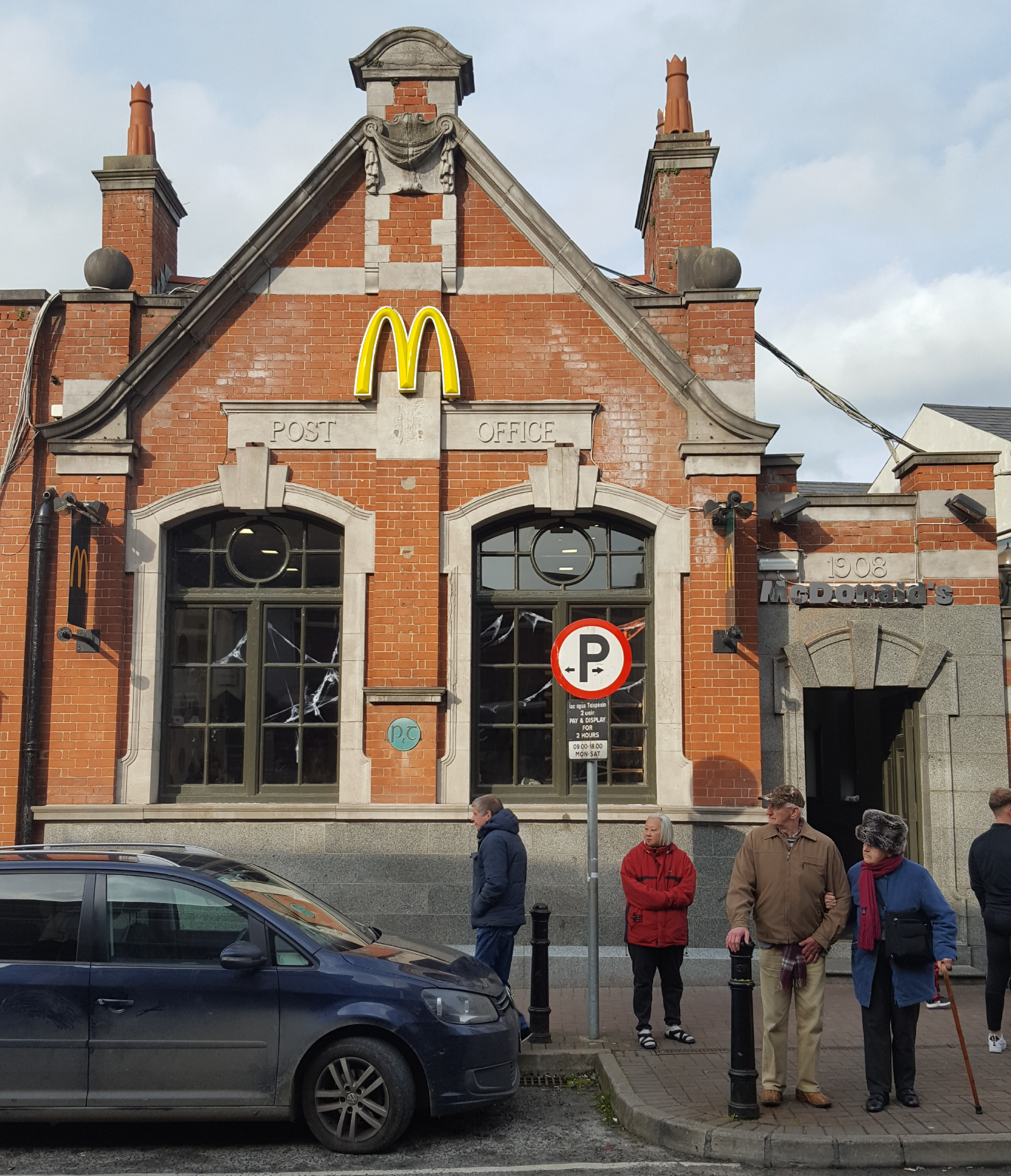
A McDonald's restaurant in Ireland (Navan town)

McDonald's partnership

In September 2013 Dew Valley won a contract to supply all 84 McDonald's restaurants in Ireland. The contract covers up to nine million pieces of bacon a year. McDonald's had previously imported bacon from the United Kingdom. The volume was equivalent to about 36 tonnes annually. The bacon was intended for breakfast items, burgers and some chicken products. The value was not disclosed. Estimates ranged from €2 million to €3 million over five years. The company had 250 employees at that stage.

In 2026, Dew Valley now supplies 96 of its restaurants across the Republic of Ireland. The two companies have worked to reduce salt, sugar and saturated fat in the bacon products.

==== Facilities and workforce ====
In March 2016 the company sought permission for an 8,200 m² extension. In 2022 it had over 400 employees.

In 2023–24 the company commissioned a 25-acre solar farm. In November 2024 it applied to Tipperary County Council for an 11,000 m² extension. The plan would raise employment from about 450 to 630. The Irish Independent reported that it could create about 180 jobs.

== Operations ==
=== Cooked bacon ===
The company cures its own streaky bacon. It cooks bacon by a specific microwave-based process. It says it was the first in Europe to do so. Dew Valley is a Gold member of Bord Bia (Irish Food Board) a state agency, through its Origin Green programme, and as such the company was awarded twice in 2025 and 2026 for "sustainability achievements": "Dew Valley is recognised for its innovation, including being the first in Europe to use microwave cooking technology". The site holds ISO 14001 certification. As an unlimited company it files no public accounts.

Its range comprises crispy, medium-cooked and light-cooked streaky bacon, crispy bacon bits and cooked back bacon, sold in Ireland, Great Britain and continental Europe. In 2024 the share of quality-assured meat bought at farm level rose from 89 per cent to 92.9 per cent.

Bacon long resisted commercial precooking: continuous oil fryers left it oil-soaked and twisted, and infrared ovens cooked it unevenly. Microwave cooking of cured, unsmoked pork-belly slices was patented in 1990 as a way to make precooked bacon without a smoking step. In the United States, precooked sliced bacon has been produced predominantly in continuous microwave ovens. Dew Valley's exact methods and processes remain confidential, and protected by patent IES20050058.

=== Powdered flavouring ===
Dew Valley approached Teagasc's Moorepark Technology Ltd to find a use for the bacon fat left over from microwave cooking, and the fat was converted into a powdered smoky bacon flavouring by microencapsulation. The product was placed in the top three in the research award category at Food Ingredients Europe Exhibition in Frankfurt in November 1998. The by-product was a cook-out of about 70 per cent fat and 30 per cent water that the company had been selling cheaply. Modified cream separators removed the water while keeping the smoky flavour, and the fat was homogenised with a milk-protein coating and lactose, then spray-dried into particles about one-fortieth of a millimetre across. The process was developed at Moorepark by Kieran Keogh and Brendan O'Kennedy, and the initial approach from Dew Valley came in July 1997. A 1998 Teagasc project report lists a natural smoky bacon-flavoured ingredient, made from a bacon-processing by-product, among the commercial outcomes of its encapsulated-fat programme. Dew Valley was then close to an agreement with a US ingredients company to market the powder worldwide.

Microencapsulation turns liquid flavours and fats into stable, free-flowing powders. Spray-drying of flavours with gum acacia has been used since the 1930s. Moorepark's programme used sodium caseinate and lactose to make powders containing 70 to 90 per cent fat.
