= Thurles Golf Club =

Irish golf club

Coordinates: 52.6626°N 7.8021°W

Thurles Golf Club has existed since at least 1909, when it affiliated to the Golfing Union. The club's current course is located just to the south of Thurles town in the townland of Turtulla. Its clubhouse is based around Turtulla House, the former manor house of this townland, which, along with 218 acres, were bought for the club in 1944.
