= Limerick School of Art and Design =

Art school of the Technological University of the Shannon

- Scoil Ealaíne Agus Deartha Luimnigh
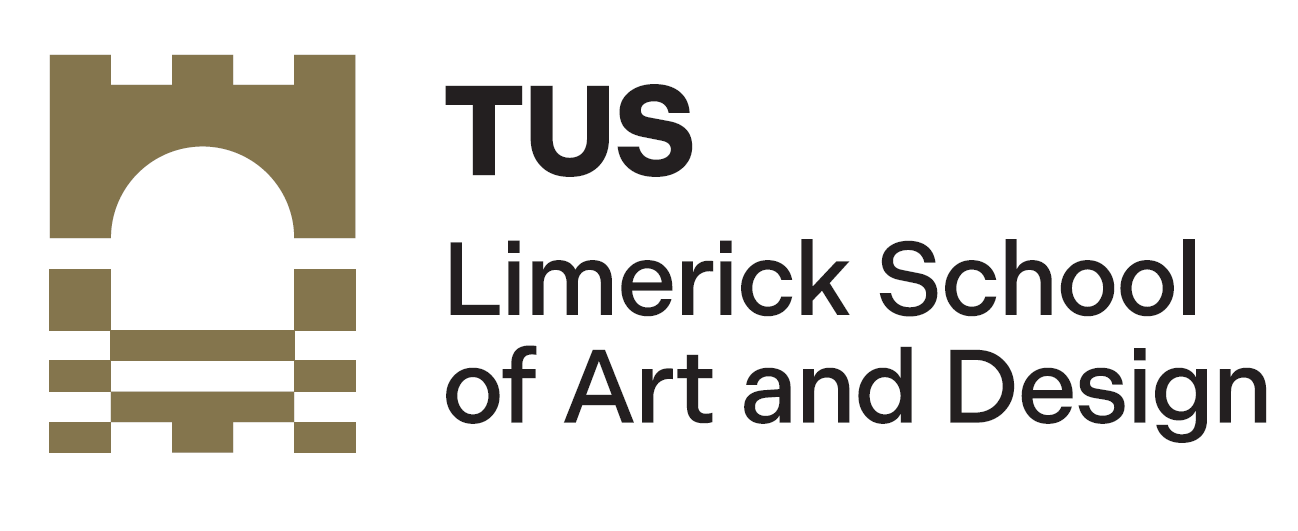
- Logo of the college
- Type: Public art college
- Established: 1852; 174 years ago
- Parent institution: Technological University of the Shannon
- Dean: Professor Anthony Caleshu
- Students: 1,650
- Location: Clare St Limerick, Limerick, Munster, V94 KX22, Ireland
- Colours: Purple and white
- Website: tus.ie/lsad/

The Limerick School of Art and Design (LSAD; Irish: Scoil Ealaíne Agus Deartha Luimnigh) is a constituent art college of the Technological University of the Shannon, located in Limerick, Ireland.

The school operates on four of TUS campuses, Clare Street Campus (including George's Quay) and Moylish Campus in Limerick city, Clonmel Campus Tipperary and Athlone Campus. LSAD has four Departments, Fine Art and Education, Design, Digital Arts and Media and Midlands Media and Design. LSAD offers over 25 programmes at level 8 (BA and BSc honours degree) and level 9 (master's degree) across a range of art, design and media disciplines. LSAD continues to grow its research output with some sixty MA and PhD students currently engaged in a broad range of research projects. The school also engages with national, European and international partners in areas involving education, research and enterprise.

== History ==
The school can trace its origins back to 1852. On 3 July 1852, a public notice appeared in the Limerick Chronicle announcing the opening of the School of Ornamental Art at the Leamy Institute on Hartstonge Street. The school offered instruction to the general public in drawing and modelling. The first prospectus stated the school's objective of "providing instruction in all those branches of art which are applicable to manufactures and decoration". The school opened on 2 November 1852 with 28 male and seven female pupils.

Although the school thrived in its first year, changes in government departments led to a withdrawal of funding and the school was forced to close in January 1855. Following public pressure, the school reopened in December 1855 under the auspices of the Limerick Athenaeum, a centre of learning that would be open to all, irrespective of class, creed or cultural background. This had opened in February 1855 at No. 2 Upper Cecil Street. The school continued to operate successfully over the coming decades. The trustees of the Athenaeum handed the building over to the Corporation in 1896 in order to administer the property for the advancement of technical education in Limerick. However, by the turn of the century, the building was no longer large enough to cater for the range of courses offered by the Limerick Technical Instruction Committee, and the school began to move sections to new premises, mainly on George's Street (now O'Connell Street).

The departments were eventually rehoused on one site with the opening of the Municipal Technical Institute on O' Connell Avenue in December 1911. This building has since been known in Limerick as the 'Red Tech'. The work of the Institute was taking place against the background of intense political change in Ireland and was forced to close from 1919 to 1923. Troops of the Warwickshire Regiment occupied the Institute during the Irish War of Independence in 1921 and considerable damage was caused to the building and its contents. Limerick MTI eventually re-opened in October 1923 and such was the impact of the closure that it was effectively a new start-up.

The Vocational Education Committee was established in July 1930 and took over the running of the MTI, with its main focus on providing full-time education to students between the ages of fourteen and sixteen. This continued in much the same format until 1967, when the Limerick VEC was suspended for three years over irregularities in appointing staff. The School of Art had relocated to the former County Infirmary and Nurses' Home in Mulgrave Street in 1962, now Limerick College of Further Education.

Limerick missed out on a new technical college in 1966 with the establishment of the Regional Technical Colleges, as the Department of Education decided to establish a National Institute for Higher Education instead (later to become the University of Limerick). The reconvened Limerick City VEC planned to build Limerick Technical College and acquired land at Moylish Park to do this. The college was opened in 1975 and has since developed into the main campus of Limerick Institute of Technology.

The School of Art continued to grow at its Mulgrave Street location and by the mid 1970s, the lack of space was becoming a concern. In 1980, the school took shape as what is now the Limerick School of Art and Design under the reconstituted LTC, which had become the College of Art, Commerce and Technology (CoACT), and this coincided with a move to a VEC property on George’s Quay, formerly St. Anne’s Vocational School, which had been opened in 1939 but vacated in 1978. However, the move to George’s Quay proved to be a short-term solution as the school quickly outgrew this site also. CoACT rented rooms in Bruce House on Rutland Street and in the Granary on Michael Street to accommodate the extra courses and students but this quickly got out of control with the school renting a further five properties during this period.

When CoACT finally achieved RTC status in 1992, work began on finding a suitable location for the school. The Good Shepherd Convent on Clare Street was purchased from the Good Shepherd Sisters in October 1994 and some emergency refurbishment allowed occupancy as early as January 1995. Further refurbishment and development work took place and its final stage was completed in September 2008.

== Clare Street Campus ==
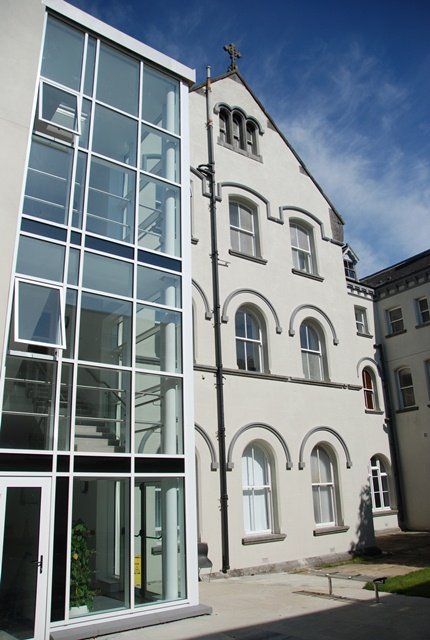
New build alongside 19th century convent

Clare Street originally backed onto the walls of the Irishtown and derives its name from John Fitzgibbon, the 1st Earl of Clare who was Lord Chancellor of Ireland from 1789 to 1802. James O'Sullivan, a tobacco merchant, constructed the street on swampy land known as Múin na Muice, the moor or common of the pigs, and dedicated it to Fitzgibbon.

The Clare Street Campus is located on the site of an old Lancastrian School, developed by Joseph Lancaster for the education of the poor in the early 19th century. Lancaster was a Quaker, born in London in 1788, who had devoted himself to the education of the poor. His system was to employ the more advanced boys as monitors, or assistant teachers, to enable a few masters to teach a large number of boys. Spelling and reading were taught from charts hung on the walls, thereby dispensing with the need for books for the poor and slates were used to write on, to save paper. His first school was founded in London in 1801 and his school in Limerick was probably founded around 1806. The entrance to the school was on Old Clare Street and this street became known locally as The Long Can, after the Lancastrian School.

Attendance figures dropped at the school and it gradually fell into disrepair. In November 1821, The Christian Brothers purchased the school for £200. In 1858, they let part of the garden to Madame De Beligond, superioress of the Good Shepherd Convent at an annual rent of £10. When the Christian Brothers left the building in 1888, they sold it to the nuns for £200. They established a girls' reformatory on the site of the old Thomond Brewery, adjacent to the convent, which was one of three breweries still in operation in Limerick city in the 1870s. It was sold to the nuns in 1879 and demolished to construct the reformatory to house young women who had become pregnant out of wedlock. They also established a Magdalene laundry on another adjacent site which had been a public execution ground in the 16th and 17th centuries, known as the Farrancroghy execution site. They continued to operate the reformatory and the laundry at the site until it was sold to the Regional Technical College in 1994.

Major refurbishment and construction works have been carried out at the site, in two phases. The first saw the refurbishment of much of the main building and chapel in the late 1990s. The second phase was completed in August 2008 and consisted of construction of additional space, further refurbishment and considerable ground works, including a new entrance onto Clare Street.

== Courses ==
LSAD offers a range of art, design, media and education programmes at undergrad, postgrad and by research:

- First Year Art & Design – BA (Hons) https://tus.ie/courses/us800/ Limerick
- Art and Design Teacher Education – BEd (Hons) https://tus.ie/courses/us801/ Limerick
- Game Art and Design – BSc (Hons) https://tus.ie/courses/us806/ Clonmel
- Bachelor of Arts in Fine Art in Painting
- Bachelor of Arts in Fine Art in Printmaking
- Bachelor of Arts in Fine Art in Sculpture & Combined Media
- Bachelor of Arts (Honours) in Fine Art (in Painting, Printmaking, Sculpture & Combined Media)
- Bachelor of Arts in Design in Visual Communications, Bachelor of Arts in Product Design
- Bachelor of Arts in Fashion Design and Bachelor of Arts (Honours) in Graphic Design, Ceramic Design and Fashion Design, Bachelor of Arts (Honours) in Interior Design
- Bachelor of Science in Creative Multimedia
- Bachelor of Science (Honours) in Creative Multimedia
- Bachelor of Science (Honours) in Digital Animation Production
- Bachelor of Science (Honours) in Game Art & Design

== Postgraduate courses ==
- Master of Fine Art (MFA) and MA in Fine Art (MAFA)
- MA in Instructional and Learning Design
- Research in Art, Design and Media -MA PHD

== Accommodation ==
Most students of LSAD reside in nearby student accommodation compounds, Grove Island, Parkville, and Parkview. The closest accommodation to the art college is Grove Island, with Parkview and Parkville student accommodation being the furthest away. Many single apartments are also used in the city centre.

== Notable alumni ==
- David Chambers
- Amanda Coogan
- Diana Copperwhite
- Conor Harrington
- Eddie Kennedy
- Miriam Mone
- Eimer Ní Mhaoldomhnaigh
- Declan Shalvey
- John Shinnors
- Pat Shortt
- Samuel Walsh

== Notable faculty ==
- Anne Seagrave
