= Barbara Warren (artist) =

Irish painter

- Born: 28 August 1925; Dublin, Irish Free State
- Died: 10 May 2017 (aged 91)
- Education: National College of Art and Design; Regent Street Polytechnic
- Known for: oil painting, portrait
- Style: Representational
- Spouse: William Carron
- Children: 1
- Elected: Aosdána (1990)

Barbara Warren RHA (28 August 1925 – 10 May 2017) was an Irish painter. She was a member of Aosdána, an elite Irish association of artists.

== Early life ==
Warren was born in 1925; her father worked in a printers, while her mother was from a County Tipperary Quaker family. She attended the French School in Bray and Alexandra College. In 1943 she moved to Belfast to perform war work, maintaining Lancaster bombers.

== Career ==
Warren studied at the National College of Art and Design (NCAD, Dublin) and at Regent Street Polytechnic (London), and then under André Lhote in Paris. She exhibited widely from 1950, winning a Purser-Griffith travel scholarship in the history of European painting in 1955.

She taught at NCAD between 1973 and 1984. She was elected to the RHA in 1989 and Aosdána in 1990, receiving the James Kennedy Memorial Award for portraiture from the RHA in 1990, and the career achievement prize at the 1999 Florence Biennale.

She worked in still life, interiors, figure studies and landscapes. Her paintings are held by the Office of Public Works, Ulster Museum, Irish Museum of Modern Art, The National Self-Portrait Collection of Ireland and Haverty Trust. According to The Irish Times, "Her thoughtful, considered mode of stylised realism never became formulaic. Each painting was a new puzzle to be approached on its own terms. She was regarded as the last surviving link with a generation of Irish women artists who studied in France and effected a major shift in 20th-century Irish art."

== Personal life ==
Warren married William Carron, another artist, in 1961; they lived in Howth and had one child, Rachael. Barbara Warren died in 2017. She was a friend of the artists Elizabeth Rivers and Kitty Wilmer O'Brien.
