= National College of Art and Design =

Art institution in Dublin, Ireland

Coordinates: 53°20′34″N 6°16′44″W

- Coláiste Náisiúnta Ealaíne is Deartha
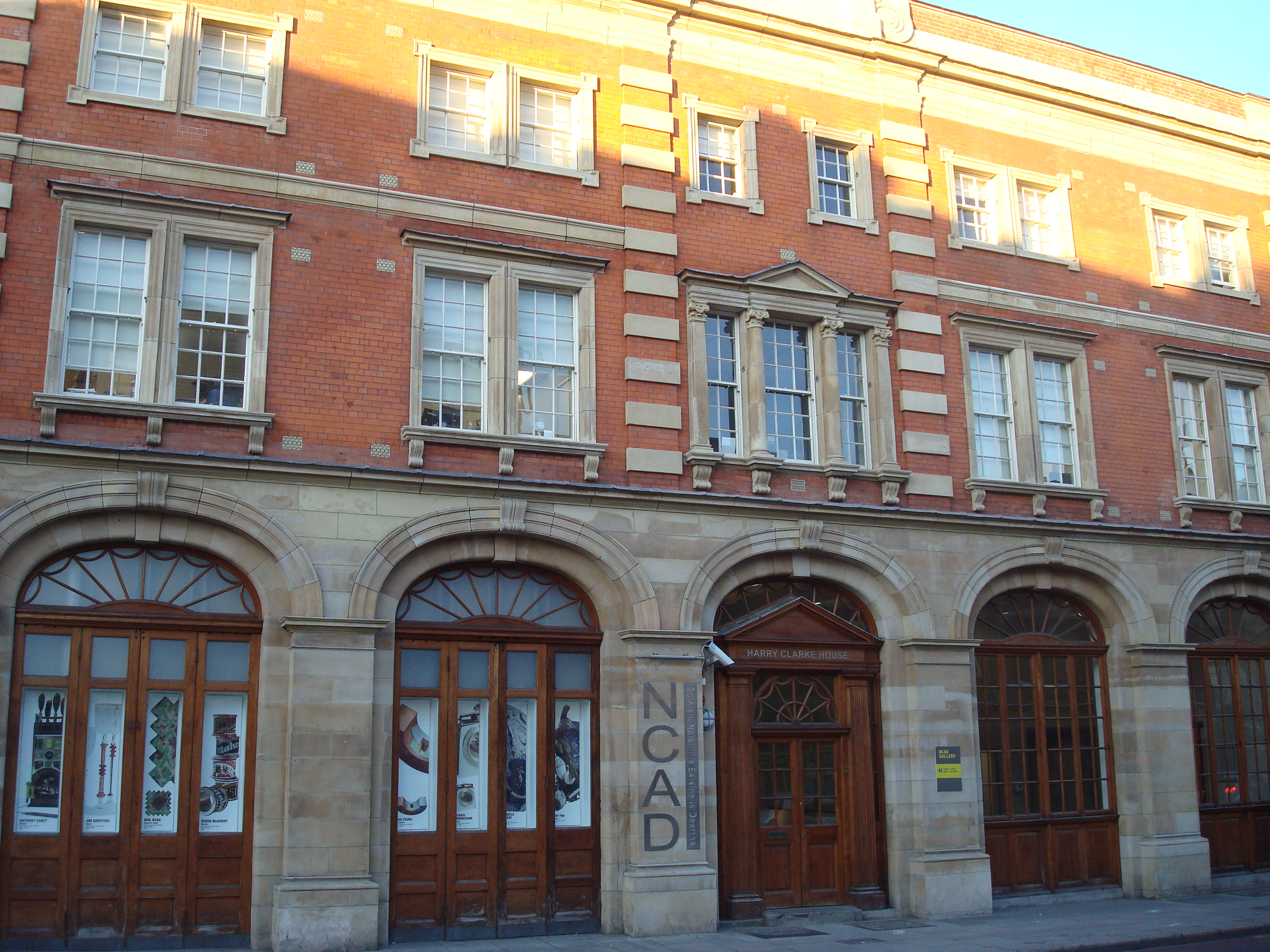
- Former names: National College of Art, Dublin Metropolitan School of Art
- Type: Public
- Established: 1746
- Affiliations: University College Dublin (UCD), 2010–present NUI, 1997–2010
- Students: 950 (full time); 600 (part time)
- Location: Dublin, Ireland
- Website: ncad.ie
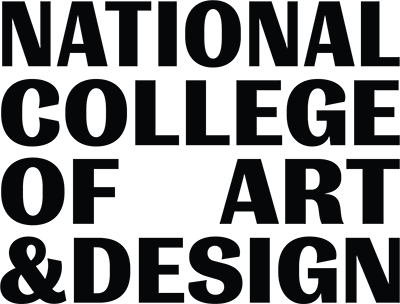

The National College of Art and Design (NCAD) is Ireland's oldest art institution, offering the largest range of art and design degrees at undergraduate and postgraduate level in the country. Originating as a drawing school in 1746, many of the most important Irish artists, designers and art educators have studied or taught in the college. NCAD has always been located in central Dublin, and in 1980 it relocated to the historic Liberties area. The College has around 950 full-time students and a further 600 pursuing part-time courses, and NCAD's students come from more than forty countries. NCAD is a Recognised College of University College Dublin. It is also a member of the European League of Institutes of the Arts.

== History ==
=== Overview ===
The National College of Art and Design can trace its origins in an unbroken line back to the drawing school set up by Robert West in George's Lane, in 1746, and then sponsored by the Dublin Society. The institution has been influenced in turn by the French Enlightenment, the Victorian schools of design, including industrial design, the Arts and Crafts movement, the search for Irish national identity and innovations in British art education in the 1960s. The school has also played a role in Irish social and cultural developments - it had a significant influence on the eighteenth century Irish school of painting and sculpture and it also affected the standard of applied ornament in architecture and crafts. Most Irish artists of importance have spent some time in the college, and in the twentieth century the teaching staff has included Sir William Orpen, Oliver Sheppard, Oswald Reeves, Harry Clarke, Seán Keating, Maurice MacGonigal, Laurence Campbell and Bernardus Romein.

The opening up of Irish culture in the 1960s had a profound effect on the college, resulting in years of student disturbances and closures by the government. Central to this was the debate about Modernism versus traditional discipline and the control exercised by the Department of Education and its predecessors. There was also the pressure for industrial design reform in face of the new economic future of an independent Ireland, and again within the Common Market. The consequence of all this revolution was a statute of 1971 which re-established the college, granting it freedom to run its own affairs academically. The college was further restructured in 1975 and a wide range of degree courses developed.

Following its relocation to Thomas Street in the early 1980s, the college expanded its offer of undergraduate courses and introduced a range of postgraduate courses and research based options up to PhD level.

=== Timeline ===
==== The early years ====
- 1746: The Dublin Society (subsequently the Royal Dublin Society) decided to subsidise Robert West's Drawing School in George's Lane (later Georges Street) by means of student premiums.
- 1750: the Dublin Society set aside rooms for a drawing school at their premises in Shaw's Court off Dame Street - the stables there were converted into drawing schools. West was the Master of the Figure School and James Marrin was the Master of the Landscape and Ornamental School. Later Thomas Ivory was Master of the Architectural School. Throughout the 18th century, the Dublin Parliament gave an annual grant to the Dublin Society, which included support for the school. In fact this was the only state supported school in Great Britain and Ireland. The Society awarded prizes and medals to the best students annually, as well as to the Irish artistic community at large.
- 1767: the Society moved to a new building in Grafton Street, to which the Drawing Schools were moved later from Shaw's Court.
- 1796: The Society and its Schools were established in Hawkins Street.

==== After the Act of Union ====
- 1800: From this year the State subsidy began to come from the United Kingdom parliament at Westminster. This led to a great deal of ongoing friction with the Treasury and other branches of government in London, as the Westminster establishment was much less sympathetic to the Society and its work and sought to centralise direct control from London.
- 1811: A fourth school — in addition to Figure Drawing, Landscape & Ornamental Drawing, and Architectural Drawing — was added: the School of Modelling, to which the eminent Irish sculptor Edward Smyth was appointed as Head. All Schools, with the exception of the School of Modelling, offered only drawing — no painting. The method of teaching was by means of drawing the nude model, the antique, copying prints and drawings. The training in drawing ornamental patterns was a key element, becoming the chief element after 1854.
- 1815: The Society moved to Leinster House on Kildare Street and shortly afterwards converted stables for use as a drawing school. The stables were on a site later used by the National Library.
- 1820: The Dublin Society became the Royal Dublin Society.
- 1827: Permanent drawing schools were built beside Leinster House together with the gallery overhead which was used to exhibit the Society's teaching collection of sculpture and works of art generally. The schools were below, in the basement.

==== London oversight ====
- 1849: The Board of Trade in London took control of the School as a school of design (for industry) and gave it a direct vote of funding, which was managed by the Royal Dublin Society.
- 1854: Control of the School now passed to the newly established Department of Science and Art based in South Kensington, London. The School was made to conform to the new London syllabus emphasising design education. Fine art education in the later 19th century in Ireland was the province of the Royal Hibernian Academy.

==== State institution ====
- 1877: The School was bought out from the Royal Dublin Society by the British Government and becomes the Dublin Metropolitan School of Art, a school wholly centrally supported through the Department of Science and Art, dealing locally with the Director of Science and Art in Dublin, who was also responsible for the Library and Museum and certain other institutions. During the late 19th century design for lace was promoted in the School as well as throughout Ireland.

==== Dublin oversight ====
- 1900: Control passed to the newly established Department of Agriculture and Technical Instruction for Ireland, established by Horace Plunkett and based on Merrion Street, albeit with the funding vote still coming from the Treasury in London. Major reforms were introduced before the Great War, notably the development of craft classes, particularly in stained glass (students included Harry Clarke, Michael Healy and Wilhelmina Geddes), enamels and metalwork, as well as life classes taught by William Orpen.
- 1914: From this date onward the school experienced difficulties in terms of resources, which subsequent political instability only increased.
- 1924: The Department of Education of the independent Irish state took over the control of the Metropolitan School of Art.

==== National College of Art ====
- 1936: The Metropolitan School of Art became the National College of Art, with professorships of Design, Painting, and Sculpture. Weaving and Ceramics departments were subsequently added.
- 1969: After a series of adverse reports asking for reform at the College, a crisis situation developed leading to periodic closures of the School by the Government.

==== National College of Art and Design ====
- 1971: The National College of Art and Design Act was passed by the Oireachtas - it was to be governed by a board (An Bord) appointed by the Minister for Education.
- 1972: May 1 was the establishment day of the National College of Art and Design (Coláiste Náisiúnta Elaíne is Deartha).
- 1974: Jonah Jones was appointed Director.
- 1975: The Faculty structure was adopted: Faculty of Fine Art (with departments of Painting, Printmaking, Sculpture); Faculty of Design (with departments of Craft, Fashion and Textiles, Industrial Design, Visual Communications); Faculty of History of Art and Design and Complementary Studies; Faculty of Education and Extra Mural Studies; Department of Pre-Diploma Studies (First year common course).
- 1976: NCAD received designation under the Higher Education Authority.

==== Thomas Street ====
- 1980: Noel Sheridan was appointed Director. Purchase of Powers Distillery premises at Thomas Street. Department of Visual Communication moved into the new buildings, with other departments moving to the campus over subsequent years. Degrees awarded for the first time.
- 1984: Degree courses in Visual Communication and Industrial Design validated by the National Council for Education Awards with the designation Bachelor of Design (B Des).
- 1985: Degree courses in Fine Art, and in History of Art with Fine Art validated by the NCEA with the designation of BA.
- 1988: First MA Degree awarded. First Honorary ANCAD awarded.
- 1989: Noel Sheridan took a sabbatical to work in Australia, and for stability, a full Director was appointed, Professor John Turpin.
- 1994: Noel Sheridan returned as Director.
- 1995: December: Commencement of celebrations to mark NCAD's 250th anniversary, with an ecumenical service in Christ Church Cathedral attended by President Mary Robinson.
- 1996: NCAD 250 celebrations continued with the publication of Professor John Turpin’s History of the College and exhibitions of graduate work at a variety of city venues including the RHA Gallagher Gallery. The College became a Recognised College of the National University of Ireland.
- 1998: The College vacated the Leinster Lane premises, which it had occupied since 1827, and acquired the old Thomas Street Fire Station, renamed Harry Clarke House and now with lecturing and staff facilities. The new School of Design for Industry was completed and ready (dedicated Design For Industry Building commissioned). The College awarded its first PhD.

==== NUI College ====
- 1999: First intake of students under the NUI validation of courses.
- 2000: Formal signing ceremony of the College’s association with the National University of Ireland in January 2000 attended by An Taoiseach, Mr Bertie Ahern, T.D., the Chancellor of the National University of Ireland, Dr Garret FitzGerald, members of the NUI Senate, the Department of Education and Science, Higher Education Authority and National Council for Educational Awards.
- 2001: New courses approved by the NUI: NUI Certificate in Drawing and Visual Investigation; NUI Higher Diploma in Community Arts Education; NUI Diploma in Art Teaching; MA in History of Art and Applied Arts; MA in Virtual Realities.
- 2006: Three taught Masters introduced: MA Design History and Material Culture; MA Art in the Digital World; MA Art in the Contemporary World.
- 2009: An Bord endorsed the academic council’s decision to move to a 3-year undergraduate degree structure with a progression of continuation to a two-year master's and beyond, a further three-year doctoral/PhD process.
- 2009: Opening of NCAD Gallery (with staff room and studio space overhead).
- 2010: NCAD entered into dialogue with both TCD and UCD regarding validation of the college’s awards, and on critical connections that could be developed between each of the institutions. In June 2010 An Bord took the strategic decision to pursue discussions only with UCD with a view to forming a strategic alliance with that university.

==== UCD College ====
- 2011: NCAD changed from being a Recognised College of NUI to being a Recognised College of UCD, and NCAD degrees are since then validated by UCD.
- 2015: The Director of the college, Declan McGonagle, resigned after "intense pressure from students, alumni and staff over controversial college practices."
- 2018: January: Sarah Glennie, former director of IMMA, assumed the Directorship of NCAD

== Campus ==
For most of its history NCAD was located in Kildare Street, in a series of buildings adjoining the Dáil (Parliament) and the National Library of Ireland. With increasing student numbers and a requirement for additional space by the Dail, the College relocated to the Liberties in the early 1980s, to a site at 100 Thomas Street which was formerly the home of Power's Whiskey Distillery.

The six-acre campus is located next door to the landmark Church of St Augustine and St John, by Gothic revivalist Edward Welby Pugin (begun 1862) which features stained glass by NCAD graduates, Michael Healy and Harry Clarke (and his studio).

The campus comprises a mixture of 19th, 20th and 21st century buildings. The largest of the original Powers Distillery buildings is the five-storey Granary, crowned by a cupola with weather vane bearing the date 1817. Other original buildings utilised by the college include the Counting House and Offices (now housing College Administration), designed by C. W. Caroe (c.1876), the Clock Building, and the Distiller's Residence. Distinguishing features associated with the manufacture of whiskey include three of the original giant pot stills, once enclosed but now located on the periphery of Red Square (part of the original kiln building is now integrated into the Library annex), along with two of the original five engine houses, including the most notable, Engine House No. 5 with its 250 horse power beam engine, and the smaller of the original two chimney stacks. The majority of full-time students have dedicated studio space in either the Granary or in the Design For Industry Building (built 1998). The student café, which was originally Power's staff canteen, is located in the vaulted basement of the Counting House and Offices.

In the 1998 the College acquired the old Thomas Street Fire Station, Dublin's first motorised fire station, which was designed by Charles J. McCarthy (1911). Renamed Harry Clarke House, it now houses a lecture theatre, seminar rooms and staff offices. Between it and the Counting House is the modernist NCAD Gallery (with staff room and studio space overhead) which was designed by Murray Ó Laoire Architects and opened in 2009.

Since 2017 the College campus has featured in Dubline (Dublin Discovery Trail), the self-guided tour which introduces visitors to both the contemporary college and the history of the site and the buildings.

== Notable facilities on campus ==
- The Edward Murphy Library, located in The Granary, is named after the College's long-serving Head Librarian and founder of NIVAL; it has an extensive collection of material relating to 19th, 20th and 21st century art, design and visual culture, and holds almost 100,000 books.
- NIVAL (National Irish Visual Arts Library) is located in the Clock Building on the campus and is a public research resource dedicated to the documentation of twentieth and twenty-first century Irish visual art and design. It collects, stores and makes accessible for research an unparalleled collection of documentation about Irish art and design in all media.
- The NCAD Gallery is a modernist exhibition space which has an ongoing programme of exhibitions by national and international artists as well as shorter displays of work by current students.
- Distillers Press is NCAD's typography and Letterpress printing workshop, located in the Department of Communications Design. The focus of the Press is on education and experimentation in typography and relief-based image making. The press holds a significant collection of printing equipment and wooden and metal type from the 19th, 20th and 21st centuries.
- Origin8 is a centre for commercialisation and innovation, where campus spin-outs work to establish their business and design researchers collaborate with companies across a range of industries.

== Academic structure ==
NCAD consists of four schools: Design, Fine Art, Visual Culture and Education which provide a range of undergraduate and postgraduate degree courses, and research-based study up to PhD level.

=== Undergraduate ===
In the Schools of Fine Art, Design, and Education, students enter a common First Year to undertake a three-year BA (Honours) degree which includes an inter-disciplinary first semester. BA Degree specialisms are available in Ceramics & Glass, Fashion Design, Graphic Design, Illustration, Interaction Design, Jewellery & Objects, Media, Print, Product Design, Sculpture & Expanded Practice, Textile Art & Artefact, and Textile & Surface Design. Additionally, in conjunction with School of Education, students may avail of a four-year Joint Honours BA Degree (to qualify to teach at second level) in combination with any of the College's specialisms. Visual Culture is a component of all degree courses and the School of Visual Culture also offers a single (non studio-based) three year Degree pathway. There is also a Visual Culture Joint Honours option in combination with any of the College's specialisms. From the academic year 2018/19 NCAD has stated its intention to introduce Studio+ which will allow all Fine Art and Design students to take an extended four year degree which will provide options to study abroad through the Erasmus programme or to gain practical work experience in the form of industry placement on live commercial, social, or community projects in Ireland or abroad. Students will be awarded a BA in Design or Fine Art or a BA International.

=== Postgraduate ===
NCAD offers the widest range of specialist and interdisciplinary art and design Masters programmes in Ireland: MA Interaction Design; MSc Medical Device Design; MFA Design; MFA Fine Art; MA/MFA Art in the Contemporary World; MA Design History and Material Culture; Professional Master in Education (Art & Design); MA Socially Engaged Art and Further Education;

=== Continuing Education in Art and Design ===
CEAD offers part-time accredited (within the National Framework of Qualifications) courses and also non-credit art and design courses over a range of more than fifty options. The CEAD student body is over 500.

== Notable alumni ==
- Gordon Brewster
- Jennifer Buckley
- Gerard Byrne
- James Rawson Carroll
- Harry Clarke
- Eamon Colman
- Diana Copperwhite
- Phoebe Donovan
- Beatrice Elvery
- Genieve Figgis
- Catherine E. Greene
- Hugh Douglas Hamilton
- Elayne Harrington
- Rose Kavanagh
- Sean Keating
- Orla Kiely
- Brian King
- Richard King
- Dónal Lunny
- Flora Mitchell
- Evin Nolan
- Mairead O'hEocha
- Alanna O'Kelly
- Geraldine O'Reilly
- Róisín Madigan O'Reilly
- William Orpen
- Grace Plunkett
- James Joseph Power
- R.H. Quaytman
- Nano Reid
- Simone Rocha
- George William Russell
- Anne Seagrave
- Lydia Shackleton
- Eileen Shields
- Estella Solomons
- Stella Steyn
- Ciaran Sweeney
- Patrick Swift
- Philip Treacy
- Henry Tresham
- Barbara Warren
- William Butler Yeats
- Pauline Bewick

== See also ==
- List of universities in the Republic of Ireland
