= Turtulla, Thurles =

Townland in County Tipperary, Ireland

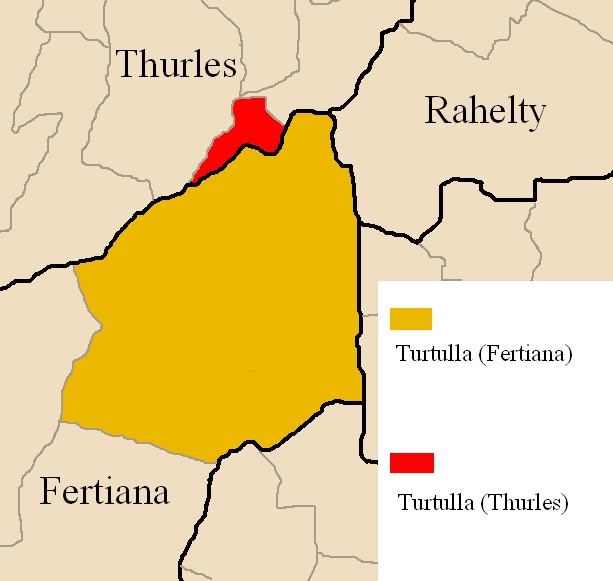
Turtulla townland in Thurles civil parish (red) contrasted with the townland of the same name in Fertiana civil parish

Turtulla is a townland in the civil parish of Thurles, County Tipperary. It is a little over 34 acres in extent. Just across the river, there is another, much larger, townland of the same name which belongs to Fertiana civil parish.

Turtulla (Thurles) contains an island in the River Suir, at the northern end of which there used to be a flour mill.
