= Thurles =

Town in County Tipperary, Ireland

Thurles Durlas Éile (Irish)
- Town
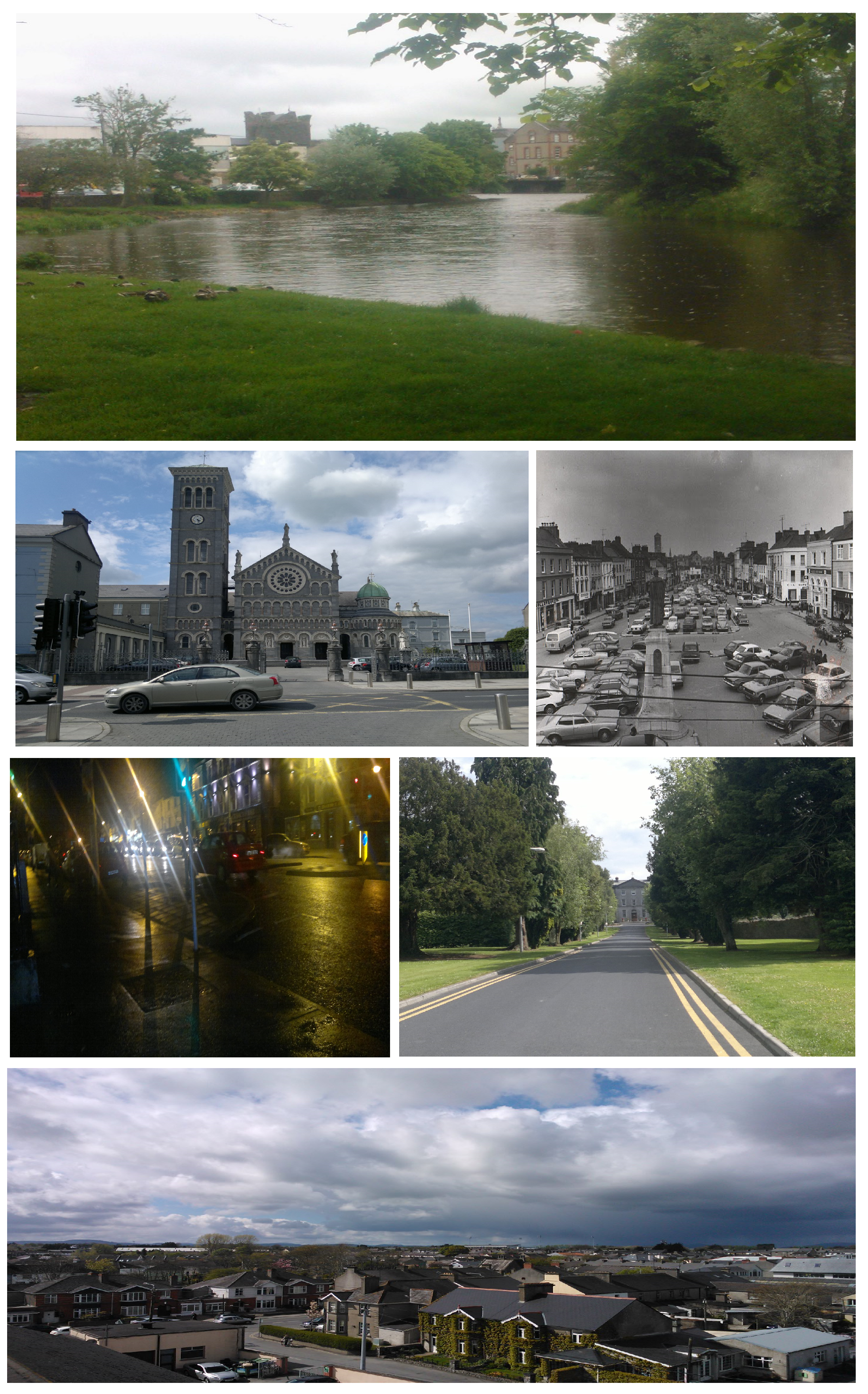
- Clockwise from top: Mall River Walk; Cathedral of the Assumption; Liberty Square c. 1983; Liberty Square at night; St. Patrick's College; northwest view of the town

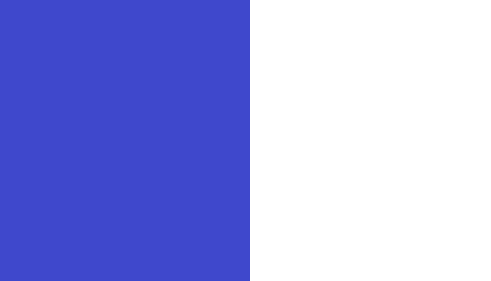
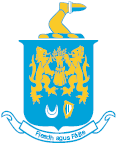
- Flag Coat of arms
- Motto: Irish: Fleadh agus Fáilte (Festival and Welcome)
- Location within Ireland
- Coordinates: 52.679°N 7.814°W
- Country: Ireland
- Province: Munster
- County: County Tipperary
- Barony: Eliogarty
- Elevation: 99 m (325 ft)

Population (2022)
  - Total: 8,185
- Eircode: E41
- Telephone area code: 0504
- Website: www.thurles.ie

Historical population
Year	Pop.	±%
1821	6,040	—
1831	7,084	+17.3%
1841	7,523	+6.2%
1851	5,985	−20.4%
1861	4,866	−18.7%
1871	5,008	+2.9%
1881	4,850	−3.2%
1891	4,511	−7.0%
1901	4,411	−2.2%
1911	4,549	+3.1%
1926	4,815	+5.8%
1936	5,648	+17.3%
1946	6,011	+6.4%
1951	6,276	+4.4%
1956	6,573	+4.7%
1961	6,642	+1.0%
1966	6,949	+4.6%
1971	7,087	+2.0%
1981	7,644	+7.9%
1986	7,338	−4.0%
1991	6,955	−5.2%
1996	6,939	−0.2%
2002	7,425	+7.0%
2006	7,682	+3.5%
2011	7,933	+3.3%
2016	7,940	+0.1%
2022	8,185	+3.1%

Thurles (/ˈtɜːrləs/; Durlas Éile) is a town in County Tipperary, Ireland. It is located in the civil parish of the same name in the barony of Eliogarty and in the ecclesiastical parish of Thurles. The cathedral church of the Roman Catholic Archdiocese of Cashel and Emly is located in the town.

The birthplace of the Gaelic Athletic Association (GAA), Thurles is the third largest town in the county, with a population of 8,185 at the 2022 census.

== Location and access ==
Thurles is located in mid-County Tipperary and is surrounded by the Silvermine Mountains (to the northwest) and the Slieveardagh Hills (to the southeast). The town itself is built on a crossing of the River Suir.

The M8 motorway connects Thurles to Cork and Dublin via the N75 and N62 roads. The N62 also connects Thurles to the centre of Ireland (Athlone) via Templemore and Roscrea. The R498 road links Thurles to Nenagh. Thurles railway station opened on 13 March 1848 and has connections to Cork, Dublin, Limerick and Tralee.

== History ==
=== Ancient history ===
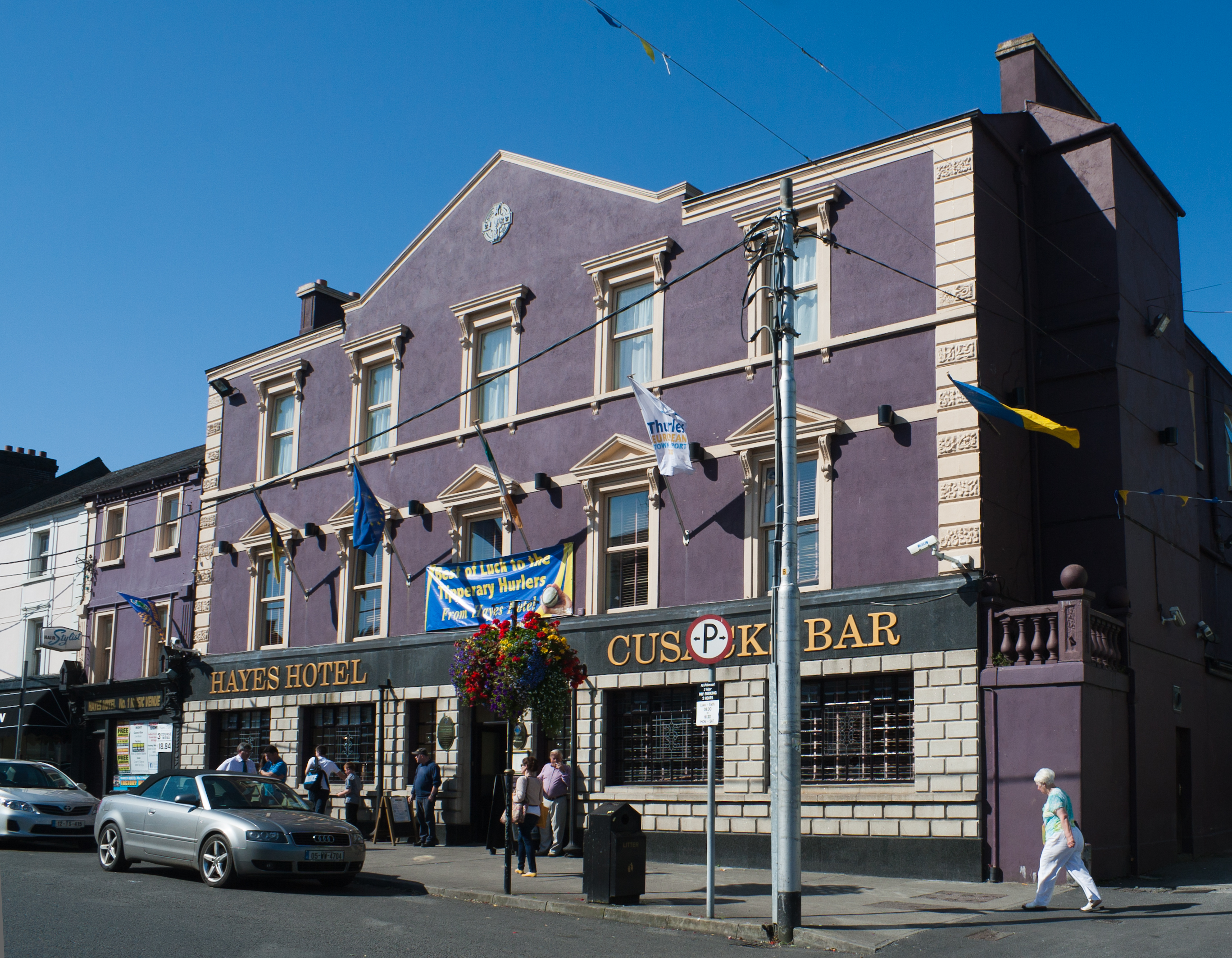
The historic Hayes' Hotel in Liberty Square

The ancient territory of Éile obtained its name from pre-historic inhabitants called the Eli, about whom little is known beyond what may be gathered from legends and traditions. The extent of Éile varied throughout the centuries with the rise and fall of the tribes in occupation. Before the 5th century A.D. the details of its history which can be gleaned from surviving records and literature are exceedingly meagre, obscure and confusing. During this century however Éile appears to have reached its greatest extent, stretching from Croghan Bri Eli (Croghan Hill in Offaly) to just south of Cashel (in Corca Eathrach Eli). The southern part of this territory embraced the baronies of Eliogarty and Ikerrin, a great part of Middle Third, the territory of Ileagh and a portion of the barony of Kilnamanagh Upper.

By the 8th century, the territory of ancient Éile had broken up into a number of petty kingdoms: the O'Carroll occupied the northern portion, the O'Spillanes held Ileagh, the Eóganacht Chaisil had annexed Middle Third while the O'Fogartys held what is now the barony of Eliogarty. The O'Fogarty's gave their name to the town. In Irish, Durlas Éile means "Strong Fort of Éile", or more correctly Durlas Éile Uí Fhogartaigh ("Strong Fort of the O'Fogarty's of Éile"). The clan dominated the regions of Templemore and the Devil's Bit stretching as far as the Tipperary/Kilkenny border.

=== Feudal period ===
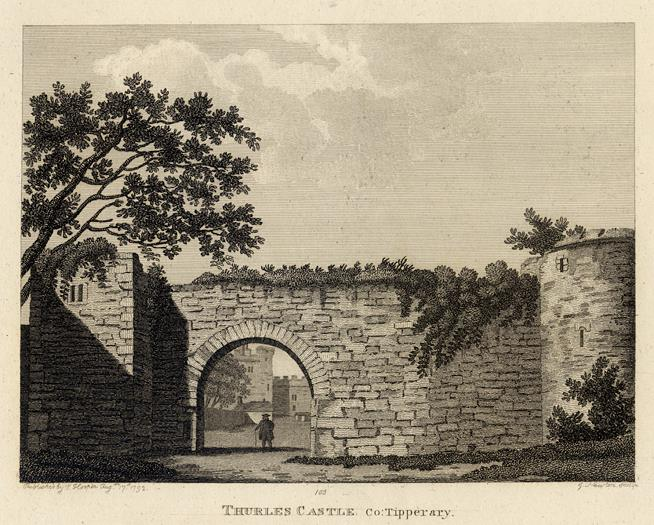
Thurles Castle, 1786 engraving

Towards the end of the 12th century the power of the O'Donoghue clan began to wane, and by the early part of the 13th century, the Norman Butler dynasty came to be the most powerful. It is to the Butlers that Thurles owes much of its early development. Their architectural legacy may be seen today with two of the original family fortresses still standing (the Black Castle near the centre and O'Fogarty Castle by the Suir). Theobald Walter, 1st Baron Butler (Theobald Butler) was the ancestor of the Irish branch of the Butler dynasty. His father had been the hereditary holder of the office of Chief Butler of England and when Theobald assisted Kings Henry II of England and John of England in their invasions of Ireland, he was named "Chief Butler of Ireland". He was also granted a large section of the northeastern part of the kingdom of Limerick. Later in 1328, his descendant, James Butler, was created Earl of Ormond by King Edward III of England.

Market day (August 1848)

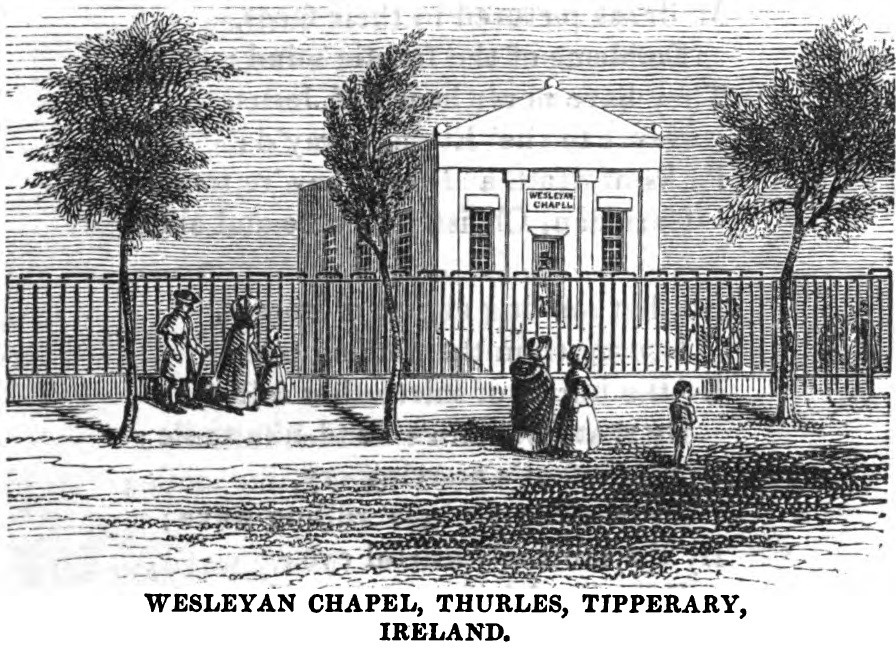
Wesleyan Chapel, Thurles, Tipperary, Ireland (p.9, 1849)

== Commerce ==
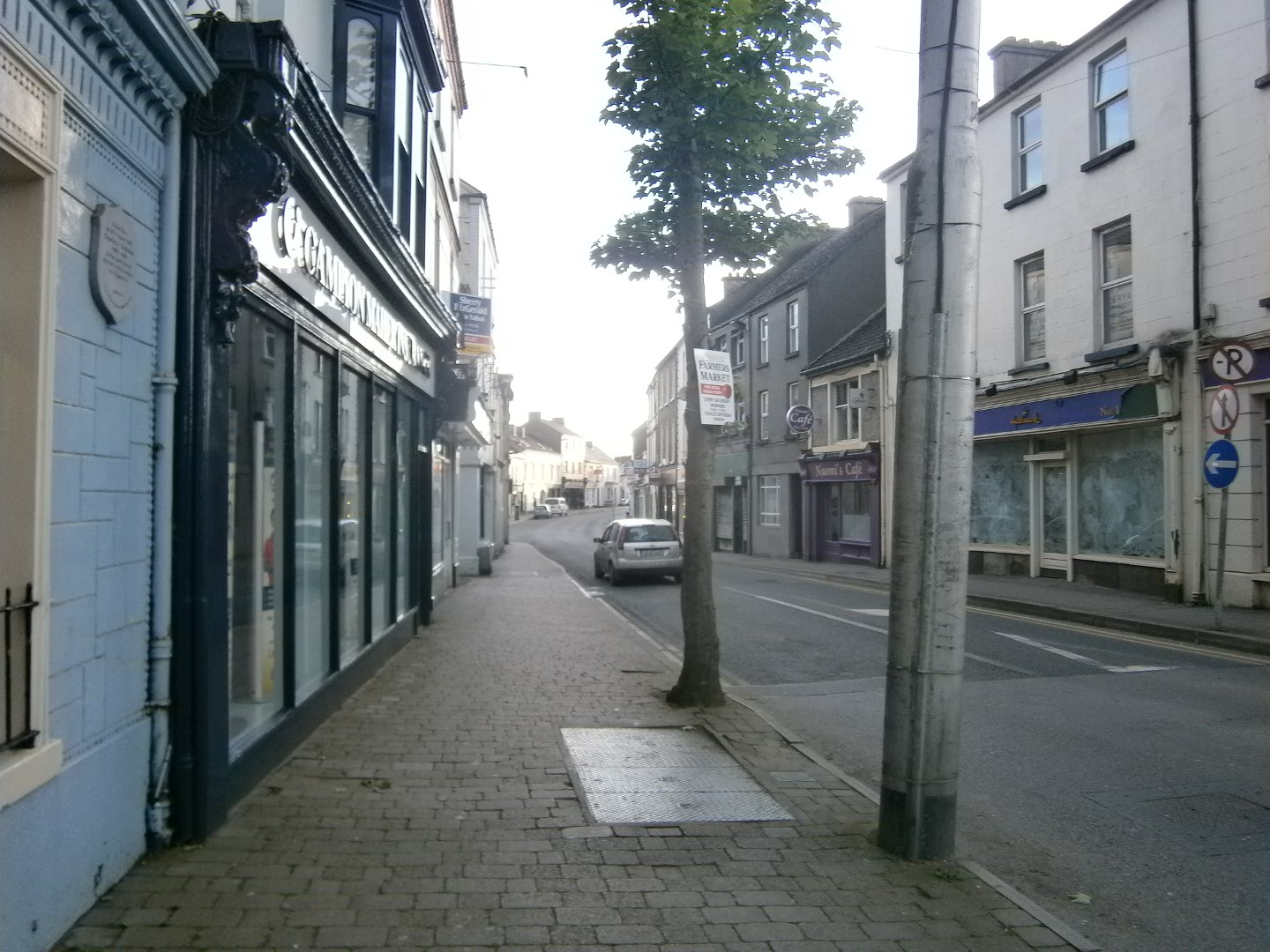
West Gate Street Thurles Co Tipperary

Thurles was originally an agricultural market town. It is now a retail town, with chain stores like Dunnes Stores, Supervalu, Lidl, Aldi, Boots, Tesco and Holland and Barrett established in the town. The headquarters of the meat processing factory Dew Valley Foods is also located in the Thurles environs. Stakelum's Hardware on the Nenagh road, is one of the biggest family owned business in the town. High technology industries have been established in the Thurles Technology Park.

=== Jobs ===
Is the home of food company Erin gravy, sauce, soup and vegetable maker.

== Music and arts ==
=== The Source Arts Centre ===
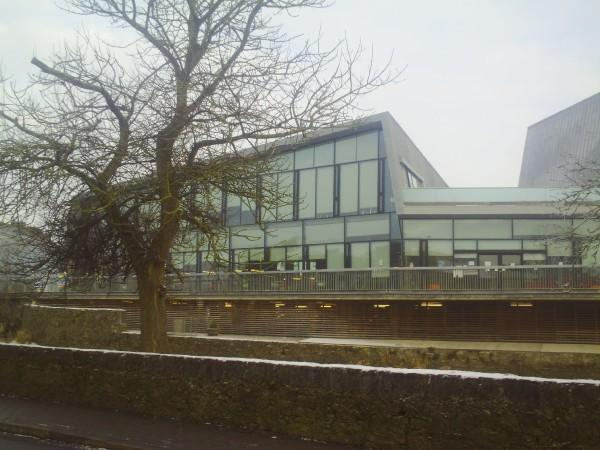
Source Arts Centre and Library

The Source Arts Centre opened on 2 October 2006 and has become the biggest music, theatre and arts venue in north Tipperary. It consists of a 250-seat auditorium with fully flexible seating, and a dedicated gallery space. The year-round programme of events includes film, theatre, dance, ballet, opera, music, family events and visual art exhibitions. Acts like Aslan, Foster and Allen, The Fureys are among the list to have played there.

=== Féile festival ===
The Féile Festival, which ran from 1990 to 1997, was held in Semple Stadium. At the height of its success, an estimated 100,000 people attended the festival, which was also known as "The Trip to Tipp". Acts that played included The Prodigy, The Cranberries, Blur, Bryan Adams, Van Morrison, Rage Against the Machine, The Beautiful South and Deacon Blue.

The festival was revived in 2019 with Sinéad O'Connor among others playing.

=== Thurles Arts Festival ===
Thurles Arts Festival started in 2009, organised by local councillor Jim Ryan. Today it continues at Halloween of each year.

== Amenities and features ==
=== Semple Stadium ===
Thurles is the birthplace of the Gaelic Athletic Association (GAA), founded in 1884 in Hayes' Hotel. Semple Stadium is the second largest GAA stadium in Ireland with a capacity of 53,500, second only to Croke Park in Dublin. The stadium is the "spiritual home" of Munster hurling and many famous matches, especially Munster Finals, have been played there. In 1984, it hosted the All-Ireland Hurling Final to celebrate 100 years since the founding of the GAA in Thurles.

=== Thurles Cathedral ===
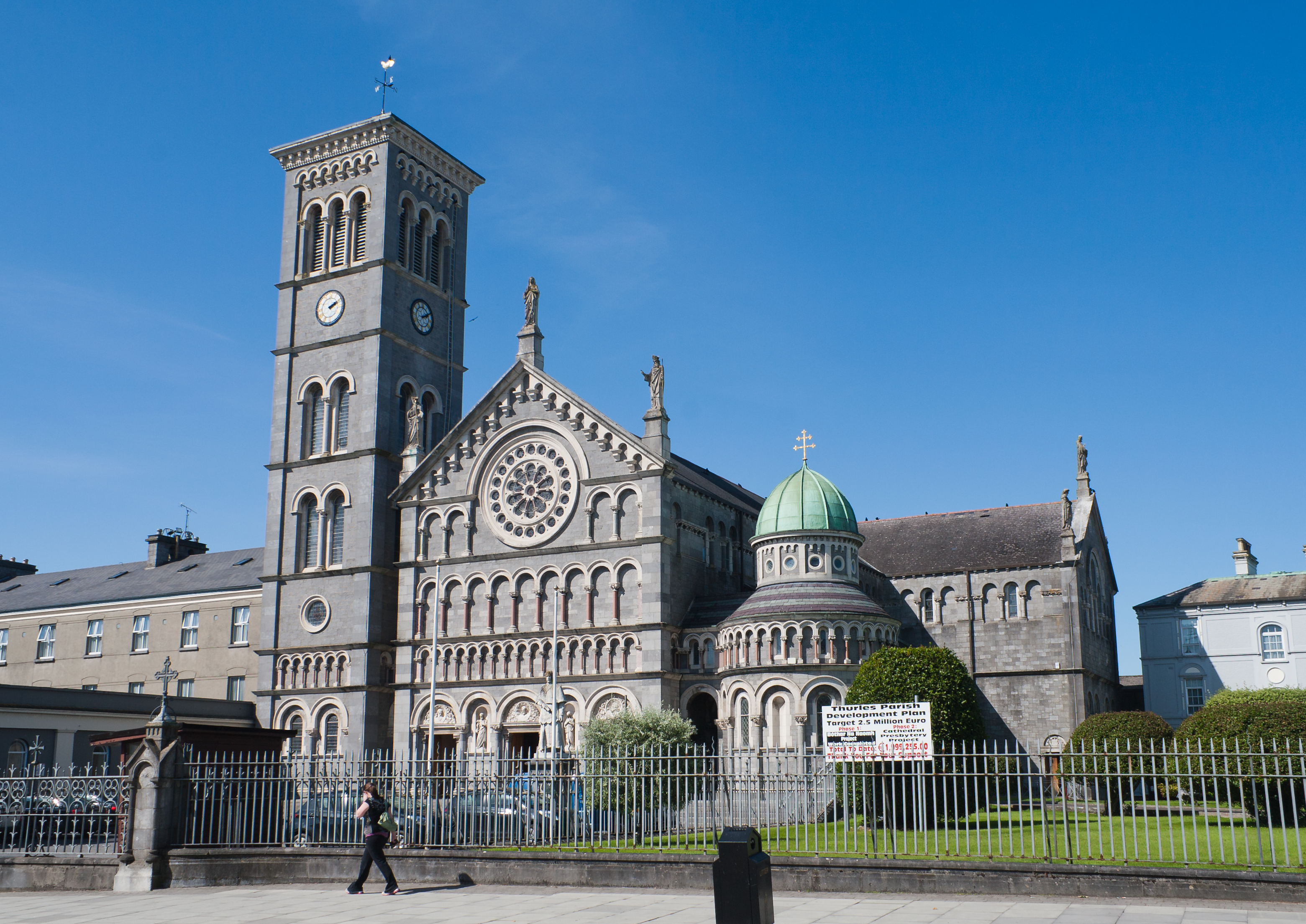
The Cathedral of the Assumption

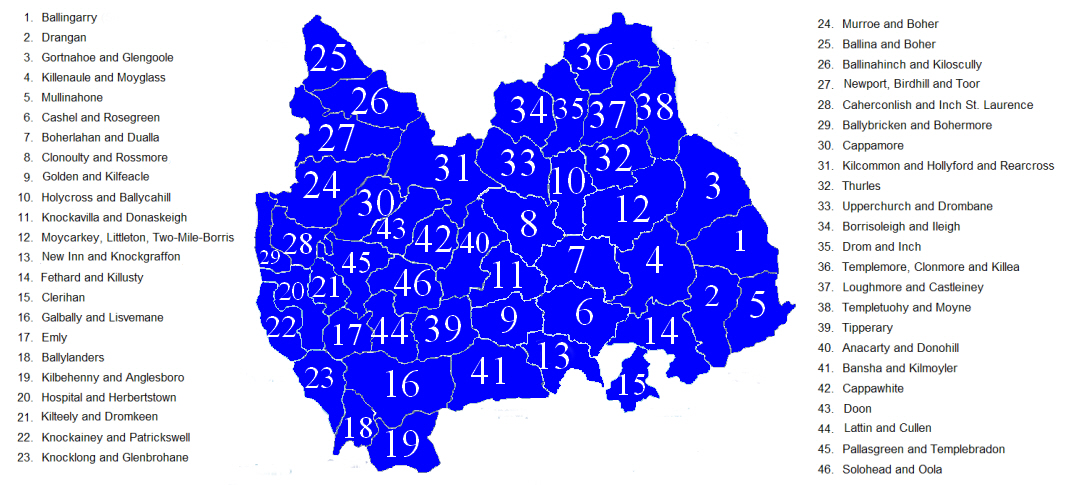
The parish, numbered 32, within the Archdiocese

The Cathedral of the Assumption is the mother church of the ecclesiastical province of Cashel and the cathedral church of the Roman Catholic Archdiocese of Cashel and Emly. It is not in its original site of the Rock of Cashel. This is due to the assumption of certain ecclesiastical properties by the established Church of Ireland at the time of the English Reformation. Instead, following the relaxation of the Penal Laws, the Roman Catholic archbishop chose to locate his cathedra and residence in nearby Thurles. The present Cathedral of the Assumption stands on the site of earlier chapels in the centre of the town. Work on the cathedral, with its Romanesque architectural style and its facade modelled on that of Pisa, commenced in 1865. It was consecrated by Archbishop Thomas Croke on 21 June 1879. The architect was J.J. McCarthy while Barry McMullen was the main builder. Mr. J.C Ashlin was responsible for the enclosing walls, railing and much of the finished work. The cathedral's main features include a rose window, a free-standing baptistery and a magnificent altar. Particularly noteworthy is the tabernacle, the work of Giacomo della Porta, who was a pupil of Michelangelo.

The cathedral was extensively renovated and the sanctuary sympathetically remodelled on the occasion of its centenary in 1979.

=== Famine museum ===
St. Mary's church, belonging to the Church of Ireland, is built on the site of another pre-reformation church in Thurles. This structure was built by the Normans in the 12th century to provide them with a separate and more exclusive place of worship. The building is currently occupied and has a famine museum as well as a war museum. The Famine Museum is now closed.

=== Library ===
Thurles Library is located in the arts centre.

=== Thurles Leisure Centre ===
In 2003, the county council demolished the old swimming pool with plans to build a new pool which were later scrapped. In 2007, a new swimming pool and gym was opened.

== Sport ==
=== Gaelic games ===
Thurles Sarsfields and Thurles Gaels are local Gaelic Athletic Association clubs. The latter is an amalgamation of three longstanding clubs, Thurles Kickhams, Rahealty and Thurles Fennellys and have their pitch in Kickham Park on the Mill Road in Thurles.

=== Association football ===
There are a number of association football (soccer) clubs in the area. These include Peake Villa (founded 1967 and playing in Tower Grounds) and Borroway Rovers (restarted 2002 and playing at Loughtagalla Park). Previous clubs included Thurles Town F.C. (playing in the Greyhound Stadium), Thurles Celtic (founded 2007, also Loughtagalla Park), and Suirside Wanderers (founded 2009 playing in the Vocational School grounds).

=== Horse racing ===
Thurles Racecourse is the main horse racing venue in the town and stages both National Hunt and flat racing. Racing has taken place at Thurles since 1732 when a three-day festival took place at the venue. The course is located 1.5 km west of the town centre. The course is an oval right-handed track of one and a quarter miles with 6 flights of hurdles and 7 steeplechase fences in each circuit. It is one mile, two furlongs long with a steep uphill finish.

=== Other sports ===
The local rugby club, Thurles Rugby Club, was founded in 1924 and is located close to the water tower. Thurles Cricket Club was founded in 2010. The local athletics club, Thurles Crokes Athletic Club, was founded in 1965.

== Education ==
=== Primary ===
Primary schools serving the area include Gaelscoil Bhríde, Scoil Ailbhe CBS, Scoil Angela (Ursuline Convent) and Scoil Mhuire na Toirbhirte (Presentation Convent).

=== Secondary ===
Secondary schools include Thurles CBS, Coláiste Mhuire co-educational school, Presentation Convent and the Ursuline Convent.

=== Third-level and adult education ===
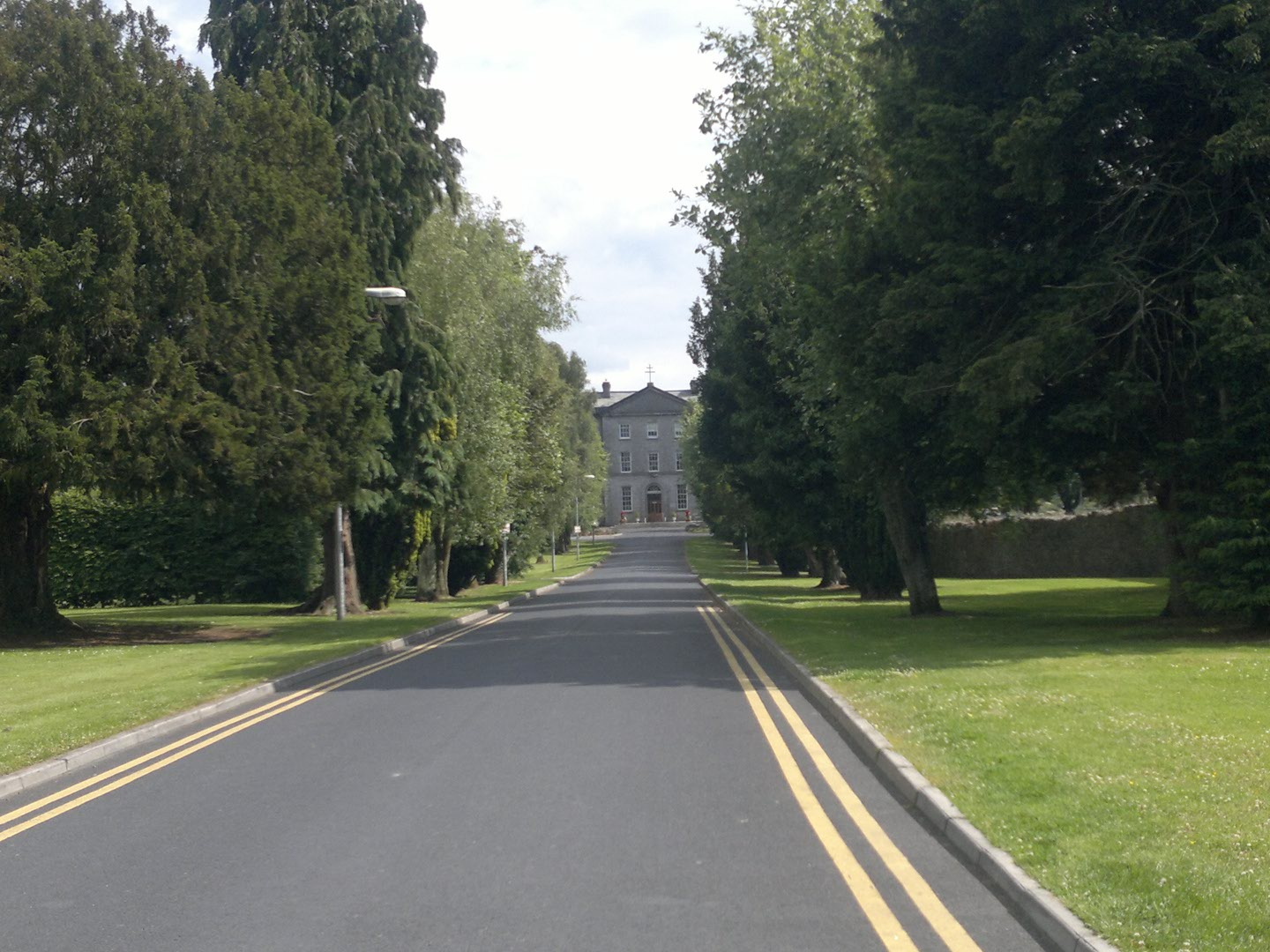
MIC St. Patrick's Campus, Thurles

MIC St. Patrick's Campus, a former seminary runs teacher training degree courses. From 2011 to 2015 on its degrees were awarded by the University of Limerick. It is now part of Mary Immaculate College offering full-time courses in Irish, Religion, Business Studies, Accounting, Maths and Home Economics.

A third-level college, the LIT Tipperary (formerly Tipperary Institute or TRBDI and later renamed Limerick Institute of Technology Tipperary), was established in 1998.

The Pallotine College in Thurles is a retreat, vocations and missions centre for the order.

Other third-level and further education schools include Colaiste Eile, Colaiste Mhuire Adult Education and Thurles Community Training Centre.

== Notable people ==
- William Bradshaw (1830–1861), Victoria Cross recipient
- Greg Broderick, Olympian equestrian
- Séamus Callanan, hurler
- Kerry Condon, actress
- Lar Corbett, hurler
- John Cunningham (1890–1917), Victoria Cross recipient
- Jimmy Doyle, hurler
- Des Hanafin, politician
- Mary Hanafin, politician
- Una Healy, singer of the girl group The Saturdays
- Eddie Kennedy, painter
- Patrick Leahy, bishop
- Fergus O'Dowd, politician
- Niall O'Dowd, journalist
- Dennis O'Driscoll (1954–2012), poet, essayist
- Peter O'Meara, actor and singer
- Paddy Ryan, world heavyweight champion boxer
- Patrick John Ryan, Archbishop
- Tony Ryan, founder of Ryanair
- Pat Shortt, actor and comedian
- Mary Turner, President of the GMB, (1997–2017)

== International relations ==
Thurles is twinned with:

- Bollington, Cheshire East, England, United Kingdom
- Salt Lake City, Utah, United States

== Annalistic references ==
From the Annals of the Four Masters:

- M894.6 - Gairbhith, son of Muireagan, lord of Dearlas, died.
- M931.9 - A battle was gained in Magh-Uatha by Fearghal, son of Domhnall; and Sichfraidh, son of Uathmharan, i.e. the son of the daughter of Domhnall, over Muircheartach, son of Niall, where were slain Maelgarbh, son of Gairbhith, lord of Dearlas; and Conmhal, son of Bruadhran; and many others along with them.
- M934.3 - Bec, son of Gairbhith, lord of Dearlass, died.
- M962.9 - Furadhran, son of Bece, lord of Dearlas, was slain by the Cinel-Eoghain.
- M983.8 - Dubhdarach, son of Domhnallan, lord of Dearlus, was slain.
- M999.4 - Ua Domhnall, i.e. Cuchaill, lord of Durlas, was slain by Ua Neill, i.e. by Aedh.

== See also ==
- List of civil parishes of Tipperary
