= Thurles (civil parish) =

Civil parish in County Tipperary, Ireland

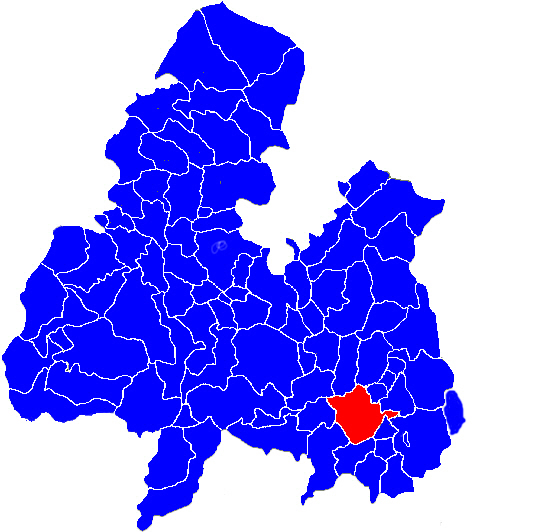
Location of Thurles in the civil parishes of North Tipperary

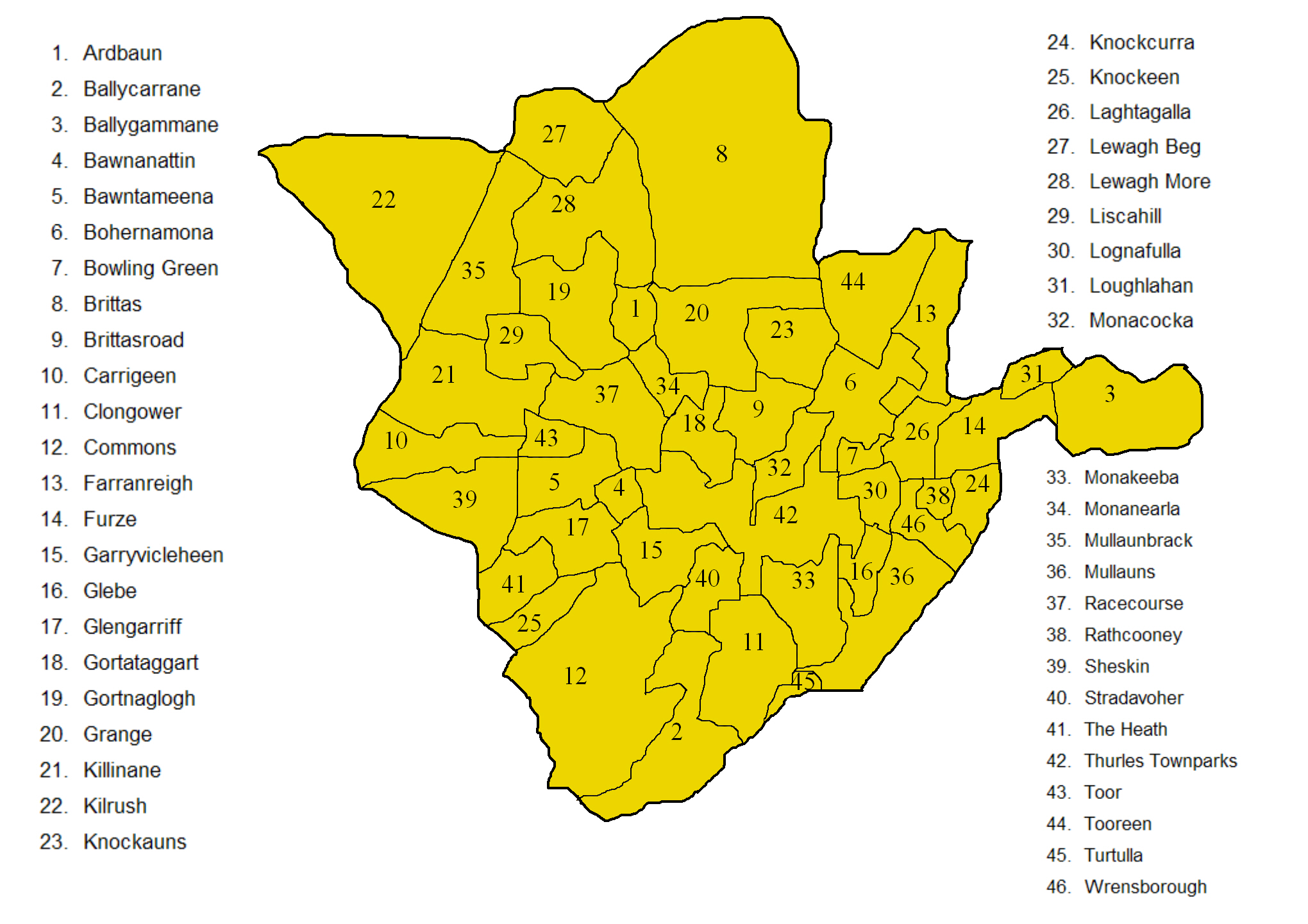
Map of the townlands in the parish

Thurles is a civil parish in the barony of Eliogarty in County Tipperary.

== Church of Ireland parish ==
Like all civil parishes in Ireland, this civil parish is derived from, and co-extensive with, a pre-existing parish of the Church of Ireland.

== Townlands ==
The parish is divided into 46 townlands, one of which, Thurles Townparks, contains the historical core of the town of Thurles. These townlands are as follows:

- Ardbaun
- Ballycarrane
- Ballygammane
- Bawnanattin
- Bawntameena
- Bohernamona
- Bowling Green
- Brittas
- Brittasroad
- Carrigeen
- Clongower
- Commons
- Farranreigh
- Furze
- Garryvicleheen
- Glebe
- Glengarriff
- Gortataggart
- Gortnaglogh
- Grange
- Killinane
- Kilrush
- Knockauns
- Knockcurra
- Knockeen
- Laghtagalla
- Lewagh Beg
- Lewagh More
- Liscahill
- Lognafulla
- Loughlahan
- Monacocka
- Monakeeba
- Monanearla
- Mullaunbrack
- Mullauns
- Racecourse
- Rathcooney
- Sheskin
- Stradavoher
- The Heath
- Thurles Townparks
- Toor
- Tooreen
- Turtulla
- Wrensborough
