= Arthur Wellesley, 1st Duke of Wellington =

British Army officer and statesman (1769–1852)

Field Marshal His Grace The Duke of Wellington KG GCB GCH PC FRS
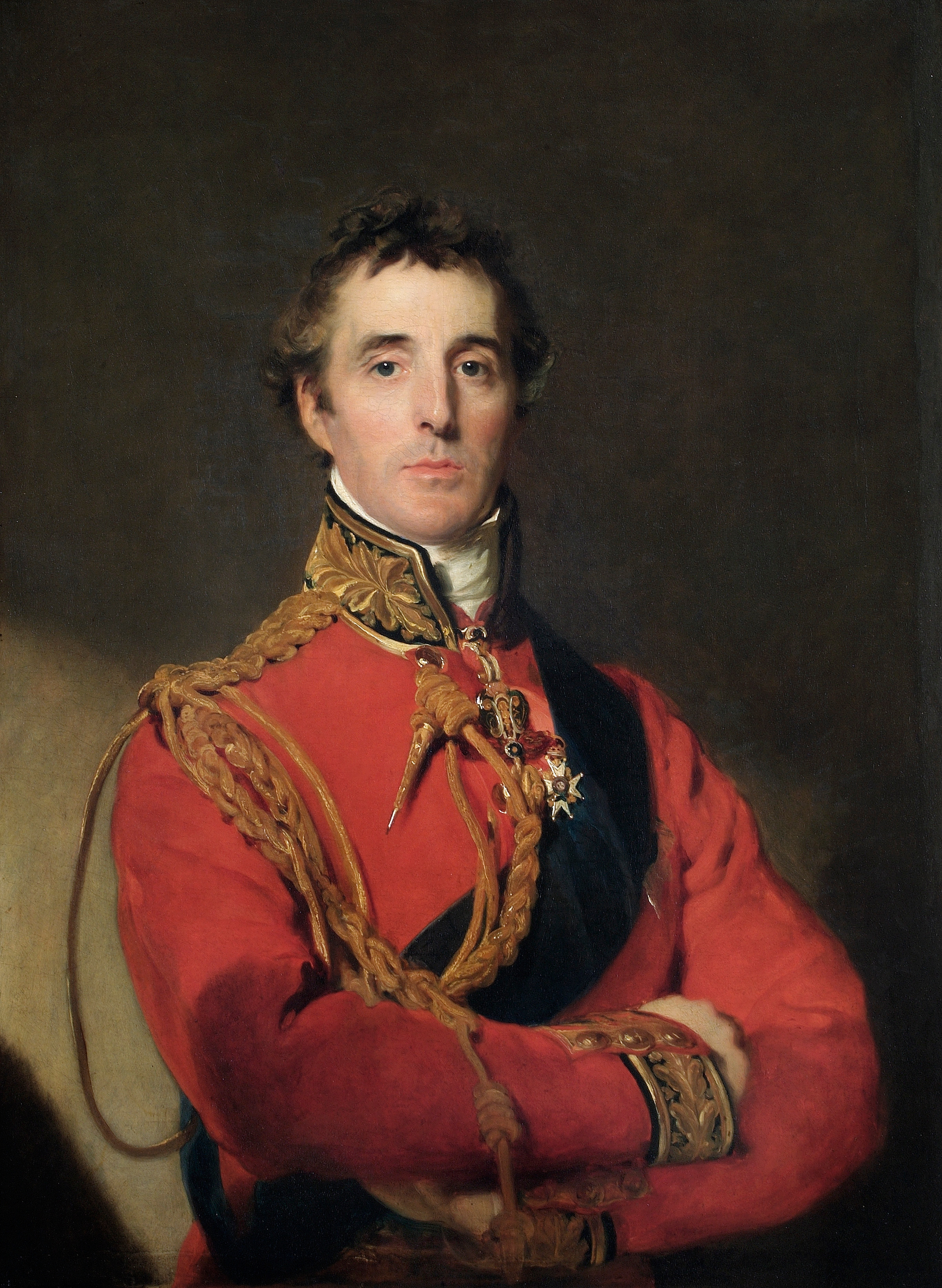
- Portrait of the Duke of Wellington, by Sir Thomas Lawrence, c. 1815–1816

Prime Minister of the United Kingdom

The Duke of Wellington
- Caretaker; 17 November 1834 – 9 December 1834
- Monarch: William IV
- Preceded by: The Viscount Melbourne
- Succeeded by: Robert Peel
- In office 22 January 1828 – 16 November 1830
- Monarchs: George IV; William IV
- Preceded by: The Viscount Goderich
- Succeeded by: The Earl Grey

Commander-in-Chief of the British Army
- In office 15 August 1842 – 14 September 1852
- Monarch: Victoria
- Preceded by: The Viscount Hill
- Succeeded by: The Viscount Hardinge
- In office 22 January 1827 – 22 January 1828
- Monarch: George IV
- Preceded by: The Duke of York and Albany
- Succeeded by: The Viscount Hill

Leader of the House of Lords
- In office 3 September 1841 – 27 June 1846
- Prime Minister: Robert Peel
- Preceded by: The Viscount Melbourne
- Succeeded by: The Marquess of Lansdowne
- In office 14 November 1834 – 18 April 1835
- Prime Minister: Himself; Robert Peel
- Preceded by: The Viscount Melbourne
- Succeeded by: The Viscount Melbourne
- In office 22 January 1828 – 22 November 1830
- Prime Minister: Himself
- Preceded by: The Viscount Goderich
- Succeeded by: The Earl Grey

Secretary of State for Foreign Affairs
- In office 17 November 1834 – 18 April 1835
- Prime Minister: Himself; Robert Peel
- Preceded by: The Viscount Palmerston
- Succeeded by: The Viscount Palmerston

Governor of Srirangapatna & Kingdom of Mysore
- In office 12 Januaray 1799 – 24 January 1805

Personal details
- Born: Arthur Wesley; 1 May 1769 Dublin, Ireland
- Died: 14 September 1852 (aged 83) Walmer, Kent, England, U.K.
- Resting place: St Paul's Cathedral, London, England, U.K.
- Party: Tory (until 1834); Conservative (from 1834)
- Spouse: Catherine Pakenham (m. 1806; died 1831)
- Children: Arthur Wellesley; Lord Charles Wellesley
- Parents: Garret Wesley (father); Anne Hill-Trevor (mother)
- Awards: See list: Knight of the Order of the Garter; Knight Grand Cross of the Order of the Bath; Knight Grand Cross of the Royal Guelphic Order; Knight Grand Cross of the Order of the Sword; Knight of the Order of the Golden Fleece; Knight Grand Cross of the Military William Order
- Nickname

Military service
- Allegiance: Great Britain; United Kingdom
- Branch/service: British Army; Presidency Armies
- Years of service: 1787–1852
- Rank: Field marshal
- Battles/wars: Full list

Selected battles
1799-1803 1807-1813 1815

Field Marshal Arthur Wellesley, 1st Duke of Wellington (né Wesley; 1 May 1769 – 14 September 1852), was a British Army officer and statesman. A leading figure in early-19th-century British politics, Wellesley served as Prime Minister of the United Kingdom and as Commander-in-Chief of the Forces.

Wellesley was born into the Wellesley family in Dublin, in the Kingdom of Ireland. He was commissioned as an ensign in the British Army in 1787, serving in Ireland as aide-de-camp to two successive lords lieutenant of Ireland. He was also elected as a member of Parliament in the Irish House of Commons. Rising to the rank of colonel by 1796, Wellesley served in the Flanders campaign before being sent to India, where he fought in the Fourth Anglo-Mysore War, ending the conflict with a victory at Seringapatam in 1799. He was appointed governor of Seringapatam and Mysore and, as a newly appointed major general, won a decisive victory over the Maratha Confederacy at the Battle of Assaye in 1803.

Rising to prominence as a general officer during the Peninsular War, Wellesley was promoted to field marshal after leading British-led forces to victory against the French army at the Battle of Vitoria in 1813. Following Napoleon's first exile in 1814, Wellesley served as the British ambassador to France and was made Duke of Wellington. During the Hundred Days campaign in 1815, Wellington commanded another British-led army which, together with a Prussian army under Field Marshal Gebhard von Blücher, defeated Napoleon I at the Battle of Waterloo.

After the end of his active military career, Wellington returned to politics, becoming a prominent member of the British Tory party. He served as prime minister from 1828 to 1830, as well as on an interim basis for a little less than a month in 1834. Wellington oversaw the passage of the Roman Catholic Relief Act 1829 and opposed the Reform Act 1832. He continued to be one of the leading figures in the House of Lords until his retirement in 1846 and remained Commander-in-Chief of the Forces until his death in 1852.

== Early life ==
=== Family ===
Arthur Wellesley was born into an aristocratic Anglo-Irish family, belonging to the Protestant Ascendancy, beginning life as the Hon. Arthur Wesley. He was born the son of Anne, Countess of Mornington, and Garret Wesley, 1st Earl of Mornington. His father was himself the son of Richard Wesley, 1st Baron Mornington, and had a short career in politics representing the constituency of Trim in the Irish House of Commons before succeeding his father as Baron Mornington in 1758. Garret Mornington was also an accomplished composer, and in recognition of his musical and philanthropic achievements was elevated to the rank of Earl of Mornington in 1760. Wellesley's mother was the eldest daughter of Arthur Hill-Trevor, 1st Viscount Dungannon, after whom Wellesley was named. Through Elizabeth of Rhuddlan, Wellesley was a descendant of Edward I of England.

Wellesley was the sixth of nine children born to the Earl and Countess of Mornington. His siblings included Richard, Viscount Wellesley, who later became 1st Marquess Wellesley and 2nd Earl of Mornington, William, who later became 1st Baron Maryborough and 3rd Earl of Mornington, and Henry, who later became 1st Baron Cowley.

=== Birth date and place ===
The exact date and location of Wellesley's birth are not known, but biographers mostly follow the same contemporary newspaper evidence, which states that he was born on 1 May 1769, the day before he was baptised in St. Peter's Church on Aungier Street in Dublin. However, the historian Ernest Lloyd states: "The registry of St. Peter's Church, Dublin, shows that he was christened there on 30 April 1769".

Wellesley may have been born at his parents' townhouse, Mornington House at 6 Merrion Street (the address later became known as 24 Upper Merrion Street), Dublin, which now forms part of the Merrion Hotel. His mother, Anne, Countess of Mornington, recalled in 1815 that he had been born at 6 Merrion Street.

His family's home at Dangan Castle, Dangan, near Summerhill in County Meath, has also been purported to have been his birthplace. In his obituary, published in The Times in 1852, it was reported that Dangan was unanimously believed to have been the place of his birth, though suggested it was unlikely, but not impossible, that the family had travelled to Dublin for his baptism. A pillar was erected in his honour near Dangan in 1817.

The place of his birth has been much disputed following his death. Sir Bernard Burke wrote in 1873:

Isn't it remarkable that until recently all the old memoirs of the Duke of Wellington seemed to infer that County Meath was the place of birth. Nowadays the theory that he was born in Dublin is generally accepted but by no means proved.

Other places that have been put forward as the location of his birth include a coach between Meath and Dublin, the Dublin packet boat and the Wellesley townhouse in Trim, County Meath.

=== Childhood ===
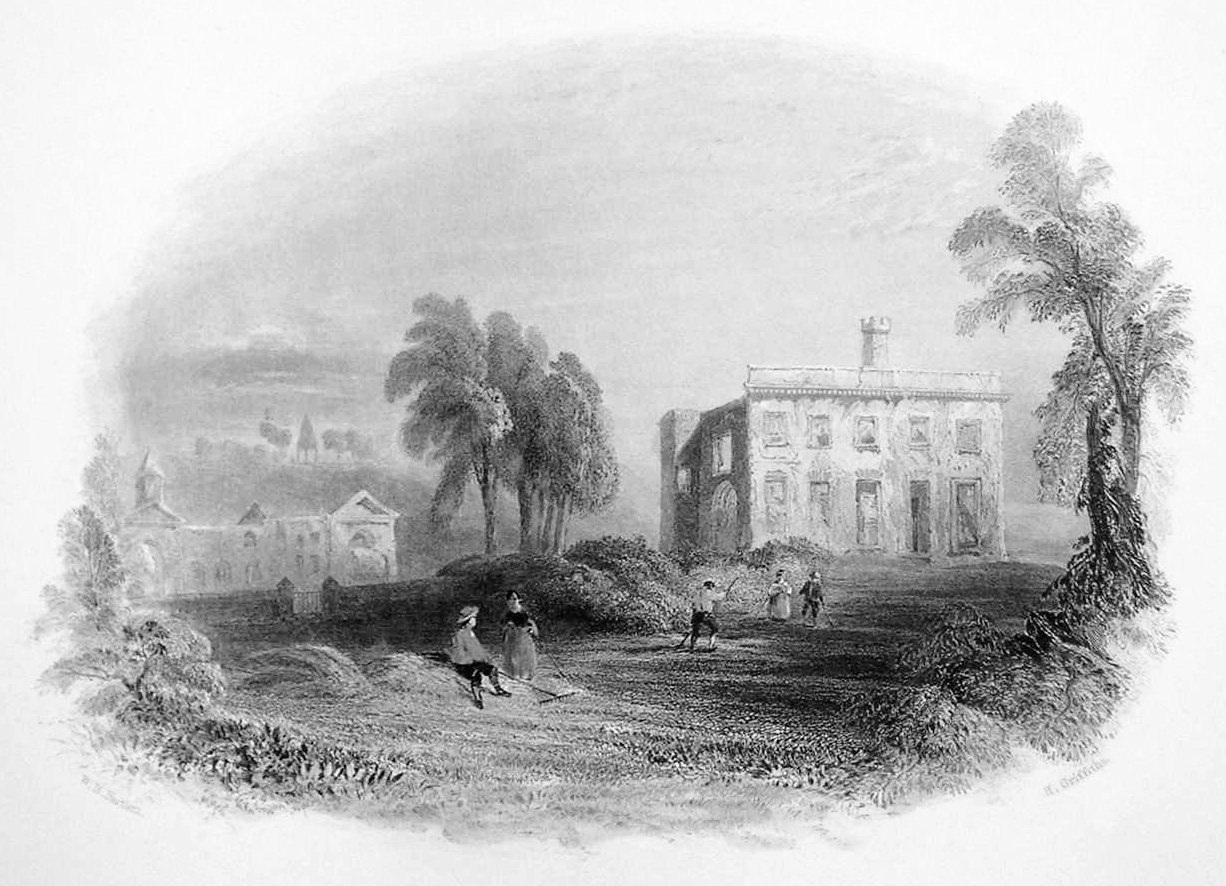
Wellesley spent much of his early childhood at his family's ancestral home, Dangan Castle in County Meath, Ireland (engraving, 1842).

Wellesley spent most of his childhood at his family's two homes, the first a large house in Dublin, Mornington House, and the second Dangan Castle, 3 miles (5 km) north of Summerhill in County Meath. In 1781 his father died and his eldest brother, Richard, inherited his father's earldom.

Wellesley went to the diocesan school in Trim when at Dangan, Mr Whyte's Academy when in Dublin, and Brown's School in Chelsea when in London. He then enrolled at Eton College, where he studied from 1781 to 1784. His loneliness there caused him to hate it, and makes it highly unlikely that he actually said "The Battle of Waterloo was won on the playing fields of Eton", a quotation which is often attributed to him. Moreover, Eton had no playing fields at the time. In 1785, a lack of success at Eton, combined with a shortage of family funds due to his father's death, forced the young Wellesley and his mother to move to Brussels, Belgium. Until his early twenties, Arthur showed little sign of distinction and his mother grew increasingly concerned at his idleness, stating, "I don't know what I shall do with my awkward son Arthur."

In 1786, Wellesley enrolled in the French Royal Academy of Equitation in Angers, France, where he had progressed significantly, becoming a good horseman and learning French, which later proved to be very useful. Upon returning to England, UK, later the same year, he astonished his mother with his improvement.

== Early military career: 1787–1796 ==
=== Ireland: 1787–1793 ===
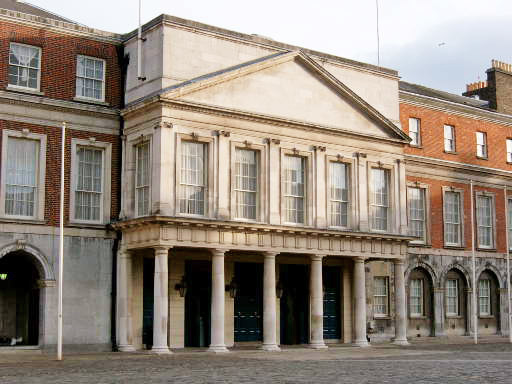
Beginning in 1787, Wellesley served at Dublin Castle (pictured) as aide-de-camp to two successive Lords Lieutenant of Ireland

Despite his new promise, Wellesley had yet to find a job and his family was still short of money, so upon the advice of his mother, his brother Richard asked his friend the Duke of Rutland (then Lord Lieutenant of Ireland) to consider Arthur for a commission in the Army. Soon afterward, on 7 March 1787, he was gazetted ensign in the 73rd Regiment of Foot. In October, with the assistance of his brother, he was assigned as aide-de-camp, on ten shillings a day (twice his pay as an ensign), to the new Lord Lieutenant of Ireland, Lord Buckingham. He was also transferred to the new 76th Regiment forming in Ireland and on Christmas Day, 1787, was promoted to lieutenant. During his time in Dublin his duties were mainly social; attending balls, entertaining guests and providing advice to Buckingham. While in Ireland, he overextended himself in borrowing due to his occasional gambling, but in his defence stated that "I have often known what it was to be in want of money, but I have never got helplessly into debt".

On 23 January 1788 he transferred into the 41st Regiment of Foot, then again on 25 June 1789 he transferred to the 12th (Prince of Wales's) Regiment of (Light) Dragoons and, according to the military historian Richard Holmes, he also reluctantly entered politics. Shortly before the general election of 1789, he went to the rotten borough of Trim to speak against the granting of the title "Freeman" of Dublin to the parliamentary leader of the Irish Patriot Party, Henry Grattan. Succeeding, he was later nominated and duly elected as a Member of Parliament (MP) for Trim in the Irish House of Commons. Because of the limited suffrage at the time, he sat in a parliament in which at least two-thirds of the members owed their election to the landowners of fewer than a hundred boroughs. Wellesley continued to serve at Dublin Castle, voting with the government in the Irish parliament over the next two years. He became a captain on 30 January 1791 and was transferred to the 58th Regiment of Foot.

On 31 October, he transferred to the 18th Light Dragoons. During this period he grew increasingly attracted to Kitty Pakenham, the daughter of Edward Pakenham, 2nd Baron Longford. She was described as being full of 'gaiety and charm'. In 1793 he proposed, but was turned down by her brother Thomas, 2nd Earl of Longford, who considered Wellesley to be a young man, in debt, with very poor prospects. An aspiring amateur musician, Wellesley, devastated by the rejection, burnt his violins in anger, and resolved to pursue a military career in earnest. He became a major by purchase in the 33rd Regiment in 1793. A few months later, in September, his brother lent him more money and with it he purchased a lieutenant-colonelcy in the 33rd.

=== Netherlands: 1794–1795 ===
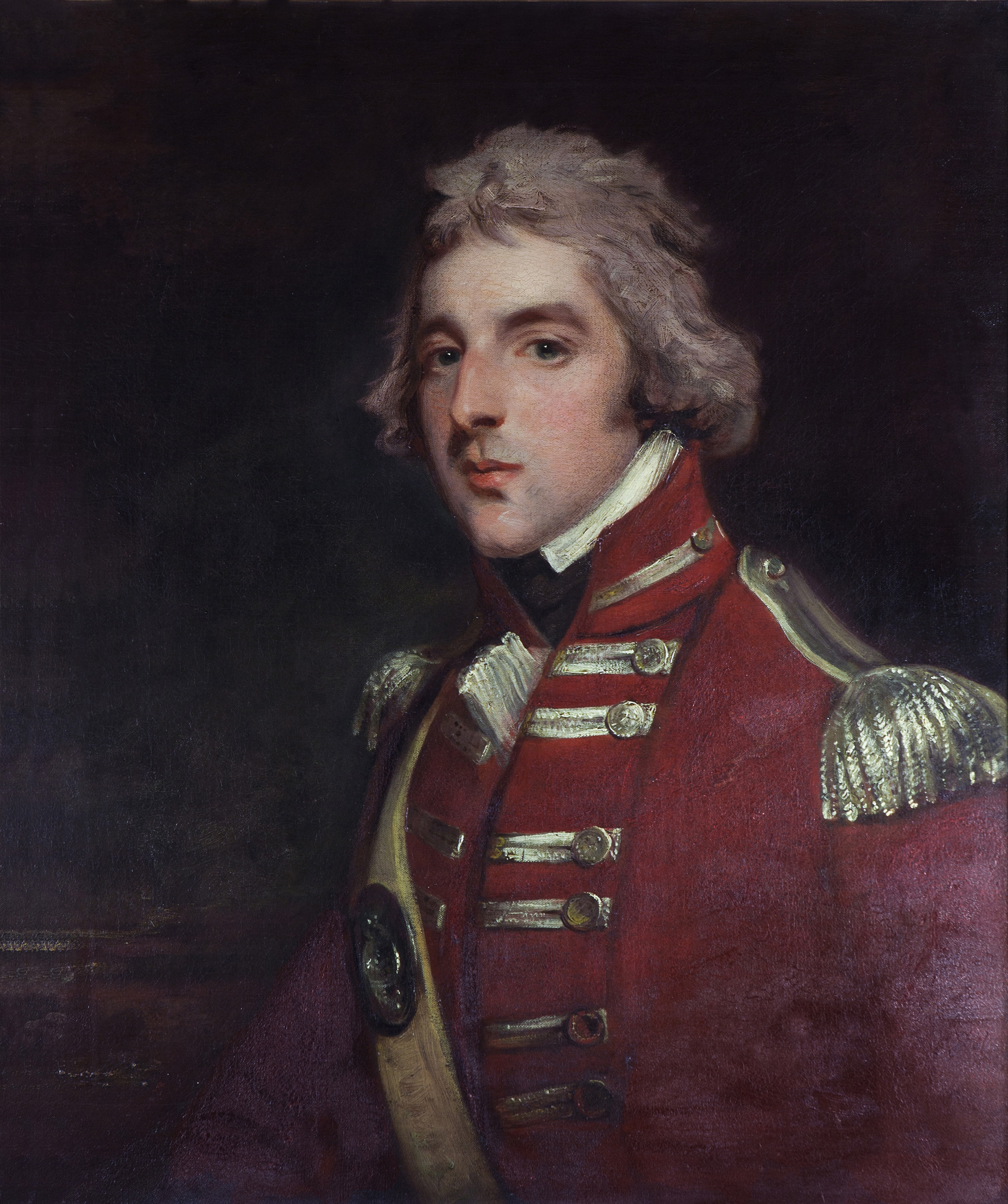
Wellesley as Lieutenant Colonel, aged c. 26, in the 33rd Regiment. Portrait of Arthur Wellesley by John Hoppner, 1795.

In 1793 Prince Frederick, Duke of York and Albany, was sent to Flanders in command of the British contingent of an allied force destined for the invasion of France. In June 1794 Wellesley with the 33rd regiment set sail from Cork bound for Ostend as part of an expedition bringing reinforcements for the army in Flanders. They arrived too late to participate, and joined the Duke of York as he was pulling back towards the Netherlands. On 15 September 1794, at the Battle of Boxtel, east of Breda, Wellesley, in temporary command of his brigade, had his first experience of battle. During General Ralph Abercromby's withdrawal in the face of superior French forces, the 33rd held off enemy cavalry, allowing neighbouring units to retreat safely. During the extremely harsh winter that followed, Wellesley and his regiment formed part of an allied force holding the defence line along the Waal River. The 33rd, along with the rest of the army, suffered heavy losses from attrition and illness. Wellesley's health was also affected by the damp environment.

Though the campaign was to end disastrously, with the British army driven out of the United Provinces into the German states, Wellesley became more aware of battle tactics, including the use of lines of infantry against advancing columns, and the merits of supporting sea-power. He understood that the failure of the campaign was due in part to the faults of the leaders and the poor organisation at headquarters. He remarked later of his time in the Netherlands that "At least I learned what not to do, and that is always a valuable lesson".

=== Brief return to Britain: 1795–1796 ===
After returning to England in March 1795, he was reinstated as a member of the Irish parliament for Trim. He hoped to be given the position of secretary of war in the new Irish government but the new lord-lieutenant, Lord Camden, was only able to offer him the post of Surveyor-General of the Ordnance. Declining the post, he returned to his regiment, now at Southampton preparing to set sail for the West Indies. After seven weeks at sea, a storm forced the fleet back to Poole. The 33rd was given time to recuperate and a few months later, Whitehall decided to send the regiment to India. Wellesley was promoted full colonel by seniority on 3 May 1796 and a few weeks later set sail for Calcutta with his regiment.

== India: 1797–1805 ==
Arriving in Calcutta in February 1797, he spent five months there before being sent in August to a brief expedition to the Philippines, where he established a list of new hygiene precautions for his men to deal with the unfamiliar climate. Returning in November to India, he learnt that his elder brother Richard, now known as Lord Mornington, had been appointed as the new Governor-General of India. He travelled aboard the ship Endeavour, commanded by Captain Robert Eastwick, who recounts in detail the passage from Madras to Calcutta in his autobiographical narrative.

In 1798 he changed the spelling of his surname to "Wellesley"; up to this time he was still known as Wesley, which his eldest brother considered the ancient and proper spelling.

=== Fourth Anglo-Mysore War: 1798–1799 ===
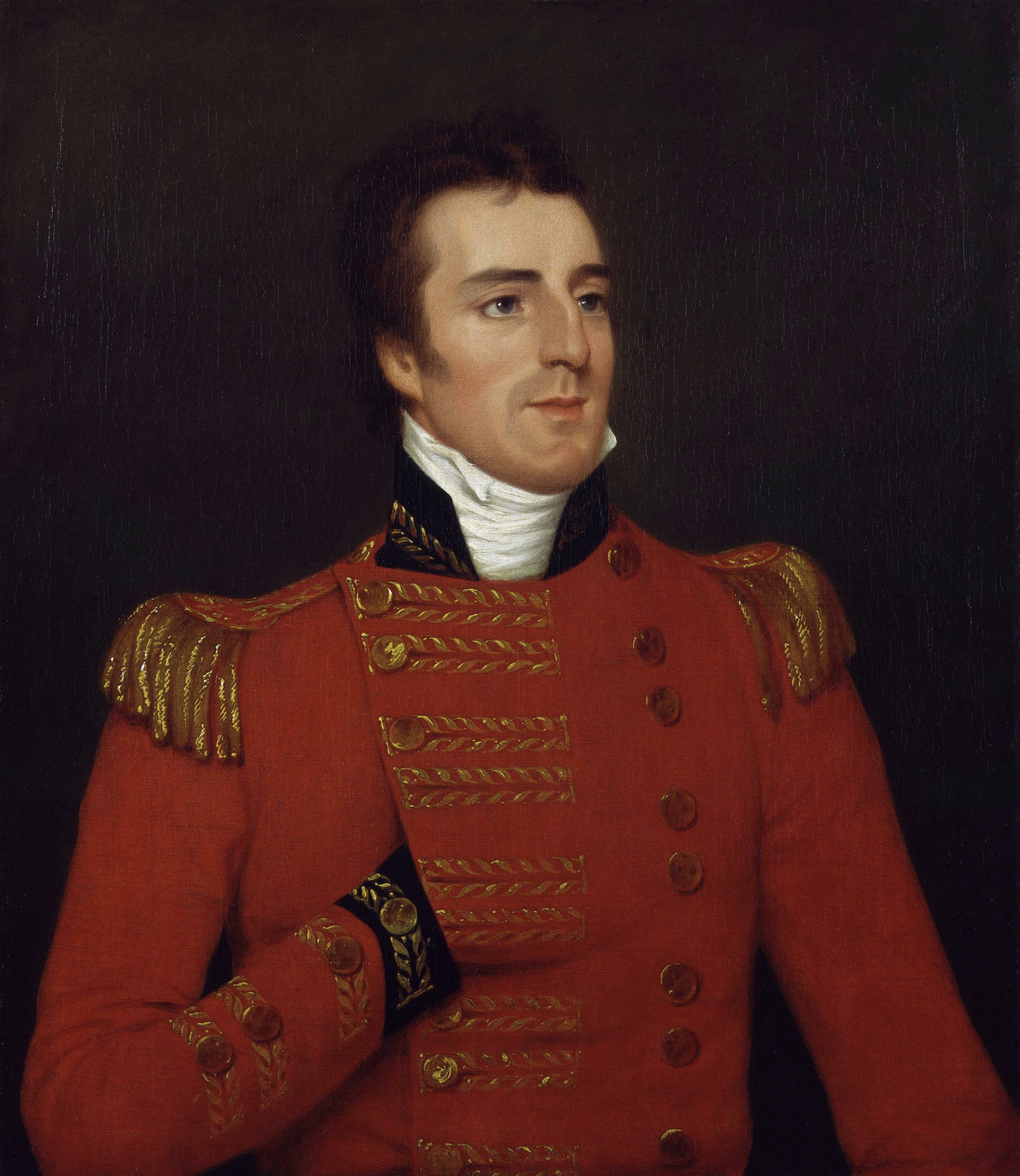
1804 portrait of Wellesley by Robert Home

As part of the campaign to extend Company rule in India, the Fourth Anglo-Mysore War broke out in 1798 against the Sultan of Mysore, Tipu Sultan. Arthur's brother Richard ordered that an armed force be sent to capture Seringapatam and defeat Tipu. During the war, rockets were used on several occasions. Wellesley was almost defeated by Tipu's Diwan, Purnaiah, at the Battle of Sultanpet Tope. Quoting Forrest,

At this point (near the village of Sultanpet, Figure 5) there was a large tope, or grove, which gave shelter to Tipu's rocketmen and had obviously to be cleaned out before the siege could be pressed closer to Srirangapattana island. The commander chosen for this operation was Col. Wellesley, but advancing towards the tope after dark on the 5th April 1799, he was set upon with rockets and musket-fires, lost his way and, as Beatson politely puts it, had to "postpone the attack" until a more favourable opportunity should offer.

The following day, Wellesley launched a fresh attack with a larger force, and took the whole position without any killed in action. On 22 April 1799, twelve days before the main battle, rocketeers maneuvered to the rear of the British encampment, then 'threw a great number of rockets at the same instant' to signal the beginning of an assault by 6,000 Indian infantry and a corps of Frenchmen, all ordered by Mir Golam Hussain and Mohomed Hulleen Mir Miran. The rockets had a range of about 1,000 yards/metres. Some burst in the air like shells. Others, called ground rockets, would rise again on striking the ground and bound along in a serpentine motion until their force was spent. According to one British observer, a young English officer named Bayly: "So pestered were we with the rocket boys that there was no moving without danger from the destructive missiles ...". He continued:

The rockets and musketry from 20,000 of the enemy were incessant. No hail could be thicker. Every illumination of blue lights was accompanied by a shower of rockets, some of which entered the head of the column, passing through to the rear, causing death, wounds, and dreadful lacerations from the long bamboos of twenty or thirty feet, which are invariably attached to them.

Under the command of General George Harris, some 24,000 troops were dispatched to Madras (to join an equal force being sent from Bombay in the west). Arthur and the 33rd sailed to join them in August.

After extensive and careful logistic preparation (which would become one of Wellesley's main attributes) the 33rd left with the main force in December and travelled across 250 miles (400 km) of jungle from Madras to Mysore. On account of his brother, during the journey, Wellesley was given an additional command, that of chief advisor to Nizam Ali Khan, Asaf Jah II of Hyderabad's army (sent to accompany the British force). This position was to cause friction among many of the senior officers (some of whom were senior to Wellesley). Much of this friction was put to rest after the Battle of Mallavelly, some 20 miles (30 km) from Seringapatam, in which Harris' army attacked a large part of the sultan's army. During the battle, Wellesley led his men, in a line of battle of two ranks, against the enemy to a gentle ridge and gave the order to fire. After an extensive repetition of volleys, followed by a bayonet charge, the 33rd, in conjunction with the rest of Harris's force, forced Tipu's infantry to retreat.

=== Seringapatam: 1799 ===
Immediately after their arrival at Seringapatam on 5 April 1799, the Battle of Seringapatam began and Wellesley was ordered to lead a night attack on the village of Sultanpettah, adjacent to the fortress to clear the way for the artillery. Because of a variety of factors including the Mysorean army's strong defensive preparations and the darkness the attack failed with 25 casualties due to confusion among the British. Wellesley suffered a minor injury to his knee from a spent musket-ball. Although they re-attacked successfully the next day, after time to scout ahead the enemy's positions, the affair affected Wellesley. He resolved "never to attack an enemy who is preparing and strongly posted, and whose posts have not been reconnoitred by daylight". Lewin Bentham Bowring gives this alternative account:

One of these groves, called the Sultanpet Tope, was intersected by deep ditches, watered from a channel running in an easterly direction about a mile from the fort. General Baird was directed to scour this grove and dislodge the enemy, but on his advancing with this object on the night of the 5th, he found the tope unoccupied. The next day, however, the Mysore troops again took possession of the ground, and as it was absolutely necessary to expel them, two columns were detached at sunset for the purpose. The first of these, under Colonel Shawe, got possession of a ruined village, which it successfully held. The second column, under Colonel Wellesley, on advancing into the tope, was at once attacked in the darkness of night by a tremendous fire of musketry and rockets. The men, floundering about amidst the trees and the water-courses, at last broke, and fell back in disorder, some being killed and a few taken prisoners. In the confusion Colonel Wellesley was himself struck on the knee by a spent ball, and narrowly escaped falling into the hands of the enemy.

A few weeks later, after extensive artillery bombardment, a breach was opened in the main walls of the fortress of Seringapatam. An attack led by Major-general David Baird secured the fortress. Wellesley secured the rear of the advance, posting guards at the breach and then stationed his regiment at the main palace. After hearing news of the death of the Tipu Sultan, Wellesley was the first at the scene to confirm his death, checking his pulse. Over the coming day, Wellesley grew increasingly concerned over the lack of discipline among his men, who drank and pillaged the fortress and city. To restore order, several soldiers were flogged and four hanged.

After battle and the resulting end of the war, the main force under General Harris left Seringapatam and Wellesley, aged 30, stayed behind to command the area as the new Governor of Seringapatam and Mysore. While in India, Wellesley was ill for a considerable time, first with severe diarrhoea from the water and then with fever, followed by a serious skin infection caused by trichophyton.

=== Dhondia Wagh insurgency: 1800 ===
In 1800, whilst serving as Governor of Mysore, Wellesley was tasked with putting down an insurgency led by Dhondia Wagh, formerly a Patan trooper for Tipu Sultan. Having escaped after the fall of Seringapatam he became a powerful brigand, raiding villages along the Maratha–Mysore border region.

Despite initial setbacks, the East India Company having pursued and destroyed his forces once already, forcing him into retreat in August 1799, he raised a sizeable force composed of disbanded Mysore soldiers, captured small outposts and forts in Mysore, and was receiving the support of several Maratha killedars opposed to British occupation. This drew the attention of the British administration, who were beginning to recognise him as more than just a bandit, as his raids, expansion and threats to destabilise British authority suddenly increased in 1800. The death of Tipu Sultan had created a power vacuum and Wagh was seeking to fill it.

Given independent command of a combined East India Company and British Army force, Wellesley ventured north to confront Wagh in June 1800, with an army of 8,000 infantry and cavalry, having learnt that Wagh's forces numbered over 50,000, although the majority (around 30,000) were irregular light cavalry and unlikely to pose a serious threat to British infantry and artillery.

Throughout June–August 1800, Wellesley advanced through Wagh's territory, his troops escalading forts in turn and capturing each one with "trifling loss". The forts generally offered little resistance due to their poor construction and design. Wellesley did not have sufficient troops to garrison each fort and had to clear the surrounding area of insurgents before advancing to the next fort. On 31 July, he had "taken and destroyed Dhondiah's baggage and six guns, and driven into the Malpoorba (where they were drowned) about five thousand people". Dhondiah continued to retreat, but his forces were rapidly deserting, he had no infantry and due to the monsoon weather flooding river crossings he could no longer outpace the British advance.

On 10 September, at the Battle of Conagul, Wellesley personally led a charge of 1,400 British dragoons and Indian cavalry, in single line with no reserve, against Dhondiah and his remaining 5,000 cavalry. Dhondiah was killed during the clash; his body was discovered and taken to the British camp tied to a cannon. With this victory, Wellesley's campaign was concluded, and British authority had been restored. Wellesley then paid for the future upkeep of Dhondiah's orphaned son.

=== Kottayam War: 1800 ===
Wellesley was also placed in overall command during the Kottayam War in South India. To counter the Kingdom's tactics, he planned a double-pronged move from Malabar Coast and camps near Mysore into Wayanad. Wellesley was reported to have been involved in the Battle of Panamarathukotta, which ended in an ambush and British defeat at the hands of Pazhassi Raja and Edachena Kunkan, though by the end of 1805, the British forces had managed to find Pazhassi Raja's hideout where the King took his life. Wellesley would study and adopt the methods of guerrilla warfare used by the Pazhassi Raja to defeat Napoleon's campaigns in Spain.

=== Planned expedition against Batavia and Mauritius: 1801 ===
Wellesley was in charge of raising an Anglo-Indian expeditionary force in Trincomali in early 1801 for the capture of Batavia and Mauritius from the French. However, on the eve of its departure, orders arrived from England that it was to be sent to Egypt to co-operate with Sir Ralph Abercromby in the expulsion of the French from Egypt. Wellesley had been appointed second in command to Baird, but owing to ill health did not accompany the expedition on 9 April 1801. This was fortunate for Wellesley, since the vessel on which he was to have sailed sank in the Red Sea.

He was promoted to brigadier-general on 17 July 1801. He took residence within the Sultan's summer palace and reformed the tax and justice systems in his province to maintain order and prevent bribery.

=== Second Anglo-Maratha War: 1802–1803 ===
In September 1802 Wellesley learnt that he had been promoted to the rank of major general. He had been gazetted on 29 April 1802, but the news took several months to reach him by sea. He remained at Mysore until November, when he was sent to command an army in the Second Anglo-Maratha War.

When he determined that a long defensive war would ruin his army, Wellesley decided to act boldly to defeat the numerically larger force of the Maratha Empire. With the logistic assembly of his army complete (24,000 men in total) he gave the order to break camp and attack the nearest Maratha fort on 8 August 1803. The fort surrendered on 12 August after an infantry attack had exploited an artillery-made breach in the wall. With the fort now in British control Wellesley was able to extend control southwards to the Godavari River.

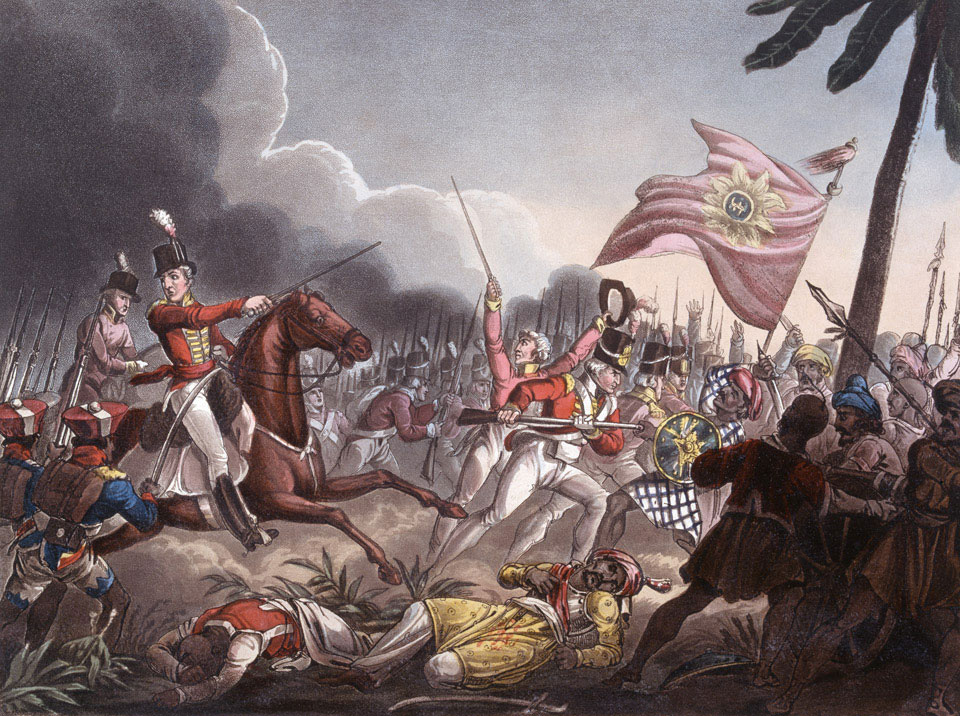
Arthur Wellesley (mounted) at the Battle of Assaye (engraving after William Heath). Wellesley later remarked that it was his greatest victory.

Splitting his army into two forces to pursue and locate the main Marathas army (the second force, commanded by Colonel Stevenson was far smaller), Wellesley was preparing to rejoin his forces on 24 September. His intelligence, however, reported the location of the Marathas' main army, between two rivers near Assaye. If he waited for the arrival of his second force, the Marathas would be able to mount a retreat, so Wellesley decided to launch an attack immediately.

On 23 September Wellesley led his forces over a ford in the river Kaitna and the Battle of Assaye commenced. After crossing the ford the infantry was reorganised into several lines and advanced against the Maratha infantry. Wellesley ordered his cavalry to exploit the flank of the Maratha army just near the village. During the battle Wellesley himself came under fire; two of his horses were shot from under him and he had to mount a third. At a crucial moment, Wellesley regrouped his forces and ordered Colonel Maxwell (later killed in the attack) to attack the eastern end of the Maratha position while Wellesley himself directed a renewed infantry attack against the centre.

An officer in the attack wrote of the importance of Wellesley's personal leadership: "The General was in the thick of the action the whole time ... I never saw a man so cool and collected as he was ... though I can assure you, till our troops got the order to advance the fate of the day seemed doubtful ..." With some 6,000 Marathas killed or wounded, the enemy was routed, though Wellesley's force was in no condition to pursue. British casualties were heavy: the British losses amounted to 428 killed, 1,138 wounded and 18 missing (the British casualty figures were taken from Wellesley's own despatch). Wellesley was troubled by the loss of men and remarked that he hoped "I should not like to see again such loss as I sustained on 23 September, even if attended by such gain". Years later, however, he remarked that Assaye and not Waterloo was the best battle he ever fought.

Despite the damage done to the Maratha army, the battle did not end the war. A few months later in November, Wellesley attacked a larger force near Argaum, leading his army to victory again, with an astonishing 5,000 enemy dead at the cost of only 361 British casualties. A further successful attack at the fortress at Gawilghur, combined with the victory of General Gerard Lake at Delhi, forced the Maratha to sign a peace settlement at Anjangaon (not concluded until a year later) called the Treaty of Surji-Anjangaon.

Military historian Richard Holmes remarked that Wellesley's experiences in India had an important influence on his personality and military tactics, teaching him much about military matters that would prove vital to his success in the Peninsular War. These included a strong sense of discipline through drill and order, the use of diplomacy to gain allies, and the vital necessity of a secure supply line. He also established high regard for the acquisition of intelligence through scouts and spies. His personal tastes also developed, including dressing himself in white trousers, a dark tunic, with Hessian boots and black cocked hat (that later became synonymous as his style).

=== Leaving India: 1804–1805 ===
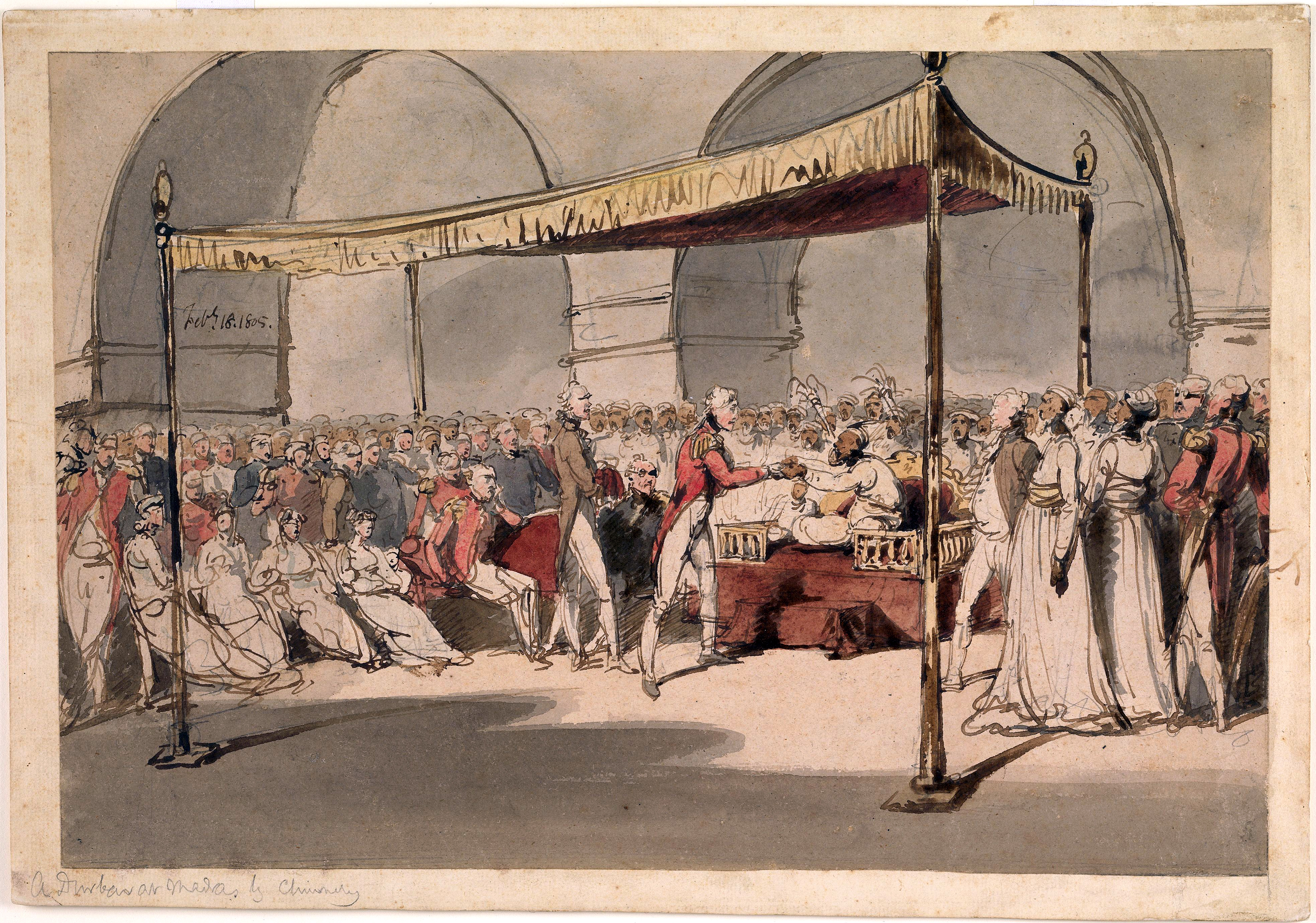
Illustration of Wellesley meeting with Azim-ud-Daula in 1805 by George Chinnery

Wellesley grew tired of his time in India, remarking, "I have served as long in India as any man ought who can serve anywhere else". In June 1804 he applied for permission to return home and as a reward for his service in India he was made a Knight of the Bath in September. While in India, Wellesley had amassed a fortune of £42,000 (equivalent to £4.2 million in 2024), consisting mainly of prize money from his campaign. When his brother's term as Governor-General of India ended in March 1805, the brothers returned together to England on HMS Howe. Wellesley, coincidentally, stopped on his voyage at the island of Saint Helena and stayed in the same building in which Napoleon would live during his later exile.

== Return to Britain: 1805–1808 ==
=== Meeting Nelson ===
In September 1805, Wellesley was newly returned from his campaigns in India and was not yet particularly well known to the public. He reported to the office of the Secretary of State for War and the Colonies to request a new assignment. In the waiting room, he met Vice-admiral Horatio Nelson, already a well known figure after his victories at the Nile and Copenhagen, who was briefly in England, UK, after months pursuing the French Toulon fleet to the West Indies and back. Some 30 years later, Wellington recalled a conversation that Nelson began with him which Wellesley found "almost all on his side in a style so vain and silly as to surprise and almost disgust me". Nelson left the room to inquire who the young general was, and on his return switched to a very different tone, discussing the war, the state of the colonies, and the geopolitical situation as between equals. On this second discussion, Wellington recalled, "I don't know that I ever had a conversation that interested me more". This was the only time that the two men met; Nelson was killed at his victory at Trafalgar seven weeks later.

Wellesley then served in the abortive Anglo-Russian expedition to north Germany in 1805, taking a brigade to Elbe. He then took a period of extended leave from the army and was elected as a Tory member of the British parliament for Rye in January 1806. A year later, he was elected the member of Parliament for Newport on the Isle of Wight, and was then appointed to serve as Chief Secretary for Ireland under the Duke of Richmond. At the same time, he was made a privy counsellor. While in Ireland, he gave a verbal promise that the remaining Penal Laws would be enforced with great moderation, perhaps an indication of his later willingness to support Catholic emancipation. Wellesley was described as having been "handsome, very brown, quite bald and a hooked nose".

=== Marriage to Kitty Pakenham ===
Wellesley was married by his brother Gerald, a clergyman, to Kitty Pakenham in St George's Church, Dublin, on 10 April 1806. They had two children: Arthur was born in 1807 and Charles was born in 1808. The marriage proved unsatisfactory and the two spent years apart, while Wellesley was campaigning and afterwards. Kitty grew depressed, and Wellesley pursued other sexual and romantic partners. The couple largely lived apart, with Kitty spending most of her time at their country home, Stratfield Saye House, and Wellesley at their London home, Apsley House. Kitty's brother Edward Pakenham served under Wellesley throughout the Peninsular War, and Wellesley's regard for him helped to smooth his relations with Kitty, until Pakenham's death at the Battle of New Orleans in 1815.

=== War against Denmark–Norway ===
Wellesley was in Ireland in May 1807 when he heard of the British expedition to Denmark–Norway. He decided to go, while maintaining his political appointments, and was appointed to command an infantry brigade in the Second Battle of Copenhagen, which took place in August. He fought at Køge, during which the men under his command took 1,500 prisoners, with Wellesley later present during the surrender.

By 30 September he had returned to England and was raised to the rank of lieutenant general on 25 April 1808. In June 1808 he accepted the command of an expedition of 9,000 men. Preparing to sail for an attack on the Spanish colonies in South America (to assist the Latin American patriot Francisco de Miranda) his force was instead ordered to sail for the Kingdom of Portugal, to take part in the Peninsular Campaign and rendezvous with 5,000 troops from Gibraltar.

== Peninsular War: 1808–1814 ==
=== Vimeiro and the Convention of Sintra: 1808 ===
Ready for battle, Wellesley left Cork on 12 July 1808 to participate in the war against French forces in the Iberian Peninsula, with his skills as a commander tested and developed. According to the historian Robin Neillands:

Wellesley had by now acquired the experience on which his later successes were founded. He knew about command from the ground up, about the importance of logistics, about campaigning in a hostile environment. He enjoyed political influence and realised the need to maintain support at home. Above all, he had gained a clear idea of how, by setting attainable objectives and relying on his own force and abilities, a campaign could be fought and won.

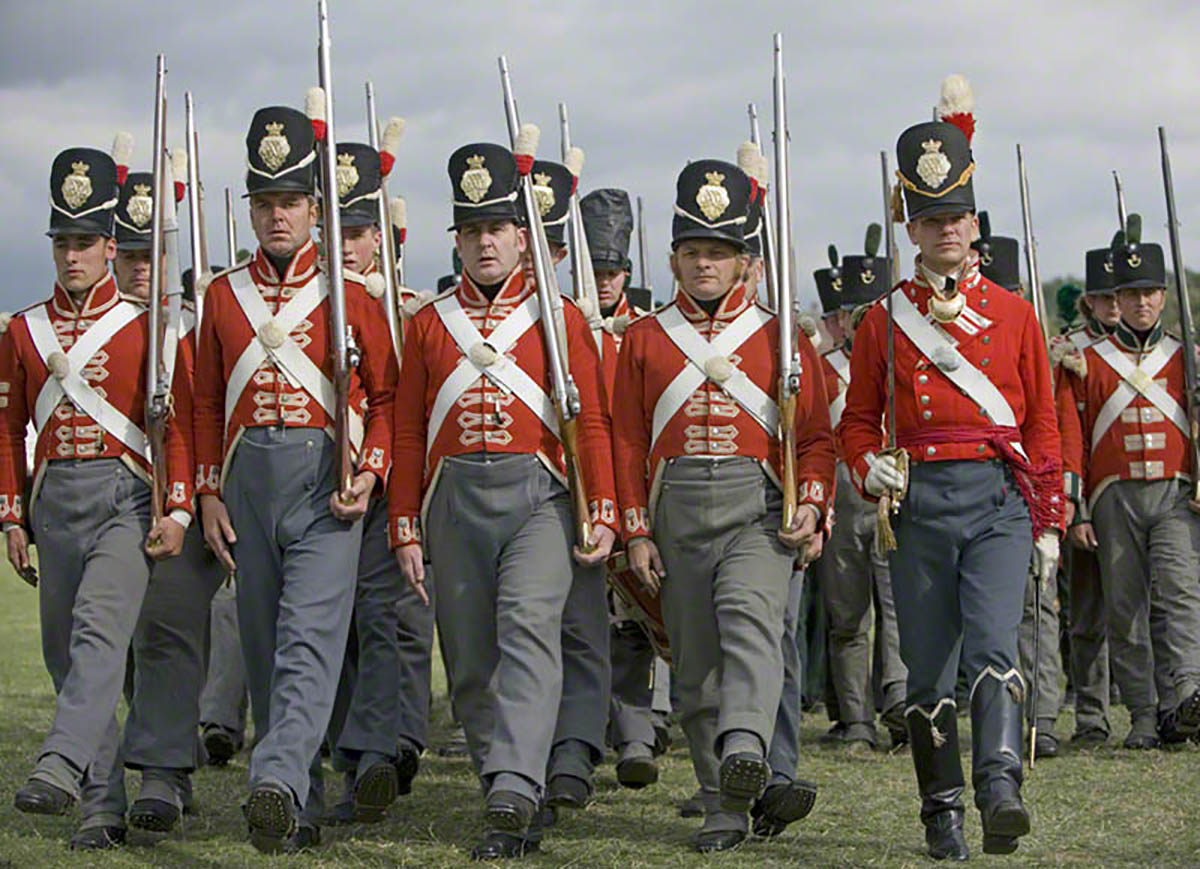
Reenactors of the 33rd Regiment of Foot Wellington's Redcoats who fought in the Napoleonic Wars, 1812–1815, here showing the standard line 8th Company

Wellesley defeated the French at the Battle of Roliça and the Battle of Vimeiro in 1808 but was superseded in command immediately after the latter battle. General Dalrymple then signed the controversial Convention of Sintra, which stipulated that the Royal Navy transport the French army out of Lisbon with all their loot, and insisted on the association of the only available government minister, Wellesley. Dalrymple and Wellesley were recalled to Britain to face a Court of Enquiry. Wellesley had agreed to sign the preliminary armistice, but had not signed the convention, and was cleared.

Simultaneously, Napoleon entered Spain with his veteran troops to put down the revolt; the new commander of the British forces in the Peninsula, Sir John Moore, died during the Battle of Corunna in January 1809.

Although overall the land war with France was not going well from a British perspective, the Peninsula was the one theatre where they, with the Portuguese, had provided strong resistance against France and her allies. This contrasted with the disastrous Walcheren expedition, which was typical of the mismanaged British operations of the time. Wellesley submitted a memorandum to Lord Castlereagh on the defence of Portugal. He stressed its mountainous frontiers and advocated Lisbon as the main base because the Royal Navy could help to defend it. Castlereagh and the cabinet approved the memo and appointed him head of all British forces in Portugal.

=== Talavera campaign: 1809 ===
Wellesley arrived in Lisbon on 22 April 1809 on board HMS Surveillante, after narrowly escaping shipwreck. Reinforced, he took to the offensive. In the Second Battle of Porto he crossed the Douro river in a daylight coup de main, and routed Marshal Jean-de-Dieu Soult's French troops in Porto.

With Portugal secured, Wellesley advanced into Spain to unite with General Cuesta's forces. The combined allied force prepared for an assault on Marshal Claude-Victor Perrin's I Corps at Talavera, 23 July. Cuesta, however, was reluctant to agree, and was only persuaded to advance on the following day. The delay allowed the French to withdraw, but Cuesta sent his army headlong after Victor, and found himself faced by almost the entire French army in New Castile—Victor had been reinforced by the Toledo and Madrid garrisons. The Spanish retreated precipitously, necessitating the advance of two British divisions to cover their retreat.

The next day, 27 July, at the Battle of Talavera the French advanced in three columns and were repulsed several times throughout the day by Wellesley, but at a heavy cost to the British force. In the aftermath Marshal Soult's army was discovered to be advancing south, threatening to cut Wellesley off from Portugal. Wellesley moved east on 3 August to block it, leaving 1,500 wounded in the care of the Spanish, intending to confront Soult before finding out that the French were in fact 30,000 strong. The British commander sent the Light Brigade on a dash to hold the bridge over the Tagus at Almaraz. With communications and supply from Lisbon secured for now, Wellesley considered joining with Cuesta again but found out that his Spanish ally had abandoned the British wounded to the French and was thoroughly uncooperative, promising and then refusing to supply the British forces, aggravating Wellesley and causing considerable friction between the British and their Spanish allies. The lack of supplies, coupled with the threat of French reinforcement (including the possible inclusion of Napoleon himself) in the spring, led to the British deciding to retreat into Portugal.

Following his victory at Talavera, Wellesley was elevated to the Peerage of the United Kingdom on 26 August 1809 as Viscount Wellington of Talavera and of Wellington, in Somerset, with the subsidiary title of Baron Douro of Wellesley.

=== Ciudad Rodrigo and stalemate: 1810–1812 ===
In 1810 a newly enlarged French army under Marshal André Masséna invaded Portugal. British opinion was negative and there were suggestions to evacuate Portugal. Instead, Lord Wellington first slowed the French at Buçaco; he then prevented them from taking the Lisbon Peninsula by the construction of massive earthworks, known as the Lines of Torres Vedras, which had been assembled in complete secrecy with their flanks guarded by the Royal Navy. The baffled and starving French invasion forces retreated after six months. Wellington's pursuit was hindered by a series of reverses inflicted by Marshal Michel Ney in a much-lauded rear guard campaign.

In 1811 Masséna returned towards Portugal to relieve Almeida; Wellington narrowly checked the French at the Battle of Fuentes de Oñoro. Simultaneously, his subordinate, Viscount Beresford, fought Soult's 'Army of the South' to a bloody stalemate at the Battle of Albuera in May. Wellington was promoted to full general on 31 July for his services. The French abandoned Almeida, avoiding British pursuit, but retained the twin Spanish fortresses of Ciudad Rodrigo and Badajoz, the 'Keys' guarding the roads through the mountain passes into Portugal.

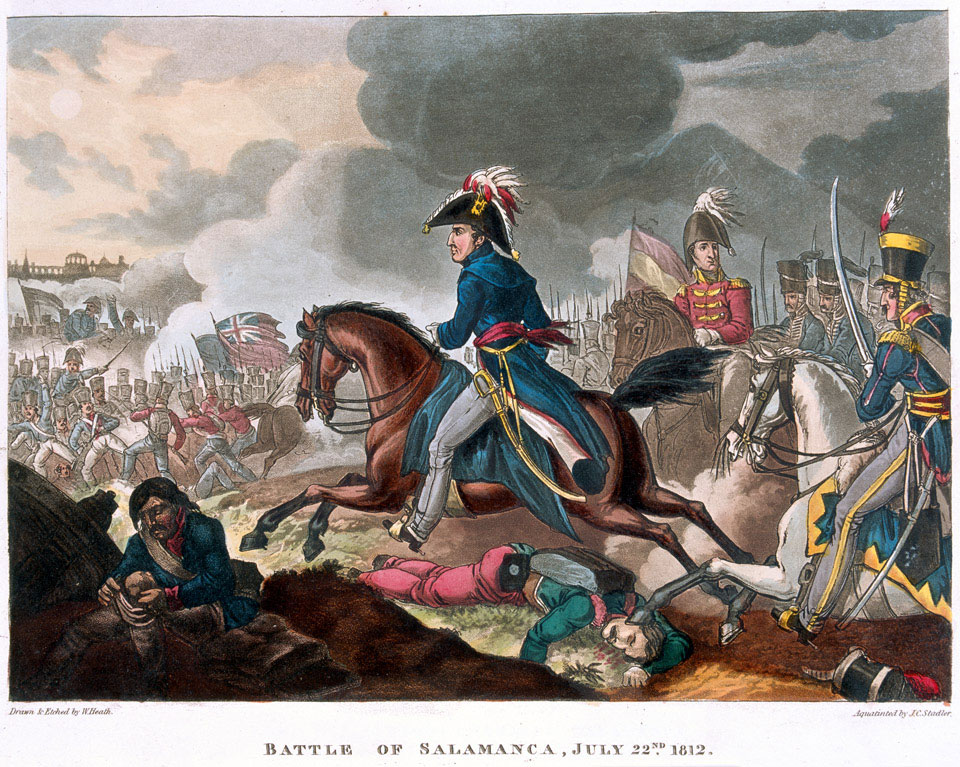
Engraving of Wellington at the Battle of Salamanca

In 1812 Wellington finally captured Ciudad Rodrigo via a rapid movement as the French went into winter quarters, storming it before they could react. He then moved south quickly, besieged the fortress of Badajoz for a month and captured it during the night on 6 April 1812. On viewing the aftermath of the Storming of Badajoz, Wellington lost his composure and cried at the sight of the British dead in the breaches.

His army now was a veteran British force reinforced by units of the retrained Portuguese army. Campaigning in Spain, he was made Earl of Wellington in the county of Somerset on 22 February 1812. He routed the French at the Battle of Salamanca, taking advantage of a minor French mispositioning. The victory liberated the Spanish capital of Madrid. He was later made Marquess of Wellington, in the said county on 18 August 1812.

Wellington attempted to take the vital fortress of Burgos, which linked Madrid to France. He failed, due in part to a lack of siege guns, forcing him into a headlong retreat with the loss of over 2,000 casualties.

The French abandoned Andalusia, and combined the troops of Soult and Auguste de Marmont. Thus combined, the French outnumbered the British, putting the British forces in a precarious position. Wellington withdrew his army and, joined by the smaller corps under the command of Rowland Hill, which had been moved to Madrid, began to retreat to Portugal. Marshal Soult declined to attack.

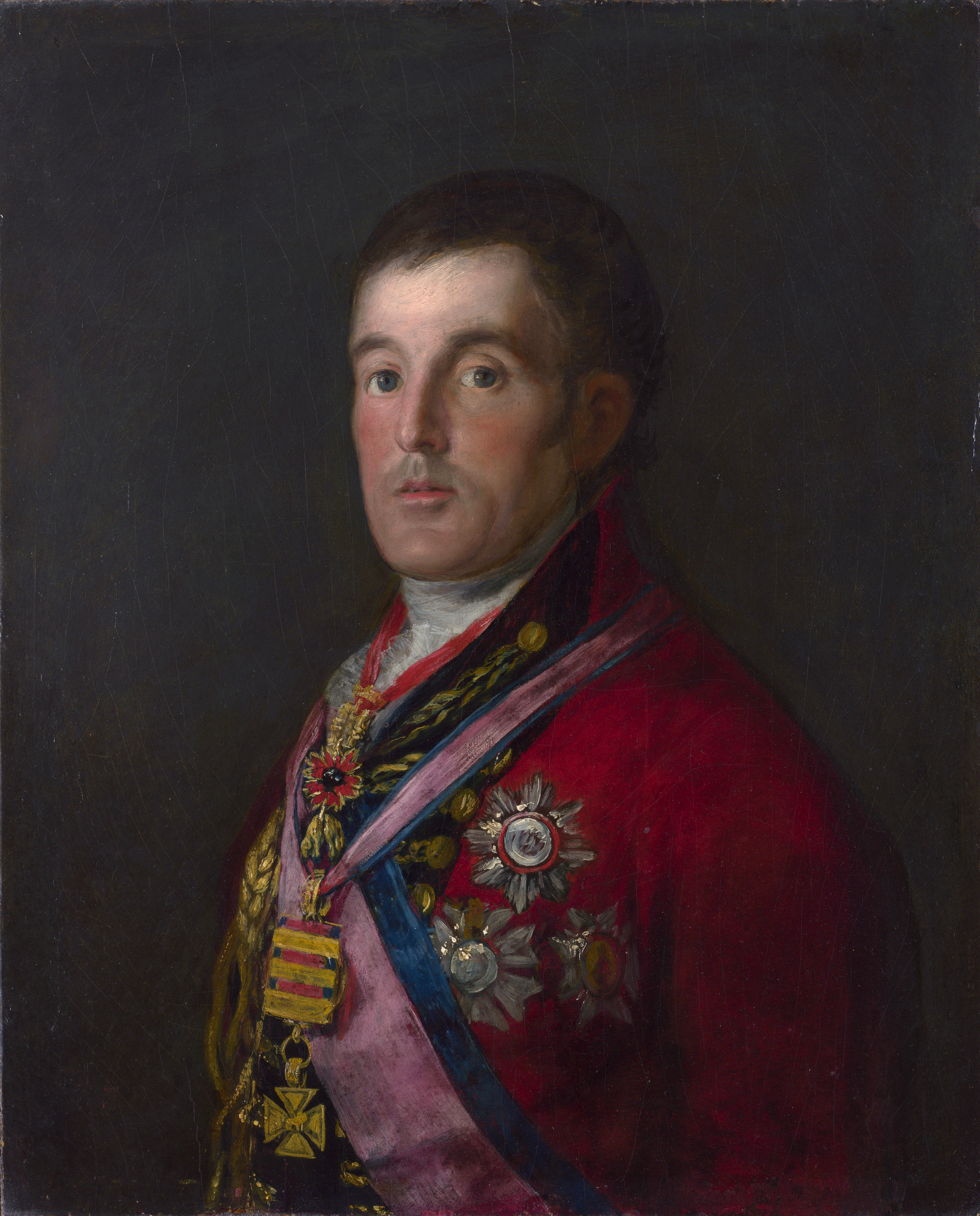
The Duke of Wellington by Francisco Goya, 1812–14

=== Victory: 1813–1814 ===
In 1813 Wellington led a new offensive, this time against the French line of communications. He struck through the hills north of Burgos, the Tras os Montes, and switched his supply line from Portugal to Santander on Spain's north coast; this led to the French abandoning Madrid and Burgos. Continuing to outflank the French lines, Wellington caught up with and routed the army of King Joseph Bonaparte in the Battle of Vitoria, for which he was promoted to field marshal on 21 June. He personally led a column against the French centre, while other columns commanded by Sir Thomas Graham, Rowland Hill and the Earl of Dalhousie looped around the French right and left (this battle became the subject of Beethoven's orchestral piece Wellington's Victory (Opus 91). The British troops broke ranks to loot the abandoned French wagons instead of pursuing the beaten foe. When troops failed to return to their units and began harassing the locals, an enraged Wellington wrote in a now famous despatch to Earl Bathurst, "We have in the service the scum of the earth as common soldiers".

Although later, when his temper had cooled, he extended his comment to praise the men under his command saying that though many of the men were, "the scum of the earth; it is really wonderful that we should have made them to the fine fellows they are".

After taking the small fortresses of Pamplona, Wellington invested San Sebastián but was frustrated by the obstinate French garrison, losing 693 dead and 316 captured in a failed assault and suspending the siege at the end of July. Soult's relief attempt was blocked by the Spanish Army of Galicia at San Marcial, allowing the Allies to consolidate their position and tighten the ring around the city, which fell in September after a second spirited defence. Wellington then forced Soult's demoralised and battered army into a fighting retreat into France, punctuated by battles at the Pyrenees, Bidassoa and Nivelle. Wellington invaded southern France, winning at the Nive and Orthez. Wellington's final battle against his rival Soult occurred at Toulouse, where the Allied divisions were badly mauled storming the French redoubts, losing some 4,600 men. Despite this momentary victory, news arrived of Napoleon's defeat and abdication and Soult, seeing no reason to continue the fighting, agreed on a ceasefire with Wellington, allowing Soult to evacuate the city.

Hailed as the conquering hero by the British, on 3 May 1814 Wellington was made Duke of Wellington, in the county of Somerset, together with the subsidiary title of Marquess Douro, in said County.

On 21 July 1814, the Prince Regent hosted a magnificent fête in Wellington's honour at Carlton House, attended by over 2,000 guests. The celebration was held in a temporary structure designed by John Nash—a 24-sided wooden rotunda with an innovative self-supporting roof that created a luminous, tent-like space for the festivities. The event marked the social pinnacle of Wellington's triumph, with the structure later being relocated to Woolwich Common to house the Royal Artillery Museum.

He received some recognition during his lifetime (the title of "Duque de Ciudad Rodrigo" and "Grandee of Spain") and the Spanish King Ferdinand VII allowed him to keep part of the works of art from the Royal Collection which he had recovered from the French. His equestrian portrait features prominently in the Monument to the Battle of Vitoria, in present-day Vitoria-Gasteiz.

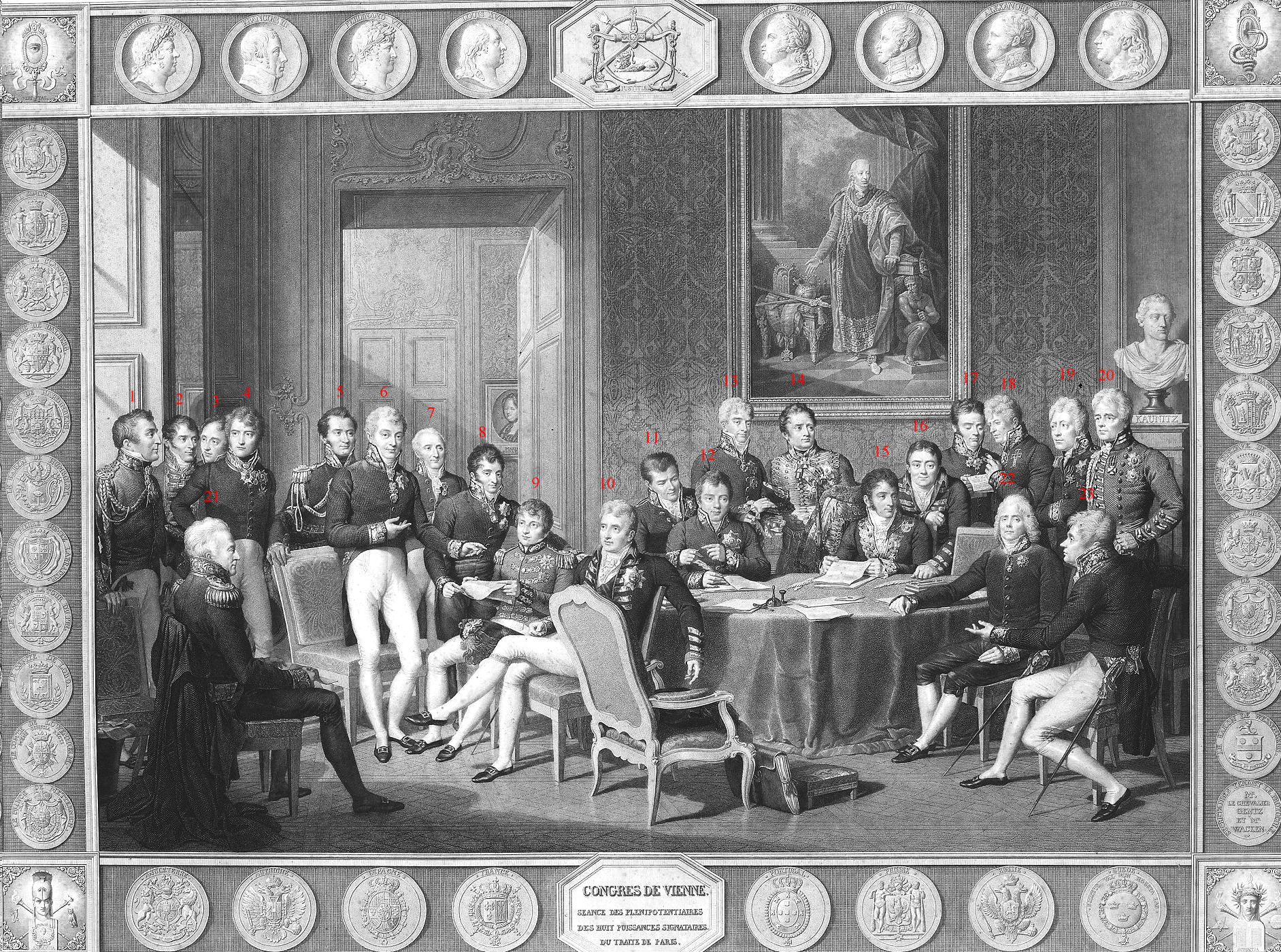
Wellington (far left) alongside Metternich, Talleyrand and other European diplomats at the Congress of Vienna, 1815 (engraving after Jean-Baptiste Isabey)

His popularity in Britain was due to his image and appearance as well as his military triumphs. His victories fit well with the passion and intensity of the Romantic movement, with its emphasis on individuality. His personal style went on to influence the fashions in Britain at the time: his tall and lean figure, plumed black hat, and grand yet classic uniform with white trousers became very popular.

In late 1814 the Prime Minister wanted him to take command in Canada with the assignment of winning the War of 1812 against the United States. Wellesley replied that he would go to America, but he believed that he was needed more in Europe. He stated:

I think you have no right, from the state of war, to demand any concession of territory from America... You have not been able to carry it into the enemy's territory, notwithstanding your military success, and now undoubted military superiority, and have not even cleared your own territory on the point of attack. You cannot on any principle of equality in negotiation claim a cession of territory except in exchange for other advantages which you have in your power... Then if this reasoning be true, why stipulate for the uti possidetis? You can get no territory: indeed, the state of your military operations, however creditable, does not entitle you to demand any.

He was appointed Ambassador to France, then took Lord Castlereagh's place as first plenipotentiary to the Congress of Vienna.

On 2 January 1815 the title of his Knighthood of the Bath was converted to Knight Grand Cross upon the expansion of that order.

== Hundred Days and aftermath: 1815–1818 ==
=== Facing Napoleon I ===
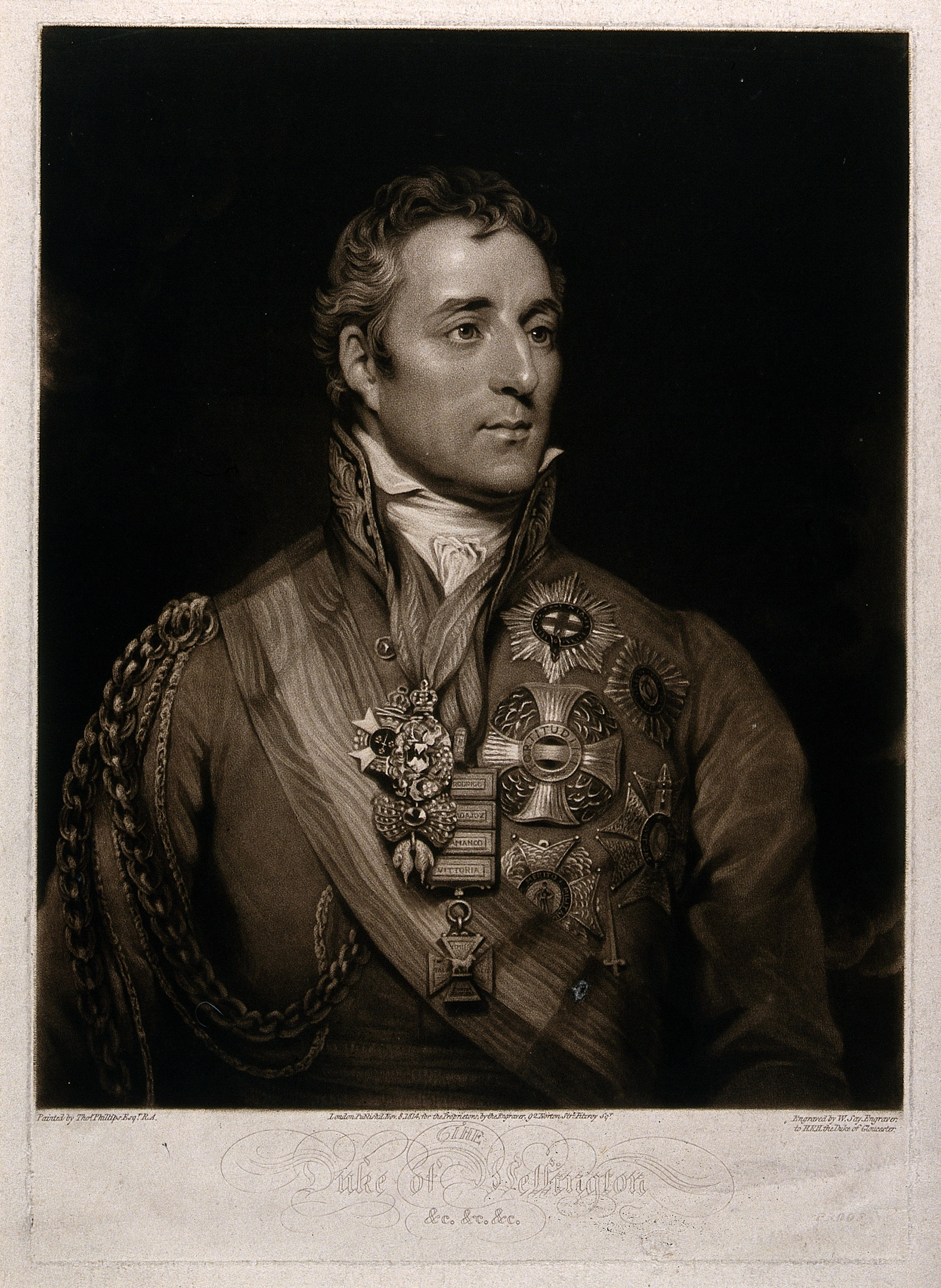
Engraving of Wellesley by William Say after Thomas Phillips

On 26 February 1815 Napoleon I escaped from Elba and returned to France. He regained control of the country by May and faced a renewed alliance against him. Wellington left Vienna for what became known as the Waterloo Campaign. He arrived in the Netherlands to take command of the British-German army and their allied Dutch, all stationed alongside the Prussian forces of Generalfeldmarschall Gebhard Leberecht von Blücher.

Napoleon's strategy was to isolate the Allied and Prussian armies and annihilate each one separately before the Austrians and Russians arrived. In doing so the vast superiority in numbers of the Coalition would be greatly diminished. He would then seek the possibility of peace with Austria and Russia.

The French invaded the Netherlands, with Napoleon I defeating the Prussians at the Battle of Ligny, and Marshal Ney engaging indecisively with Wellington at the Battle of Quatre Bras. The Prussians retreated 18 miles north to Wavre whilst Wellington's Anglo-Allied army withdrew 15 miles north to a site he had noted the previous year as favourable for a battle: the north ridge of a shallow valley on the Brussels road, just south of the small Belgian town of Waterloo. On 17 June there was torrential rain, which severely hampered movement. and had a considerable effect the next day, 18 June, when the Battle of Waterloo was fought. This was the first time Wellington had encountered Napoleon I; he commanded an Anglo-Dutch-German army that consisted of approximately 73,000 troops, 26,000 of whom were British. Approximately 30 per cent of that 26,000 were Irish.

=== Battle of Waterloo ===
The Battle of Waterloo was fought on Sunday 18 June 1815, near Waterloo (at that time in the United Kingdom of the Netherlands, now in Belgium). It commenced with a diversionary attack on Hougoumont by a division of French soldiers. After a barrage of 80 cannons, the first French infantry attack was launched by Comte D'Erlon's I Corps. D'Erlon's troops advanced through the Allied centre, resulting in Allied troops in front of the ridge retreating in disorder through the main position. D'Erlon's corps stormed the most fortified Allied position, La Haye Sainte, but failed to take it. An Allied division under Thomas Picton met the remainder of D'Erlon's corps head to head, engaging them in an infantry duel in which Picton was killed. During this struggle Lord Uxbridge launched two of his cavalry brigades at the enemy, catching the French infantry off guard, driving them to the bottom of the slope, and capturing two French Imperial Eagles. The charge, however, over-reached itself, and the British cavalry, crushed by fresh French horsemen sent at them by Napoleon, were driven back, suffering tremendous losses.

Shortly before 16:00, Marshal Ney noted an apparent withdrawal from Wellington's centre. He mistook the movement of casualties to the rear for the beginnings of a retreat, and sought to exploit it. Ney at this time had few infantry reserves left, as most of the infantry had been committed either to the futile Hougoumont attack or to the defence of the French right. Ney, therefore, tried to break Wellington's centre with a cavalry charge alone.

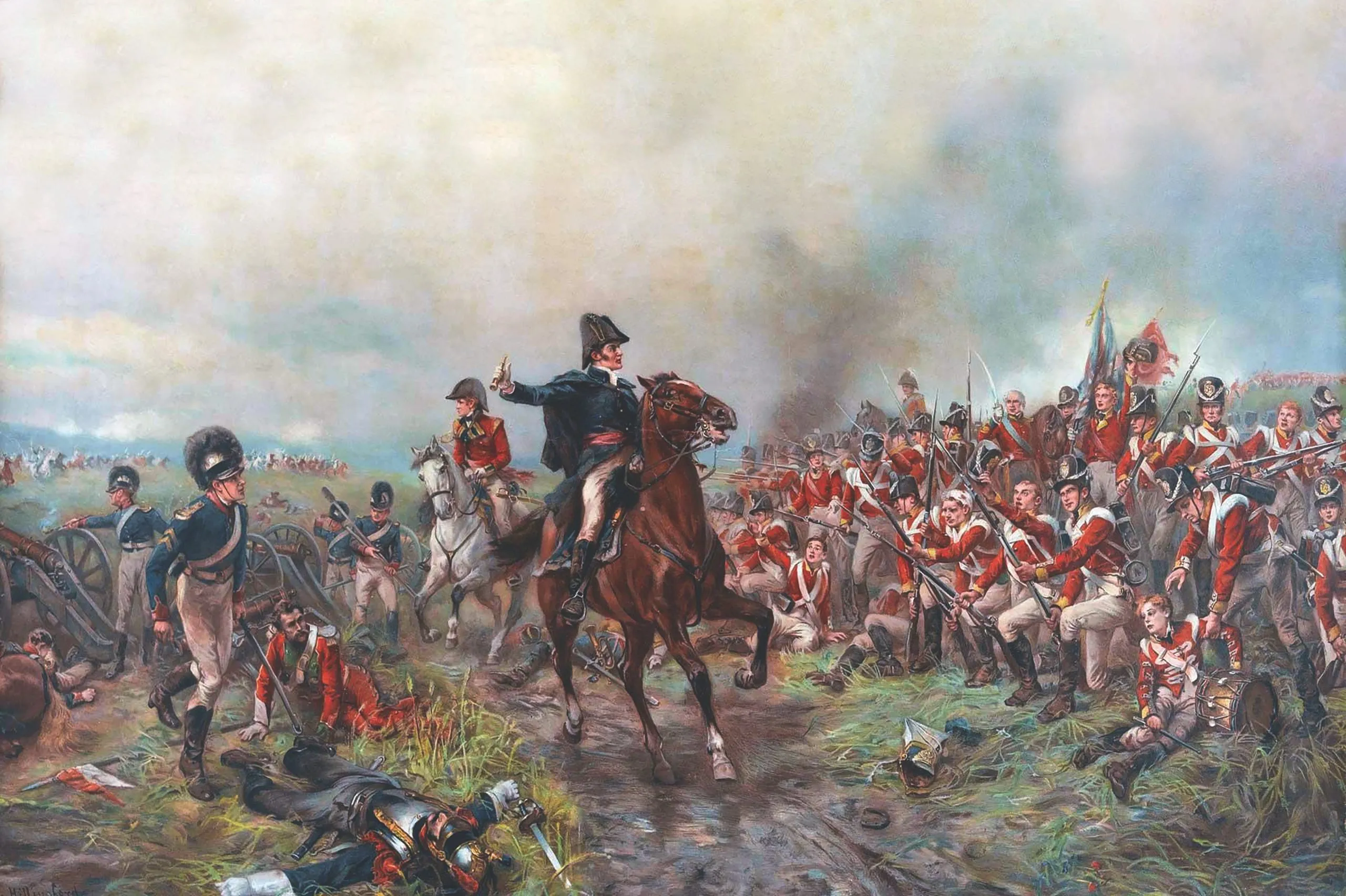
Wellington at Waterloo, by Robert Alexander Hillingford

At about 16:30, the first Prussian corps arrived. Commanded by Freiherr von Bülow, IV Corps arrived as the French cavalry attack was in full spate. Bülow sent the 15th Brigade to link up with Wellington's left flank in the Frichermont–La Haie area while the brigade's horse artillery battery and additional brigade artillery deployed to its left in support. Napoleon sent Georges Mouton's corps to intercept the rest of Bülow's IV Corps proceeding to Plancenoit. The 15th Brigade sent Lobau's corps into retreat to the Plancenoit area. Von Hiller's 16th Brigade also pushed forward with six battalions against Plancenoit. Napoleon had dispatched all eight battalions of the Young Guard to reinforce Lobau, who was now seriously pressed by the enemy. Napoleon's Young Guard counter-attacked and, after very hard fighting, secured Plancenoit, but were themselves counter-attacked and driven out. Napoleon then resorted to sending two battalions of the Middle and Old Guard into Plancenoit and after ferocious fighting they recaptured the village. The French cavalry attacked the British infantry squares many times, each at a heavy cost to the French but with few British casualties. Ney himself was displaced from his horse four times. Eventually, it became obvious, even to Ney, that cavalry alone were achieving little. Belatedly, he organised a combined-arms attack, using Bachelu's division and Tissot's regiment of Foy's division from Reille's II Corps plus those French cavalry that remained in a fit state to fight. This assault was directed along much the same route as the previous heavy cavalry attacks.

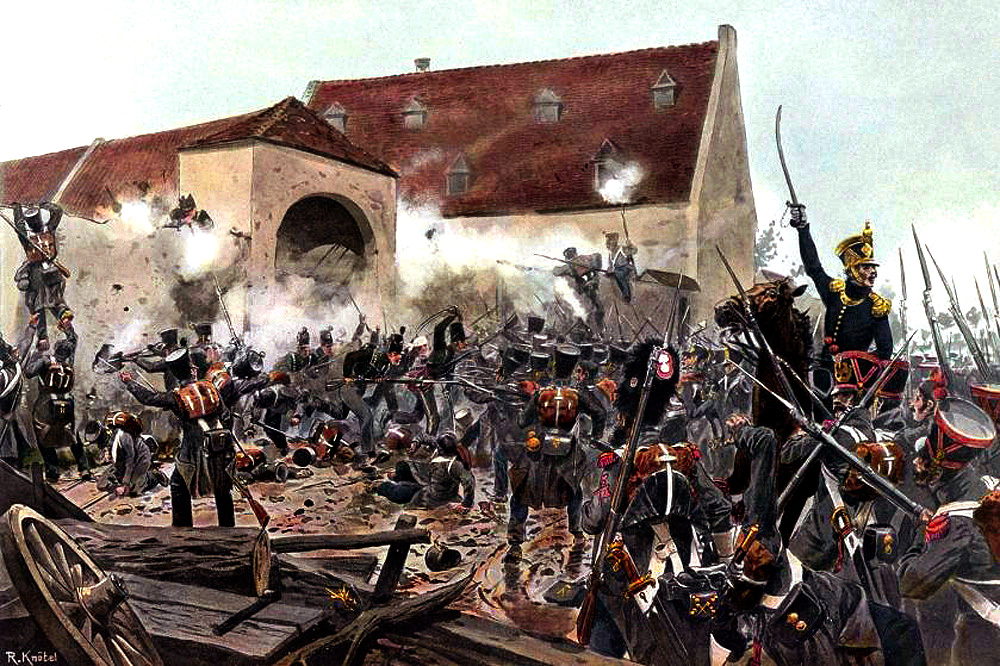
The storming of La Haye Sainte, by Richard Knötel

Meanwhile, at approximately the same time as Ney's combined-arms assault on the centre-right of Wellington's line, Napoleon ordered Ney to capture La Haye Sainte at whatever the cost. Ney accomplished this with what was left of D'Erlon's corps soon after 18:00. Ney then moved horse artillery up towards Wellington's centre and began to attack the infantry squares at short-range with canister. This all but destroyed the 27th (Inniskilling) Regiment, and the 30th and 73rd Regiments suffered such heavy losses that they had to combine to form a viable square. Wellington's centre was now on the verge of collapse and wide open to an attack from the French. Luckily for Wellington, Pirch I's and Hans Ernst Karl, Graf von Zieten's corps of the Prussian Army were now at hand. Zieten's corps permitted the two fresh cavalry brigades of Vivian and Vandeleur on Wellington's extreme left to be moved and posted behind the depleted centre. Pirch I Corps then proceeded to support Bülow and together they regained possession of Plancenoit, and once more the Charleroi road was swept by Prussian round shot. The value of this reinforcement is held in high regard.

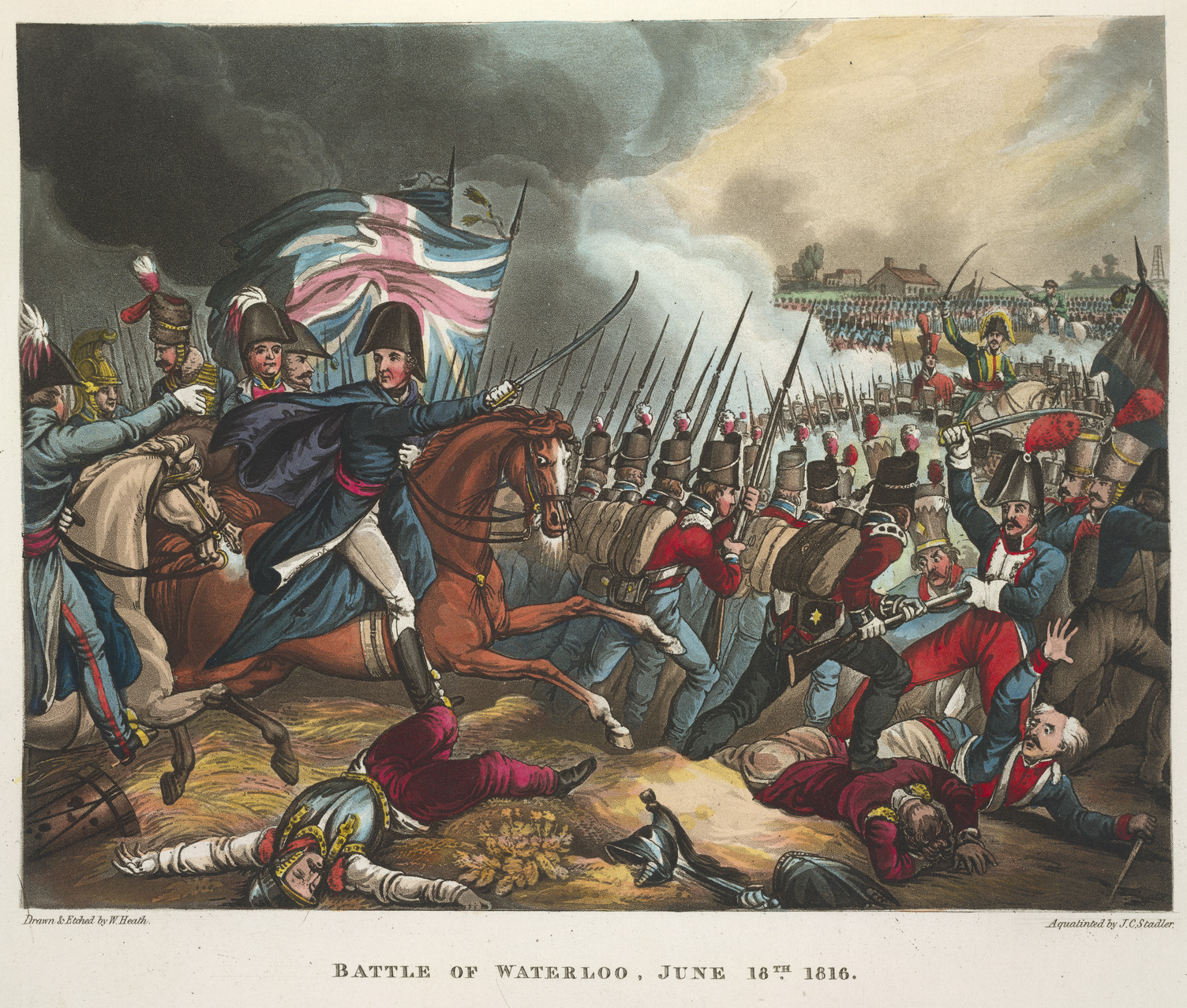
Wellington at the Battle of Waterloo

The French army now fiercely attacked the Coalition all along the line with the culminating point being reached when Napoleon sent forward the Imperial Guard at 19:30. The attack of the Imperial Guards was mounted by five battalions of the Middle Guard, and not by the Grenadiers or Chasseurs of the Old Guard. Marching through a hail of canister and skirmisher fire and severely outnumbered, the 3,000 or so Middle Guardsmen advanced to the west of La Haye Sainte and proceeded to separate into three distinct attack forces. One, consisting of two battalions of Grenadiers, defeated the Coalition's first line and marched on. David Hendrik Chassé's relatively fresh Dutch division was sent against them, and Allied artillery fired into the victorious Grenadiers' flank. This still could not stop the Guard's advance, so Chassé ordered his first brigade to charge the outnumbered French, who faltered and broke.

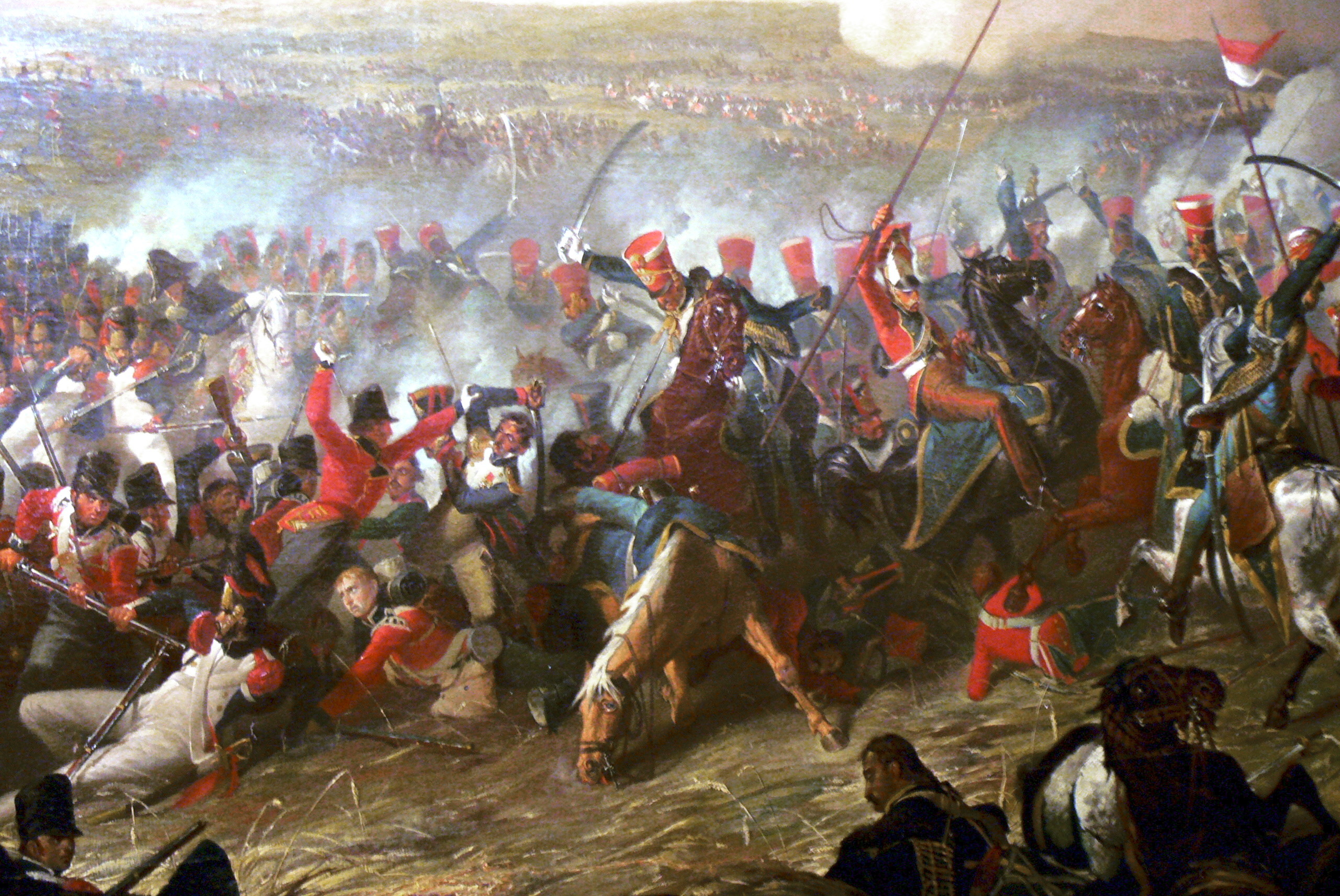
British 10th Hussars of Vivian's Brigade (red shakos – blue uniforms) attacking mixed French troops, including a square of Guard grenadiers (left, middle distance) in the final stages of the battle

Further to the west, 1,500 British Foot Guards under Peregrine Maitland were lying down to protect themselves from the French artillery. As two battalions of Chasseurs approached, the second prong of the Imperial Guard's attack, Maitland's guardsmen rose and devastated them with point-blank volleys. The Chasseurs deployed to counter-attack but began to waver. A bayonet charge by the Foot Guards then broke them. The third prong, a fresh Chasseur battalion, now came up in support. The British guardsmen retreated with these Chasseurs in pursuit, but the latter were halted as the 52nd Light Infantry wheeled in line onto their flank and poured a devastating fire into them and then charged. Under this onslaught, they too broke.

The last of the Guard retreated headlong. Mass panic ensued through the French lines as the news spread: "La Garde recule. Sauve qui peut!" ("The Guard is retreating. Every man for himself!"). Wellington then stood up in Copenhagen's stirrups, and waved his hat in the air to signal an advance of the Allied line just as the Prussians were overrunning the French positions to the east. What remained of the French army then abandoned the field in disorder. Wellington and Blücher met at the inn of La Belle Alliance, on the north–south road which bisected the battlefield, and it was agreed that the Prussians should pursue the retreating French army back to France. The Treaty of Paris was signed on 20 November 1815.

After the victory, the Duke supported proposals that a medal be awarded to all British soldiers who participated in the Waterloo campaign, and on 28 June 1815 he wrote to the Duke of York and Albany suggesting:

... the expediency of giving to the non-commissioned officers and soldiers engaged in the Battle of Waterloo a medal. I am convinced it would have the best effect in the army, and if the battle should settle our concerns, they will well deserve it.

The Waterloo Medal was duly authorised and distributed to all ranks in 1816.

=== Controversy ===
Much historical discussion has been made about Napoleon's decision to send 33,000 troops under Marshal Emmanuel de Grouchy to intercept the Prussians, but—having defeated Blücher at Ligny on 16 June and forced the Allies to retreat in divergent directions—Napoleon may have been strategically astute in a judgement that he would have been unable to beat the combined Allied forces on one battlefield. Wellington's comparable strategic gamble was to leave 17,000 troops and artillery, mostly Dutch, 8.1 mi (13.0 km) away at Hal, north-west of Mont-Saint-Jean, in case of a French advance up the Mons-Hal-Brussels road.

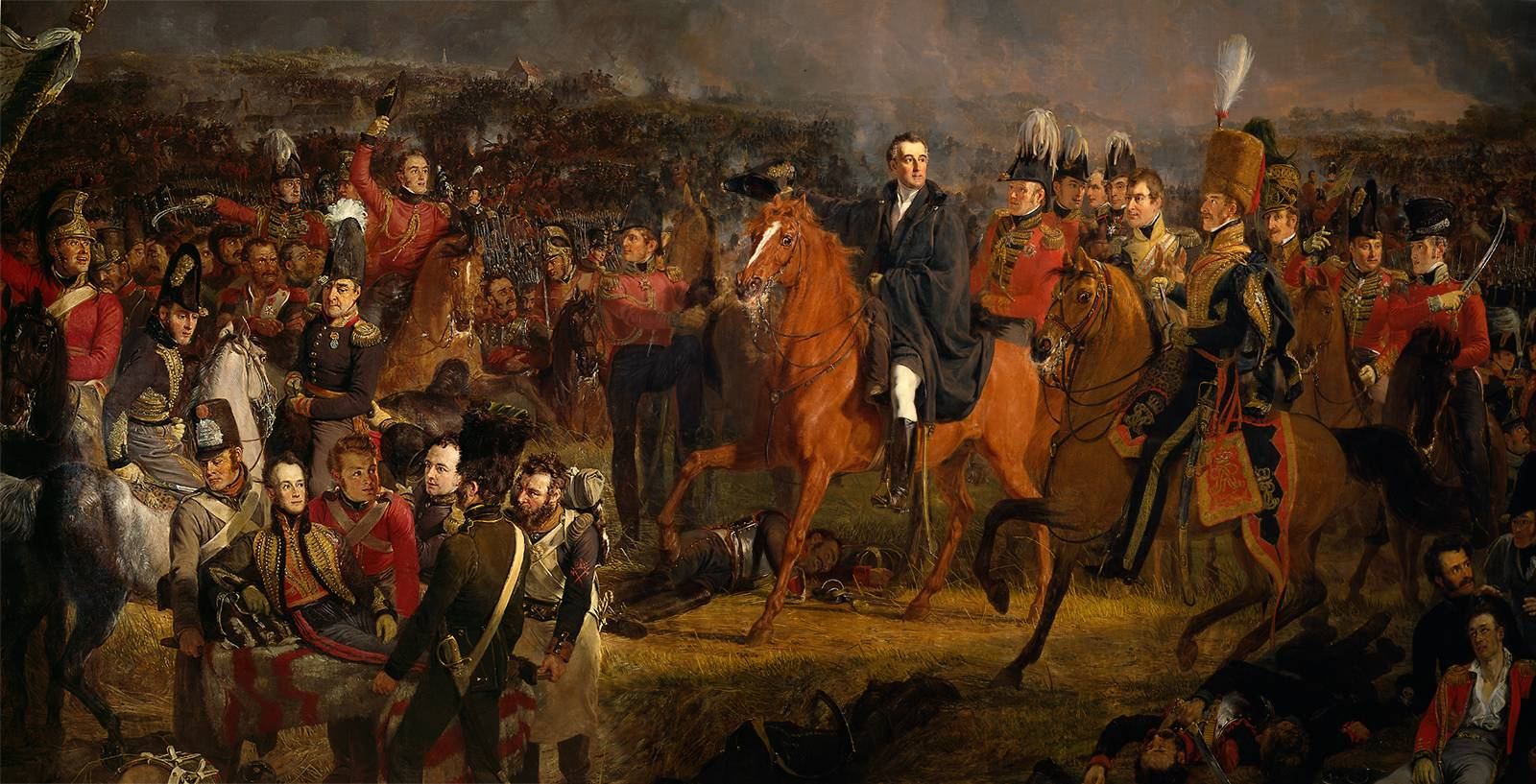
Wellington at the battle of Waterloo. Detail of The Battle of Waterloo by Jan Willem Pieneman, 1824.

The campaign led to numerous other controversies. Issues concerning Wellington's troop dispositions prior to Napoleon's invasion of the Netherlands, whether Wellington misled or betrayed Blücher by promising, then failing, to come directly to Blücher's aid at Ligny, and credit for the victory between Wellington and the Prussians. These and other such issues concerning Blücher's, Wellington's, and Napoleon's decisions during the campaign were the subject of a strategic-level study by the Prussian political-military theorist Carl von Clausewitz, Feldzug von 1815: Strategische Uebersicht des Feldzugs von 1815 (English title: The Campaign of 1815: Strategic Overview of the Campaign). (Note: see Bassford, Moran & Pedlow (2010) for details..) This study was Clausewitz's last such work and is widely considered to be the best example of Clausewitz's mature theories concerning such analyses. It attracted the attention of Wellington's staff, who prompted the Duke to write a published essay on the campaign (other than his immediate, official after-action report, "The Waterloo Dispatch".) This was published as the 1842 "Memorandum on the Battle of Waterloo". While Wellington disputed Clausewitz on several points, Clausewitz largely absolved Wellington of accusations levelled against him. This exchange with Clausewitz was quite famous in Britain in the 19th century, particularly in Charles Cornwallis Chesney's work the Waterloo Lectures, but was largely ignored in the 20th century due to hostilities between Britain and Germany.

=== Army of occupation in Paris ===
Under the terms of the Treaty of Paris, Wellington was appointed commander of the multi-national army of occupation based in Paris, France. The army consisted of troops from various countries, including the United Kingdom, Austria, Russia and Prussia, along with contributions from five other smaller European countries. Although the various contingents were administered by their own commanders, they were all subordinate to Wellington, who was also responsible for liaison with the French administration. The role of the army was to prevent a resurgence of French revolutionary aggression and to allow the restored King Louis XVIII to consolidate his control over the country. The army of occupation was never required to intervene militarily and was dissolved in 1818, after which Wellington returned to Britain. It was his last active military command.

== Early political career: 1818–1828 ==
=== Cabinet minister under Lord Liverpool: 1818–1827 ===
In 1818, the prime minister Lord Liverpool invited Wellington to take up the position of Master-General of the Ordnance in his ministry, a position that the Earl of Mulgrave offered to relinquish in Wellington's favour. In accepting the position, Wellington stated that, though attached to the Tory party currently in government, he would not be willing to follow the party into opposition, and Liverpool accepted this, recognising Wellington's special position as a national figure. After taking up the position on 26 December 1818, Wellington remained Master-General of the Ordnance for over eight years, and during this period he greatly increased the efficiency of the Board of Ordnance, as well as preparing a comprehensive plan for the defence of Canada and supporting the establishment of the Ordnance Survey of Ireland. Wellington was also Governor of Plymouth from 9 October 1819.

As a member of the cabinet, Wellington also played an important role in foreign policy. In common with the foreign secretary Lord Castlereagh, Wellington was dismayed by the liberal revolutions of 1820 in Spain and Naples, but shared his opposition to intervention by the Holy Alliance in the affairs of other countries, and so considered it unfortunate that the allies decided to undertake such an approach at the Congress of Troppau in 1820. Following Castlereagh's suicide in August 1822, King George IV was in favour of Wellington taking his place as foreign secretary, but Wellington was not eager to take a position that would make him a party-political figure, and in any case Liverpool preferred to appoint George Canning, an arrangement which the King reluctantly accepted after consulting Wellington. Wellington took Castlereagh's place at the Congress of Verona that autumn, representing the British government in strongly opposing the proposed French intervention in Spain, which the other major European powers agreed to support.

Wellington quickly grew frustrated with Canning's management of foreign policy, favouring a more conciliatory approach towards the continental powers, whereas Canning unsuccessfully attempted to deter the French invasion of Spain through impracticable threats of war. Wellington was also annoyed by Canning's unwillingness to send troops to support King John VI of Portugal and his moderate minister the Marquis of Palmela in restoring order following the absolutist coup that overthrew the liberal regime there in May 1823, and again following another attempted absolutist coup in April 1824. Wellington also disagreed with Canning over trade policy with South America, objecting to Canning's readiness to recognise the revolutionary governments that had recently overthrown Spanish rule there.

Following the death of Emperor Alexander I of Russia, Wellington went to Russia to attend the late emperor's funeral and to discuss foreign policy with the new emperor Nicholas I, arriving in St Petersburg on 2 March 1826. With the aim of reducing the chance of war between Russia and the Ottoman Empire, he attempted to reduce the severity of an ultimatum that the Russians were about to present to the Turks, and negotiated the Protocol of St Petersburg, which set out a plan to resolve the Greek War of Independence through Anglo-Russian mediation. Later that year, when Canning decided to send an expeditionary force to support the liberal regime that had been established in Portugal in the name of the child queen Maria II following the death of John VI, Wellington played a role in arranging the force of around 5,000 men that was despatched to Lisbon in December 1826 under Sir William Clinton, and in justifying the expedition in the House of Lords.

After the death of the Duke of York, Wellington was appointed Commander-in-Chief of the British Army on 22 January 1827, since it was generally accepted that his military eminence made him the only candidate who could be decently appointed. He was also appointed Constable of the Tower of London on 5 February 1827.

=== Out of government under Canning and Goderich: 1827–1828 ===
Following the retirement of Lord Liverpool after a major stroke in February 1827, Canning was invited to form a new government by the King in April. In response to letters from Canning that invited him to remain in the government but caused him offence, Wellington refused to serve under Canning, and also wrote to the King to resign his position as Commander-in-Chief. When Parliament resumed in May, Robert Peel made a speech in the Commons justifying the conduct of the ministers who had resigned, and Wellington gave an effective speech in the Lords to the same effect, sitting on the cross benches along with the other former ministers who had refused to serve under Canning, namely Lords Eldon, Bathurst, Melville, Westmorland, and Bexley.

After the death of Canning in August and his replacement by Lord Goderich, Wellington agreed to resume his position as Commander-in-Chief, since his objection had always been to Canning personally, but his interaction with the government was limited to official business and did not represent a reconciliation with the ministry.

== Prime Minister: 1828–1830 ==
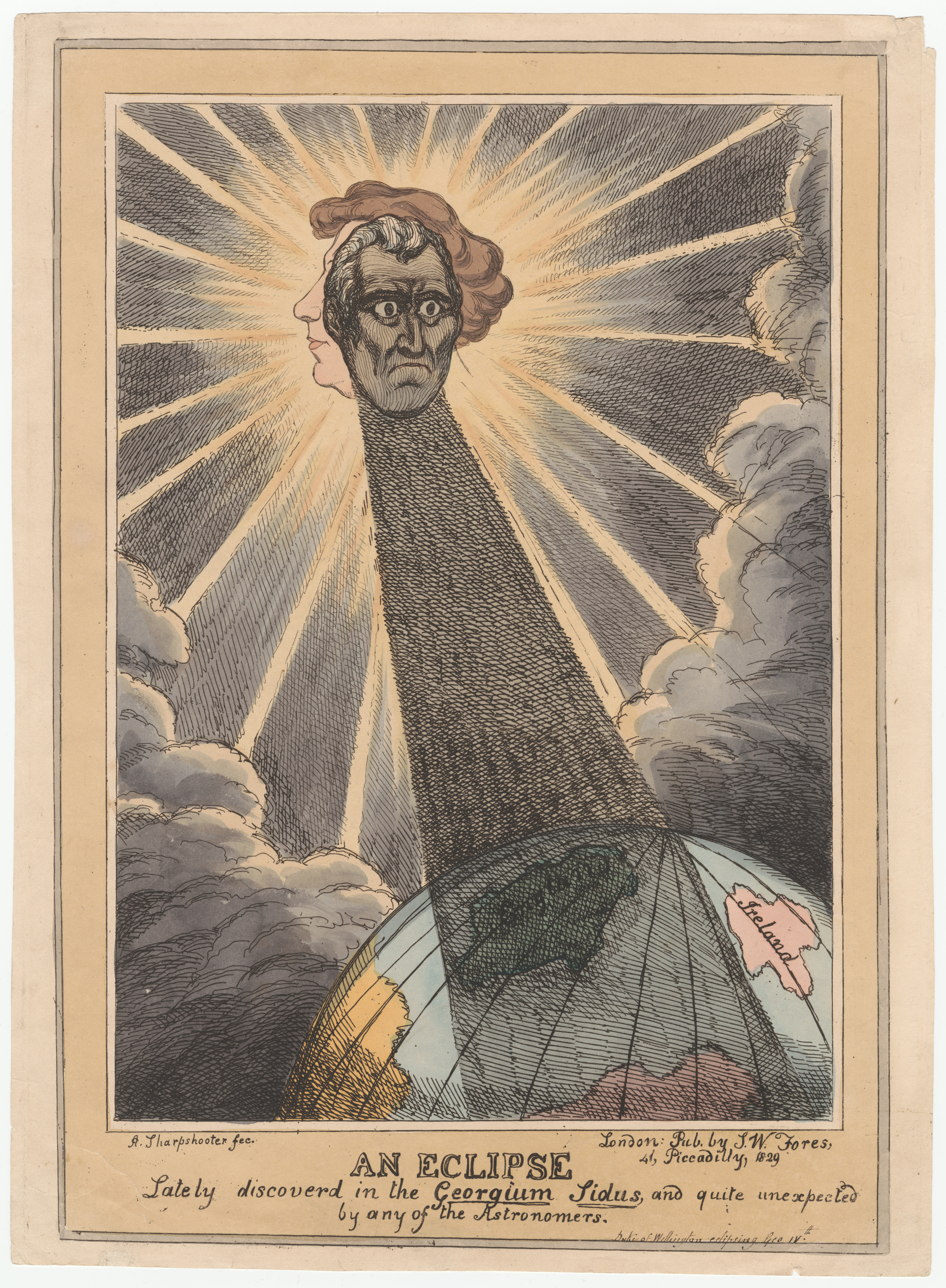
A cartoon attacking Wellington, then prime minister, for the April 1829 Roman Catholic Relief Act. He is portrayed as the moon eclipsing the Sun (George IV) and casting a shadow over Protestant Britain but not Catholic Ireland

=== Appointment ===
After accepting Goderich's resignation as Prime Minister on 8 January 1828, the King summoned Wellington to Windsor on the morning of 9 January and invited him to form a government. Wellington first secured the co-operation of Robert Peel, whose authority in the House of Commons would be essential, and proceeded to establish a cabinet that included not only members of the Liverpool ministry, but also several members of the ministry of Canning and Goderich, including William Huskisson, Charles Grant and Lords Dudley and Palmerston. Although Wellington wished to remain Commander-in-Chief, there was a widespread public opinion that he should not hold both positions simultaneously, and he placed the matter in the hands of his cabinet, which agreed (in a meeting held in his absence) that he should give up the position of Commander-in-Chief.

There were considerable disagreements in the new cabinet between Wellington and the former Canningites, especially over the Greek War of Independence and the issues of corn and parliamentary reform, culminating in the resignation of Huskisson in May 1828, followed by Dudley, Palmerston and Grant. The resulting reshuffle produced a cabinet that had a less broad base of support, but was also more compact and politically united.

During his first seven months as prime minister, Wellington chose not to live in the official residence at 10 Downing Street, finding it too small. He moved in only because his own home, Apsley House, required extensive renovations. During this time he was largely instrumental in the foundation of King's College London. On 20 January 1829 Wellington was appointed Lord Warden of the Cinque Ports.

=== Catholic emancipation ===
Ireland presented his first major challenge. In July 1828 William Vesey Fitzgerald, President of the Board of Trade, was defeated in a County Clare by-election by the champion of Catholic emancipation, Daniel O'Connell. The electoral upset dramatised the issue of the Oath of Supremacy – the sacramental test that effectively barred Roman Catholics from Parliament (denying O'Connell his seat) and from higher offices of the judiciary and state.

While an MP in the Irish Parliament, Wellington had broadly favoured relieving Catholics of their Penal Law disabilities. Following the rebellions of 1798 and 1803, in which France had colluded, he grew more cautious, suggesting that if political distinctions between Protestants and the Catholic were abolished "all will be Irishmen alike", equally anxious to secure their country's independence. However, in the willingness of Ireland's enfranchised forty-shilling freeholders to defy their landlords and vote for emancipation candidates, Wellington recognised a "vast demonstration of populist political organisation, and clerical power" more challenging than a separatist conspiracy.

Along with Peel, who had served as Chief Secretary for Ireland, Wellington was persuaded of the need for a new Oath of Allegiance unexceptional to Catholics. In the face of stiff opposition from the King and in the Lords, he forced the issue by threatening to resign, which would have cleared the way for a new Whig majority with designs not only on emancipation but also on parliamentary reform. The King and his brother, the Duke of Cumberland, did seek to put together a ministry united against Catholic emancipation. But recognising that such a government could not command a majority in the Commons, they soon abandoned the attempt.

For the Roman Catholic Relief Act 1829 (passed with Whig support) O'Connell accorded Wellington little credit. The Duke was no Irish patriot: "To be sure he was born in Ireland", the "Emancipator" famously remarked, "but to be born in a stable does not make a man a horse". This quip was widely reported and frequently attributed, mistakenly, to Wellington himself.

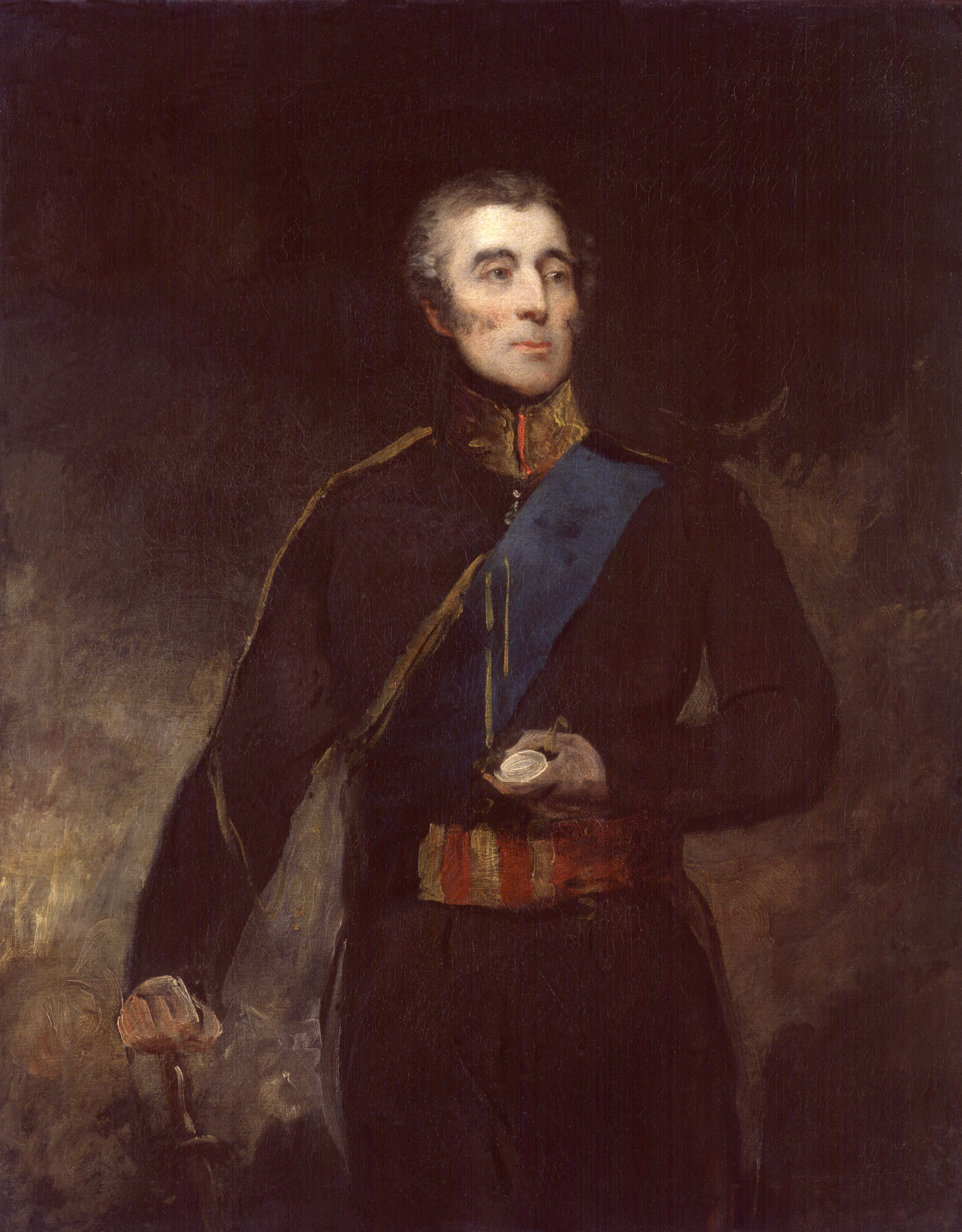
Portrait of the Duke of Wellington by John Jackson, 1830–31

Wellington's government did exact a significant price for emancipation. The Relief Act was accompanied by a restriction of the Irish franchise. The property threshold for the county vote was raised five-fold to the British ten-pound standard, disenfranchising O'Connell's forty-shilling freeholders, and with them the greater part of the Irish electorate.

It was in this context that Wellington became the second and last prime minister to fight a duel, the Wellington–Winchilsea duel. An opponent of emancipation, the Earl of Winchilsea, accused Wellington of "an insidious design for the infringement of our liberties and the introduction of Popery into every department of the State". Wellington responded by immediately challenging Winchilsea to a duel. On 21 March 1829, Wellington and Winchilsea met on Battersea fields. When the time came to fire, the Duke took aim and Winchilsea kept his arm down. The Duke fired wide to the right. Accounts differ as to whether he missed on purpose, an act known in duelling as a delope. Wellington claimed he did. However, he was noted for his poor aim and reports more sympathetic to Winchilsea claimed he had aimed to kill. Winchilsea discharged his pistol into the air, a plan he and his second had almost certainly decided upon before the duel. Honour was saved and Winchilsea wrote Wellington an apology.

The nickname "Iron Duke" originated from this period, when he experienced a high degree of personal and political unpopularity. Its repeated use in Freeman's Journal throughout June 1830 appears to bear reference to his resolute political will, with taints of disapproval from its Irish editors. During this time, Wellington was greeted by a hostile reaction from the crowds at the opening of the Liverpool and Manchester Railway.

=== Resignation and aftermath ===
Wellington's government fell in 1830. In the summer and autumn of that year, a wave of riots swept the country. The Whigs had been out of power for most years since the 1770s, and saw political reform in response to the unrest as the key to their return. Wellington stuck to the Tory policy of no reform and no expansion of suffrage, and as a result, lost a vote of no confidence on 15 November 1830.

== Later political career: 1830–1852 ==
=== In opposition: 1830–1834 ===
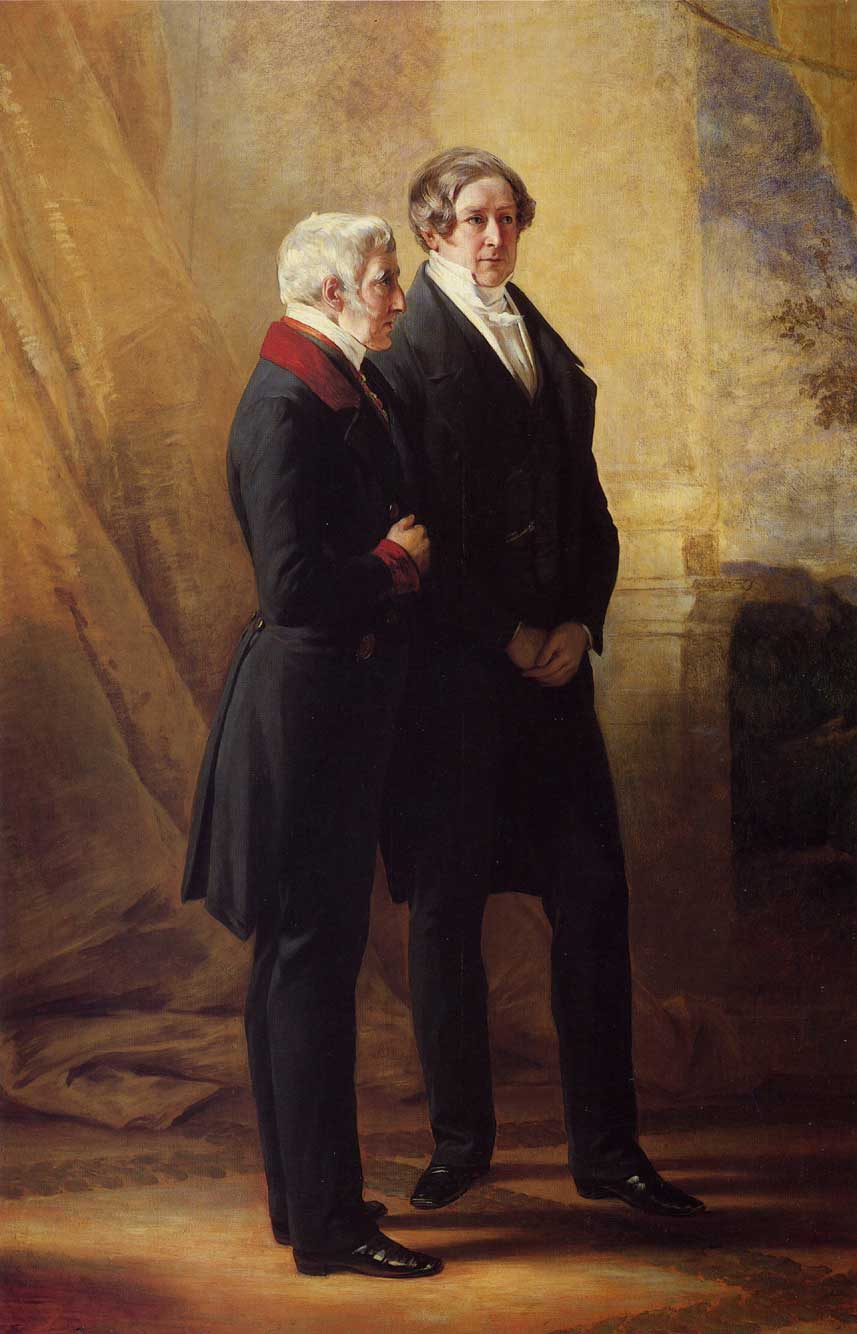
The Duke of Wellington and Sir Robert Peel, 1844, by Franz Xaver Winterhalter

The Whigs introduced a Reform Bill while Wellington and the Tories worked to prevent its passage. The Whigs could not get the bill past its second reading in the British House of Commons, and the attempt failed. An election followed in direct response and the Whigs were returned with a landslide majority. A second Reform Bill was introduced and passed in the House of Commons but was defeated in the Tory-controlled House of Lords. Another wave of near-insurrection swept the country. Wellington's residence at Apsley House was targeted by a mob of demonstrators on 27 April 1831 and again on 12 October, leaving his windows smashed. Iron shutters were installed in June 1832 to prevent further damage by crowds angry over rejection of the Reform Bill, which he strongly opposed. The Whig Government fell in 1832 and Wellington was unable to form a Tory Government partly because of a run on the Bank of England. This left King William IV no choice but to restore Earl Grey to the premiership. Eventually, the bill passed the House of Lords after the king threatened to fill that House with newly created Whig peers if it were not. Wellington was never reconciled to the change; when Parliament first met after the first election under the widened franchise, Wellington is reported to have said "I never saw so many shocking bad hats in my life".

Wellington opposed the Jewish Civil Disabilities Repeal Bill, and he stated in Parliament on 1 August 1833 that England "is a Christian country and a Christian legislature, and that the effect of this measure would be to remove that peculiar character." The bill was defeated by 104 votes to 54.

Wellington's wife Kitty died of cancer in 1831; despite their generally unhappy relations, which had led to an effective separation, Wellington was said to have been greatly saddened by her death, his one comfort being that after "half a lifetime together, they had come to understand each other at the end". He had found consolation for his unhappy marriage in his warm friendship with the diarist Harriet Arbuthnot, wife of his colleague Charles Arbuthnot. Harriet's death in the cholera epidemic of 1834 was almost as great a blow to Wellington as it was to her husband. The two widowers spent their last years together at Apsley House.

=== Caretaker ministry and afterwards: 1834–1846 ===
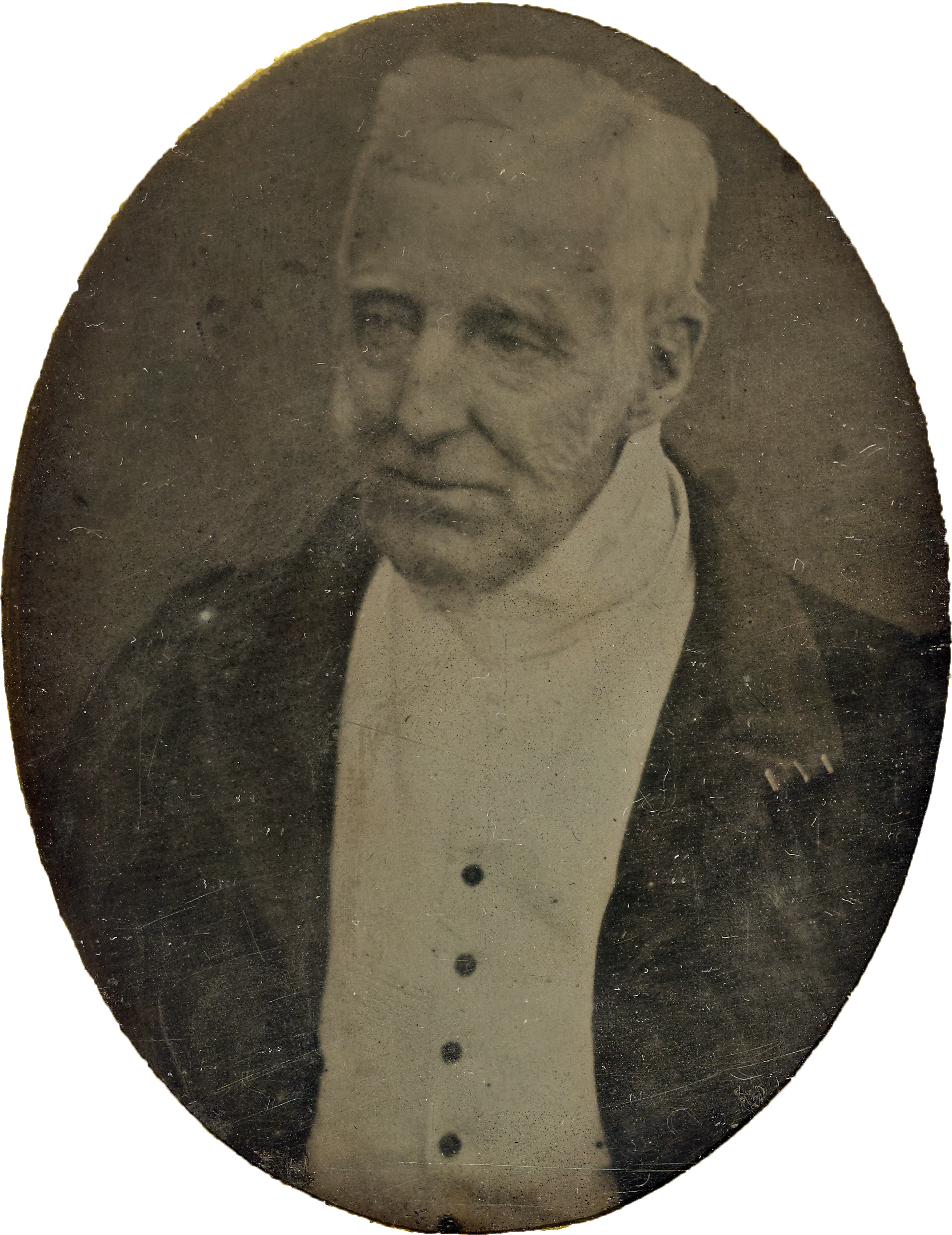
Daguerreotype by Antoine Claudet depicting an elderly Wellington (1844)

Wellington was gradually superseded as leader of the Tories by Robert Peel, while the party evolved into the Conservatives. When the Tories were returned to power in 1834, Wellington declined to become prime minister because he thought membership in the House of Commons had become essential. The king reluctantly approved Peel, who was in Italy. Hence, Wellington acted as interim leader for three weeks in November and December 1834, taking the responsibilities of prime minister and most of the other ministries. In Peel's first cabinet (1834–1835), Wellington became foreign secretary, while in the second (1841–1846) he was a minister without portfolio and Leader of the House of Lords. Wellington was also re-appointed Commander-in-Chief of the British Army on 15 August 1842 following the resignation of Lord Hill.

Wellington served as the leader of the Conservative party in the House of Lords from 1828 to 1846. Some historians have belittled him as a befuddled reactionary, but a consensus in the late 20th century depicts him as a shrewd operator who hid his cleverness behind the façade of a poorly informed old soldier. Wellington worked to transform the Lords from unstinting support of the Crown to an active player in political manoeuvering, with a commitment to the landed aristocracy. He used his London residence as a venue for intimate dinners and private consultations, together with extensive correspondence that kept him in close touch with party leaders in the Commons, and the main persona in the Lords. He gave public rhetorical support to Ultra-Tory anti-reform positions, but then deftly changed positions toward the party's centre, especially when Peel needed support from the upper house. Wellington's success was based on the 44 elected representative peers from Scotland and Ireland, whose elections he controlled.

=== Retirement: 1846–1852 ===
Wellington retired from political life in 1846, although he remained Commander-in-Chief, and returned briefly to the public eye in 1848 when he helped organise a military force to protect London during the year of European revolution. The Conservative Party had split over the repeal of the Corn Laws in 1846, with Wellington and most of the former Cabinet still supporting Peel, but most of the MPs led by Lord Derby supporting a protectionist stance. Early in 1852 Wellington, by then very deaf, gave Derby's first government its nickname by shouting "Who? Who?" as the list of inexperienced Cabinet ministers was read out in the House of Lords. He became Chief Ranger and Keeper of Hyde Park and St James's Park on 31 August 1850. He remained colonel of the 33rd Regiment of Foot from 1 February 1806 and colonel of the Grenadier Guards from 22 January 1827.

From 1834 until his death in 1852, Wellington served as Chancellor of the University of Oxford.

== Death and funeral ==
The memorial to Wellington in St Paul's Cathedral

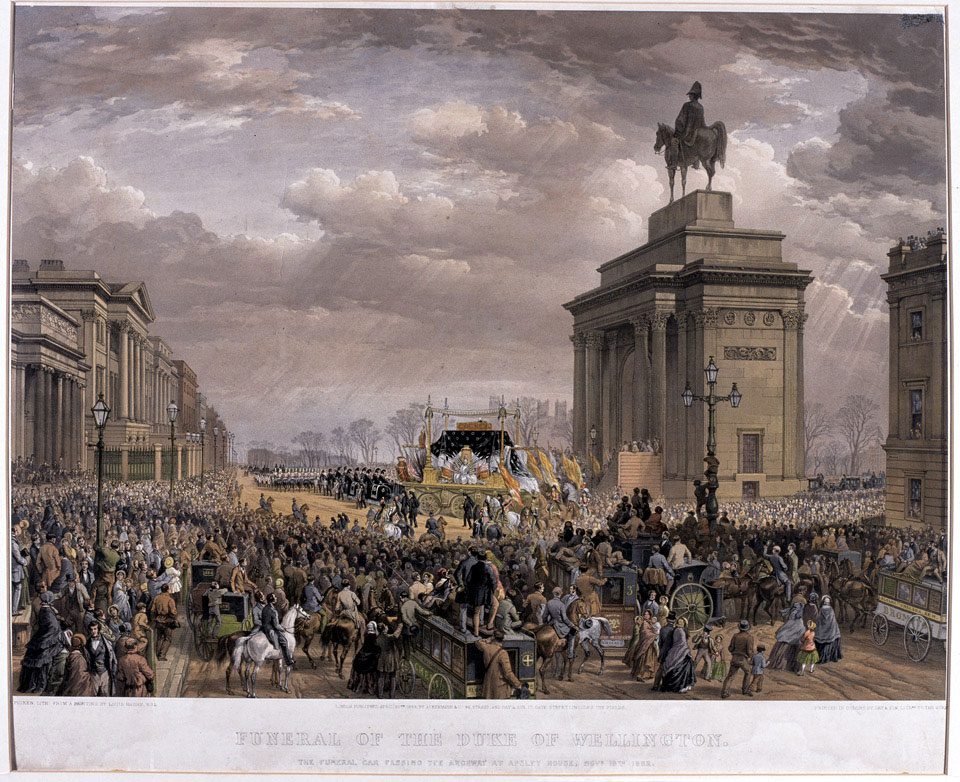
Wellesley's funeral procession passing Wellington Arch and Apsley House

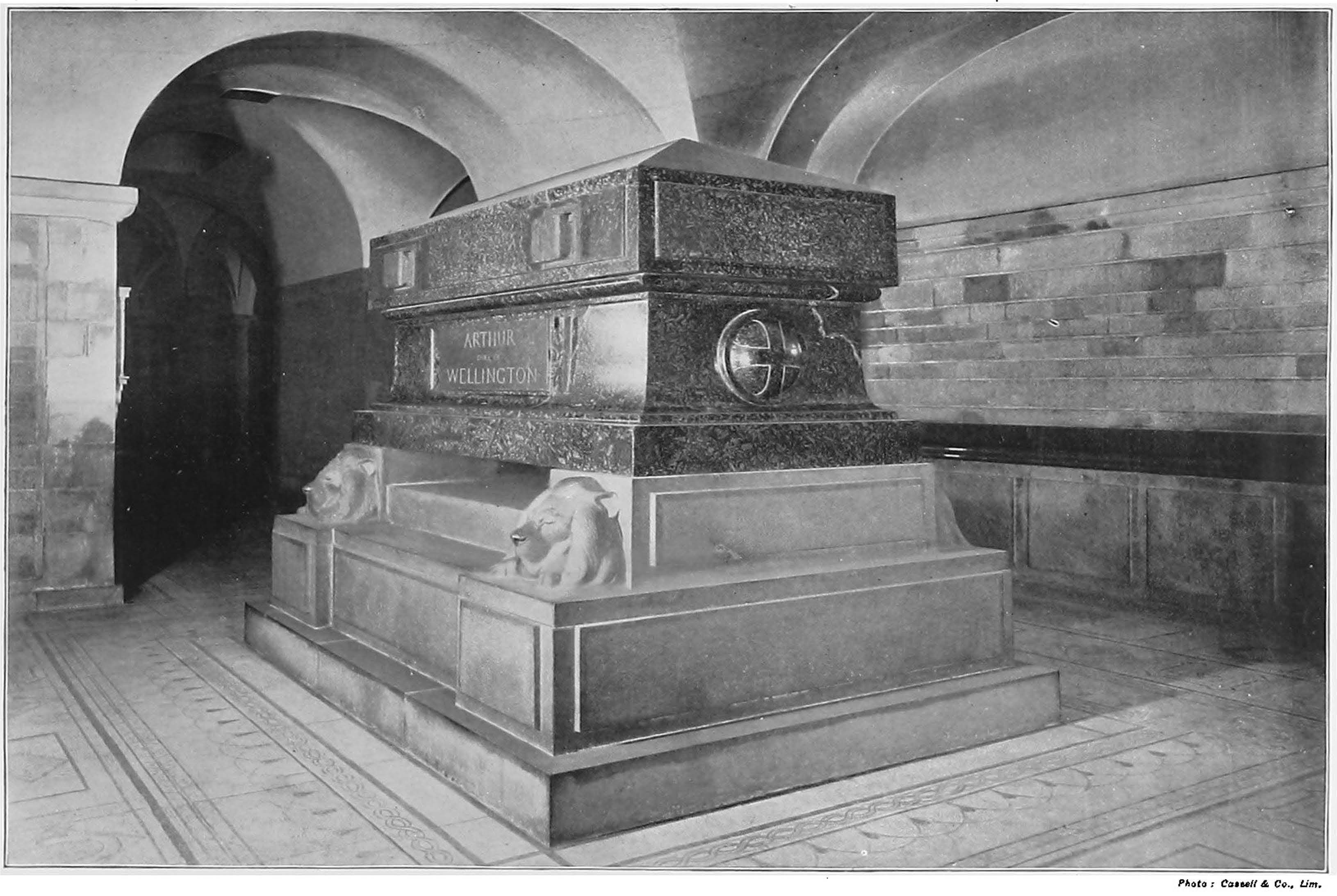
Wellington's tomb, in St Paul's Cathedral, London

Wellington died at Walmer Castle in Kent, his residence as Lord Warden of the Cinque Ports and reputedly his favourite home, on 14 September 1852. He was found to be unwell on that morning and was helped from his campaign bed, which he had used throughout his military career, and seated in his chair, in which he died. His death was recorded as being due to the after-effects of a stroke culminating in a series of seizures. He was aged 83.

Although in life he hated travelling by rail, having witnessed the death of William Huskisson, one of the first railway accident casualties, his body was taken by train to London, where he was given a state funeral – one of a small number of British subjects to be so honoured (other examples include Lord Nelson and Sir Winston Churchill). The funeral took place on 18 November 1852. Before the funeral, the Duke's body lay in state at the Royal Hospital Chelsea. Members of the royal family, including Queen Victoria, Prince Albert, the Prince of Wales, and the Princess Royal, visited to pay their respects. When viewing opened to the public, crowds thronged to visit and several people were killed in the crush. Queen Victoria wrote: "He was the pride and the bon génie, as it were, of this country! He was the GREATEST man this country ever produced, and the most devoted and loyal subject, and the staunchest supporter the Crown ever had."

He was buried in St Paul's Cathedral, and during his funeral, there was little space to stand due to the number of attendees. A bronze memorial was sculpted by Alfred Stevens, and features two intricate supports: "Truth tearing the tongue out of the mouth of False-hood", and "Valour trampling Cowardice underfoot". Stevens did not live to see it placed in its home under one of the arches of the cathedral.

Wellington's casket was decorated with banners which were made for his funeral procession. Originally, there was one from Prussia, which was removed during the First World War and never reinstated. In the procession, the "Great Banner" was carried by General Sir James Charles Chatterton of the 4th Dragoon Guards on the orders of Victoria.

Most of the book A Biographical Sketch of the Military and Political Career of the Late Duke of Wellington by the Weymouth newspaper proprietor Joseph Drew is a detailed contemporary account of his death, lying in state and funeral.

After his death, Irish and English newspapers disputed whether Wellington had been born an Irishman or an Englishman. In 2002 he was number 15 in the BBC's poll of the 100 Greatest Britons.

Owing to its links with Wellington, as the former commanding officer and colonel of the regiment, the title "33rd (The Duke of Wellington's) Regiment" was granted to the 33rd Regiment of Foot, on 18 June 1853 (the 38th anniversary of the Battle of Waterloo) by Queen Victoria. Wellington's battle record is exemplary; he participated in some 60 battles during the course of his military career.

== Personality ==
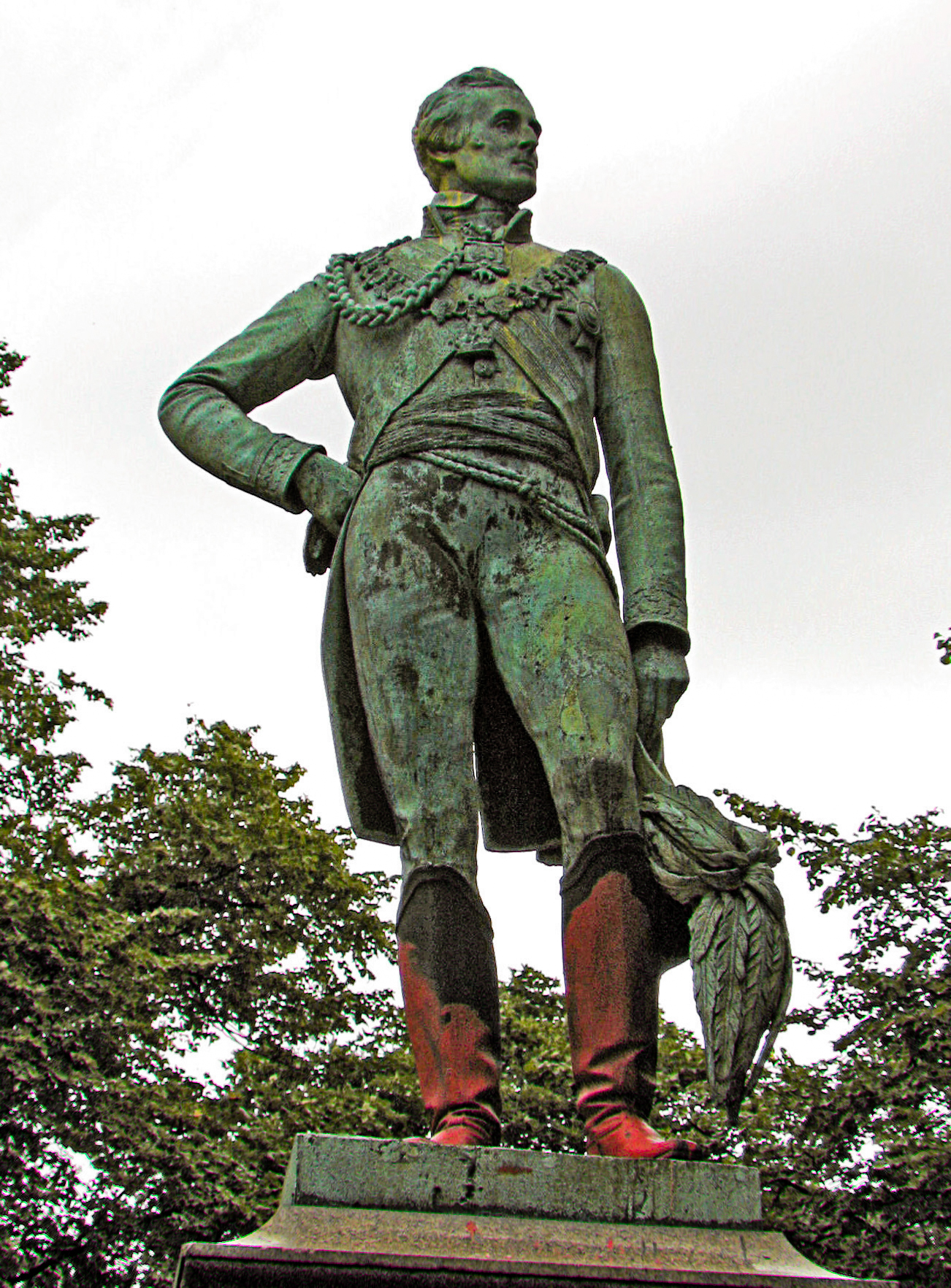
A bronze statue of Wellington by Carlo Marochetti in Woodhouse Moor, Leeds.

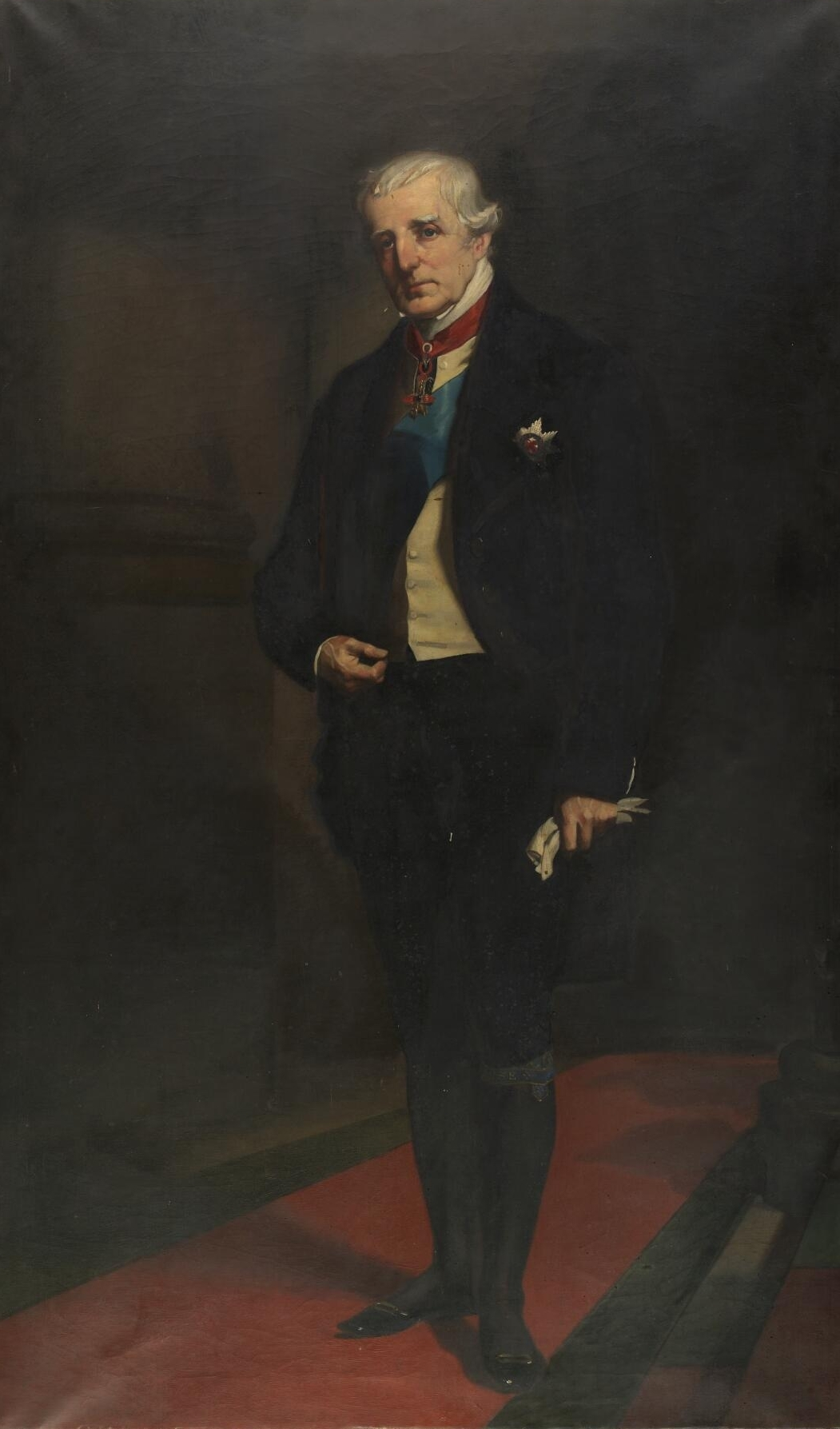
The Duke of Wellington, c. 1850

Wellington always rose early; he "couldn't bear to lie awake in bed", even if the army was not on the march. Even when he returned to civilian life after 1815, he slept in a camp bed, reflecting his lack of regard for creature comforts. General Miguel Ricardo de Álava complained that Wellington said so often that the army would march "at daybreak" and dine on "cold meat" that he began to dread those two phrases. While on campaign, he seldom ate anything between breakfast and dinner. During the retreat to Portugal in 1811, he subsisted on "cold meat and bread", to the despair of his staff who dined with him. He was, however, renowned for the quality of the wine that he drank and served, often drinking a bottle with his dinner (not a great quantity by the standards of his day).

Álava was a witness to an incident just before the Battle of Salamanca. Wellington was eating a chicken leg while observing the manoeuvres of the French army through a spyglass. He spotted an overextension in the French left flank, and realised that he could launch a successful attack there. He exclaimed "By God, that will do!" and threw the drumstick in the air. After the Battle of Toulouse, Colonel Frederick Ponsonby brought him the news of Napoleon's abdication, and Wellington broke into an impromptu flamenco dance, spinning around on his heels and clicking his fingers.

The military historian Charles Dalton recorded that, after a hard-fought battle in Spain, a young officer made the comment, "I am going to dine with Wellington tonight", which was overheard by the Duke as he rode by. "Give me at least the prefix of Mr. before my name," Wellington said. "My Lord," replied the officer, "we do not speak of Mr. Caesar or Mr. Alexander, so why should I speak of Mr. Wellington?"

While known for his stern countenance and iron-handed discipline, Wellington was by no means unfeeling. While he is said to have disapproved of soldiers cheering as "too nearly an expression of opinion", Wellington nevertheless cared for his men: he refused to pursue the French after the battles of Porto and Salamanca, foreseeing an inevitable cost to his army in chasing a diminished enemy through rough terrain. The only time that he ever showed grief in public was after the storming of Badajoz: he wept at the sight of the British dead in the breaches. In this context, his famous despatch after the Battle of Vitoria, calling them the "scum of the earth", can be seen to be fuelled as much by disappointment at their breaking ranks as by anger. He shed tears after Waterloo on the presentation of the list of British fallen by John Hume. Later with his family, unwilling to be congratulated for his victory, he broke down in tears, his fighting spirit diminished by the high cost of the battle and great personal loss.

Wellington's soldier servant, a gruff German called Beckerman, and his long-serving valet, James Kendall, who served him for 25 years and was with him when he died, were both devoted to him. (A story that he never spoke to his servants and preferred instead to write his orders on a notepad on his dressing table in fact probably refers to his son, the 2nd Duke. It was recorded by the 3rd Duke's niece, Viva Seton Montgomerie (1879–1959), as being an anecdote she heard from an old retainer, Charles Holman, who was said greatly to resemble Napoleon.)

Following an incident when, as Master-General of the Ordnance, he had been close to a large explosion, Wellington began to experience deafness and other ear-related problems. In 1822, a botched operation on his left ear led to permanent deafness on that side and some contemporaries suggested that he never fully recovered his health.

Wellington came to enjoy the company of a variety of intellectual and attractive women and had many amorous liaisons, particularly after the Battle of Waterloo and his subsequent ambassadorial position in Paris. In the days following Waterloo he had an affair with the notorious Lady Caroline Lamb, sister of one of his severely wounded officers and favourites, Col Frederick Ponsonby. He corresponded for many years with Lady Georgiana Lennox, later Lady de Ros, 26 years his junior and daughter of the Duchess of Richmond (who held the famous ball on the eve of Waterloo) and, though there are hints, it has not been clearly determined if the relationship was ever sexual. The British press lampooned the amorous side of the national hero. In 1824, one liaison came back to haunt him, when Wellington received a letter from a publisher, John Joseph Stockdale, offering to refrain from issuing an edition of the rather racy memoirs of one of his mistresses, Harriette Wilson, in exchange for money. It is said that the Duke promptly returned the letter, after scrawling across it, "Publish and be damned". However, Hibbert notes in his biography that the letter can be found among the Duke's papers, with nothing written on it. It is certain that Wellington did reply, and the tone of a further letter from the publisher, quoted by Longford, suggests that he had refused in the strongest language to submit to blackmail.

He was also a remarkably practical man who spoke concisely. In 1851, it was discovered that there were a great many sparrows flying about in the Crystal Palace just before the Great Exhibition was to open. His advice to Queen Victoria was "Sparrowhawks, ma'am".

Wellington has often been portrayed as a defensive general, even though many, perhaps most, of his battles were offensive (Argaum, Assaye, Oporto, Salamanca, Vitoria, Toulouse). However, for most of the Peninsular War, where he earned his fame, his army lacked the numbers for a strategically offensive posture.

== Titles and tributes ==
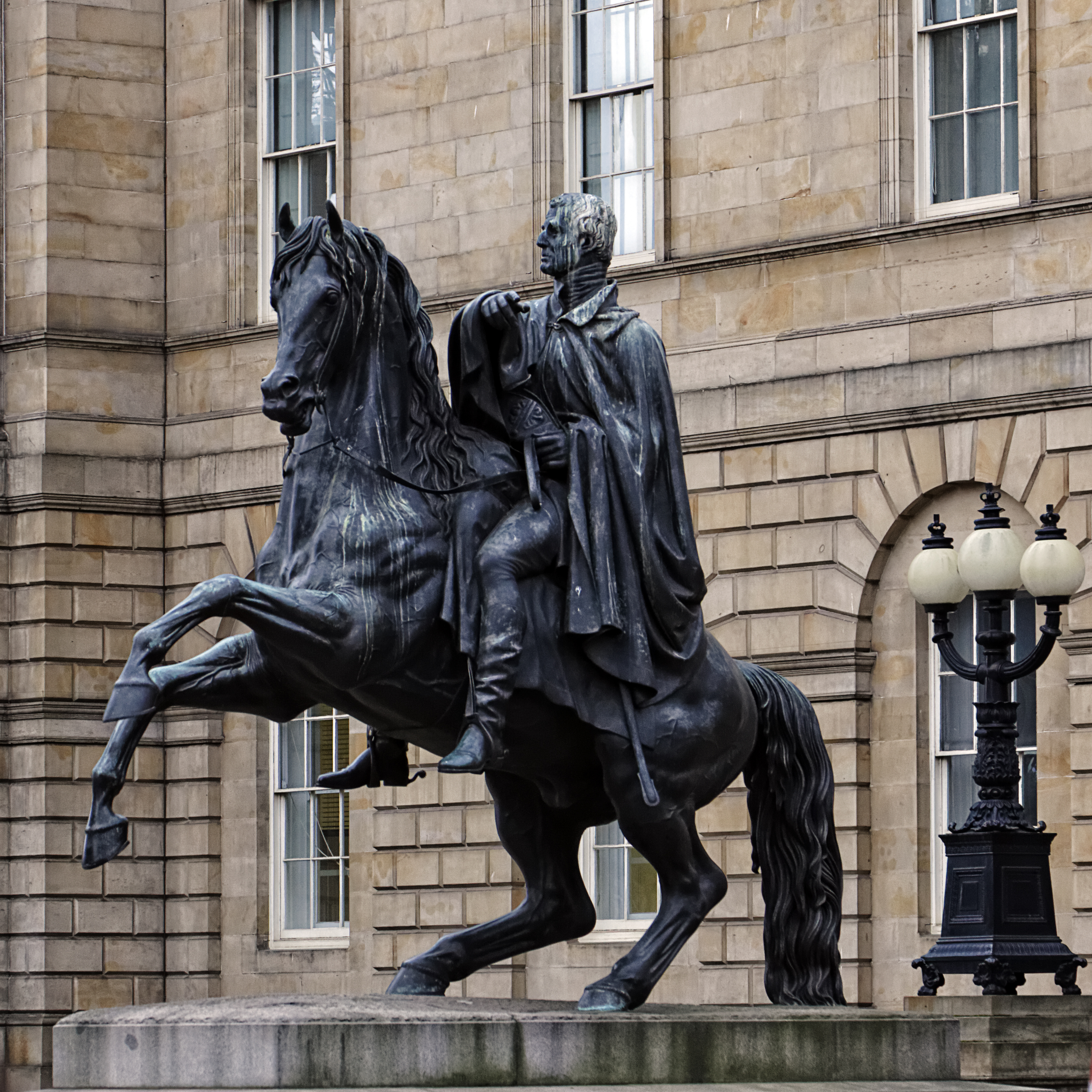
The Iron Duke in bronze – Sir John Steell's equestrian statue of the Duke of Wellington

=== Nicknames ===
The nickname "Iron Duke" relates to Wellington's political, rather than to his military, career. Its use is often disparaging. It is possible the term became more commonly used after 1832 when Wellington had metal shutters installed at Apsley House to prevent rioters breaking the windows. The term may have been made increasingly popular by Punch cartoons published in 1844–45.

In popular ballads of the day Wellington was called "Nosey" or "Old Nosey". More complimentary sobriquets, including "The Beau" and "Beau Douro", referenced his noted dress sense. Spanish troops called him "The Eagle", while Portuguese troops called him "Douro Douro" after his river crossing at Oporto in 1809.

Napoleon dismissed his opponent as a "Sepoy General", a reference to Wellington's service in India. The name was used in the French newspaper Le Moniteur Universel as a means of propaganda. His allies were more enthusiastic; Tsar Alexander I of Russia calling him "Le vainqueur du vainqueur du monde", the conqueror of the world's conqueror, the phrase "the world's conqueror" referring to Napoleon. Lord Tennyson uses a similar reference in his "Ode on the Death of the Duke of Wellington", referring to him as "the great World-victor's victor". Similar tags included "Europe's Liberator" and "Saviour of the Nations".

== See also ==
- Military career of Arthur Wellesley, 1st Duke of Wellington
- Army Gold Medal
- Cultural depictions of Arthur Wellesley, 1st Duke of Wellington
- Military General Service Medal
- Seringapatam Medal
- Cotiote War

Parliament of Ireland
Preceded by Hon. William Wellesley-Pole; John Pomeroy	Member of Parliament for Trim; 1790–1797; With: John Pomeroy 1790–1791; Hon. Clotworthy Taylor 1791–1795; Hon. Henry Wellesley 1795; William Arthur Crosbie 1795–1797	Succeeded by Sir Chichester Fortescue; William Arthur Crosbie
Parliament of the United Kingdom
Preceded by Thomas Davis Lamb; Sir Charles Talbot	Member of Parliament for Rye; 1806; Served alongside: Sir Charles Talbot	Succeeded by Patrick Crauford Bruce; Michael Angelo Taylor
Preceded by Samuel Boddington	Member of Parliament for Tralee; May–July 1807	Succeeded by Evan Foulkes
Preceded by Sir Christopher Hawkins; Frederick Trench	Member of Parliament for Mitchell; 1807; Served alongside: Henry Conyngham Montgomery	Succeeded by Edward Leveson-Gower; George Galway Mills
Preceded by Isaac Corry; Sir John Doyle	Member of Parliament for Newport (Isle of Wight); 1807–1809; Served alongside: The Viscount Palmerston	Succeeded by The Viscount Palmerston; Sir Leonard Worsley-Holmes
Political offices
Preceded by William Elliot	Chief Secretary for Ireland; 1807–1809	Succeeded by Robert Dundas
Preceded by The Earl of Mulgrave	Master-General of the Ordnance; 1819–1827	Succeeded by The Marquess of Anglesey
Preceded by The Viscount Goderich	Prime Minister of the United Kingdom; 22 January 1828 – 16 November 1830	Succeeded by The Earl Grey
Preceded by The Viscount Goderich	Leader of the House of Lords; 1828–1830	Succeeded by The Earl Grey
Preceded by Viscount Duncannon	Home Secretary (Caretaker); 1834	Succeeded by Henry Goulburn
Preceded by Thomas Spring Rice	Secretary of State for War and the Colonies (Caretaker); 1834	Succeeded by The Earl of Aberdeen
Preceded by The Viscount Palmerston	Foreign Secretary; 1834–1835	Succeeded by The Viscount Palmerston
Preceded by The Viscount Melbourne	Prime Minister of the United Kingdom (Caretaker); 17 November 1834 – 9 December 1834	Succeeded by Sir Robert Peel
Preceded by The Viscount Melbourne	Leader of the House of Lords; 1834–1835	Succeeded by The Viscount Melbourne
Preceded by The Viscount Melbourne	Leader of the House of Lords; 1841–1846	Succeeded by The Marquess of Lansdowne
Party political offices
First None recognised before	Leader of the Conservative Party; 1828–1834	Succeeded by Sir Robert Peel, Bt
First None recognised before	Leader of the Conservative Party in the House of Lords; 1828–1846	Succeeded by The Lord Stanley
Diplomatic posts
Vacant Napoleonic Wars Title last held by The Lord Whitworth of Newport Pratt	British Ambassador to France; 1814–1815	Succeeded by Sir Charles Stuart
Academic offices
Preceded by Baron Grenville	Chancellor of the University of Oxford; 1834–1852	Succeeded by Earl of Derby
Military offices
Preceded by The Marquess Cornwallis	Colonel of the 33rd (the 1st Yorkshire West Riding) Regiment of Foot; 1806–1813	Succeeded by Sir John Sherbrooke
Preceded by The Duke of Northumberland	Colonel of the Royal Regiment of Horse Guards (The Blues); 1813–1827	Succeeded by The Duke of Cumberland
Preceded by The Duke of Richmond	Governor of Plymouth; 1819–1827	Succeeded by The Earl Harcourt
Preceded by Sir David Dundas	Colonel-in-Chief of the Rifle Brigade; 1820–1852	Succeeded by Prince Albert
Preceded by The Duke of York	Colonel of the Grenadier Guards; 1827–1852	Succeeded by Prince Albert
Preceded by The Duke of York	Commander-in-Chief of the Forces; 1827–1828	Succeeded by The Lord Hill
Preceded by The Viscount Hill	Commander-in-Chief of the Forces; 1842–1852	Succeeded by The Viscount Hardinge
Honorary titles
Preceded by The Earl of Malmesbury	Lord Lieutenant of Hampshire; 1820–1852	Succeeded by The Marquess of Winchester
Preceded by The Marquess of Hastings	Constable of the Tower; Lord Lieutenant of the Tower Hamlets; 1827–1852	Succeeded by The Viscount Combermere
Preceded by The Earl of Liverpool	Lord Warden of the Cinque Ports; 1829–1852	Succeeded by The Marquess of Dalhousie
Peerage of the United Kingdom
New creation	Duke of Wellington; 1814–1852	Succeeded by Arthur Wellesley
New creation	Marquess of Wellington; 1812–1852	Succeeded by Arthur Wellesley
New creation	Earl of Wellington; 1812–1852	Succeeded by Arthur Wellesley
New creation	Viscount Wellington; 1809–1852	Succeeded by Arthur Wellesley
Portuguese nobility
New creation	Duke of Vitória; 1812–1852	Succeeded by Arthur Wellesley
New creation	Count of Vimeiro; 1811–1852	Succeeded by Arthur Wellesley
Spanish nobility		Succeeded by Arthur Wellesley
New creation	Duke of Ciudad Rodrigo; 1812–1852	Succeeded by Arthur Wellesley
Dutch nobility
New creation	Prince of Waterloo; 1815–1852	Succeeded by Arthur Wellesley
