= 2002 in Ireland =

- Centuries: 19th; 20th; 21st
- Decades: 1980s; 1990s; 2000s; 2010s; 2020s
- See also: 2002 in Northern Ireland; Other events of 2002; List of years in Ireland

Events from the year 2002 in Ireland.

== Incumbents ==
- President: Mary McAleese
- Taoiseach: Bertie Ahern (FF)
- Tánaiste: Mary Harney (PD)
- Minister for Finance: Charlie McCreevy (FF)
- Chief Justice: Ronan Keane
- Dáil:
  - 28th (until 25 April 2002)
  - 29th (from 6 June 2002)
- Seanad:
  - 21st (until 26 June 2002)
  - 22nd (from 12 September 2002)

== Events ==
- 1 January – The Euro Currency officially became the legal tender for the Republic of Ireland, along with the other European Union (EU) Eurozone member area countries, replacing the Irish pound by being introduced physically with the official launch of the currency coins and banknotes.
- 9 January – Former Soviet leader Mikhail Gorbachev received the Freedom of the City of Dublin.
- 7 March – A referendum on a proposal to amend the Constitution to remove the threat of suicide as a ground for legal abortion was narrowly defeated.
- 13 March – The MS Stena Europe ferry was introduced on the Fishguard–Rosslare route.
- 21 March – The third Coimisiún na Gaeltachta published its report on strengthening the role of the Irish language in the Gaeltacht.
- 2 April – Brendan Comiskey, the Roman Catholic Bishop of Ferns, resigned after criticism of his handling of abuse cases in the diocese.
- 5 April – The first recruits of the new Police Service of Northern Ireland graduated.
- 17 May – The Fianna Fáil-Progressive Democrats coalition was re-elected in the general election. It was the first government to be re-elected since 1969. Fianna Fáil achieved 80 seats, just four short of an overall majority. Fine Gael lost 23 seats, and the Labour Party remained static. Increased support for Sinn Féin resulted in four extra TDs. Michael Noonan resigned as leader of Fine Gael and Ruairi Quinn resigned as leader of the Labour Party.
- 1 June – The national football team began its 2002 FIFA World Cup campaign.
- 11 October – Geraldine Kennedy was appointed the first female editor of The Irish Times.
- 14 October – As of midnight the Northern Ireland Assembly and Executive were suspended by order of the British Secretary of State for Northern Ireland.
- 19 October – Irish voters accepted the Treaty of Nice in the second referendum held on the issue.
- The Garda College Museum and Visitor Centre is opened at the Garda Síochána College, Templemore, County Tipperary.
- The Anna Livia monument on O'Connell Street, Dublin is removed to make way for The Spire.

== Arts and literature ==
- February – Sebastian Barry's satire Hinterland, based on the life of Charles Haughey, premièred at the Abbey Theatre, Dublin, causing controversy.
- 10 August – Niall Bruton's sculpture "Waiting on Shore" was unveiled at Rosses Point.
- 26 September – Five Old Master paintings from the Alfred Beit collection were stolen from Russborough House, the fourth major art theft from this location.
- 25 October – Peter Mullan's film The Magdalene Sisters was released in Ireland.
- The Chester Beatty Library in Dublin won the European Museum of the Year Award.
- John Banville's novel Shroud was published.
- Joseph O'Connor's historical novel Star of the Sea was published.
- Louis le Brocquy's 1951 painting A Family was presented to the National Gallery of Ireland (Dublin) as a gift of Lochlann and Brenda Quinn, the first painting by a living artist to enter the gallery's permanent collection.

== Sport ==
=== Association football ===
- Shelbourne won the League of Ireland for the tenth time.

2002 FIFA World Cup

Group stage

- Ireland 1–1 Cameroon
- Ireland 1–1 Germany
- Ireland 3–0 Saudi Arabia

Knockout stage

- Ireland 1-1 Spain (Spain won 3–2 on penalties)

=== Show jumping ===
- Dermott Lennon won the individual Show Jumping World Championship on Liscalgot.

=== Gaelic games ===
All-Ireland Senior Hurling Championship Final

- Kilkenny 2–20 – 0–19 Clare.

All-Ireland Senior Football Championship Final

- Armagh 1–12 – 0–14 Kerry.

=== Golf ===
- Murphy's Irish Open was won by Søren Hansen (Denmark).

=== Rugby union ===
2002 Six Nations Championship

- Ireland lost to England and France.

2001–02 Heineken Cup

- Munster and Leinster advanced from the pool stage. Leinster were defeated in the quarter-finals while Munster were defeated by Leicester in the final.

== Births ==
- 2 March – Armstrong Okoflex, footballer
- 4 March – Troy Parrott, footballer
- 29 August – Rhasidat Adeleke, sprinter
- 12 November– Hazel Doupe, actress

== Deaths ==
=== January to June ===
- 14 January – Colm Hilliard, Fianna Fáil TD (born 1936).
- 16 January – Jim Tunney, former Fianna Fáil TD, Minister of State and Lord Mayor of Dublin (born 1923).
- 22 February –
  - Paddy Ambrose, soccer player and coach (born 1930).
  - Brendan O'Dowda, tenor singer (born 1925).
- 27 February – Spike Milligan, comedian, poet and writer (born 1918 in the British Raj).
- 14 March – Kevin Danaher, folklorist and writer (born 1913).
- 19 March – David Beers Quinn, historian (born 1909).
- 8 May – Sylvester Barrett, former Fianna Fáil TD, Cabinet Minister and MEP (born 1926).
- 30 May – John B. Keane, playwright, novelist and essayist (born 1928).

=== July to December ===
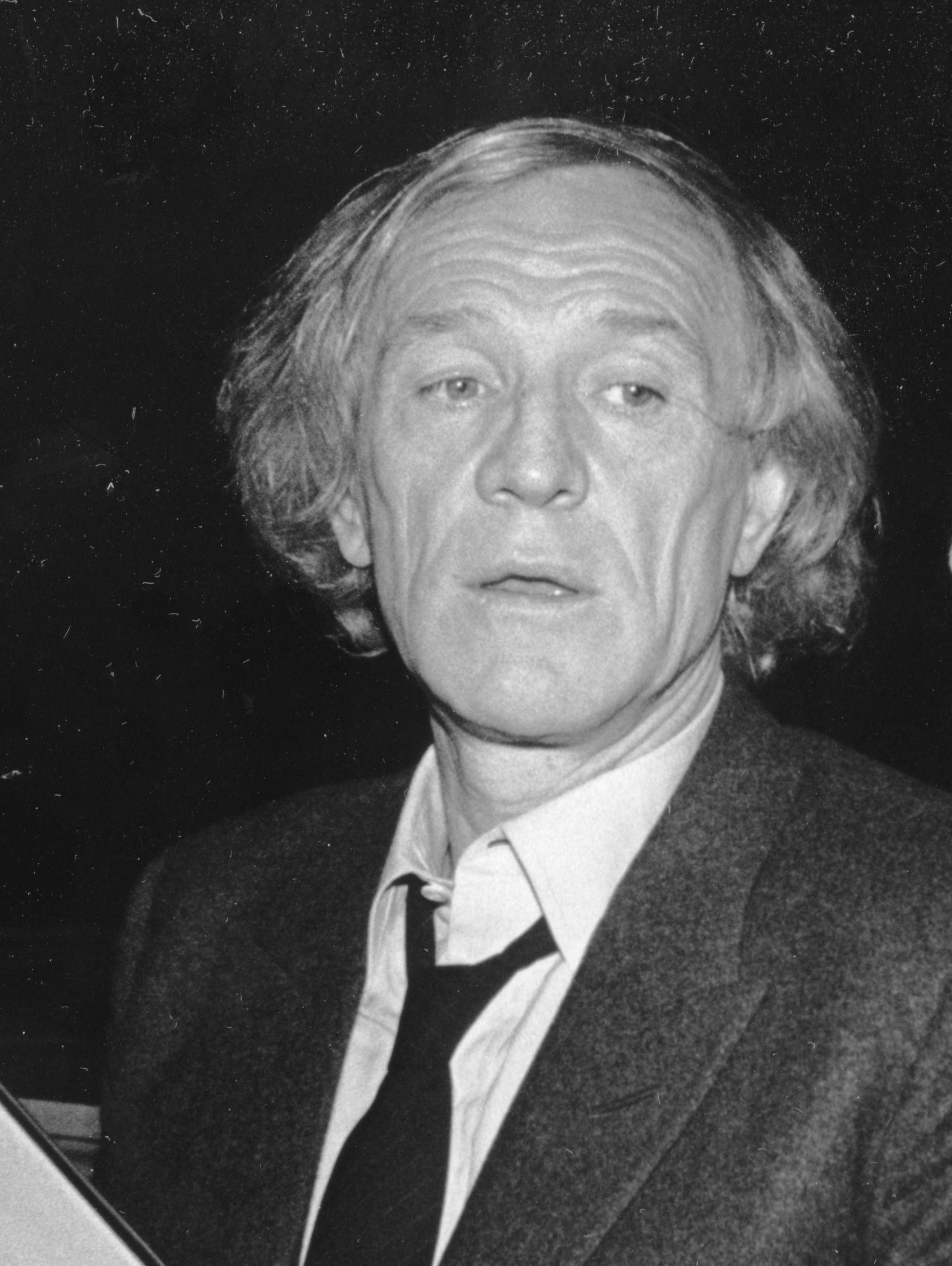
Richard Harris

- 1 August – Brendan Menton Snr, soccer administrator and president of the Football Association of Ireland (born 1912).
- 28 August – Jim McFadden, ice hockey player (born 1920).
- 4 September – David Molony, lawyer, former Fine Gael TD and Seanad member (born 1950).
- 16 September – David Grene, classical scholar (born 1913).
- 20 September – Pat Saward, soccer player (born 1928).
- 17 October – Derek Bell, harpist and composer (born 1935).
- 25 October – Richard Harris, actor (born 1930).
- 2 November – Brian Behan, writer and trade unionist (born 1926).
- 2 December – Jim Mitchell, former Fine Gael TD and Cabinet Minister (born 1946).
- 3 December – Glenn Quinn, actor (born 1970).
- 18 December – Lucy Grealy, poet and memoirist (born 1963).
- 24 December – Alan Clodd, book collector, dealer and publisher (born 1918).

=== Full date unknown ===
- Frances Kelly, painter (born 1908).
- Owen Walsh, artist (born 1933).

== See also ==
- 2002 in Irish television
