= Templemore (disambiguation) =

Templemore is a town in County Tipperary, Ireland.

Templemore may also refer to:

- Garda Síochána College in the town, the training college for the Irish police, sometimes referred to as "Templemore"
- Templemore railway station in the town
- Baron Templemore, County Donegal, a title in the peerage of the United Kingdom
- Templemore Cathedral, a destroyed medieval cathedral in Derry, Northern Ireland
- Templemore, a parish of County Londonderry, Northern Ireland
