= Templemore College =

Templemore College may refer to two institutions in Templemore, County Tipperary, Ireland:

- Templemore College of Further Education, with a variety of courses for the general public
- Garda Síochána College, the training college for the Irish police
