= Garda College Museum and Visitor Centre =

- Mhúsaem an Coláiste Garda Síochána agus Ionad Cuartaíochta
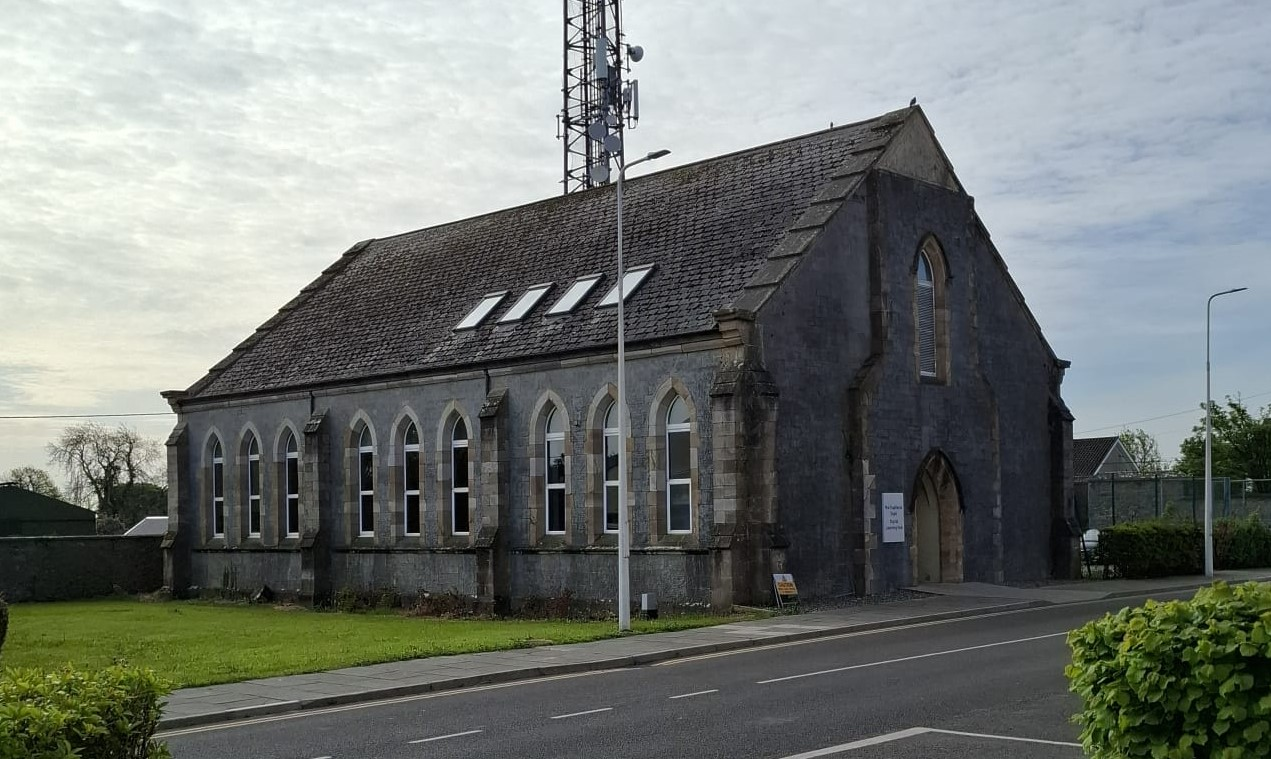
- The chapel (former museum building) in 2025

- Location within Ireland
- Established: 2002
- Dissolved: 2020
- Location: McCann Barracks, Templemore
- Coordinates: 52°47′25″N 7°50′25″W
- Type: Police museum
- Website: The Garda College Museum and Visitor Centre, Templemore

The Garda College Museum and Visitor Centre (Irish: Mhúsaem an Coláiste Garda Síochána agus Ionad Cuartaíochta) was a police museum located in the chapel of the Garda Síochána College at McCan Barracks, Templemore, County Tipperary, Ireland where members of the Garda Síochána (the Irish police service) are educated and trained.

The museum was popular with Transition Year school groups from the wider Munster area, as well as members of local Active Retirement Associations.

== Background and operation ==
On 20 January 1995, the Garda Síochána Historical Society was created based on a meeting held at the Garda Museum and Archives, with the aim of bringing the history and traditions of Irish policing into the public arena. A Garda at the college, Sergeant John Reynolds, established the museum in 2002 in order to "promote the history of the barracks and policing in Ireland". Reynolds has functioned as the curator of the collection since that date.

It served as the only Garda museum in the state until 2017 when the main Garda Museum opened at Dublin Castle. From that point on, until the Garda College Museum finally closed in 2020, the two museums worked together in a cooperative capacity.

== Scope of collection ==
The displays in the museum included historic police and military artefacts from Ireland and around the world. The collection also included items of memorabilia which had been donated by local people.

Other displays included counterfeit currency as well as ATM 'skimming' devices. A planned expansion to the museum in 2008 aimed to explore the military history of the Templemore complex from 1815 to 1921. It is unclear if this was ever achieved.

== Reformatting ==
In March 2020, as a response to the COVID-19 pandemic, the museum was temporarily closed to visitors (as was the college swimming pool which the public had been previously allowed to use). In May 2020, it was reported in the Tipperary Live newspaper that there were "fears for the future of the museum and the items of historical significance housed there", as it was reported that the museum space was being used for training. The Irish Examiner revealed that the reason for this had been "social distancing requirements caused by the coronavirus outbreak (putting) greater demands on, and use of, the space available at the training college for recruits". In May 2020, headed by Cathaoirleach Cllr Michael Smith, the council demanded a meeting be held with Garda officials recommending that lines of communication be reopened with Garda management. Plans for incorporating a museum into the newly renovated Templemore Town Hall had been mooted as early as November 2018.

On 25 May 2020, The Irish Examiner reported that almost 1,000 people had signed an online petition requesting the Minister for Justice to 'save the Irish Garda Museum' located at Templemore. The Garda Press Office noted that while artefacts in Templemore had been "the subject of changed (access) arrangements", this did not constitute a closure of the museum proper and that the public would be allowed to visit again once the restrictions imposed on visitors due to COVID-19 were lifted. In July 2020, it was noted by Tipp FM that the collection of historic artefacts would not be lost or put into storage, but would instead "form part of a new walking tour for people to visit" within the college itself.

== Relocation of items ==
At least some of the items from the collection were subsequently donated/loaned to the National Museum at Collins Barracks, Dublin by Sgt Reynolds following the Garda College Museum's closure in 2020. These included a tin water canteen engraved by a WWI German POW who had been interned at McCann Barracks in 1914/1915 (then known as Richmond Barracks).

Sgt Reynolds, who has a Doctorate in History from the University of Limerick, wrote "extensively about the 2,300 German POWs that were sent to Templemore" coming up to the centenary of the start of WWI in 2014, and in 2023 met with the grandson of the POW who had engraved the bottle.

== See also ==
- Kickham Barracks, Clonmel, an 18th-century barracks which has been proposed as a possible site for a military museum in County Tipperary
