= Clonmore =

Clonmore may refer to:

== Places ==
Northern Ireland

- Clonmore, County Armagh, a hamlet and townland
- Clonmore, County Tyrone, a townland

Republic of Ireland

- Clonmore, County Carlow, a village
- Clonmore, a former parish now part of Togher, County Louth
- Clonmore, County Tipperary, a village
- Clonmore, Kilcleagh, a townland in Kilcleagh civil parish, barony of Clonlonan, County Westmeath
- Clonmore, Mullingar, a townland in Mullingar civil parish, barony of Moyashel and Magheradernon, County Westmeath
- Clonmore, Street, a townland in Street civil parish, barony of Moygoish, County Westmeath
