= Templemore Town Hall =

Municipal building in Templemore, County Tipperary, Ireland

- Halla an Bhaile An Teampall Mór
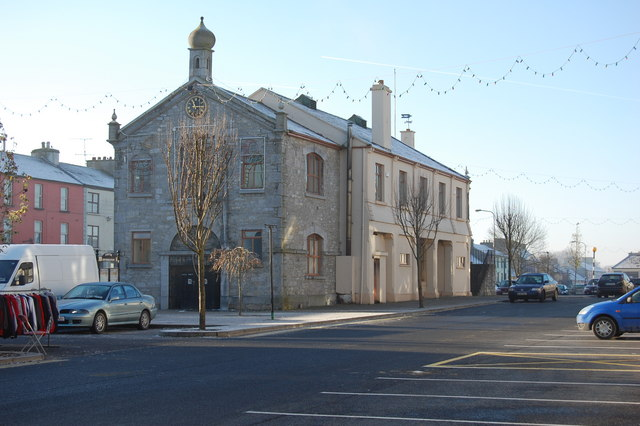
- Templemore Town Hall

- Location within Ireland

General information
- Architectural style: Neoclassical style
- Location: Main Street, Templemore, Ireland
- Coordinates: 52.7966°N 7.8341°W
- Completed: 1816

Templemore Town Hall (Irish: Halla an Bhaile An Teampall Mór), is a municipal building in Main Street, Templemore, County Tipperary, Ireland. As of May 2023, it was being converted into a library and enterprise and cultural centre.

== History ==
The building was financed using public subscription by the tenants of Sir John Craven Carden, 1st Baronet and commissioned as a market house in the early 19th century. The site selected was the traditional venue for holding markets in the middle of Main Street. It was designed in the neoclassical style, built in ashlar stone and was completed in 1816.

The design involved a rectangular building with two main frontages of seven bays each facing onto the northwest and southeast sides of Main Street. It featured segmental headed openings with architraves and keystones on the ground floor and segmental headed windows with voussoirs on the first floor. It was gabled at both ends with an external staircase at the southwest gable end. The northeast gable end contained a rounded headed opening with iron gates and voussoirs on the ground floor and a blind window with a window sill and voussoirs on the first floor. The outer bays of the northeast gable end were fenestrated by small windows on both floors. The corners of the building were decorated with quoins and, at roof level, with finials.

The building was altered to accommodate the offices of the newly-formed town commissioners in the mid-19th century, and it became the offices and meeting place of Templemore Urban District Council when it was formed in 1900. Following the killing of Police District Inspector William Haring Wilson by the Irish Republican Army on 16 August 1920, soldiers of the Northamptonshire Regiment set fire to the town hall in a reprisal attack. Lieutenant Colonel Sydney Herbert Beattie and Lance Corporal Herbert John Fuggle of the Northampton Regiment was killed in ensuing conflagration. The building was repaired and the central five bays widened, to a design by Thomas Francis McNamara, in 1927.

Following the closure of McCan Barracks in the early 1960s, two QF 4.5-inch howitzers were retained and subsequently moved outside the southwest end of the town hall. The building continued to be used as the offices of the urban district council until 2002, and then as the offices of the successor town council. The building ceased to be the local seat of government in 2014, when the council was dissolved and administration of the town was amalgamated with Tipperary County Council in accordance with the Local Government Reform Act 2014.

An extensive programme of works, involving the conversion of the building into a library and enterprise and cultural centre and the construction of a new civic plaza, started on site in May 2023. The work, which was financed by the Department of Rural and Community Development and Tipperary County Council, was being carried out by Leetherm Construction at a cost of €4 million to a design by EML Architects.
