= McCan Barracks =

- Dún Mhic Cana
- Templemore, County Tipperary
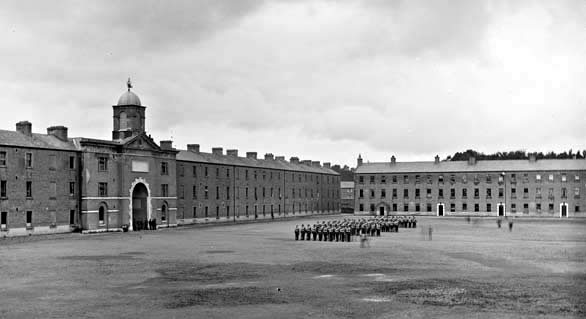
- McCan Barracks

Site information
- Type: Barracks
- Operator: (Republic of Ireland) Irish Army

Location
- Location within Ireland
- Coordinates: 52.79158°N 7.84226°W

Site history
- Built: 1815
- Built for: War Office
- In use: 1815-1964

McCan Barracks (Irish: Dún Mhic Cana) is a barracks, in Templemore, County Tipperary in Ireland, which is used by both the Garda Síochána College and the Defence Forces. Originally built in the 19th century and known as Richmond Barracks, it was renamed in honour of Pierce McCan in the early 20th century. It took on the role as the national centre for training the Garda Síochána – Ireland's police force – in 1964 when Garda Headquarters in the Phoenix Park ceased to perform that role. The barracks also houses a small detachment of the Irish Army and is home to a unit of the Irish Army Reserve.

== Early history ==
Prior to Irish independence, the installation was known as Richmond Barracks, after the area of the town in which it is located. The 17-acre site for the barracks was donated to the Crown by a local landlord, Sir John Craven Carden, 1st Baronet, in September 1808. It began development when the British administration decided that yet another barracks was required in County Tipperary. The first site selected was in Thurles beside the River Suir. However, as that site was adjacent to the convent of the Ursuline Nuns, the nuns successfully objected to a military barracks so near to their foundation. As a result, the War Office decided to build the installation in Templemore instead.

Its construction was started and completed in the first decade of 1800. Sir John Carden also gave a training and recreation ground of 40 acres adjoining. The barracks had two squares, surrounded by company lines, stores, married quarters, officers mess block, church, military prison and hospital. The site was surrounded by a high wall, with projecting fire positions at each corner. Its accommodation included: the commanding officer's house and garden, quarters for two field officers, 23 other officers, married quarters for 48 other ranks, and for 767 other unmarried personnel. It also had 36 hospital beds, 15 guard room cells, and stabling for 27 officers’ horses.

== Richmond Barracks ==
On its completion, the barracks was named Richmond Barracks. This name, and those given at the time to facilities in the close vicinity, recalled historic events of that era, such as Talavera Place, Vinerma Mall and Regent Bridge. The establishment of the barracks gave a boost to the economic and social life of Templemore, with business in the town developing around it. However, due to the demand for farm products in the barracks, there was for many years no market for these goods in the town itself.

In the Irish 1848 Rising, troops were assigned from here to round up and arrest suspects in the Ballingarry area.

== Location ==
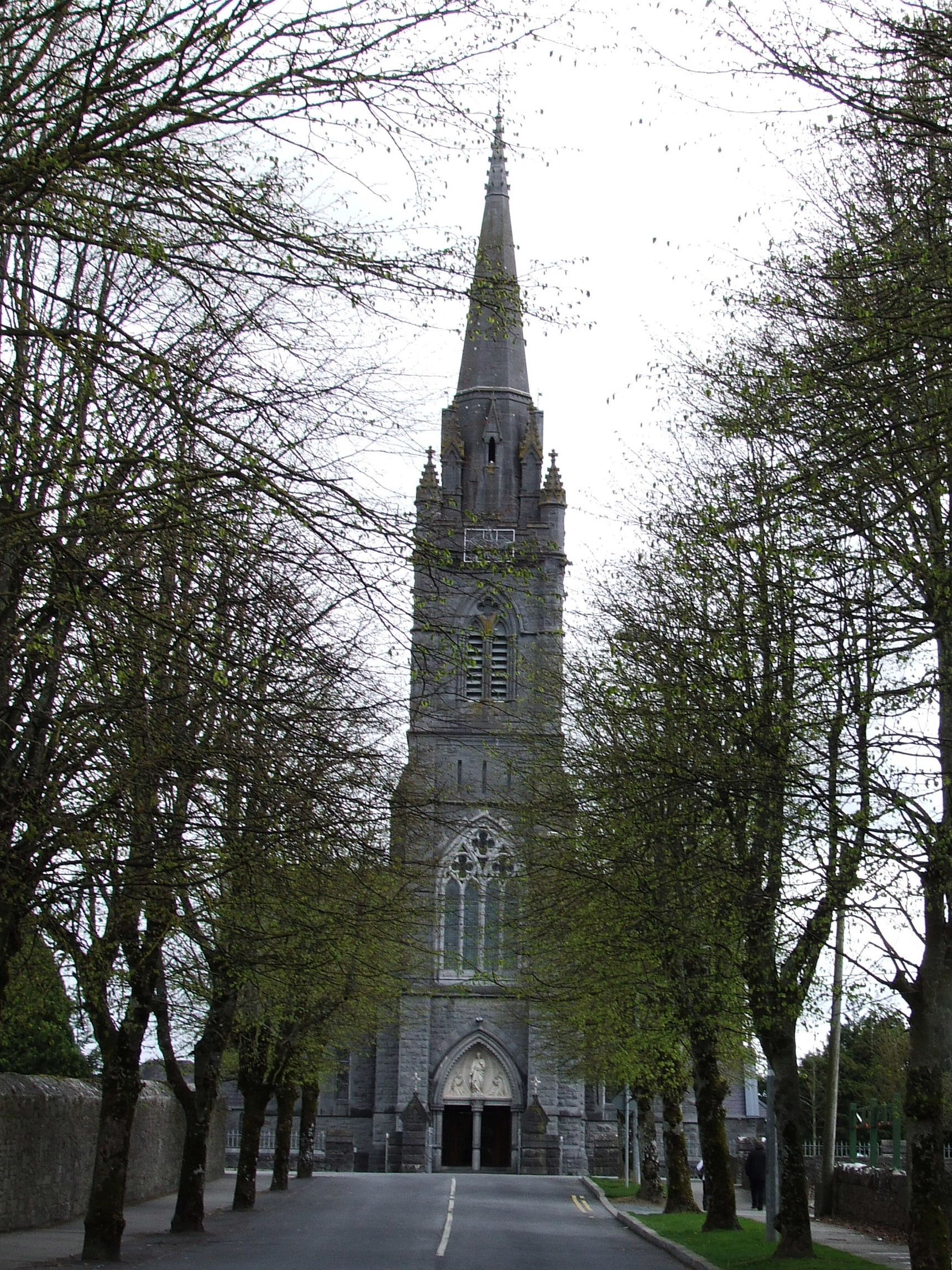
Church of the Sacred Heart, Church Avenue

The barracks was situated on the regular grid pattern for which the town of Templemore is noted and for which Sir John Craven Carden was also responsible. It occupies the most elevated ground in the town and is less than 50 meters from the main gate lodge of the Priory - the main residence of the baronet. A broad boulevard (Church Avenue) extends from the entrance gates over the River Mall at "Small Bridge" to the crossroads at Bank Street (called Military Street pre-independence). From the crossroads, the left hand road proceeds directly to the Town Hall while straight ahead, the avenue leads to the Church of the Sacred Heart (Roman Catholic). The right-hand road terminates at Templemore railway station which opened on 3 July 1848. Proximity to the station greatly facilitated the rapid movement of crown forces throughout the province of Munster.

== Templemore races 1856 ==
Relations between the military and the local townspeople in Templemore were not always the best. There is at least one occasion known when there was a serious fracas between both parties. That was on race day held in Templemore in April 1856, on occasion which saw an attendance of approximately 1,300 men from the barracks. Towards the end of the day, a number of soldiers began to fight with civilians. As the number of combatants grew, the soldiers began to gather in groups, then taking off their belts they attacked the crowd indiscriminately. The Tipperary men, armed with sticks, fought back. Eventually, both groups were separated by a squad of armed soldiers with bayonets fixed and aided by police. The troops were lined up ready to march back to the barracks when a civilian approached an officer to lodge a complaint. The soldiers broke ranks to attack him, and the free-for-all fight broke out again. A number of the soldiers reportedly taunted the locals, shouting "we have beaten Tipperary". Following this, the local people turned on the military with such ferocity that they were forced to retreat. That night in the Templemore barracks, the casualty list showed 3 men near to death, another close to losing an eye and an officer with a broken arm.

== Fenians ==
During the late 1850s and 1860s, when the Fenian Brotherhood was being organised, a large number of Irishmen who were soldiers in the British Army in Ireland, were 'sworn in' as members of the Fenian movement. This also occurred at Templemore. As a result of this, in December 1885, the 11th Depot Battalion which had been stationed here for a long time, was broken up and transferred to Newry and Enniskillen. It was then replaced by the 59th Regiment from Glasgow. The reason was published at the time in The Nenagh Guardian which reported:

The reason assigned for the transfer of the 11th Depot Battalion from Templemore is that it was strongly suspected that those troops were tainted with Fenianism. Templemore is the Headquarters of a Depot Battn. And the majority of those soldiers are recruits drafted from several parts of Ireland, but Tipperary-men predominate. Several of these soldiers were constantly entering public houses and associating with persons whose feeling of loyalty was not strong. The officers knew this, and the Commanding Officer – Colonel W. Irwin – spoke to the men on the subject, but his words had no effect. Those troops are now being replaced by an English Battalion. The people of the town very much regret the change. In addition it may be mentioned that the 11th Battn hunted its own pack of hounds, and when leaving, the officers offered for sale by private treaty "30 dogs, 27 horses, and a large amount of leather equipment for same".

Reputedly, even when transferred to Enniskillen, the troops retained their "taint of Fenianism", because again in the Nenagh Guardian it is stated:

"Two private soldiers lately removed from Templemore to Enniskillen on account of a report that some of their Battn were tampering with Fenianism, were arrested in Enniskillen for singing Fenian songs. They were placed in the cells pending orders from Dublin. When arrested one of the soldiers remarked that the whole company to which he belonged might as well be arrested as him."

At a local Petty Sessions Court in Templemore, on 15 May 1865, an old woman was sentenced to one month imprisonment for stealing a key from the door of one Capt. Thomas Borrow of the 11th Battalion. This Capt Borrow was the father of the novelist George Borrow who accompanied his father when his battalion moved to Templemore. Borrow mentions the town in some of his books, describing his wandering on horseback around the locality and up to the "Devil's Bit" mountain.

== World War I ==
The period of the First World War (1914–1918) was a time of great activity for the then Richmond Barracks. At the outbreak of the war, the British Government used the barracks as a prisoner of war camp in which during the first years of the war several hundred German prisoners were interned. The prisoners included a large number of Prussian Guards. To contain them, the two barracks squares were divided into four typical concentration camp compounds surrounded by heavy barbed wire entanglements, each with a high sentry observation tower with a machine gun and search lights. By the end of 1914, the camp contained over 2,000 German and Austrian prisoners.

The prisoners were about equally divided between the Catholic and Protestant faiths and each Sunday they marched down to their respective churches. One of each faith died while there and were buried in the local cemetery. Their remains were subsequently removed and reinterred in the German National Cemetery in Glencree. Early in 1916, the German prisoners were transferred to England. It was rumoured that the South Tipperary Volunteers were planning the release of the prisoners.

After the barracks was vacated, it then became a training centre for the Royal Munster Fusiliers. Thousands were trained here for the Western Front and the battlefields of Passchendaele and the Somme. During training, the recruits would sometimes have to march about 90 km from Templemore to practise on the firing ranges in Kilworth. While in the camp, the troops learned about digging full-sized trenches complete with redoubts. The remains of these trenches were restored into the local golf links when the Garda Síochána College arrived in 1964. During their stay in Templemore, the chaplain to the Munster Fusiliers was a local man Father Francis Gleeson.

== Easter Rising ==
During the Easter Rising, the barracks was occupied by the 10th Battalion of the Northamptonshire Regiment under the command of Major Phibbs. At the end of World War I, the regiment still occupied the barracks. On two occasions during the War of Independence, the regiment carried out reprisals in the town – one for the shooting of a district inspector who was shot in Patrick Street after which they completely burned the Town Hall and on the second occasion wrecking most of the houses in the town to avenge an ambush in the area. During those years, the troops were used against the Irish Republican Army in County Tipperary, together with the Black and Tans and the Auxiliaries (stationed in Sir John Cardon's residence, later burned down in the civil war). The war ended with the truce of July 1921. The barracks was then handed over to the Irish Republican Army on 13 February 1922. The handing over was made at a ceremony in the barracks, with Major Phibbs, O/C of the 10th Battn. Northamptonshire Regiment, signing for the British Forces and Comdt. Sean Scott, O/C 2nd Battn. 2nd Mid-Tipperary Brigade IRA signing for the Republican side.

== McCan Barracks ==
The 2nd Mid-Tipperary Brigade now took over under the command of Brigadier James Leahy together and his Adjutant Michael Hynes. The name of the post was changed to McCan Barracks. This was to commemorate the first Sinn Féin MP for Mid-Tipperary, Pierce McCan, who had died while detained in Gloucester Prison in 1919.

Following the signing of the Anglo-Irish Treaty of December 1921 and the establishment of the Irish Provisional Government the troops in the barracks decided to support the anti-treaty side in the Irish Civil War and put the barracks in a state of defence. Troops of the National Army soon occupied the town, and were prepared to attack the barracks. Through the intervention of Dr. John Harty, then Archbishop of Cashel and Emly, hostilities were called off and the troops in possession were allowed to evacuate. After the legal establishment of the Defence Forces in October 1924 the Irish Army remained in possession until 1929.

When World War II commenced in 1939, the barracks was again occupied, this time by the 10th Southern Battalion of the Irish Army, where a very large garrison was stationed until The Emergency ended, when the barracks was again vacated. During the 1950s a number of very successful FCA camps were held here. When the FCAs were integrated into the regular army, the McCan barracks became the headquarters of the 3rd, F.A Regt., and of the 9th Field Battery of that Regt., which it still is.

== Garda College ==
The site took on the new role of the Garda (Ireland's National Police) training centre in February 1964 when the Garda Headquarters in the Phoenix Park ceased to perform that role. The barracks was taken over by the Minister for Justice and completely redesigned and reconstructed, adding many facilities to it. It operated as a training centre until it closed in 1987 and modernized to the most up to date standards in Europe. It reopened as the Garda College in 1989 and now operates as a police training facility and third level institution.

== See also ==
- List of Irish military installations
