= Killea =

Killea may refer to:

== Places ==
- Killea, County Donegal, Ireland
- Killea, County Tipperary, Ireland

== People with the surname ==
- Lucy Killea (1932–2017), American politician
