= Templemore, Clonmore and Killea =

Catholic parish in Ireland

Church of the Sacred Heart
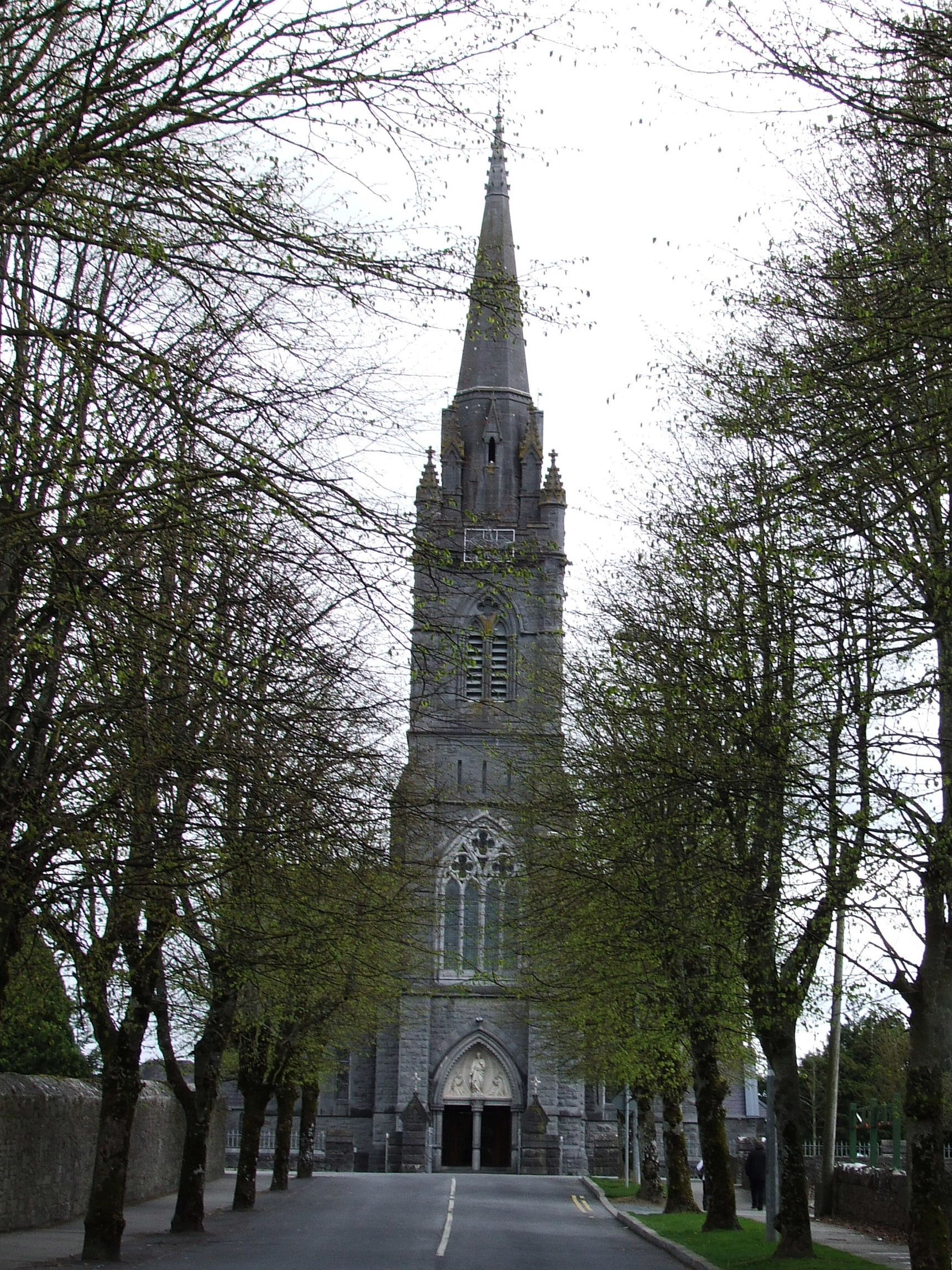
- Church of the Sacred Heart Templemore
- Church of the Sacred Heart
- 52°47′48″N 07°49′38″W
- Country: Ireland
- Denomination: Roman Catholic

History
- Founded: 1883

Architecture
- Architect: George Ashlin
- Style: Gothic Revival

Administration
- Diocese: Roman Catholic Archdiocese of Cashel and Emly
- Parish: Templemore, Clonmore and Killea

Templemore, Clonmore and Killea is an ecclesiastical parish in the Roman Catholic Archdiocese of Cashel and Emly. The parish includes the town of Templemore and the nearby villages of Clonmore and Killea in County Tipperary.

== Churches of the parish ==
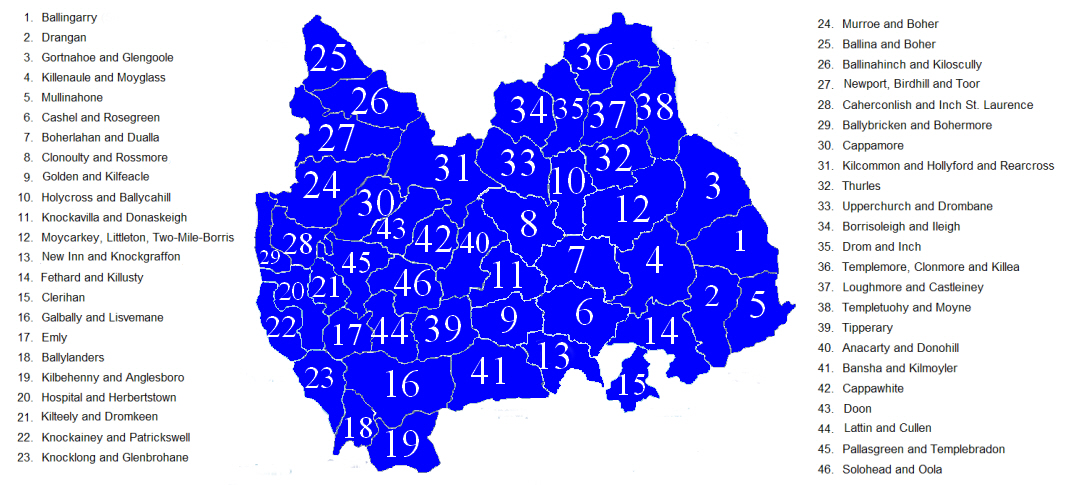
The parish, numbered 37, within the Archdiocese

Churches in the parish are:

- The Church of the Sacred Heart, Templemore
- St Anne's Church, Clonmore
- St James' Church, Killea.

== Church of the Sacred Heart ==
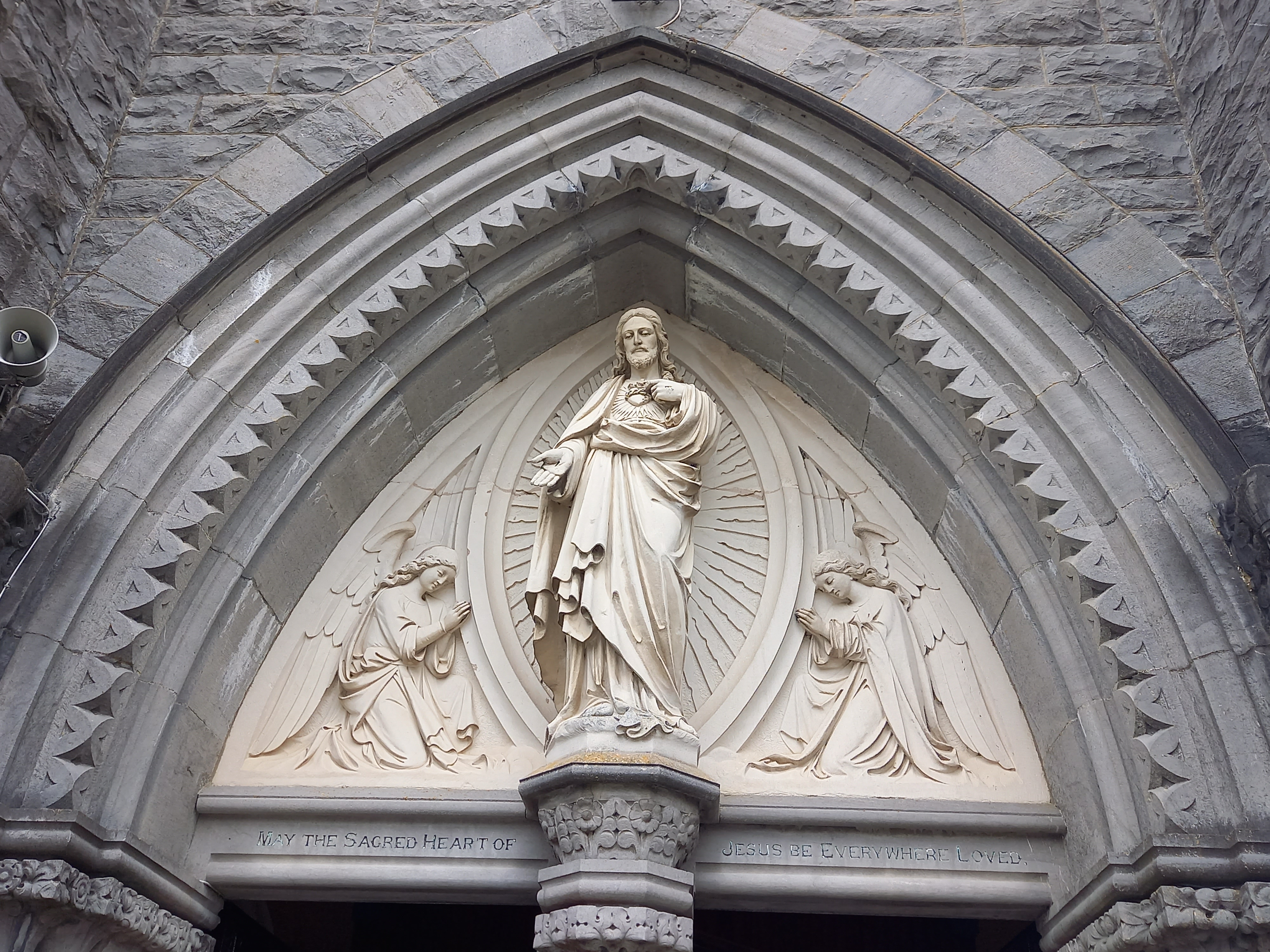
Tympanum of the church of the Sacred Heart

On 1 January 1877, the Archbishop of Cashel and Emly, Dr Thomas Croke, laid the foundation stone for the Church of the Sacred Heart. It was opened in 1883. This Gothic Revival church, designed by George Ashlin, is largely intact inside.

"This building has been erected to replace the old parish church, which was ruinous. It is built of dark limestone, with light yellowish freestone dressings. The nave columns are of Aberdeen granite, the remainder of the internal stonework being of local freestone. The width across nave and aisles is 48ft., and the length 120ft. The works are being carried out by day’s work, under Mr. Redmond as foreman. The cost will be about £4,000. The architect is Mr. G. E. Ashlin, Dublin."

The spire was not completed until 1905. It was built on the site of a former residential Erasmus Smith school. The first Mass in it was celebrated by Fr (later Canon) Meagher on Saturday 28 July 1883. The building formerly used as a church, at the south-eastern end of Main Street, was transformed in 1890 into a school and now forms the part of Our Lady's Secondary School situated immediately inside the entrance gate.

=== Design ===
The church was designed by George Ashlin, a prolific Irish architect known for building many churches and cathedrals throughout Ireland. It is built in a Gothic Revival style on the site of a former Erasmus Smith school. The land was donated by Sir John Craven Carden, Baronet of Templemore. The church is a detached building with a 3-stage tower and spire above the main entrance. The tower features gargoyles, sculpted pinnacles, and an ashlar limestone spire. The pitched roofs are slated with terracotta ridge cresting. Stained glass windows were designed and built by Franz Mayer & Co. and Earley and Company. There are 8 window bays along each side of the nave. There are 2 side aisles with gabled porches and 2-bay transepts. There is a half-octagonal apse. The sacristy lies to the southeast, with a side chapel at the northeast. The nave columns are of Aberdeen granite, the remainder of the internal stonework being of local freestone. The width across nave and aisles is 48 ft., and the length 120 ft.

== Religious institutions ==
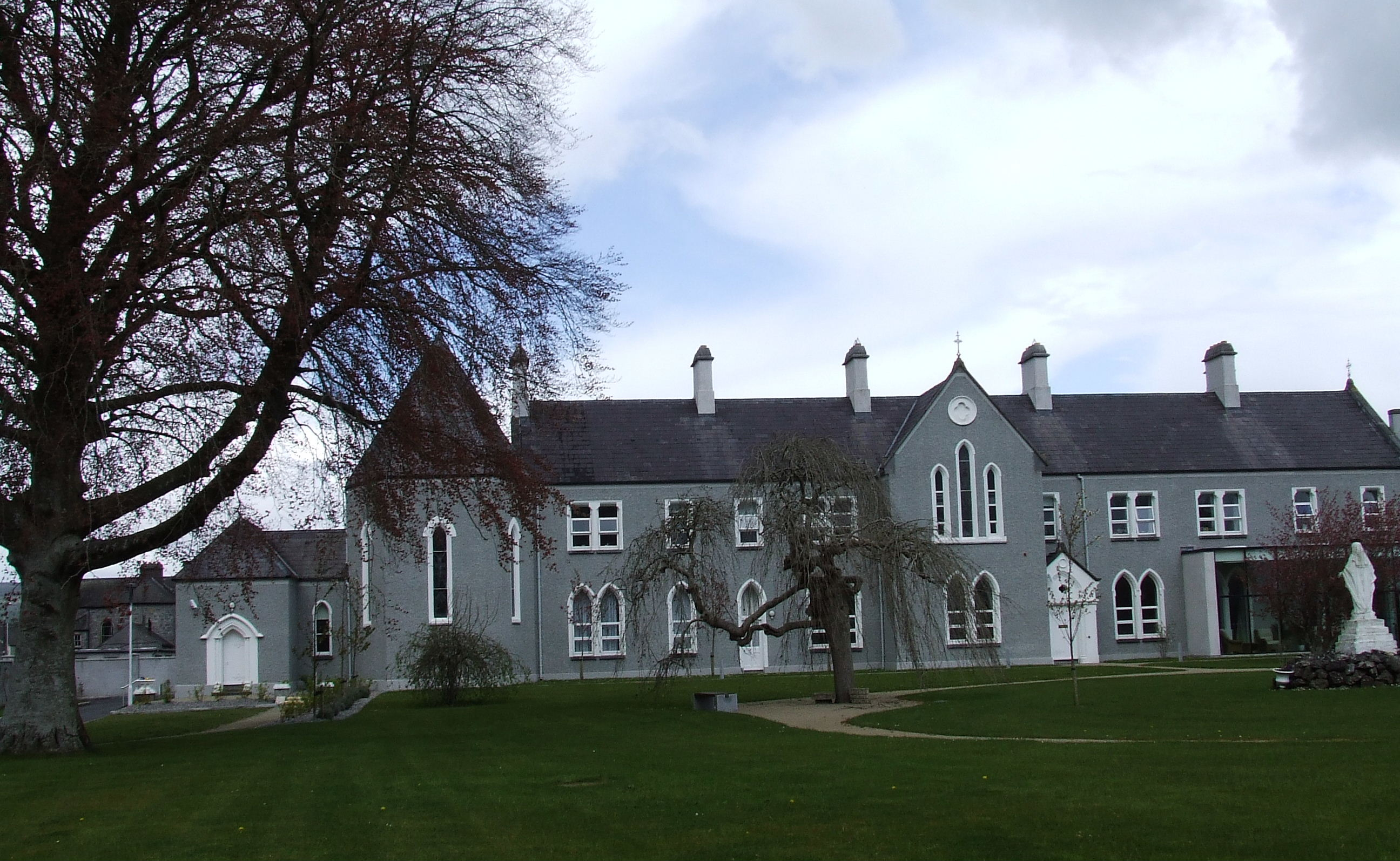
Convent of the Sisters of Mercy, April 2010

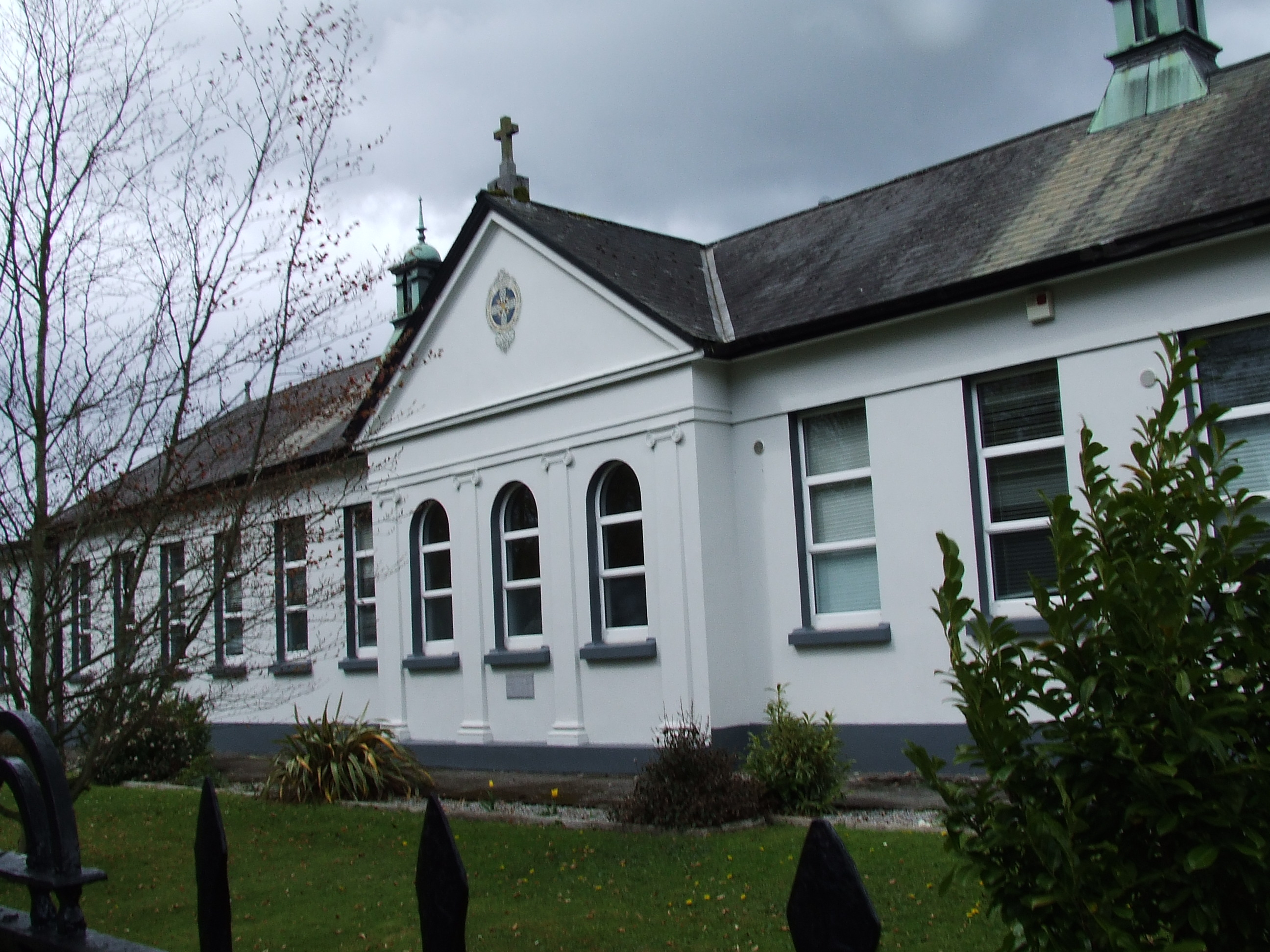
Christian Brothers School, April 2010

The Sisters of Mercy arrived in the town in 1863. Their convent is located at Church Avenue, Templemore. In the previous century, they provided a primary school (for girls) and a secondary school (for girls) both for day pupils and boarders. The sisters are no longer active in the teaching profession in the town.

The Christians Brothers community is no longer active in the teaching profession in the town. The monastery has been turned over to the parish for use as a Community Care Centre. In the 20th century, they provided a primary school (for boys) and a secondary school (for boys) on a day-pupil only basis.

The two secondary schools were merged in 1986 and now operate as Our Lady's Secondary School, Templemore.

The town cemetery was opened in 1861 and was consecrated by Archbishop Patrick Leahy.

== Sport ==
J.K. Bracken's GAC is the parish's Gaelic Athletic Association club.
