= 2002 in Irish television =

The following is a list of events relating to television in Ireland from 2002.

== Events ==
=== January ===
- 14 January – The drama series No Tears debuts on RTÉ Television. On the same day RTE 1 and Network 2 weather is remerged.
- 22 January – Following a deal with ITV Digital, UTV2 closes and is replaced by ITV2.
- March – Give Up Yer Aul Sins, an animated film produced for RTÉ Television by Brown Bag Films, is nominated for an Academy Award for Best Animated Short Film.

=== March ===
- 4 March – The long running Nickelodeon animated series SpongeBob SquarePants begins airing on Irish television for the first time on TG4.

=== June ===
- 6 June – Dermot Ahern is appointed Minister for Department of Communications, Marine and Natural Resources, with responsibility for broadcasting, responsibility for broadcasting having been transferred to this Department from the Department of Arts, Heritage, Gaeltacht and the Islands.

=== August ===
- 29 August – Report of the Forum on Broadcasting submitted to government.

=== October ===
- 27 October – You're a Star debuts on RTÉ Television. The programme is a text voting talent show to select Ireland's entry for that year's Eurovision Song Contest.

=== December ===
- 1 December – The Commission for Communications Regulation replaces the Office of the Director of Telecommunications Regulations as the overseer of media regulations in the Irish Republic.
- 27 December – BBC One Northern Ireland airs the 50th episode of its satirical comedy Give My Head Peace, which was filmed in Dublin.
- December – The television licence fee increases by €43, while the black-and-white licence fee abolished. The government establishes a mechanism to seek an annual increase in the fee, with a five-year review. There is also a commitment to introduce proposals for a commercial television licence fee.
- Undated – RTÉ Television and RTÉ Radio airs coverage of a Forum on Broadcasting being held at the Royal Hospital, Kilmainham in Dublin.
- 2002–2003 – RTÉ increases its international news coverage with reporters based in Baghdad, northern Iraq, Kuwait, Jordan and Jerusalem, as well as Washington and London correspondents.
- 2002–2005 – The RTÉ Strategic Plan is introduced.

== Debuts ==
=== RTÉ ===
- 14 January – No Tears (2002)
- 9 February – Hoze Houndz on RTÉ Two (1999–2003)
- 18 February - 24 on RTE Two (2001–2010)
- 12 March – Pecola on RTÉ Two (2001–2002)
- 15 March – Sheep in the Big City on RTÉ Two (2000–2002)
- March – Code Name: Eternity on RTÉ Two (2000)
- 1 April - Medabots on RTÉ Two (2000–2001)
- 11 April – Merlin the Magical Puppy on RTÉ Two (2001–2002)
- 24 April – Adventures of Papyrus on RTÉ Two (1998)
- 9 September – The Adventures of Jimmy Neutron: Boy Genius on RTÉ Two (2002–2006)
- 10 September – Tracey McBean on RTÉ Two (2002–2006)
- 10 September – Funny Little Bugs on RTÉ Two (2001)
- 11 September – Totally Spies! on RTÉ Two (2001–2013)
- 11 September – Binka on RTÉ Two (2001–2005)
- 11 September – Alias on RTÉ Two (2001–2006)
- 12 September – Don't Eat the Neighbours on RTÉ Two (2002)
- 4 October – Gadget & the Gadgetinis on RTÉ Two (2002–2003)
- 27 October – You're a Star on RTÉ One (2002–2008)
- 4 November – The Fairly OddParents! on RTÉ Two (2001–2017)
- Undated – What's with Andy? on RTÉ Two (2001–2007)
- Undated – The Osbournes on RTÉ Two (2002–2005)
- Undated – Any Time Now on RTÉ One (2002)
- Undated – The Invisible Man on RTÉ Two (2000–2002)
- Undated - The Education of Max Bickford (2001-2002)

=== TV3 ===
- 23 March – Harold and the Purple Crayon (2001–2002)
- 11 May – Phantom Investigators (2002)
- Undated – Futurama (1999–2013)
- Undated – Dan Dare: Pilot of the Future (2001)

=== TG4 ===
- 9 January – Cocco Bill (2001–2004)
- 4 March – SpongeBob SquarePants (1999–present)
- 2 September – Samurai Jack (2001–2004, 2017)
- 6 September – Justice League (2001–2004)
- 8 September – Spaced Out (2001–2005)
- Undated – The Nightmare Room (2001–2002)
- Undated – Glór Tíre (2002–present)

== Changes of network affiliation ==
Shows	Moved from	Moved to
Disney Cartoon Classics	Network 2	RTÉ 1
Mopatop's Shop	Network 2	RTÉ 1
Rocket Power	Network 2	RTÉ 1
Mike, Lu & Og	Network 2	RTÉ 1
Bananas in Pyjamas	Network 2	RTÉ 1
Fievel's American Tails	Network 2	RTÉ 1
Pecola	Network 2	RTÉ 1
Kipper	Network 2	RTÉ 1
Tweenies	Network 2	RTÉ 1
Barney & Friends	Network 2	RTÉ 1
Scooby-Doo, Where Are You!	Network 2	RTÉ 1
Batman	Network 2	RTÉ 1
Quack Pack	Network 2	RTÉ 1
Oggy and the Cockroaches	Network 2	RTÉ 1
The Adventures of Paddington Bear	Network 2	RTÉ 1
The Den	Network 2	RTÉ 1
Noah's Island	Network 2	RTÉ 1
George Shrinks	Network 2	RTÉ 1
Stingray	Network 2	RTÉ 1
A Pup Named Scooby-Doo	Network 2	RTÉ 1
Pepper Ann	Network 2	RTÉ 1
Little Bear	Network 2	RTÉ 1
The Pink Panther Show	Network 2	RTÉ 1
Teletubbies	Network 2	RTÉ 1
Disney Sunday	Network 2	RTÉ 1
Hoze Houndz	Network 2	RTÉ 1
Percy the Park Keeper	Network 2	RTÉ 1
The Moonkys	Network 2	RTÉ 1
Pip the Appleseed Knight	Network 2	RTÉ 1
Sheep in the Big City	Network 2	RTÉ 1
Cardcaptor Sakura	Network 2	RTÉ 1
Bear in the Big Blue House	Network 2	RTÉ 1
NASCAR Racers	Network 2	RTÉ 1
The New Woody Woodpecker Show	Network 2	RTÉ 1
I am Weasel	Network 2	RTÉ 1
Rugrats	Network 2	RTÉ 1
Redwall	Network 2	RTÉ 1
The Animals of Farthing Wood	Network 2	RTÉ 1
Fudge	Network 2	RTÉ 1
Bill and Ben	Network 2	RTÉ 1
The Powerpuff Girls	Network 2	RTÉ 1
The Morbegs	Network 2	RTÉ 1
Teenage Mutant Hero Turtles	Network 2	RTÉ 1
The Legend of Tarzan	Network 2	RTÉ 1

== Ongoing television programmes ==
=== 1960s ===
- RTÉ News: Nine O'Clock (1961–present)
- RTÉ News: Six One (1962–present)
- The Late Late Show (1962–present)

=== 1970s ===
- The Late Late Toy Show (1975–present)
- RTÉ News on Two (1978–2014)
- The Sunday Game (1979–present)

=== 1980s ===
- Dempsey's Den (1986–2010)
- Questions and Answers (1986–2009)
- Fair City (1989–present)
- RTÉ News: One O'Clock (1989–present)

=== 1990s ===
- Would You Believe (1990s–present)
- Winning Streak (1990–present)
- Prime Time (1992–present)
- No Disco (1993–2003)
- Nuacht RTÉ (1995–present)
- Fame and Fortune (1996–2006)
- Nuacht TG4 (1996–present)
- Ros na Rún (1996–present)
- A Scare at Bedtime (1997–2006)
- The Premiership/Premier Soccer Saturday (1998–2013)
- Sports Tonight (1998–2009)
- TV3 News (1998–present)
- Open House (1999–2004)
- Agenda (1999–2004)
- The View (1999–2011)
- Ireland AM (1999–present)
- Telly Bingo (1999–present)

=== 2000s ===
- Nationwide (2000–present)
- Bachelors Walk (2001–2003)
- TV3 News at 5.30 (2001–present)

== Ending this year ==
- 29 March – Who Wants to Be a Millionaire? (2000–2002)
- Undated – The Weakest Link (2001–2002)

== See also ==
- 2002 in Ireland
