= St. Augustine's Industrial School for Girls =

St. Augustine's Industrial School for Girls was an Industrial School run by the Sisters of Mercy in Templemore, County Tipperary, Ireland, from 1870 to 1965. It is sometimes referred to as an orphanage.

== History ==
The school was established on 20 August 1870 by the Sisters of Mercy who had opened a convent in Templemore in 1863. The school accommodated up to 70 girls. In 1901, the school was discussed in the House of Commons of the United Kingdom by John Cullinan, a Member of Parliament for South Tipperary. In 1919, the manager was noted as a Mrs. M. S. Heffernan. The school closed in 1964 or 1965.

The school had a choir which took part in the Loughmore Feis on 17 June 1935, singing songs in Irish.

The school was mentioned in Mary Raftery's 1999 book Suffer the Little Children: The Inside Story of Ireland's Industrial Schools, referring to the physical abuse that girls endured in the school. The school is included in the Residential Institutions Redress Act, 2002.

== Building ==
Situated on the corner of Mary Street and Templemore town square, it is adjacent to Our Lady's Secondary School, Templemore. St. Augustine's was originally constructed around 1815. The front façade faces onto the square, with eight bays forming an L-shaped block and a porch entrance. A long two-storey and single-storey façade overlooks Mary Street. As of 2020 it is in use as a funeral home and auctioneer. It is listed as 22308042 on the National Inventory of Architectural Heritage register of protected structures and Tipperary County Council reference TMS11.

== See also ==
- Commission to Inquire into Child Abuse
