= Garda Síochána College =

Irish police training college

- Coláiste an Gharda Síochána
- Other names: Garda College
- Former names: Garda Training Centre
- Motto: In Scientia Securitas
- Motto in English: In knowledge, safety
- Type: Police academy
- Established: 1964
- Religious affiliation: Non-denominational
- Academic affiliations: Association of European Police Colleges
- Location: Templemore, Munster, County Tipperary, Ireland; 52°47.5′N 7°50.5′W
- Campus: Urban
- Language: English, Irish
- Colours: Blue and white
- Website: www.garda.ie/en/careers/the-garda-college/

The Garda Síochána College is the education and training college of the Garda Síochána (Irish police service). It is located at McCan Barracks, Templemore, County Tipperary in Ireland. The college has been in Templemore since 1964.

== History ==
The training role was previously undertaken at Garda Headquarters (in the Phoenix Park, Dublin). When in February 1964 training moved to McCan Barracks, it became known as the Garda Training Centre, or locally as the depot. In 1992 the Garda College was designated an Institute of Higher Education by the National Council for Education Awards (NCEA). More recently the BA in Applied Policing is awarded by the University of Limerick.

== Training approach development ==
Student Garda epaulette

The training programme for Recruit Gardaí initially offered at Templemore remained similar to that conducted in the Phoenix Park, which provided for 18 weeks training before being allocated to a Garda Station. After one year "on the job" each Recruit Garda returned to Templemore for a one-month "refresher course". The training was extended to 22 weeks in the late 1970s. The subjects studied were Police Duties, Irish, and Physical Studies (consisting of Physical Training, Drill, Swimming, and First Aid).

Following a major examination of all training in the Garda Síochána, a new two-year Student/Probationer Education/Training Programme was introduced for trainee Gardaí in April 1989. A major building programme saw the facilities developed and modernised and the name of the institution changed from the Garda Training Centre to the Garda College.

In 1992, the Garda College was designated by the Minister for Education as an institution which the National Council for Educational Awards (NCEA) could accredit. The following year, the two-year Student/Probationer Education/Training Programme was accredited by the NCEA with the award of a National Diploma in Police Studies. A more recent initiative saw the development of a Bachelor of Arts (Police Management) degree for Garda Officers of Superintendent rank upwards.

== Courses offered ==
Two main courses are available, both conferred by the Higher Education and Training Awards Council:

- Bachelor of Arts (in Police Studies): for fresh recruits. The entry requirements are mainly age, character, citizenship, education and health-based, and competitions for entry are advertised periodically, usually annually.
- Bachelor of Arts (in Police Management): for senior officers. The entry requirement is to be a senior manager at superintendent or officer grade. The course's main function is to develop those members with additional skills. For a period this course was delivered off-campus, at a hotel in Nenagh, County Tipperary, due to more space being needed for the training of new recruits.

Candidates with other qualifications, particularly technical, may be considered for specific positions where a technical skill set is a prerequisite. This is usually for computer, finance and fraud-based branches and investigations.

Various other specialist courses are available for serving force members.

== College Facilities ==
Following a major building programme in 2001, the college has the capacity to accommodate 520 persons. The college has expanded its education facilities and included in the new development are three lecture theatres. The Garda College has its own nine-hole golf course with a clubhouse and leisure facility. It also has three tennis courts – designed and floodlit to meet international championship standards. In addition the sports field complex comprises full size Gaelic games, soccer and rugby pitches as well as a modern pavilion with changing Rooms, first aid room, weights room and facilities for officials.

Campus facilities include a social club, indoor sports hall with two squash courts and a separate handball alley, a 25-metre swimming pool, fully equipped gymnasium with accompanying leisure facilities.

The Education Block is purpose-built to provide for the education/training requirements of a modern police service. In addition to the technological facilities available, there is also a 'Scenes of Crime Room', a 'Mock' Garda Station, courtroom, language laboratory, classroom facilities and a library containing over 12,000 books.

== Awards ==
Probationer Gardaí are recognised for effort and endeavour throughout the two-year programme and on graduation day the following medals are awarded:

The Gary Sheehan Memorial Medal

The Gary Sheehan Memorial Medal commemorates Recruit Garda Gary Sheehan, killed on duty at Ballinamore, County Leitrim on 16 December 1983, and is awarded to the best all-round probationer. The recipient will have contributed significantly to life at the Garda College, distinguished himself/herself in the academic field and will have made a significant contribution to the stations and communities in which he/she served. Additionally, the winner will have, by the initiative shown, and leadership qualities so obviously displayed during the training period, won the respect of his/her peers and authorities.

The Commissioner's Medal

The Commissioner's Medal is awarded to the Student achieving the highest aggregate marks in academic subjects over Phase I, III and V Education/Training. The winner will have excelled in Legal, Policing and Technical Studies, the Social Sciences, Communications, Physical Education Studies, Gaeilge and Dissertation.

The Templemore Town Council Medal

The Templemore Town Council Medal is awarded to the student who throughout the Student/Probationer Education/Training Course has demonstrated insight and imagination in his/her approach to the Social Science Studies Course and has displayed, through innovative and practical involvement in the social affairs of the communities, within which he/she serves, an appreciation of the key social role of the Gardaí at local and/or national level. The winner will also have distinguished himself/herself academically in the Social Science Studies course.

== Entry ==
The recruitment process is by means of a competition where the highest ranked applicants progress to the next stage. The first step is registration with the Public Appointments Service. When the recruitment campaign begins, the applicant is notified and requested to complete an online application form. The applicant will then be invited to book a time and date for the Stage I Aptitude Test. This test consists of three parts: a Skills/Experience Questionnaire, an Analytical Reasoning test and a Job Simulation Exercise. Successful applicants from Stage I will be asked to fill in an application form for Stage II. They will then be given a date and time for interview. The interview stage will consist of three parts: an Interview, a Report Writing Exercise and a Verbal Evaluation Test. Successful applicants will then be requested to fill in a form for their Background checks. Applicants if successful will be asked to participate in a Medical Examination and finally a PCT (Physical Competence Test). Applicants who pass all stages and who are deemed to be acceptable by the Garda Commissioner, will be offered a position as a member of the Garda Síochána.

== Access ==
The main artery to the town of Templemore is the N62 National route. Travelling north on this route from Templemore connects to the main Dublin-Limerick motorway (M7 – Junction 22) and Roscrea. Travelling south on the route connects to Thurles and then the main Dublin-Cork motorway (M8 / N8 – Junction 6 Horse and Jockey). The N62 originates in Athlone. The college is accessible off N62 in Templemore at southern end of Templemore (towards Thurles).

To the east, the R433 connects Templemore to the M8 / N8 at a more northerly point (Junction 3) via the villages of Clonmore and Errill and the town of Rathdowney in County Laois. Alternatively, the motorway may be accessed via the village of Templetuohy. To the west, the R501, tracking the Devil's Bit mountain range, goes to Borrisoleigh.

Templemore railway station is on the Dublin-Cork railway line operated by Iarnród Éireann. There are direct trains to and from stations like Dublin Heuston railway station (8 trains avg), Thurles (9 trains avg) Cork (4 trains avg) and Limerick (4 trains avg) daily. The college is approximately 2 km from Templemore railway station.

== See also ==
- The Garda College Museum and Visitor Centre which operated from 2002 to 2020 at the Garda Síochána College.
- Garda Síochána
- Education in the Republic of Ireland
- Templemore
- McCan Barracks
- RCMP Academy, Depot Division
- FBI Academy
- County Tipperary
