= Carden baronets of Templemore (1787) =

Escutcheon of the Carden baronets of Templemore

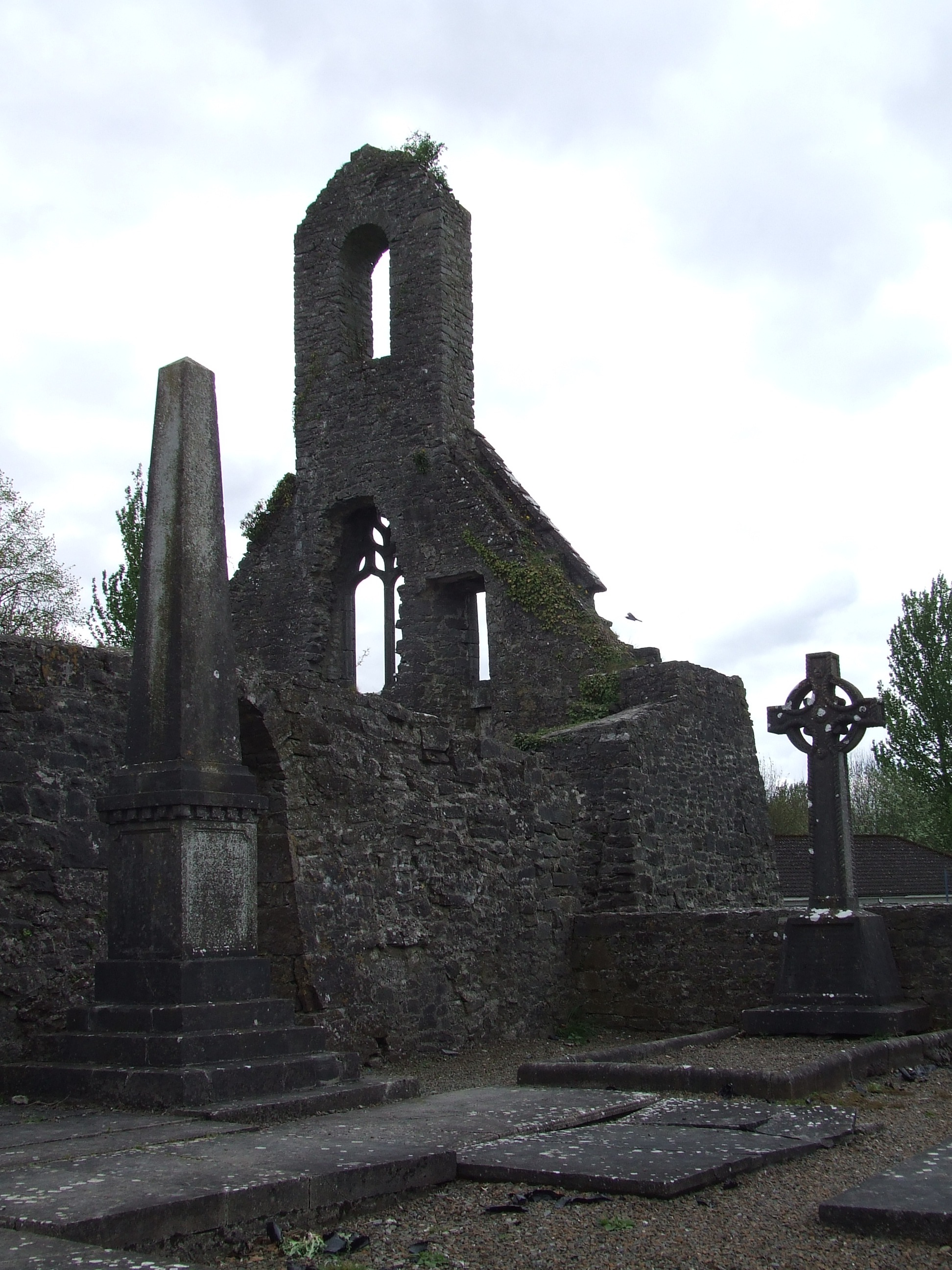
Carden family tombs: obelisk and gravestones of the "Big Church" in Templemore

The Carden baronetcy, of Templemore in the County of Tipperary, was created in the Baronetage of Ireland on 31 August 1787 for John Carden, commander of the 30th Regiment of Light Dragoons, which he had helped raise.

His son from his third marriage, the 3rd Baronet who succeeded his half-brother, fought at the Battle of Waterloo in 1815. The 6th Baronet was a tank and vehicle designer.

The title is marked "dormant" on the Official Roll.

== Carden baronets, of Templemore (1787) ==
- Sir John Craven Carden, 1st Baronet (c. 1758–1820)
- Sir Arthur Carden, 2nd Baronet (1778–1822)
- Sir Henry Robert Carden, 3rd Baronet (1789–1847)
- Sir John Craven Carden, 4th Baronet (1819–1879)
- Sir John Craven Carden, 5th Baronet (1854–1931)
- Sir John Valentine Carden, 6th Baronet (1892–1935)
- Sir John Craven Carden, 7th Baronet (1926–2008)
- Sir John Craven Carden, 8th Baronet (1953–2021)
- Sir Patrick John Cameron Carden, 9th Baronet (born 1988)

The heir presumptive is Peter James Charles Carden (born 1958), a kinsman of the present holder.

== Seat ==
The family seat was Templemore Abbey, built 1819 by architect William Vitruvius Morrison in the Tudor-Gothic style, extended in the 1860s, vacated in 1902. It was used by the Auxiliary Division and was burnt down in June 1921.

== Extended family ==
Admiral John Surman Carden (1771–1858) was a member of another branch of the Templemore family.
