= Erasmus Smith =

English philanthropist, merchant and landowner

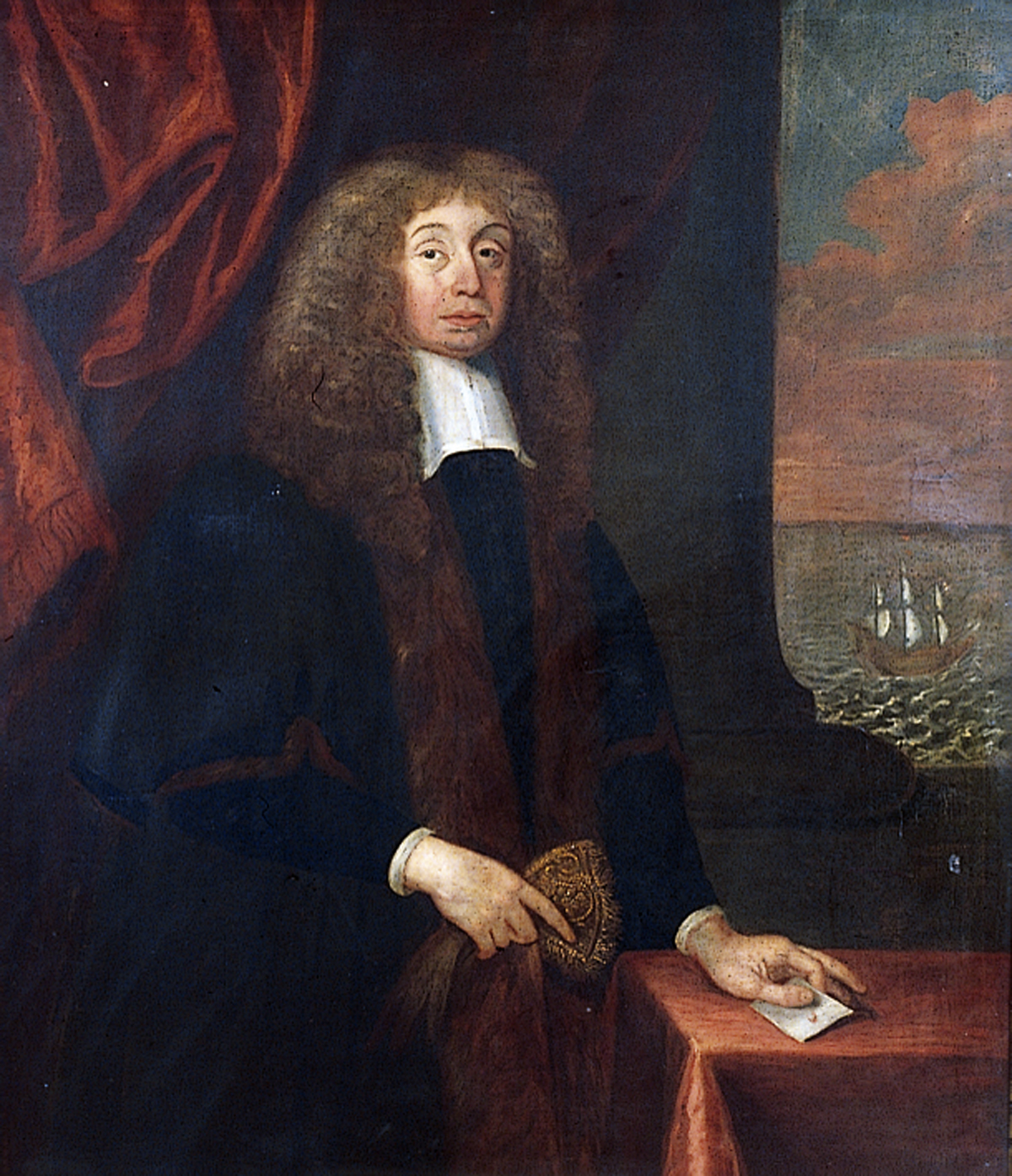
Erasmus Smith, attributed to the circle of John Michael Wright

Erasmus Smith (1611–1691) was an English merchant and a landowner with possessions in England and Ireland. Having acquired significant wealth through trade and land transactions, he became a philanthropist in the sphere of education, treading a path between idealism and self-interest during a period of political and religious turbulence. His true motivations remain unclear.

Smith's family owned manors in Leicestershire and held Protestant beliefs. He became a merchant, supplying provisions to the armies of the Puritan Oliver Cromwell – during Cromwell's suppression of rebellion in Ireland — and an alderman of the City of London. His financial and landowning status was greatly enhanced by benefiting from his father's subscription to the Adventurers' Act from which he gained extensive landholdings in Ireland as a reward, and from his own speculative practice of buying additional subscriptions from other investors.

During the period of Cromwell's rule and the subsequent Restoration, Smith manoeuvred to protect his position and to further his essentially Puritan religious stance, which he modified to suit the religious sensibilities of the new Royalist regime. He achieved this in part by creating an eponymous trust whereby some of his Irish property was used for the purpose of financing the education of children and provided scholarships for the most promising of those to continue their studies at Trinity College, Dublin. However, there have been claims that this trust was intended primarily to protect his interests in land, of which some was obtained by dubious interpretation of law.

== Background ==
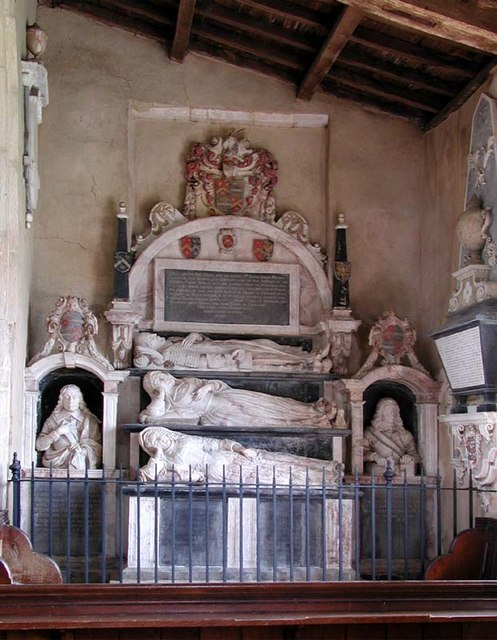
The tomb of Sir Roger Smith at the church of St Michael and All Angels, Edmondthorpe. The figures to either side are his two sons, and the two figures reclining with him are his two wives.

Erasmus Smith was born in 1611 and baptised on 8 April of that year at Husbands Bosworth, Leicestershire. He was the second son of Roger Smith and his second wife, Anna (née Goodman). The family had changed their name to Smith from Heriz (or Harris) when they inherited the manor of Edmondthorpe during the reign of Henry VII, and it was Erasmus's paternal grandfather, also called Erasmus, who had bought the manor of Husbands Bosworth in 1565. Henry "Silver-tongued" Smith, the Puritan preacher, was an uncle of Erasmus, and his maternal grandfather, Thomas Goodman, was a wealthy London merchant.

The contacts of Thomas Goodman enabled Erasmus to serve a seven-year apprenticeship in London with a poultry merchant, John Saunders, and he was made a freeman of the Grocers' Company on 10 February 1635. By 1631 Roger Smith had become an alderman of the City of London and in 1635 he was knighted; Erasmus followed in his father's footsteps, being elected an alderman in 1657, (Note: Smith was elected alderman for the Billingsgate ward of the City of London.) but preferred to pay a fine of £420 in order to be released from the duties of office. In these early years he was also unwilling to have much involvement in the business of the Grocers' Company, although this changed later in life: the cause of his initial reluctance may have been his preference to concentrate on acquiring his wealth. According to the records of the Aldermen of the City of London, Erasmus was Member of Parliament for Ardee in County Louth between 1665 and 1666.

== Acquisition of lands in Ireland ==
In July 1642 Roger Smith subscribed £225 under the terms of the Adventurers' Act 1640, whereby money loaned to the government of Charles I for the purpose of suppressing the Irish rebellion was secured by lands to be confiscated in that country. The lands had been confiscated in law but it would require the overthrow of the rebels in order to realise those property assets. The subsequent Doubling Ordinance of 1643 allowed those who had subscribed to receive twice the amount of land if they added a further 25 per cent of their initial financial aid: Roger Smith accepted those terms, contributing a further £75 in July 1643 and then two more payments of £75 in August and in October of that year. (Note: Another amendment caused the land grants to be made in Irish acres rather than statute acres, which boosted the area of land eventually obtained by 62%. 1.000 Irish acre (1.620 acres).)

Erasmus Smith had become a "Turkey merchant". (Note: The phrase Turkey merchant is used by the Oxford Dictionary of National Biography and by Michael Quane, the historian, among others. There is some ambiguity regarding its meaning. Given his apprenticeship in the poultry business, it may refer to trade in the bird but according to Trinity College, Dublin it refers to trade with the country of that name. Wallace is silent on the issue, referring to Smith simply as a "merchant".) He was a Protestant and, like his father, by 1650 he was supplying foodstuffs (Note: The precise foodstuffs supplied is uncertain. For example, Champion refers to "cheese, oats and flour", Wallace says wheat, rye and oatmeal, and the 1897 edition of the Oxford Dictionary of National Biography states oatmeal, wheat and cheese.) to Oliver Cromwell's armies in the civil wars of that time. This applied in particular to military activities in Ireland, where the rebellion of 1641 was believed by him and others to have resulted in part from a failure of education in that country.

W. J. R. Wallace, in his history of Smith and the eponymous Trust, notes that the first record of Erasmus being in Ireland is from 1648 and that

Erasmus was clearly a businessman first and foremost; any attempt to put him into a political stereotype as a Roundhead and then accuse him of political double-dealing seems inaccurate.

By the time that the rebellion was suppressed in 1653, and just prior to the first assignments of land under the terms of the Settlement of Ireland Act, 1652, Roger had registered the transfer of his investment to Erasmus. (Note: Historian Michael Quane dismisses earlier claims that Erasmus Smith had personal experience of military service and that he was one of the original Adventurers. He does, however, claim that the transfer of entitlements from Roger to his son took place in 1643.) Erasmus had speculated by buying out the interests of other subscribers, who had tired of the delay in seeing a reward from their investment; and he was also entitled to further land grants in payment for his supplies to the army. What began as a grant of 666 acres (270 ha) eventually became — by the 1680s, after various wranglings and adjustments — over 46,000 acres (19,000 ha) situated in nine counties, and Erasmus had an estimated worth of £120,000. (Note: The varied location of the lands was in part a consequence of allocations being made by the drawing of lots; the final determination took some years because of various legal challenges, including from people who had been dispossessed. By 1669 he had possession of over 37,000 acres (15,000 ha). In addition to the £375 of debentures given by his father, he had spent £13,082. Many soldiers were entitled to land but, because they were poor and illiterate, it was possible to buy up interests for as little as 20 per cent of face value. Although Robert Smith had spent £450 on the debentures, only £375 were transferred because one receipt for £75 was mislaid.) Some of these lands, notably those in Connaught, may have been obtained fraudulently by Erasmus, who together with his nephew Edward Smith, sat on the committee based at Grocers' Hall whose purpose was the allocation of lots for the distribution of land between the debenture holders. Edward Smith was subsequently appointed to a Court of Claims in Dublin, where he may also have favoured his uncle Erasmus in his applications for land.

== Philanthropy ==
=== Ireland ===
Although Smith visited Dublin while overseeing his land purchases, he had no desire actually to live in Ireland. In 1655 – the year that his father died – he proposed that some of the profits from his Irish lands should be used to support five Protestant schools for boys. A Trust was established for this purpose in 1657, in relation to which Smith and the Grocers' Company had various powers of oversight. There were 18 trustees, the principal of whom was Henry Jones, who was soon to become Protestant Bishop of Meath. There have been various suggestions since at least the 19th century that creating the trust may not have been an altruistic act but rather one intended to curry favour and counter any possible legal challenges to holdings over which he had a tenuous claim, such as those obtained in Connaught. Writing in 1824, Hely Dutton said in his Statistical Survey of County Galway that

Well knowing that his titles and tenures were very precarious, and liable at a future period to be litigated, he very cunningly made a grant of lands for the founding and endowment of Protestant schools, and other charitable purposes, for which he [later, in 1669] obtained a Charter ... appointing the bench of bishops, the lord chancellor, the judges, the great law officers, all for the time being, governors and trustees; well knowing that if any flaw should ever appear in the patents, titles or tenures, under which he got the estates, the law officers would always protect and make the title good to his heirs.

The Trust initially encompassed 3,381 acres (1,368 ha) of his land. In keeping with his religious views, the schools were to teach their pupils "fear of God and good literature and to speak the English tongue", and both prayers and catechism (in the style of the Presbyterian Assembly of Divines) were compulsory. Those pupils who showed particular promise were to have the opportunity of taking up scholarships at Trinity College, Dublin.

His plans for the Trust were, however, overtaken by events. Cromwell died in 1658 and Smith's arrangements were not entirely acceptable to the new regime. (Note: One particular issue was the composition of the board of trustees, which included many people whose religious sentiment was not in accord with the changed environment, especially with the restoration of the Church of Ireland as the Established Church in January 1661.) The Restoration period, which began around 1660 and saw Charles II become king, was not sympathetic to the Puritan beliefs of the Cromwellian Interregnum. Nonetheless, Smith's venture was able to survive the political upheaval and change in moral tone, albeit in modified form. That it did so was largely due to his wealth and connections, but also because the educational purpose for which his lands were being used was clearly beneficial and because he engaged in many lawsuits in order to protect both his own interests and those of family and friends. Referred to by his enemies as "pious Erasmus with the golden purse", Smith came to an arrangement in 1667 which reduced the number of schools to three and required that he give £100 annually to one of Charles's favourite institutes, Christ's Hospital. The terms stipulated that although the schools were to be for the free education of children of Smith's tenants, they should each provide education on similar terms to a further 20 children from poor families, and that additional children could be schooled at a charge not to exceed two shillings.

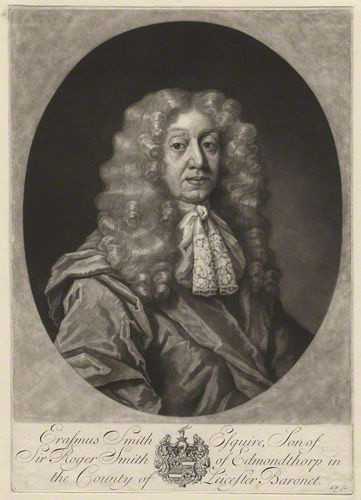
Erasmus Smith (1611–1691), by George White (ca. 1684–1732), after an earlier mezzotint picture

Wallace argues that Smith

adapted to the different versions of Protestantism which were favoured by successive governments during the Commonwealth and the Restoration. Since these did not involve denial of any of the fundamentals of his faith, the changes were probably not too painful. He retained his sympathy for the Puritan divines of his youth to the end of his life, as witnessed by some of the bequests in his will.

A Royal Charter was granted to the Trust in 1669. This stipulated its name to be The Governors of the Schools Founded by Erasmus Smith, Esq. and provided for a seal bearing the words "We are faithful to our Trust". By 1675, the new board of 32 trustees had around £600 per annum available to them from the landholdings; by the first quarter of the 18th century this had risen to £1100. Free schools were established in Templemore, Galway and Drogheda. Funding was also given to another school, in Dublin: the recently founded King's Hospital School benefited from the trust's interest by being provided with twenty scholarships at Trinity College and also apprenticeships. The trust also funded a lectureship in Hebrew at the college, and arrangements were in place to that any surplus funds generated were used for purposes such as clothing the poor children in the grammar schools and arranging apprenticeships.

=== England ===
During his lifetime, the Irish schools were not as successful as Smith had anticipated. He and others attributed this to the resentment shown by Catholics, and there was also resentment from those charged with sending Irish rent money to England's Christ's Hospital.

The arrangement by which an annual grant was given to Christ's Hospital corresponded with Smith's own interests in that institution. The hospital had for many years enjoyed close links with various Livery Companies and Smith had become a Governor there in 1658. The aftermath of the Great Fire of London in 1666, as a consequence of which the hospital was destroyed, demonstrated his interest. He wrote that

Providence sometime after the fire directed me to view the Hospital which with grief I beheld in its ashes. The consideration of the many children that had their habitation there but then scattered abroad, made me resolve to encourage others with myself to raise the foundation.

Smith was a benefactor during the period of reconstruction. He became frustrated that, during a time when the hospital was so clearly in need of financial assistance, the trustees of his Irish munificence were choosing to procrastinate in their remittances of the annual grant. By the mid-1670s he had determined to use the powers granted to him under the terms of the Royal Charter in order to divert surplus funds from the Trust to the hospital, and by 1681 relations between Smith and the trustees were so strained that both the governments in London and in Dublin were involved in attempts to determine who had responsibility both for the administration and collection of income and for the distribution thereof. One such involved person was Sir John Temple, the Solicitor-General for Ireland, who asserted that anomalies between the stipulations of 1667 and the Charter of 1669 showed that the revenue should stay in Ireland, and also that there was in fact no surplus available in any event because the Trust had not at that time met with all of its responsibilities in Ireland under the terms of the Charter.

Various parties then engaged in legal actions and in petitions to both Charles II and his successor from 1685, James II. With the added complication of James II being overthrown by William of Orange, the dispute remained unresolved at the time of Smith's death.

== Death and legacy ==
Smith married Mary Hare, the 20-year-old daughter of Hugh Hare, the 1st Baron Coleraine, in 1670 when he was 59. The couple had nine children, five of whom were baptised in Clerkenwell, where he had lived at St John's Court for many years.

In 1683 he bought the manor of Hamerton, Huntingdonshire, in the parish church of which he was buried, next to his wife, upon his death sometime between 25 August and 9 October 1691. (Note: On 25 August 1691 Smith added a codicil to his will of 6 May 1690. This very detailed document is discussed by Wallace at some length.) He had also bought Weald Hall in 1685.

Smith's six sons and three daughters mostly died young. One, Hugh Smith, inherited Weald and Hamerton from his older siblings in 1732 and appointed his two daughters as co-heirs. One of those daughters, Lucy, married into the Stanley family. Her husband changed his surname to become James Smith-Stanley, Lord Strange, and the couple were the parents of Edward Smith-Stanley, 12th Earl of Derby.

As of 2025, the Erasmus Smith Trust continues to operate on the grounds of The High School Dublin, having been opened at that school on April 26th 2002 by Former Taoiseach Dr Garret FitzGerald. The chief archivist as of 2025 is Alan Phelan.

== Recognition ==
Four professorships at Trinity College are named after him:

- Erasmus Smith's Chair of Natural and Experimental Philosophy (established 1724)
- Erasmus Smith's Chair of Hebrew (1724)
- Erasmus Smith's Chair of Modern History (1762)
- Erasmus Smith's Chair of Mathematics (1762)
