= Killea, County Tipperary =

Killea Cill Aodha
- Village
- Location in Ireland
- Coordinates: 52°49′24″N 7°52′26″W
- Country: Ireland
- Province: Munster
- County: County Tipperary

Government
  - Dáil Éireann: Tipperary
- Time zone: UTC+0 (WET)
  - Summer (DST): UTC-1 (IST (WEST))

Killea (Irish: Cill Aodha) is a village in County Tipperary, Ireland. The village lies off the N62 road, 5 km from Templemore. It is one of eleven civil parishes in the historical barony of Ikerrin. It is also part of the ecclesiastical parish of Templemore, Clonmore and Killea in the Roman Catholic Archdiocese of Cashel and Emly. The local Gaelic Athletic Association club is Cill Aodha.

== Education ==
Killea National School is a co-educational primary school, founded in 1895. Originally housed in a three-roomed building, the school was later transferred to a new building. As of January 2009, the school serves 32 pupils.

== Village church ==
Killea (Cill Aodh – literally the church founded by Aodh) gets its name from the 5th-century church established by Aodh, a disciple of Saint Declan of Ardmore, but the ruined church now visible is of medieval origin.

There has been a Catholic church in the village since at least the 13th century, as noted in the Papal taxation list of parishes of 1302-1306, and in a later list from 1437. Remnants of the original chapel can be seen in the village's old church cemetery. In 1832, the current church St. James' Church of Killea was built, with the foundation stone laid by Reverend Patrick Fant, parish priest of Templemore. Reverend William Heffernan was chosen to oversee construction of the church. At the time, Saint James was particularly popular in the area and had a dedicated well in nearby Kilkip to which sick people travelled on his feast day.

== See also ==
- List of civil parishes of County Tipperary
- List of towns and villages in the Republic of Ireland
