= Togher, County Louth =

Civil parish in County Louth, Ireland

Coordinates: 53.839°N 6.302°W

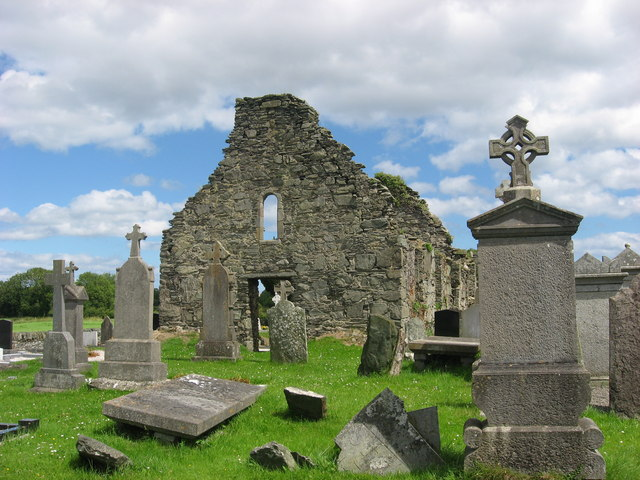
Church ruins at Clonmore, County Louth

Togher (Irish: An Tóchar, meaning 'causeway') is a large parish in County Louth, Ireland. A rural parish in the Roman Catholic Archdiocese of Armagh, Togher is situated approximately halfway between Drogheda and Dundalk.

Togher lies on the east coast of County Louth and has approximately 5 miles (8 km) of coastline stretching from its border with Clogherhead Parish at the Skinore River in the south to Annagassan bridge in the north, where it adjoins the parish of Drumiskin. Its inland boundaries are the parishes of Kilsaran, Dunleer and Clogherhead. Togher is an amalgamation of six medieval parishes (Clonmore, Port, Dysart, Dunany, Salterstown and Drumcar), and to the present day the ruins of these six parish churches stand within the parish of Togher. The leading Anglo-Norman family of Verdon were the main landowners here until the late fourteenth century, when their estates passed by inheritance to the Cruys or Cruise family from Dublin.

The local Gaelic Athletic Association club, Naomh Fionbarra, is located close to Annagassan within Ballygassan townland. As of 2016, the club's senior team were competing at intermediate level, having won the Louth Junior Championship final in 2015.

Schools within the Togher area include St. Finians N.S. (located in the Salterstown parish) and St. Colmcilles N.S. (located in Dysart parish).
