= Clonmore, County Tipperary =

Clonmore An Chluain Mhór
- Village
- Location in Ireland
- Coordinates: 52°49′47″N 7°45′58″W
- Country: Ireland
- Province: Munster
- County: County Tipperary

Clonmore (Irish: An Chluain Mhór) is a village and townland in County Tipperary, Ireland. It lies on the R433 road 6 km from Templemore and 7 km from Errill in County Laois. It is part of the parish of Templemore, Clonmore and Killea. The local Roman Catholic church is dedicated to Saint Ann and was built in 1832.

The Gaelic Athletic Association club is J.K. Bracken's GAC.

== See also ==
- List of towns and villages in Ireland
