= Templemore railway station =

Station in County Tipperary, Ireland

Templemore An Teampall Mór
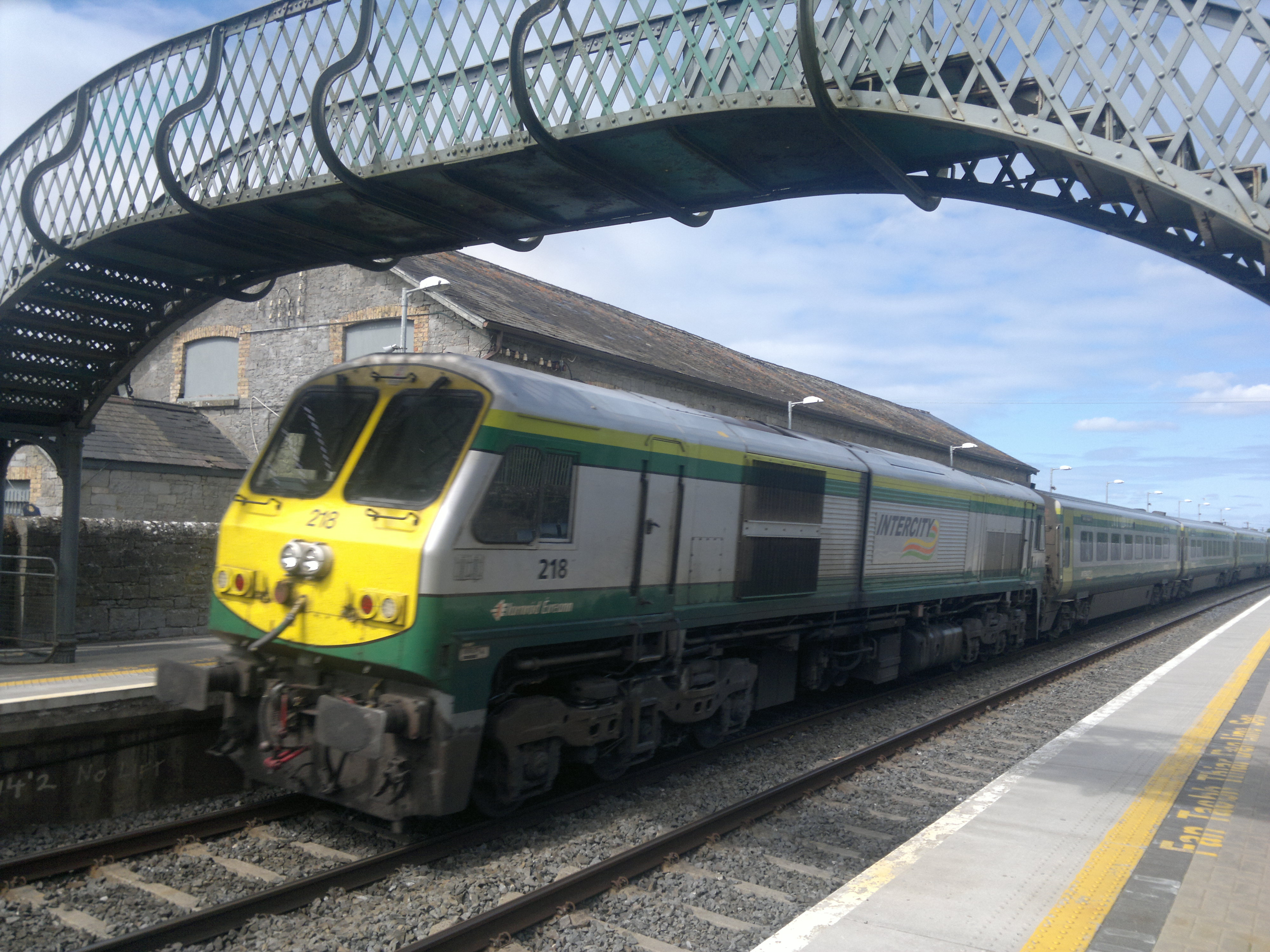
- Cork-Dublin Train on Platform 1 Templemore

General information
- Location: Railway Road, Templemore; County Tipperary, E41 NF79; Ireland
- Coordinates: 52°47′25″N 7°49′16″W
- Owner: Iarnród Éireann
- Operator: Iarnród Éireann
- Platforms: 2

Construction
- Structure type: At-grade

Key dates
- 3 July 1848: Station opens
Location

Templemore railway station is a mainline railway station situated 2 km from the town of Templemore, Ireland. The station is on the Dublin-Cork railway line.

== Details ==
The station has two platforms, and is fully accessible to wheelchair users since the addition of lifts at each end of a footbridge.

The station is approximately 2 km from the Garda Síochána College (main police training centre for Ireland).

== History ==
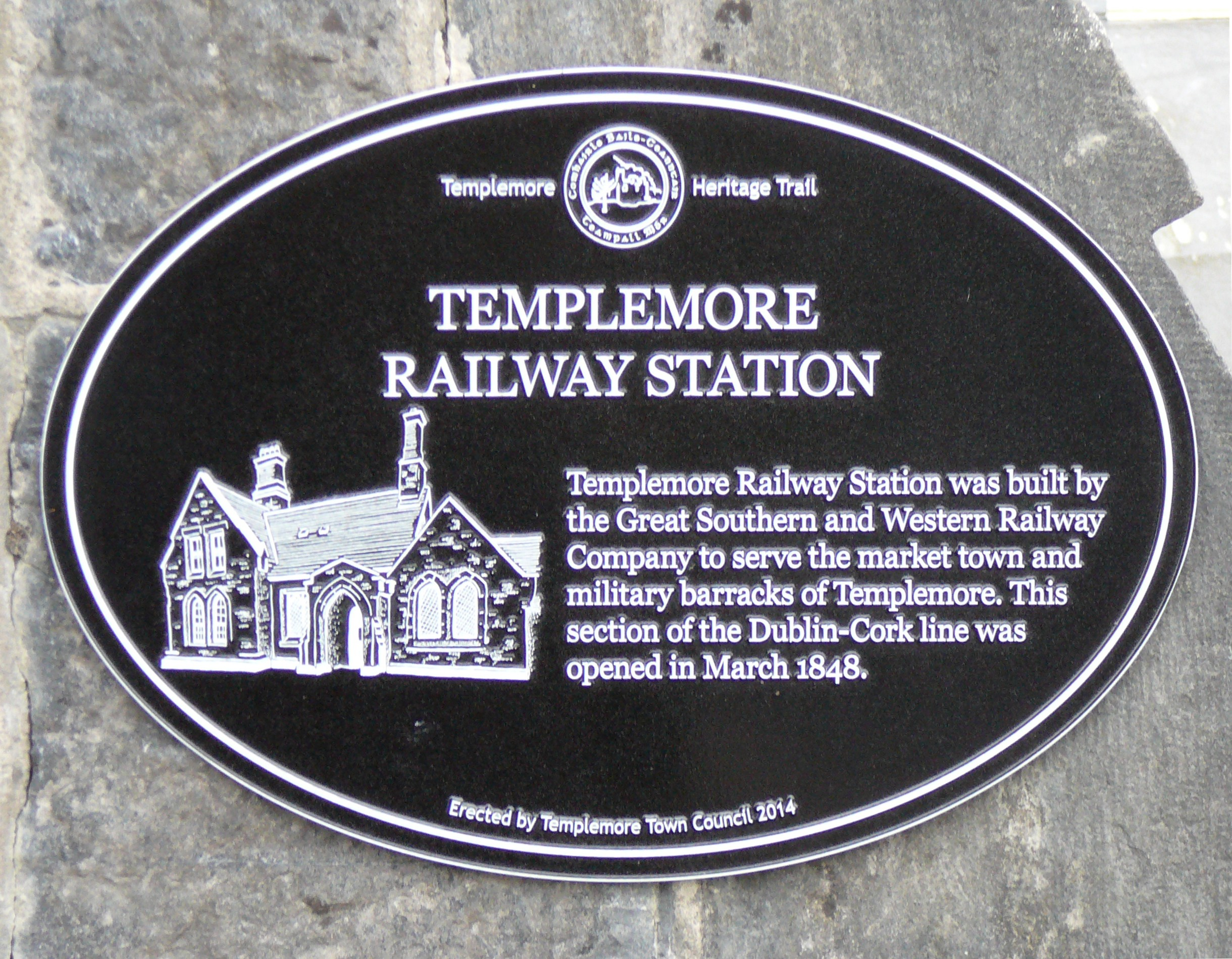
Templemore Railway Station plaque

The station opened on 3 July 1848.

== Services ==
Preceding station	Iarnród Éireann	Following station
Ballybrophy	Intercity; Dublin-Cork railway line	Thurles

== See also ==
- List of railway stations in Ireland
