= Thurles railway station =

Station in County Tipperary, Ireland

Thurles Durlas
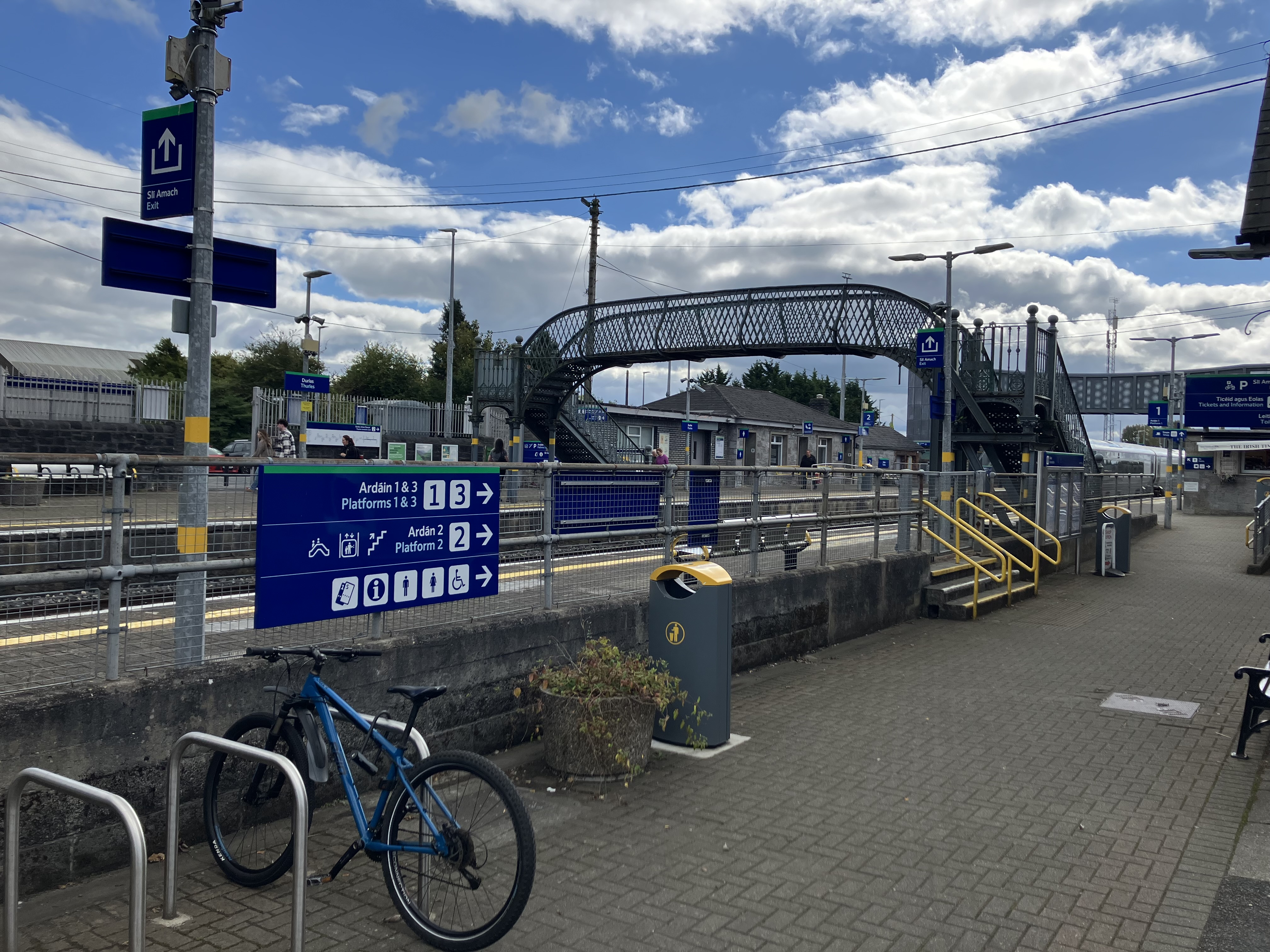
- Station platform, September 2024

General information
- Location: Railway Road, Thurles; County Tipperary, E41 H027; Ireland
- Coordinates: 52°40′35″N 7°49′19″W
- Owner: Iarnród Éireann
- Operator: Iarnród Éireann
- Platforms: 3
- Bus operators: TFI Local Link
- Connections: 391; 850; 858

Construction
- Structure type: At-grade

History
- Original company: Great Southern and Western Railway
- Pre-grouping: Great Southern and Western Railway
- Post-grouping: Great Southern Railways

Key dates
- 1848: Station opens
- 1880: line to Clonmel opened
- 1963: Clonmel passenger trains withdrawn
- 1967: line to Clonmel closed
Location

Thurles railway station serves the town of Thurles in County Tipperary in Ireland. The station is on the Dublin–Cork Main line, and is situated 86.5 miles (139.2 km) from Dublin Heuston. It has two through platforms and one terminating platform.

An average of 17 trains each day between Dublin Heuston and Cork Kent serve Thurles station.

== History ==
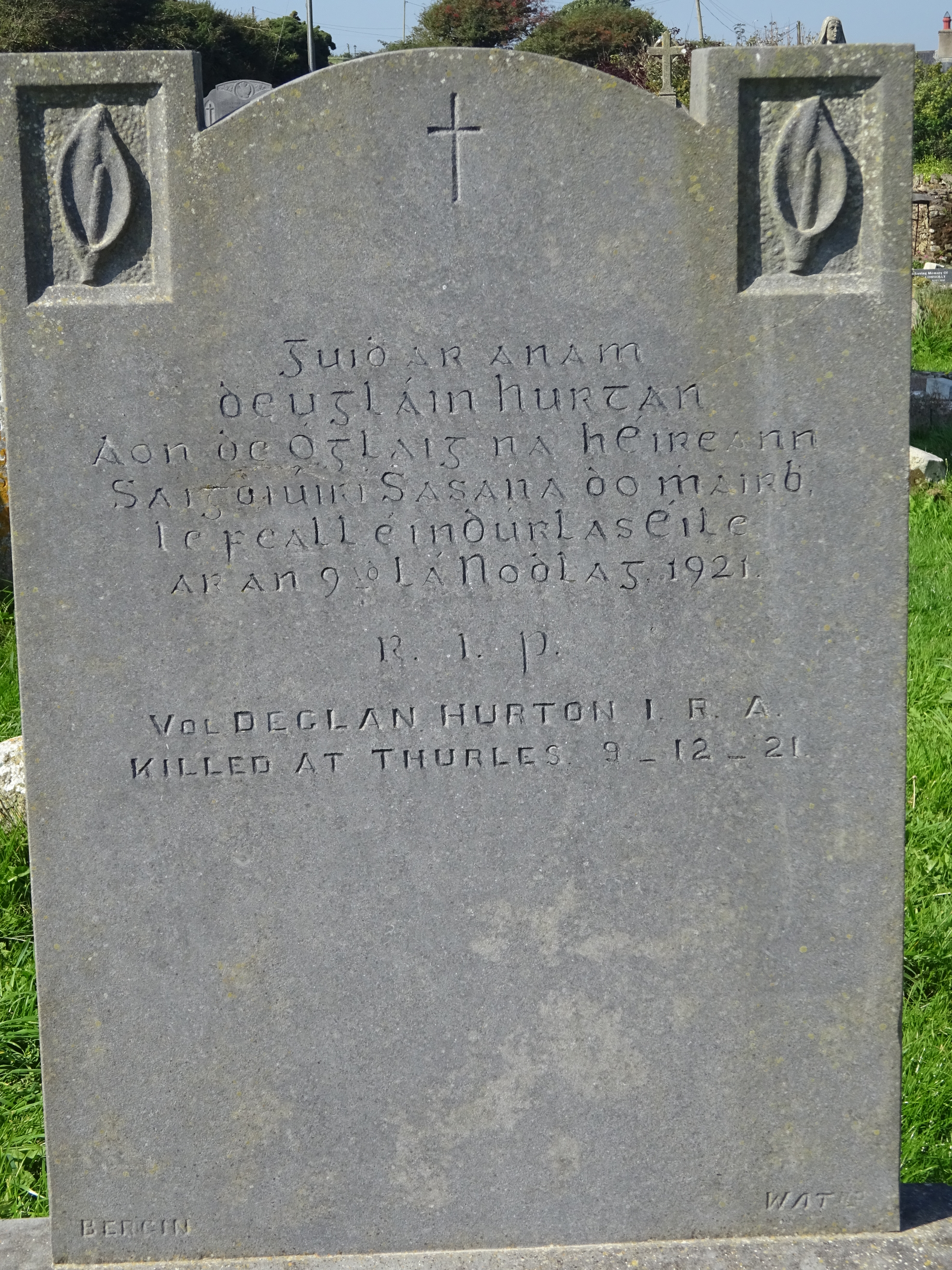
Grave at Ardmore Cathedral of Declan Hurton (IRA), killed at Thurles station in December 1921.

The Great Southern and Western Railway opened the station on 13 March 1848. The station was designed by Sancton Wood.

On 5 August that year William Smith O'Brien was arrested on the station while waiting for a train after an unsuccessful insurrection in Ballingarry in South Tipperary. There is a plaque at the station commemorating the event.

In 1880 the Southern Railway of Ireland opened between Thurles and Clonmel on the Waterford and Limerick Railway (W&LR), making Thurles a junction. Following failure to pay a debt the Board of Works took over the line with operations handed to the W&LR until that was absorbed by the GS&WR in 1901.

On 9 December 1921, Old IRA members were being released during the Irish War of Independence. As internees reached Thurles railway station, a bomb was thrown at the train. Vol. Declan Hurton was injured and later died of his wounds.

CIÉ withdrew passenger services from the Thurles – Clonmel line in 1963 and closed the line to freight in 1967.

Thurles station has three times won the Irish Rail Best Intercity Station prize.

== Services ==
=== Train Services ===
Preceding station	Iarnród Éireann	Following station
Templemore	InterCity; Dublin–Cork railway line	Limerick Junction
Dublin Heuston or Portarlington	InterCity; Dublin–Tralee Main Line	Limerick Junction
Templemore	InterCity; Dublin-Limerick Main Line	Limerick Colbert
	Disused railways	
terminus	Great Southern and Western Railway; Thurles–Clonmel line	Horse and Jockey

== See also ==
- List of railway stations in Ireland

== Bibliography ==
- Murray, K. A.; McNeill, D. B. (1976). The Great Southern & Western Railway. Irish Railway Record Society. ISBN 0904078051. OCLC 3069424.
