= Errill =

Village in County Laois, Ireland

Errill Eiréil
- Village
- Location in Ireland
- Coordinates: 52°52′N 7°41′W
- Country: Ireland
- Province: Leinster
- County: County Laois

Population (2016)
  - Total: 182
- Time zone: UTC+0 (WET)
  - Summer (DST): UTC-1 (IST (WEST))

Errill (Irish: Eiréil, meaning 'bed or tomb') is a village in southwest County Laois, Ireland, near the County Tipperary and County Kilkenny borders. It is 6 km west of Rathdowney and 12 km north-east of Templemore. The village is centred on a village green around which sits a shop with the local post office, two pubs and a Roman Catholic church. The local primary school and village hall are less than 1 kilometre (0.62 mi) from the village near St Kieran's church and Errill cemetery. Páirc Eiréil belonging to Errill GAA club is also located less than 1 kilometre (0.62 mi) from the village.

== Sport ==
Errill GAA was the local Gaelic Athletic Association club, which was established in 1928, before amalgamation with neighbouring Rathdowney GAA club. The local GAA team, now Rathdowney-Errill GAA Club, has won five Laois Senior Hurling Championships since their amalgamation in 2005. Errill Primary School also have a history of Cumann na mBunscoil victories. The Errill boys' team won their division in 2016 while the Errill girls' team reached a division 2 semi-final in the same year. Errill beat neighbours Rathdowney in the 2016 Junior C Championship and followed up this victory in August 2017 by winning promotion again with a win in the Junior B Championship.

== See also ==
- List of towns and villages in Ireland
