= Templemore =

Town in County Tipperary, Ireland

Templemore An Teampall Mór (Irish)
- Town
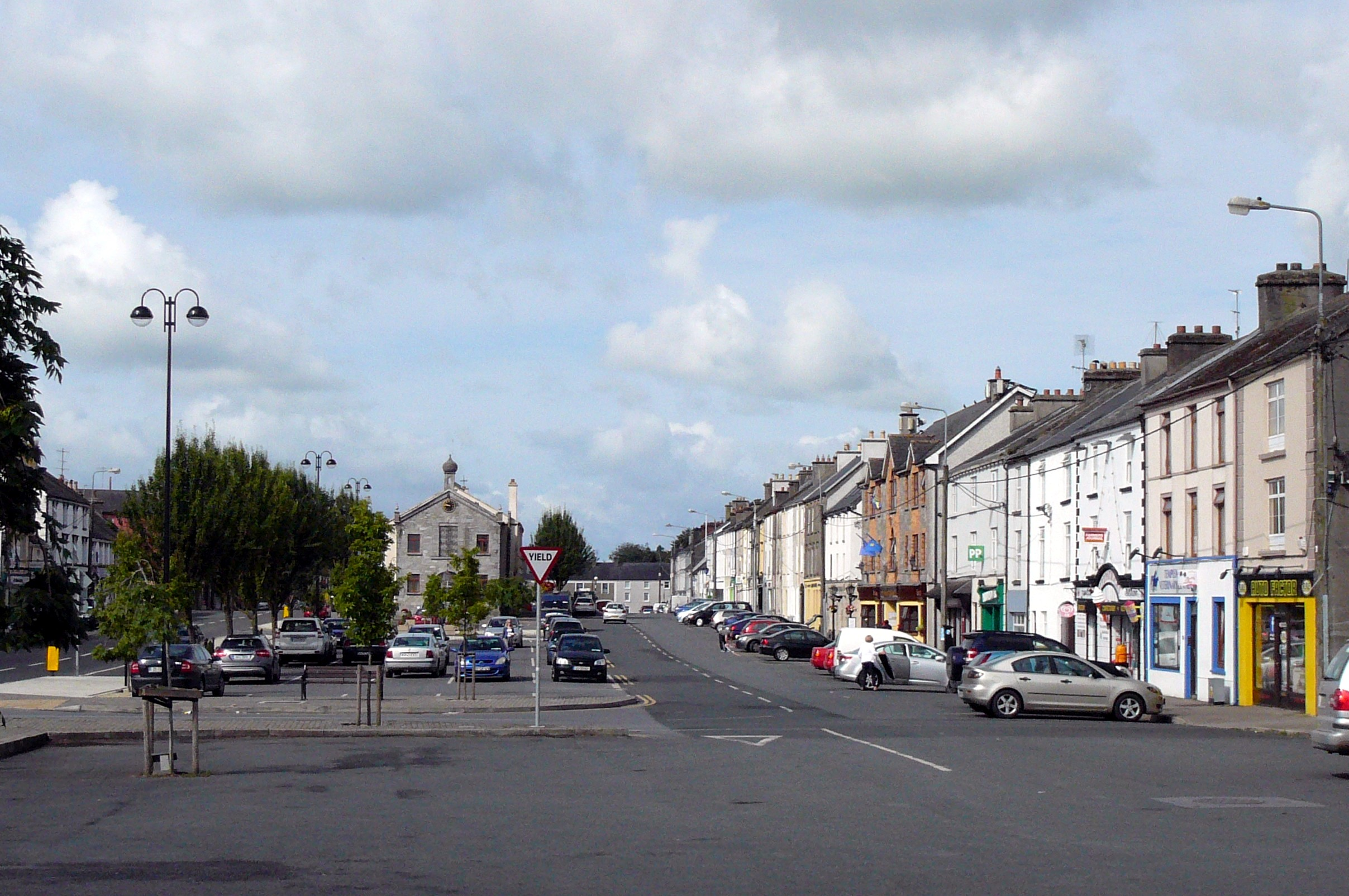
- Main Street with Templemore Town Hall in the centre

- Location in Ireland
- Coordinates: 52°48′N 7°50′W
- Country: Ireland
- Province: Munster
- County: County Tipperary
- Barony: Eliogarty

Population (2022)
  - Total: 2,005
- Time zone: UTC0 (WET)
  - Summer (DST): UTC+1 (IST)
- Eircode: E41
- Area code: 0504
- Irish Grid Reference: S104720
- Website: www.templemore.ie

Templemore (Irish: An Teampall Mór, meaning 'the big church') is a town in County Tipperary, Ireland. It is a civil parish in the historical barony of Eliogarty. It is part of the parish of Templemore, Clonmore and Killea in the Roman Catholic Archdiocese of Cashel and Emly.

The town's population increased from 1,939 at the 2016 census to 2,005 in the 2022 census.

== Location and access ==
Templemore is the eighth largest town in County Tipperary. The N62 national route connects the town to the main Dublin-Limerick motorway (M7 – Junction 22) and Roscrea north of the parish. Travelling south, the route connects to Thurles and then the main Dublin-Cork motorway (M8 – Junction 6 Horse and Jockey). The N62 originates in Athlone.

To the east, the R433 connects the town to the M8 at a more northerly point (Junction 3) via the villages of Clonmore, Errill and the town of Rathdowney in County Laois. Alternatively, the motorway may be accessed via the village of Templetuohy. To the west, the R501, tracking the Devil's Bit mountain range, goes to Borrisoleigh.

Templemore railway station is on the Dublin-Cork railway line operated by Iarnród Éireann. There are direct trains to and from stations like Dublin Heuston railway station (8 trains avg), Thurles (9 trains avg) Cork (4 trains avg) and Limerick (4 trains avg) daily

== History ==
=== Ancient history ===
The ancient territory of Éile obtained its name from pre-historic inhabitants called the Eli, about whom little is known beyond what may be gathered from legends and traditions. The extent of Éile varied throughout the centuries with the rise and fall of the tribes in occupation. During this century however Éile appears to have reached its greatest extent, stretching from Croghan Bri Eli (Croghan Hill in Offaly) to just south of Cashel (in Corca Eathrach Eli). The southern part of this territory embraced the baronies of Eliogarty and Ikerrin, a great part of the modern barony of Middle Third, the territory of Ileagh (or Ileigh) and a portion of the present barony of Kilnamanagh Upper.

By the 8th century, the territory of Ancient Éile had broken up into a number of petty kingdoms: the O'Carroll occupied the northern portion, the O'Spillanes held Ileagh, the Eóganacht Chaisil had annexed Middle Third. The ancient name of the district on which the town now stands was Tuatha Corca Teine. Teine was supposed to have been the son of the King of Connacht, arriving in the district shortly after Saint Patrick. Monastic settlements were located at the site of Teine's fort, 'Land of the Monks' (Irish: Farran na Manna). A holy man named Silean (anglicised as Sheelan) is reputed to have accompanied St Patrick and to have established a monastery in the area. There is no townland called Templemore. The townland on which the town is built is Kiltillane (Irish: Cill tSilean), meaning Saint Sheelan's Church.

=== Feudal period ===
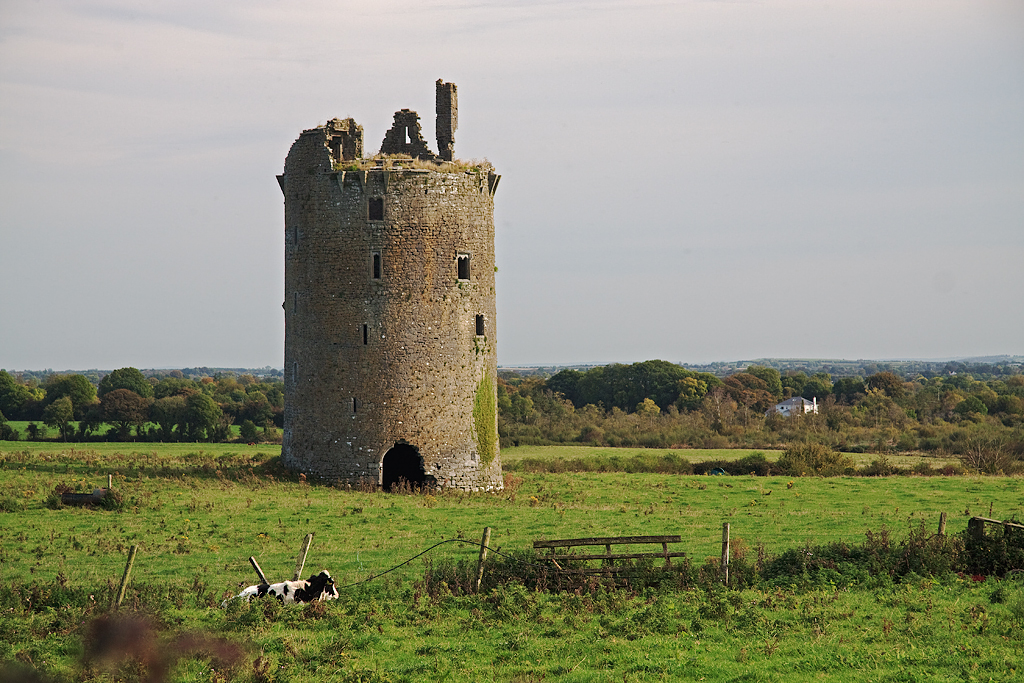
Knockagh Castle, near Drom

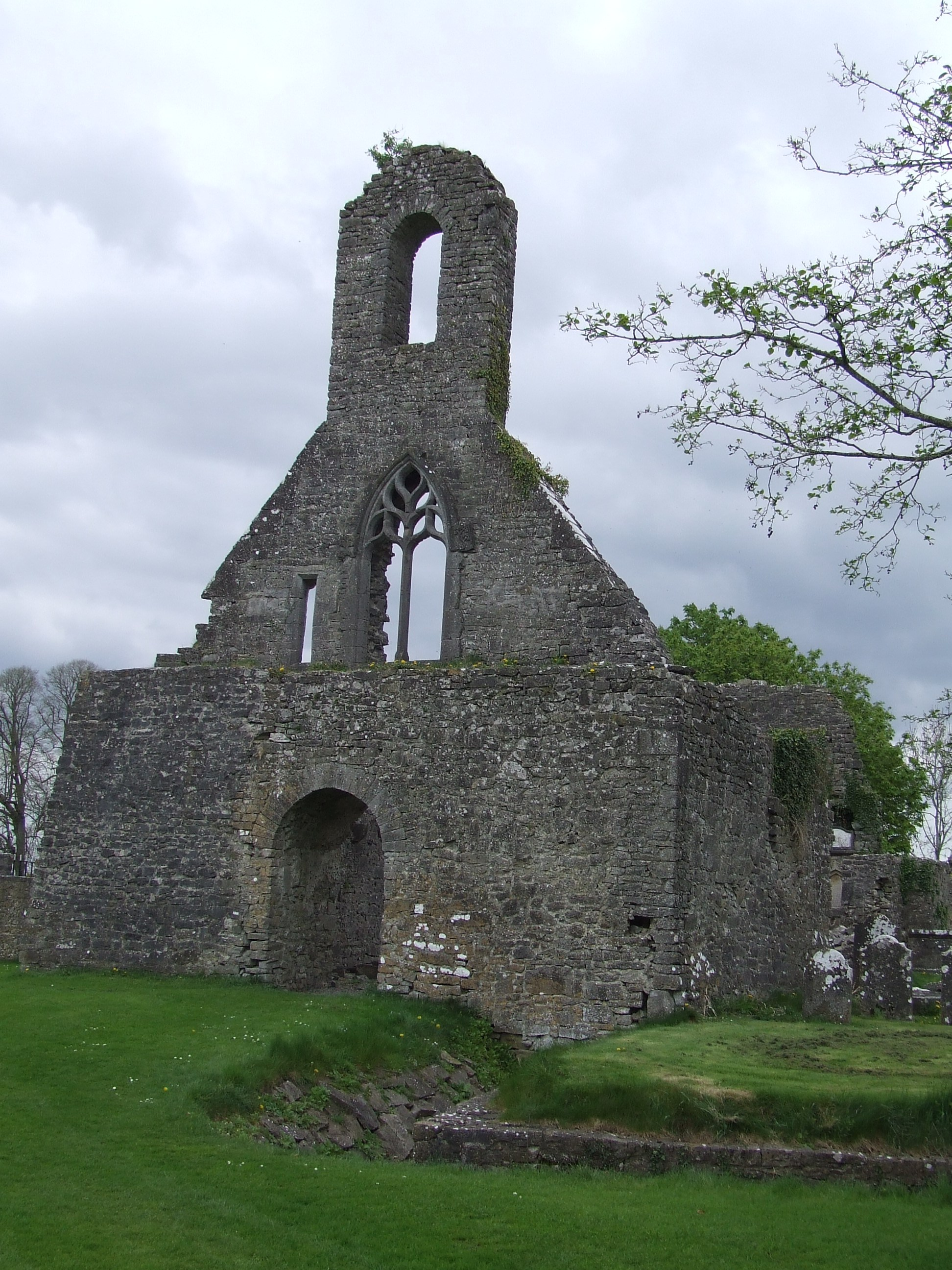
The Big Church or Templemore Abbey West entrance. April 2011.

With the Anglo-Norman invasion of Ireland in 1169, a powerful Norman family – the Butlers – became the new overlords. Early in the 14th century, they were raised to the Earldom of Ormond and held palatine rights in County Tipperary.

The ruins of Templemore Abbey, which may have been established by the Knights Templar, lie to the north of the town in the Town Park, the demesne of the Carden family.

The Blackcastle, as it is locally known, was built in the Town Park in 1450 by James Butler, 4th Earl of Ormond. This building and its manor lands were occupied by the Butlers and were later leased to the families of Purcell of Loughmore (Loughmoe) and Morris of Knockagh.

The O′Fogarty clan held what is now the barony of Eliogarty, while to the north of them, at least some time later, were O'Meaghers of Ikerrin.

=== Carden family ===
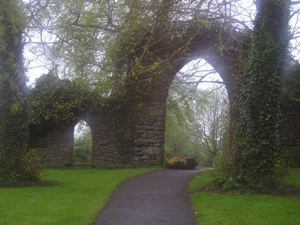
Black Castle Town Park 2007

Around 1695 the Butlers sold extensive lands to an English family called Carden from Cheshire, who settled in the area and also located at Barnane and Fishmoyne. Over the next 200 years, this family was to play a significant part in the development of the town and district which has the nickname of "Carden's Wild Demesne", after the popular 19th-century poem.

Templemore owes its improved state to the liberality and exertions of the John C. Carden, Bart. under whose auspices the public buildings were erected, and by whom the ground on which the town stands was granted at a nominal annual rent.

Following the burning of the Blackcastle, Carden built a new estate. He built a mansion known as the Priory on the edge of the town. The architecture of the Priory was in the style of the Elizabethan era. The Priory was surrounded by a demesne which had a formal garden with paved paths around an artificial lake. Quoting from a contemporary newspaper commentary of 1861, when the Priory was still under construction:

The noble Gothic pile of finely chiselled limestone, with its battlements, turrets, buttresses and extensive façade, and spacious arched doorway; the architraves of grouped columns, retreating to the depth of several feet, convey to the mind an idea of architectural grandeur seldom associated with the country residences of our gentry.

There were extensive gardens and a lot of money was spent on them:

The house itself consists of sixty rooms, and the sum of, we understand £20,000 in round numbers, has been expended so far upon the building, – Upon entering the grand hall, through the massive oaken doorway, replete with medieval decorations, the visitor finds that 'The Priory' has been erected in a style of magnificence not very generally met with – it is floored en mosaique, in walnut and oak; the peculiar grotesque spirit of the Gothic style is not permitted to run riot through the rich oak carving, while that more beautiful element, tracery enters largely into the interior ornamentation – the oak painted ceiling richly stuccoed and the polished armour shields an banners that hang around with the erect figures in full suits of armour; the wide staircase in massive oak – the great doorways leading to the drawing–room at one side and to the library at the other – the rich and mellow light that comes through the beautiful stained glass window that forms the upper portion of the Gothic entrance, and through the lancet shaped sashes – all this bespeak a profuse liberality and taste of order.

The Cardens kept the ruins of the old church and graveyard. At the entrance on the Borrisoleigh Road is the gatekeeper's lodge. After 1860, the Priory was renamed the Abbey.

Lewis' directory of 1837 lists the principal landowners in the locality at the time:

Lloydsborough is the seat of J. Lloyd, Esq.; part of the demesne is in Killea, though the mansion is in the parish of Templemore; it is a handsome residence in a well-planted demesne. The other principal seats are Woodville Lodge, the residence of D. J. Webb, Esq.; Belleville, of the Hon. C.J.K. Monck; and Eastwood, of T. Bennett, Esq.

=== McCan Barracks ===
McCan Barracks, originally called "Richmond barracks", was constructed in 1809 on the 17-acre (69,000 m^{2}) site donated by the town's founder and largest landowner Sir John Carden, ancestor of Sir John Carden, 6th Baronet (1892–1935), who also donated the adjoining 40 acres (160,000 m^{2}) for training and recreation. It replaced an earlier barracks located near the Ursuline convent. George Borrow resided there when he accompanied his father's regiment to Templemore in 1816. The new barracks consisted of 2 squares, surrounded by company lines, stores, married quarters, officer's mess, military prison, church and hospital. Completely surrounded by a high wall, with protective/defensive posts at each corner, it had accommodation for 25 officers, married quarters for 48 other ranks, and 767 unmarried personnel. A total of 36 hospital beds and 15 guardroom cells were located within the complex as well as stabling for 27 officers' horses. The surrounding area was quickly developed, with names such as Talavera Place, Vimeiro Mall and Regent Bridge, reminders of the victories of the British in the Peninsular War taking place at the time of the construction of the barracks.

In late summer 1920, Templemore was the site of alleged Marian apparitions. The town briefly became a popular pilgrimage destination. This took place during the War of Independence and also resulted in a brief truce between the IRA and Crown forces in the area.

Since February 1964, the barracks has been the site of the Garda Síochána College, the centre for training Ireland's police force.

== Templemore today ==
The town council was abolished in 2014 following the enactment of the Local Government Reform Act 2014.

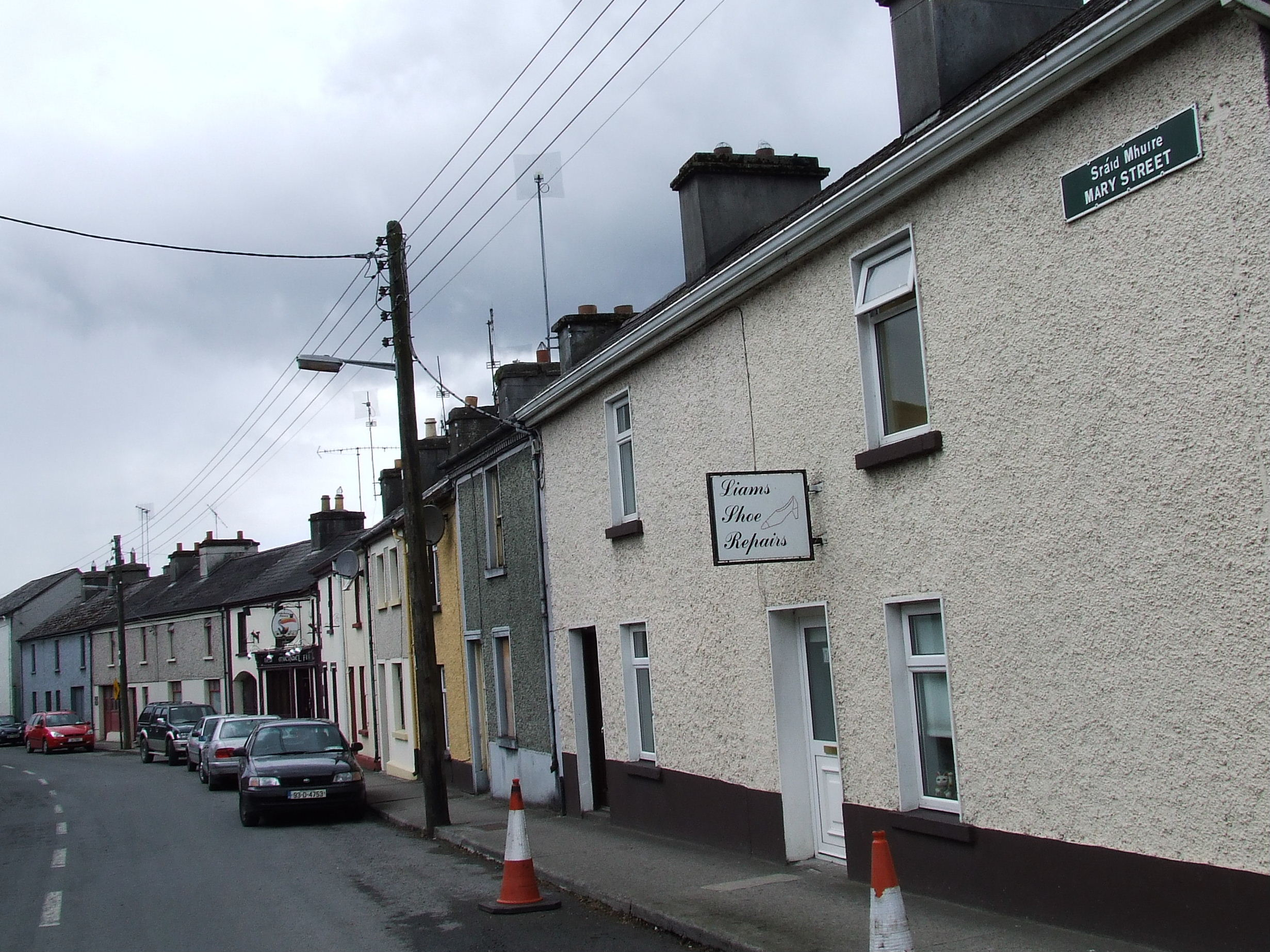
Mary Street

=== Townlands in the civil parish ===
There are 38 townlands in the civil parish of Templemore. The bulk of the town of Templemore lies in the townland of Kiltillane which has the River Suir as its eastern boundary. Townlands in the north-western parts of the parish are situated in the barony of Ikerrin. From north to south they are Killough, Clontaaffe, Craiguedarg, Curraduff and Graiguebeg. The townland of Killawardy is mainly in the civil parish of Killea. Adjacent to it, but in the parish of Templemore and the barony of Eliogarty, is a townland of the same name.

Townland (English)	Townland (Irish)	Acres	Barony	Poor Law Union
Adamstown	Baile Ádaim	289	Eliogarty	Thurles
Ballycahill	Baile Uí Chathail	1,028	Eliogarty	Thurles
Ballyheen	Béal Átha Hín	156	Eliogarty	Thurles
Barnalascaw	Bearna Leathscátha	18	Eliogarty	Thurles
Belleville	Belleville	32	Eliogarty	Thurles
Borrisbeg	An Bhuiríos Bheag	488	Eliogarty	Thurles
Butlerslodge	Lóiste an Bhuitléaraigh	20	Eliogarty	Thurles
Clontaaffe	Cluain Tífe	462	Ikerrin	Roscrea
Craiguedarg	An Ghráig Dhearg	82	Ikerrin	Roscrea
Culleenagh	An Choillíneach	162	Eliogarty	Thurles
Curraduff	An Currach Dubh	175	Ikerrin	Roscrea
Eastwood	An Choill Thoir	225	Eliogarty	Thurles
Farranacahill	Fearann Ó gCathail	79	Eliogarty	Thurles
Farranaderry	Fearann Doire	172	Eliogarty	Thurles
Forest	An Seisceann	199	Eliogarty	Thurles
Graiguebeg	An Ghráig Bheag	37	Ikerrin	Roscrea
Greenwood	An Choill Ghlas	40	Eliogarty	Thurles
Ivyhall	Halla an Eidhneáin	74	Eliogarty	Thurles
Jockeyhall	Halla an Mharcaigh	42	Eliogarty	Thurles
Kilclareen	Cill Chléirín	156	Eliogarty	Thurles
Killawardy	Coill an Bhardaigh	101	Ikerrin	Roscrea
Killough	Cill Eochaidh	849	Ikerrin	Roscrea
Kiltillane	Cill tSiolláin	506	Eliogarty	Thurles
Kiltilliha	Cill Tuilithe	195	Eliogarty	Thurles
Knockanroe	An Cnocán Rua	760	Eliogarty	Thurles
Kylebeg	An Choill Bheag	17	Eliogarty	Thurles
Lisnaviddoge North	Lios na bhFeadóg Thuaidh	89	Eliogarty	Thurles
Lisnaviddoge South	Lios na bhFeadóg Theas	59	Eliogarty	Thurles
Lloydsborough	Gort Ruáin	322	Eliogarty	Thurles
Manna North	Mana Thuaidh	131	Eliogarty	Thurles
Manna South	Mana Theas	225	Eliogarty	Thurles
Oldtown	An Seanbhaile	354	Eliogarty	Thurles
Priory Demesne	Diméin na Prióireachta	288	Eliogarty	Thurles
Rossnamanniff Lower	Ros na mBanbh Íochtarach	55	Eliogarty	Thurles
Rossnamanniff Upper	Ros na mBanbh Uachtarach	44	Eliogarty	Thurles
Sandymount	Cnocán na Gainimhe	50	Eliogarty	Thurles
Templemore Demesne	Diméin an Teampaill Mhóir	386	Eliogarty	Thurles
Woodville	Woodville	83	Eliogarty	Thurles

=== Amenities and features ===
The most notable landmark in the district is the Devil's Bit mountain range. It is an excursion point for people to visit 'the Rock' and cross at the summit. Following the War of Independence, the private demesne of the Carden family came into the ownership of the town's urban district council which handed it over to the citizens as the Town Park. The Park incorporates GAA grounds (Páirc Shíleáin), Lakeside Pitch & Putt Course and an all-weather athletic track in the care of Templemore Athletic Club. The demesne's mature woodlands features walks, the ruin of the Black Castle on the western bank of the lake and the ruin of the eponymous big church. The main focus of attention is the man-made lake (7.5 acres) which is used for coarse fishing.

On the Roscrea road there is a cluster of buildings associated with the Church of Ireland community. Among these is St Mary's Church, which is the principal church serving the community in Templemore, Thurles and Kilfithmone. The church originally stood in front of one of the entrances to the Abbey's parkland. When the estates locally known as The Park were built in the late 1950s, the entrance gates and avenue were removed by the town council. The church, along with St Mary's School, the Rectory, adjacent cottage and lodge, were built in 1790 on land donated by Sir John Craven Carden.

The foundation stone for the parish church, the Church of the Sacred Heart, was laid on 1 January 1877. It stands on the site of the former residential Erasmus Smith school. At the nearby village of Loughmore is the historic Loughmoe Castle.

Templemore Town Hall, in the centre of the town, was commissioned as a market house in 1816.

=== Education ===
Templemore was one of the first three locations selected by the trust of Erasmus Smith in the 17th century for his schools. The Sisters of Mercy operated the St. Augustine's Industrial School for Girls in the town from 1870 to 1965. Today's schools include:

- St. Colmcille's Primary School, under the ethos of the Catholic Church.
- St. Joseph's Primary School, under the ethos of the Catholic Church.
- St. Mary's National School, under the ethos of the Church of Ireland.
- Our Lady's Secondary School (co-educational), under the ethos of the Catholic Church. It was formed when the Sisters of Mercy Convent (a day and boarding school) merged with the Christian Brothers secondary school in 1986.
- Templemore College of Further Education, a QQI college of further education offering over a wide variety mainly vocational courses. It had been named St Sheelan's College, with second-level teaching until 2003. In 2012 it changed its name to Templemore College of Further Education.
- Garda Síochána College, the education and training college of the Garda Síochána (Irish police).

=== Sport ===
==== Gaelic games ====
The local Gaelic Athletic Association club is J.K. Bracken's GAC, formed in 1991 when clubs from Clonmore, Killea and Templemore merged. It is named for Joseph Kevin Bracken, one of the founders of the GAA, who came from Templemore. His son, Brendan, who was a member of Winston Churchill's government in the United Kingdom during World War II, was born in Templemore.

==== Golf ====
There is a nine-hole golf course located at close to the Garda Síochána College just off the Thurles road. The Lakeside Pitch-and-Putt club is located beside the lake in the Town Park. Its eighteen-hole course is affiliated to the Pitch and Putt Union of Ireland.

==== Angling ====
Coarse fishing is available in the lake in the town park. The lake was recently restored after a period of pollution and rising phosphates. It now has a stock of native fish, as well as a fountain.

==== Parkrun ====
A weekly free 5 km (3.1 mi) Parkrun takes place in Templemore.

=== International relations ===
Templemore is twinned with the community of Prémilhat in France and with the municipality of Potenza Picena in Italy.

== People ==
- John R. Bohan, American politician.
- Brendan Bracken, British Minister of Information from 1941 to 1945 under Winston Churchill.
- Éamonn Corcoran, who played for Tipperary GAA.
- Fr. Francis Gleeson, Army Chaplain in World War I.
- Charles Monck, British politician who served as the first Governor General of an independent Canada.
- John Morrissey, American heavyweight champion bare-knuckle boxer, early casino operator, two-term member of the United States House of Representatives, two-term New York State Senator, and a founder of Saratoga Race Course.

== See also ==
- List of towns and villages in the Republic of Ireland
- List of civil parishes of Tipperary
- List of Market Houses in Ireland
- List of twin towns and sister cities in the Republic of Ireland
- Charles Monck, 3rd Viscount Monck
