= Carden baronets =

Set index for Carden baronets

There have been two baronetcies created for persons with the surname Carden, one in the Baronetage of Ireland and one in the Baronetage of the United Kingdom. As of 2026 the former is extant.

- Carden baronets of Templemore (1787)
- Carden baronets of Wimpole Street and Molesey (1887)
