= Garda Museum =

- Músaem an Gharda Síochána
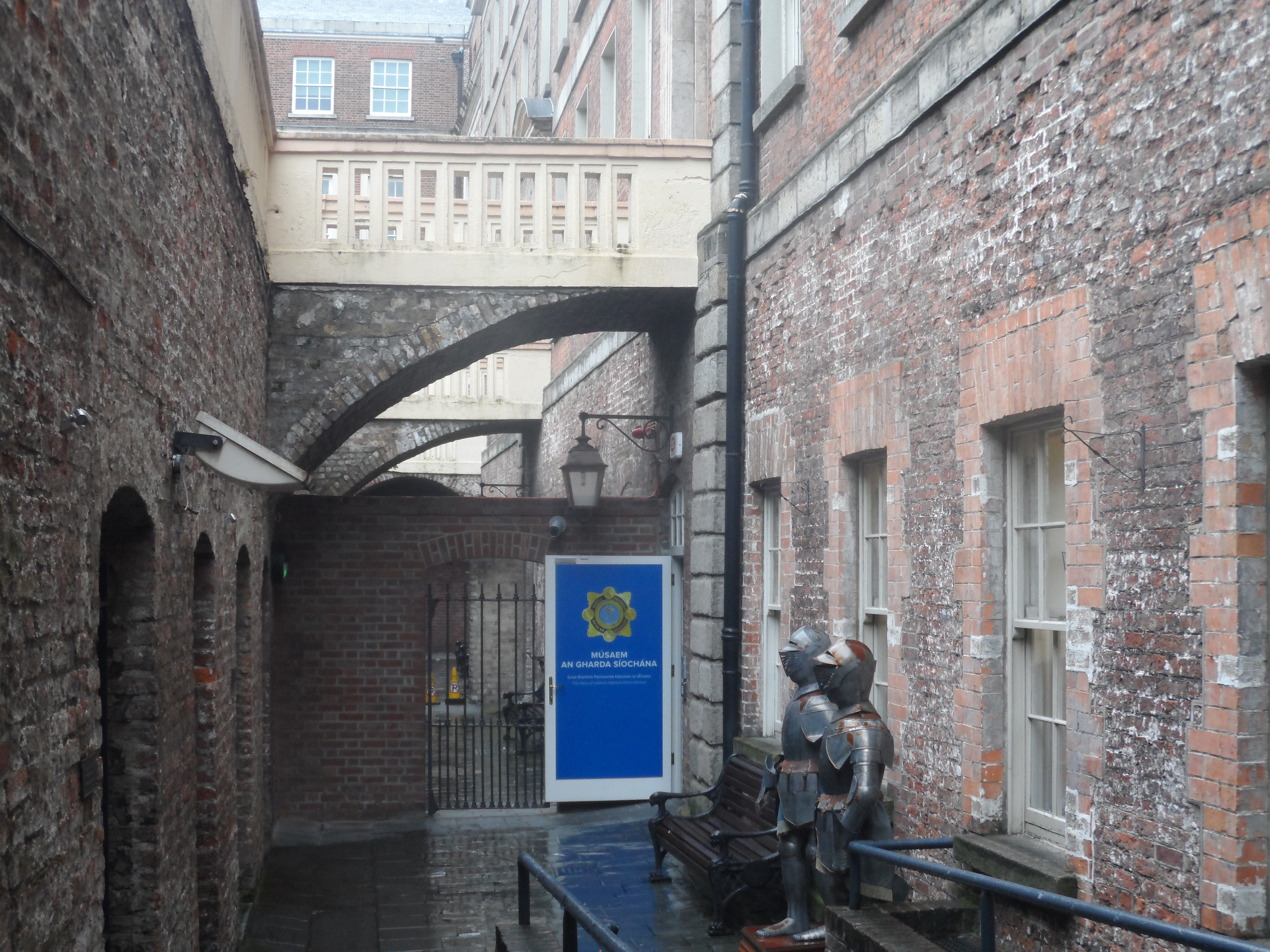
- Entrance

- Location within Central Dublin
- Established: August 2017
- Location: Treasury Building, Dublin Castle, Dublin, Ireland
- Coordinates: 53.342964°N 6.266992°W
- Type: Police museum
- Website: Garda Museum

The Garda Museum (Irish: Músaem an Gharda Síochána) is a police museum located in Dublin, Ireland, located in the Treasury Building of Dublin Castle.

Opened in 2017 and designed by Dara Lynne Lenehan, it covers the history of law enforcement in the Republic of Ireland (excluding Northern Ireland), including medieval watchmen, the Baronial Constabulary, County Constabulary, the Dublin Metropolitan Police, the Royal Irish Constabulary and the Civic Guard/Garda Síochána.

Garda Commissioner Nóirín O'Sullivan officially opened it in December 2016, but legal disputes meant that the public could not visit until August 2017. It replaced an older museum which had been housed in the Record Tower.

== See also ==
- The Garda College Museum and Visitor Centre which operated from 2002 to 2020 in the Garda Síochána College in Templemore.
