= Dublin Castle =

Irish government complex and historical castle in Dublin

- Caisleán Bhaile Átha Cliath
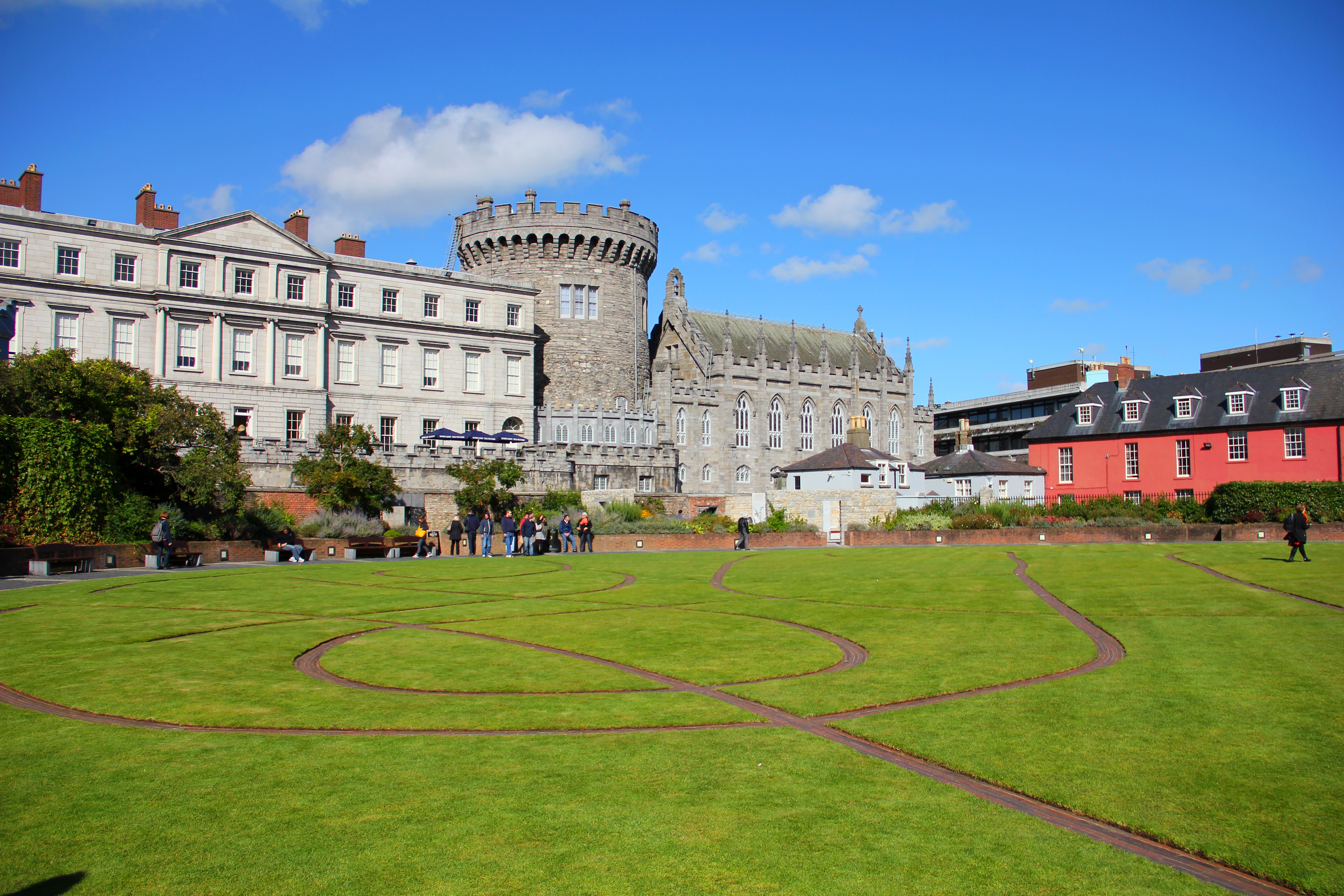
- The Dubhlinn Gardens, which were completed in 1680, are located adjacent to Dublin Castle.

- Location within Central Dublin

General information
- Location: Dame Street, Dublin, Ireland
- Coordinates: 53.3429°N 6.2675°W
- Elevation: 9 metres (30 ft)
- Opened: 1204; 822 years ago
- Owner: Ireland

Technical details
- Grounds: 44,000 square metres (11 acres)

Website
- www.dublincastle.ie

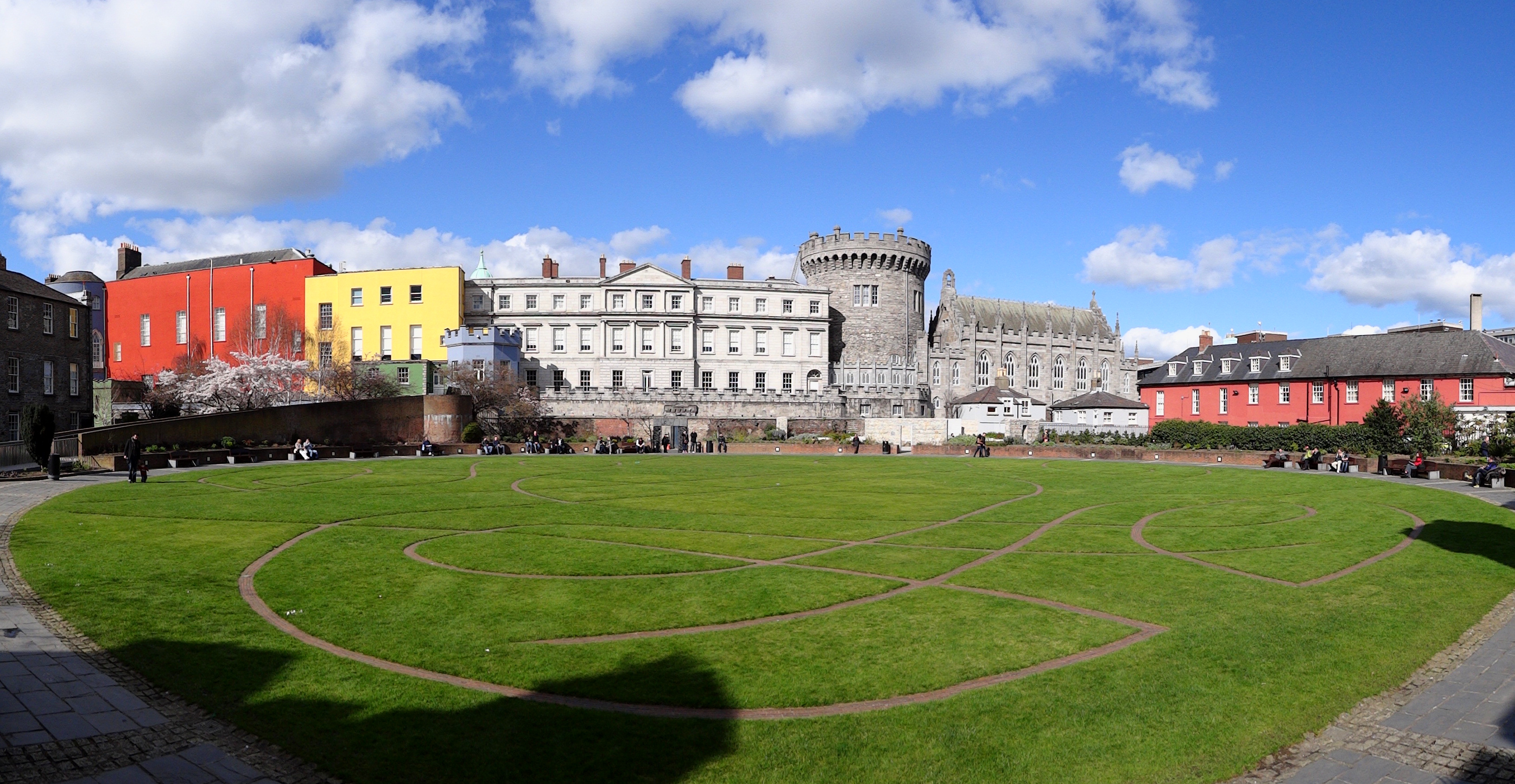
Dublin Castle, seen from the park to the south, outside the walls

Dublin Castle (Irish: Caisleán Bhaile Átha Cliath) is a major Irish government complex, conference centre, and tourist attraction. It is located off Dame Street in central Dublin.

Originally a motte-and-bailey castle chosen for its position at the highest point of central Dublin, it was mostly rebuilt, from the late 17th century onward, as a Georgian palace. Many of the current buildings date from the 18th century, though a castle has stood on the site since the days of King John, the first Lord of Ireland. The Castle served as the seat of English, then later British, government of Ireland under the Lordship of Ireland (1171–1541), the Kingdom of Ireland (1541–1800), and the United Kingdom of Great Britain and Ireland (1801–1922).

Until 1922 it was the seat of the British government's administration in Ireland. After the signing of the Anglo-Irish Treaty in December 1921, the complex was ceremonially handed over to the newly formed Provisional Government led by Michael Collins. It now hosts the inauguration of each President of Ireland and various State receptions.

The castle was built by the dark pool (Dubh Linn in Irish) which gave Dublin its name. This pool lies on the lower course of the River Poddle before its confluence with the River Liffey; when the castle was built, the Liffey was much wider, and the castle was effectively defended by both rivers. The Poddle today runs under the complex.

== Roles ==
Dublin Castle has fulfilled a number of roles throughout its history. Originally built as a defensive fortification for the Norman city of Dublin, it later evolved into an official residence, used by the Lord Lieutenant of Ireland or Viceroy of Ireland, the representative of the monarch. The second-in-command in the Dublin Castle administration, the Chief Secretary for Ireland, had his offices there. Over the years parliament and certain law courts met at the castle before moving to new purpose-built venues. It served as the base for a military garrison and later for intelligence services.

Upon the formation of the Irish Free State in December 1922, the castle temporarily assumed the role of the Four Courts, the legal complex badly damaged during the Civil War. This arrangement lasted for a decade.

In 1938, the inauguration of the first President of Ireland, Douglas Hyde took place in the castle, and the complex has been host to this ceremony ever since. The castle is used for hosting official state visits and more informal foreign affairs engagements, state banquets, including that for the historic visit of Queen Elizabeth II in 2011, and Government policy launches. It acts as the central base for Ireland's hosting of the European Presidency, approximately every 10 years. Two dedicated conference facilities, The Hibernia Conference Centre and The Printworks were installed for the European Presidencies of 1990 and 2013, and are made available for rental by the private sector.

The castle's State Apartments and their associated collection of historic materials form an accredited museum. The castle complex is home to a Garda Síochána unit and the Garda Museum, some parts of the Office of Public Works, some functions of the Irish Revenue Commissioners – and the Revenue Museum – and the Chester Beatty Library.

== History ==
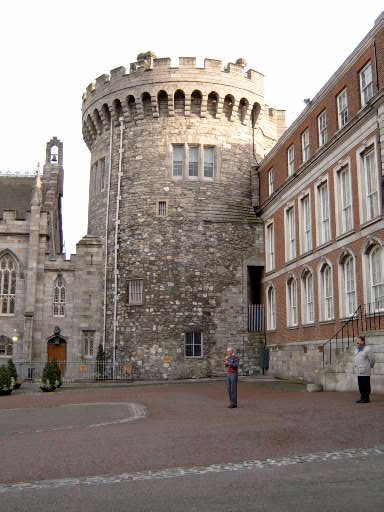
The Record Tower, the sole surviving tower of the medieval castle dating from c. 1228. To its left is the Chapel Royal.

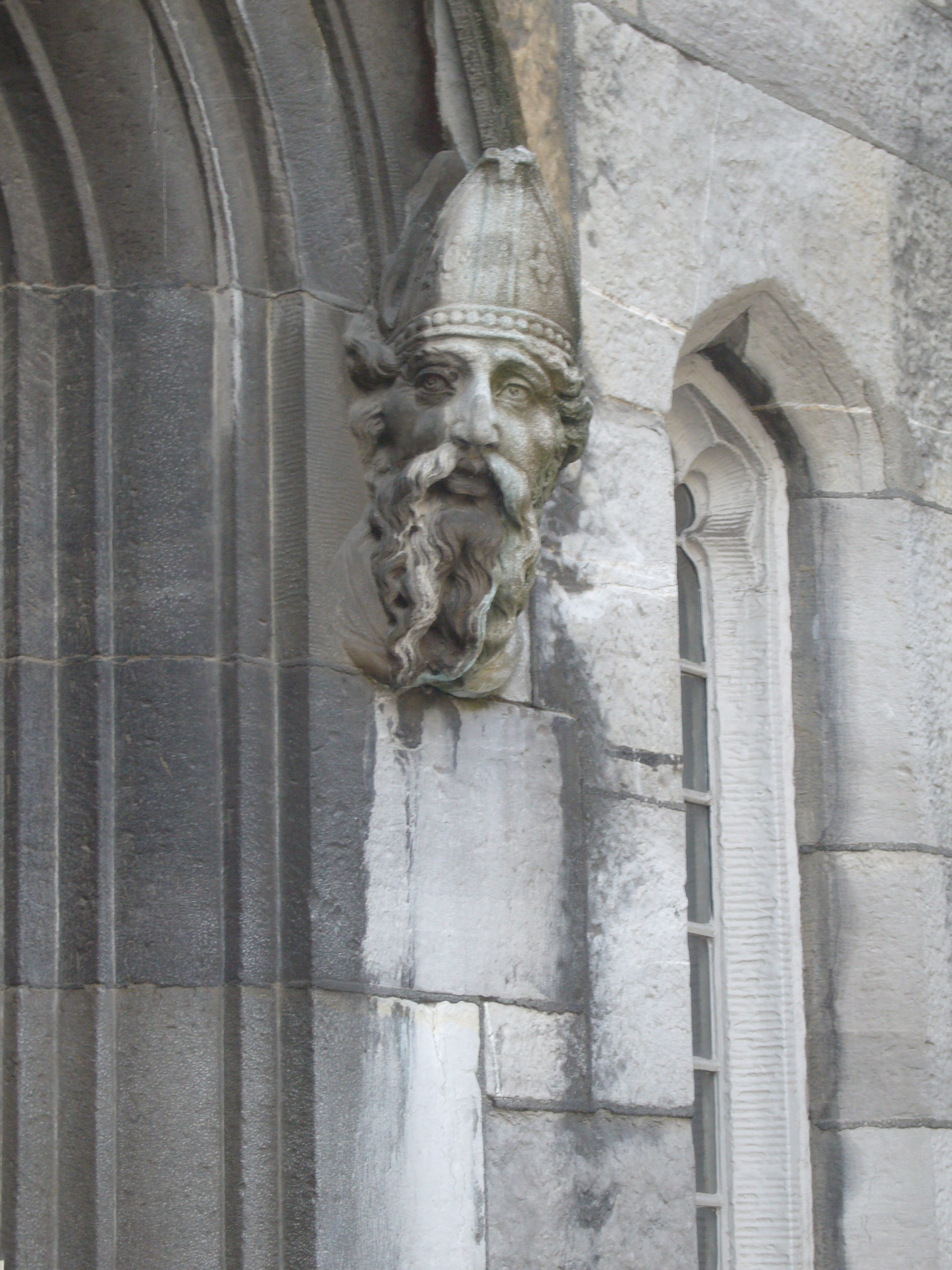
A carved head of Saint Patrick on the Chapel Royal

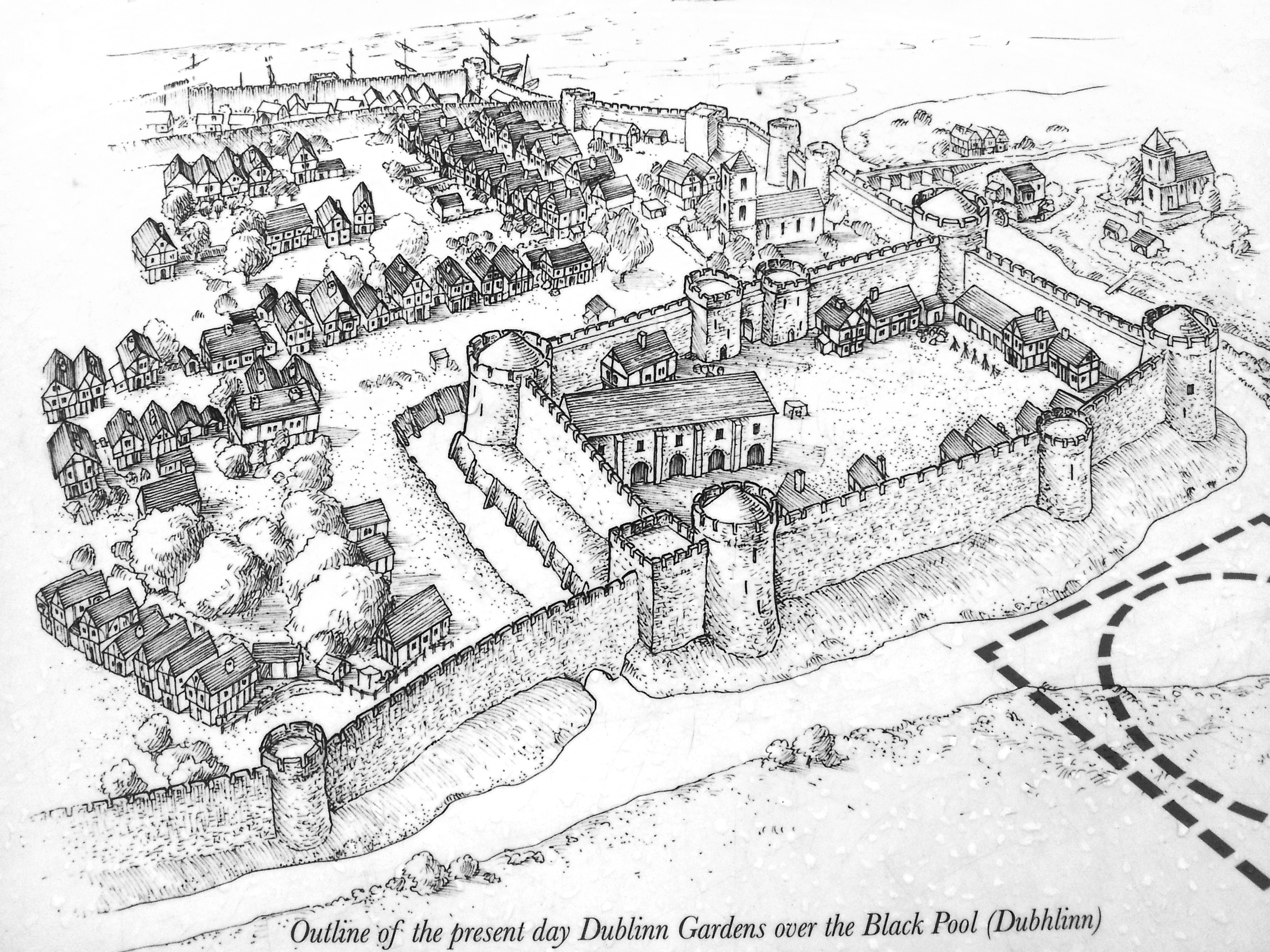
Dublin Castle and Black Pool

Dublin Castle was first founded as a major defensive work by Meiler Fitzhenry on the orders of King John of England in 1204, sometime after the Norman invasion of Ireland in 1169, when it was commanded that a castle be built with strong walls and good ditches for the defence of the city, the administration of justice, and the protection of the King's treasure. It was the first administrative centre for the English Crown in Ireland since the unsuccessful first expedition of John to Ireland in 1185 when he built and issued royal charters from Ardfinnan Castle.

Largely complete by 1230, the castle was of typical Norman courtyard design, with a central square without a keep, bounded on all sides by tall defensive walls and protected at each corner by a circular tower. Sited to the southeast of Norman Dublin, the castle formed one corner of the outer perimeter of the city, using the River Poddle as a natural means of defence along two of its sides. The city wall directly abutted the castle's northeast Powder Tower, extending north and westwards around the city before rejoining the castle at its southwestern Bermingham Tower.

In January 1592, Red Hugh O'Donnell and brothers Art and Henry O'Neill escaped from the castle after a period of imprisonment. Once free of the castle, Henry O'Neill went his own direction and returned safely to Ulster, whereas O'Donnell and Art, alongside a guide sent to help them, continued south to the rural valley of Glenmalure, a rebel stronghold where they knew they would find safety. The escape and subsequent journey to Glenmalure at night in winter, during which Art died of exposure, has been commemorated officially every January since 2009 by the annual Art O'Neill Challenge endurance race/walk.

In 1620 the English-born judge Luke Gernon was greatly impressed by the wall: "a huge and mighty wall, foursquare, and of incredible thickness". In the 17th century, the Earl of Arran described the Castle as "the worst castle in the worst situation in Christendom".

The Poddle was diverted into the city through archways where the walls adjoined the castle, artificially flooding the moat of the fortress's city elevations. One of these archways and part of the wall survive buried underneath the 18th-century buildings, and are open for public viewing.

Through the Middle Ages the wooden buildings within the castle square evolved and changed, the most significant addition being the Great Hall built of stone and timber, variously used as Parliament house, court of law and banqueting hall. The building survived until 1673, when it was damaged by fire and demolished shortly afterwards. The Court of Castle Chamber, the Irish counterpart to the English Star Chamber, sat in Dublin Castle in a room, which was specially built for it about 1570.

in 1684, the Castle sustained severe fire damage. Extensive rebuilding transformed it from a medieval fortress to a Georgian palace. Other than the great Record Tower (c. 1228–1230), which is the sole surviving tower of the original fortification, no trace of medieval buildings remains above ground level today. The battlements of the Record Tower were an early 19th-century addition.

In 1764, English traveller John Bush wrote: "The Castle, as it is called from its having been the situation of one, I suppose, of which at present there are very few remains, is the residence of the lord lieutenant when in Ireland, but has very little of grandeur in its external appearance besides the large square court-yard, which it encloses. But the rooms, some of them, are large and elegant".

United Irishmen General Joseph Holt, a participant in the 1798 Rising, was incarcerated in the Bermingham Tower before being transported to New South Wales in 1799.

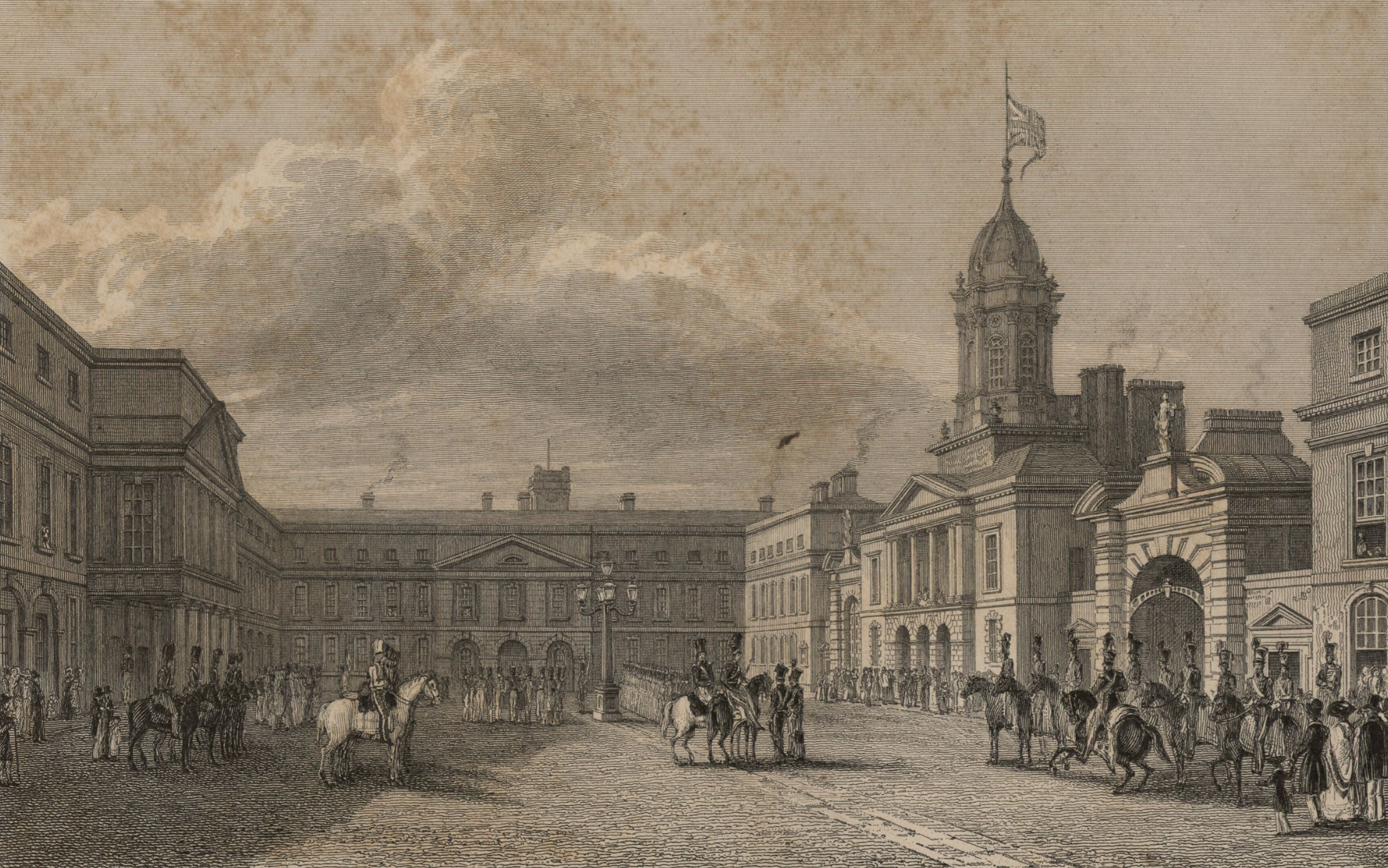
Soldiers at Dublin Castle in 1830

In 1884, officers at the Castle were at the centre of a homosexual scandal incited by the Irish Nationalist politician William O'Brien through his newspaper United Ireland.

In 1890, the castle grounds were summarised in a tourist guidebook with the following entry: "(The castle) is now a gloomy building, of two yards, with little suggestion of a Castle about it.

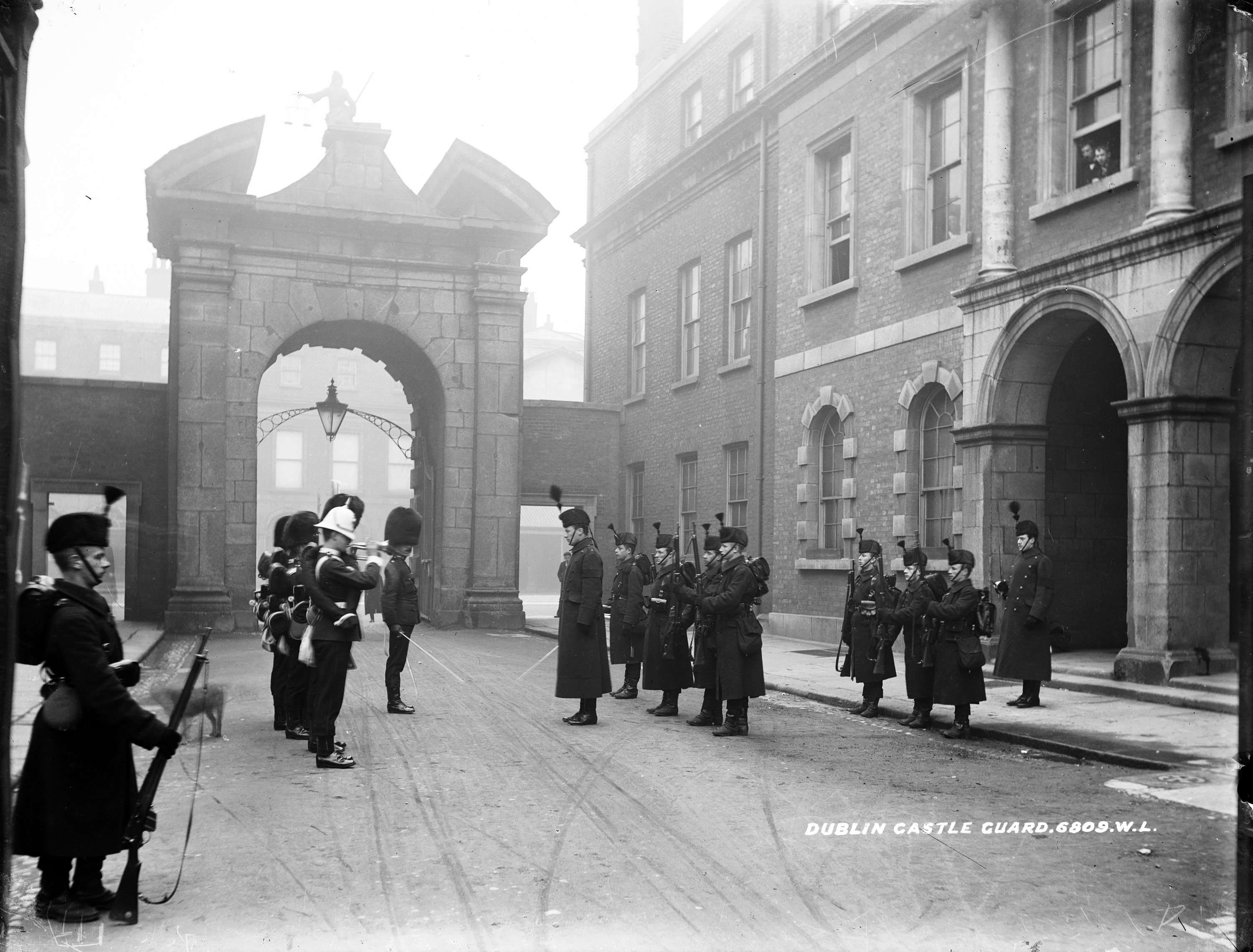
Soldiers at Dublin Castle, c. 1905

In 1907, the Irish Crown Jewels were stolen from the Castle. Suspicion fell upon the Officer of Arms, Sir Arthur Vicars, but rumours of his homosexuality and links to socially important gay men in London, may have compromised the investigation. The jewels have never been recovered.

At the very beginning of the Easter Rising of 1916, a force of twenty-five Irish Citizen Army members were able to seize the entrance and guard room of the Castle before reinforcements for the small garrison arrived. During the Anglo-Irish War the Castle was the nerve centre of the British effort against Irish separatism. On the night of Bloody Sunday in 1920, three Irish Republican Army members Dick McKee, Conor Clune and Peadar Clancy, were tortured and killed there.

When the Irish Free State came into being in 1922, Dublin Castle ceased to function as the administrative seat. It served for some years as temporary Courts of Justice (the Four Courts, the home of the Irish courts' system, had been destroyed in 1922). After the courts vacated the premises, the Castle was used for state ceremonies. As President of the Executive Council, Éamon de Valera received credentials there from newly arrived ambassadors to Ireland on behalf of King George V in the 1930s. In 1938, Douglas Hyde was inaugurated as President of Ireland at the Castle. All inaugurations of subsequent presidents have taken place there since. President Erskine Hamilton Childers' lying-in-state took place there in November 1974, as did that of former President Éamon de Valera in September 1975.

== Layout ==
Plan of Dublin Castle and grounds with pedestrian entrance highlighted

John Cornforth described the Castle as "not even a work of architecture" but "a piece of English make-do and mend".

The complex houses, among other things, some offices of the Revenue Commissioners, including a Stamping Office in a 20th-century building at the end of the Castle Yard.

Dublin Castle is maintained and managed by the Office of Public Works (OPW), and the modern office block was designed by Frank du Berry, a senior OPW architect, in the late 1960s. The design was denounced by many groups, citing the unsympathetic nature of the four-storey block and the placement, which disrupted the rectangular layout of the Castle. Among the groups that objected were the Irish Georgian Society, An Taisce, and the Royal Institute of the Architects of Ireland. Construction began anyway in 1970.

Some elements of the OPW are based in an old stables area, and some functions of the Garda Síochána are also based at the Castle.

The complex also houses the former Ship Street Barracks which formerly housed troops who were involved in the protection of Dublin Castle.

The complex of buildings is usually open to the public, except during certain state functions. The crypt of the Chapel Royal is now used as an arts centre, and occasional concerts are held in the grounds of the Castle. The castle complex also hosts the Chester Beatty Library, in a purpose-constructed facility, with a café, the Garda Museum, in the Treasury Building, and the Revenue Museum. The former site of the "dark pool" on the Poddle was remodelled into a garden, with a water feature that commemorates fallen Gardaí, and a helipad. Opposite the garden is a sculpture and plaque commemorating the volunteers of the 2003 Special Olympics World Summer Games.

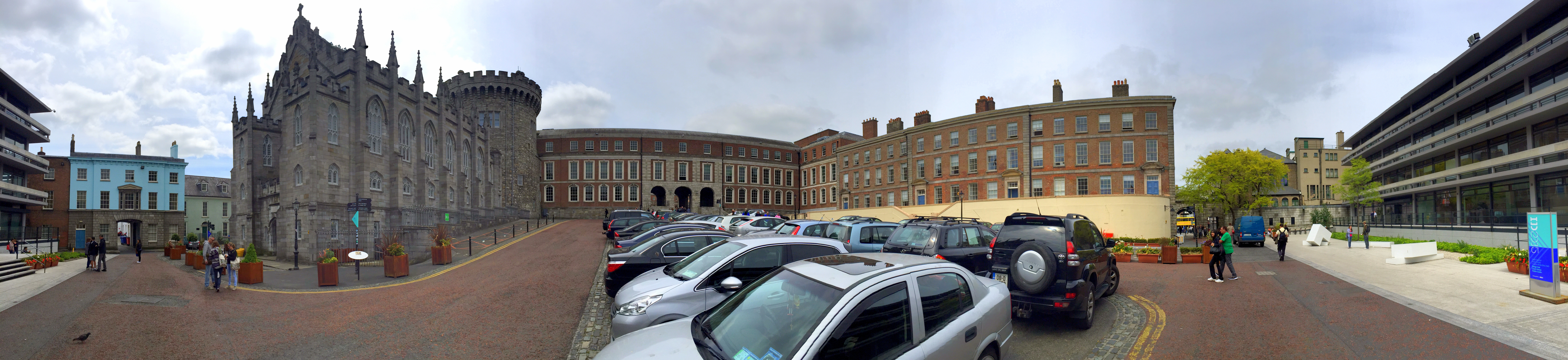
Panorama view of Dublin Castle showing from left to right, gateway to the Dubhlinn Gardens, Chapel Royal, Record Tower, gateway to the upper yard, Treasury Building, visitor reception centre, and Palace Street Gate
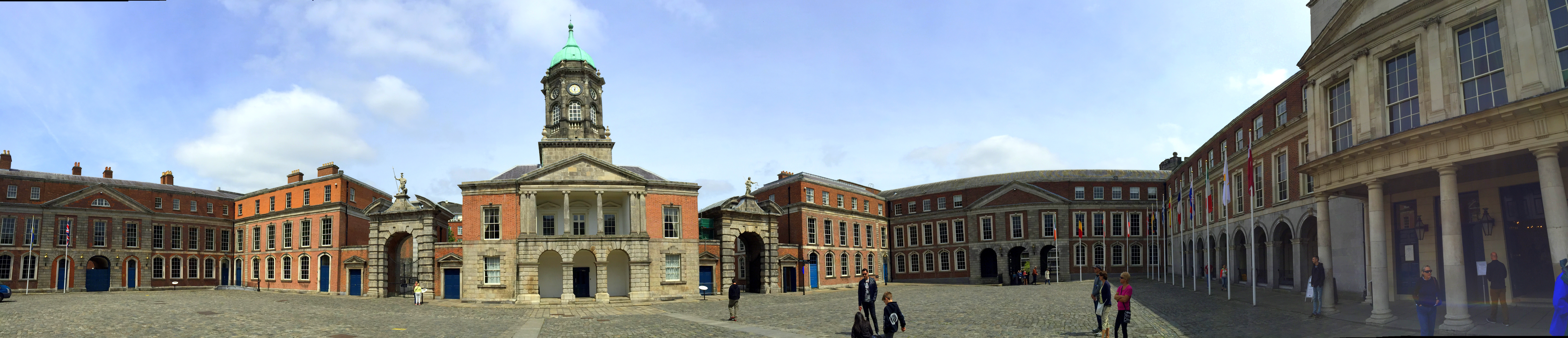
Panorama view. The upper yard of the Dublin Castle, Dublin, Ireland. The view shows, from left to right: Conference Centre, Bedford Hall flanked by the Gates of Fortitude and Justice, Revenue Commissioners, entranceway from the Chapel Royal/Record Tower yard, and finally States Apartments and Dubhlinn Tearooms.
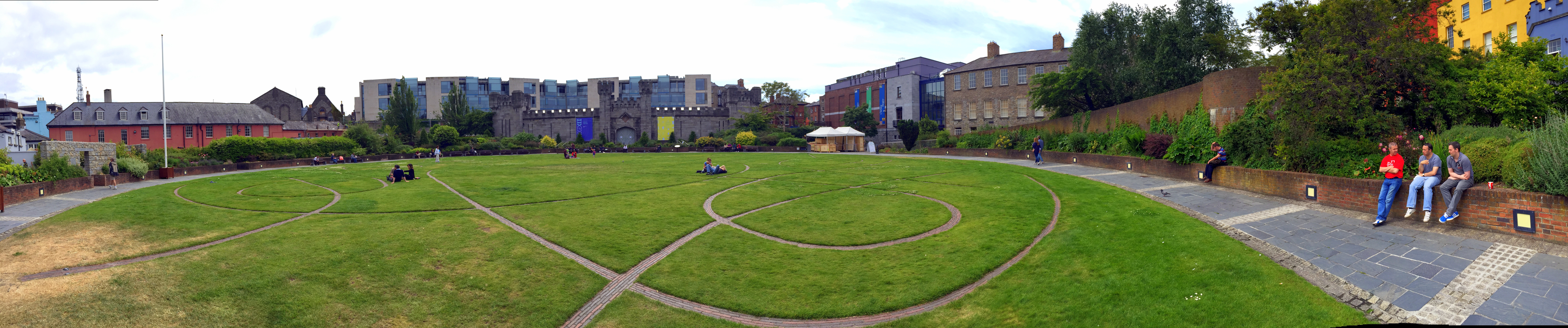
Panorama view of the Dubhlinn Gardens, showing the Coach House (centre) and the Chester Beatty Library (right)

== State Apartments ==
The State Apartments, located in the southern range of buildings of the Upper Yard, contain the rooms formerly used by the Lord Lieutenant for personal accommodation and public entertaining during the annual 'Castle Season', the winter cycle of viceregal social events. Today these richly decorated rooms are used by the Irish government for official engagements including policy launches, hosting of State Visit ceremonial, and the inauguration of the president every seven years. The apartments and their collections form an accredited museum.

The principal rooms of the state apartment complex include the following.

Saint Patrick's Hall
This is the grandest room of the state apartments, and contains one of the most important decorative interiors in Ireland. Formerly the ballroom of the Lord Lieutenant's administration, today the room is used for presidential inaugurations. If a president of Ireland dies in office, such as Erskine H. Childers in 1974, it is here that he or she lies in state. It is one of the oldest rooms in the castle, dating from the 1740s.
Its decoration largely dates from c. 1790, including the most significant painted ceiling in Ireland, executed by Vincenzo Valdre (c. 1742–1814). Composed of three panels, the ceiling depicts the coronation of King George III, Saint Patrick introducing Christianity to Ireland, and King Henry II receiving the submission of the Irish chieftains. The state dinner hosted by the President of Ireland to welcome Queen Elizabeth II to Ireland was held here on the evening of 18 May 2011.
Following the disestablishment of the Church of Ireland in 1871, the Order of St. Patrick, Ireland's order of chivalry, moved its ceremonial home from St. Patrick's Cathedral to St. Patrick's Hall. The banners and hatchment plates of the knights who were living at the time when most of Ireland gained independence as the Irish Free State, in December 1922, remain in place.

Throne Room
Originally built as the Battleaxe Hall in the 1740s, it was converted to a presence chamber around 1790. The regal decoration dates from that time and from alterations in the 1830s. It contains a throne built for the visit of King George IV to Ireland in 1821.

State Drawing Room
Remodelled in the 1830s as the principal reception room of the Lord Lieutenant and his household, today this room is reserved in use for the reception of foreign dignitaries. Largely destroyed by fire in 1941, the room was reconstructed with minor modifications in 1964–1968 by the Office of Public Works (OPW), making use of salvaged and replicated furnishings and fittings.

State Dining Room
Also called the Picture Gallery, and formerly known as the Supper Room, this is the oldest room in the castle and largely retains its original decoration, having escaped major modification and fire over the years. It dates from Lord Chesterfield's building of the State Apartments in the 1740s, and was intended for use as a supper room adjoining St. Patrick's Hall and as a personal dining room. Today the room is used for dining when conferences take place in St. Patrick's Hall.

State bedrooms
These former private quarters of the Lord Lieutenant were built as five interconnecting rooms running along the back of the building, adjoining the spine corridor that separates them from the state drawing room. Completely rebuilt in the 1960s following a fire in 1941, the rooms maintain the original courtly sequence and are used as ancillary drawing and meeting rooms to the principal apartments. The last dignitary to stay in the royal bedrooms was Prime Minister Margaret Thatcher, who spent a night there with her husband Denis during one of the European Council meetings held in the 1980s.

State Corridor
The most architectural space of the State Apartments, this expressive, deeply modelled corridor, was originally built c. 1758 to the designs of the Surveyor General, Thomas Eyre. Based on the early 18th-century corridor of Sir Edward Lovett Pearce in the former Parliament House on College Green, it features a marching procession of vaults and arches which were originally top-lit. Regrettably, an office storey was built over the skylights following complete reconstruction of the corridor in the 1960s as the result of a differential settlement with the reconstruction of the adjoining drawing room. The corridor features exact plaster casts of the original arch detailing, and the original doorcases and fireplaces were salvaged prior to rebuilding.

=== Gallery ===
Images of the State Apartments

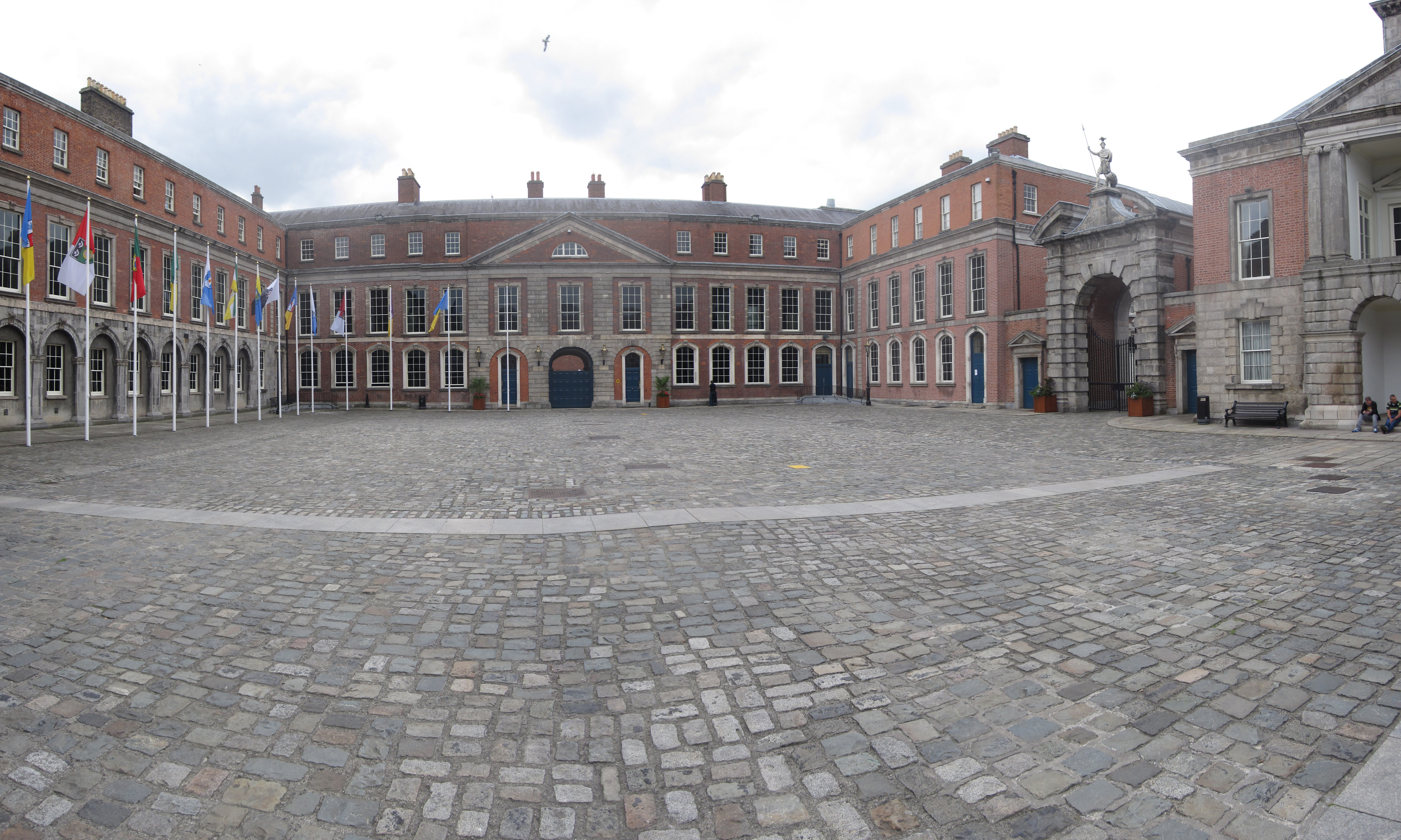
The upper yard

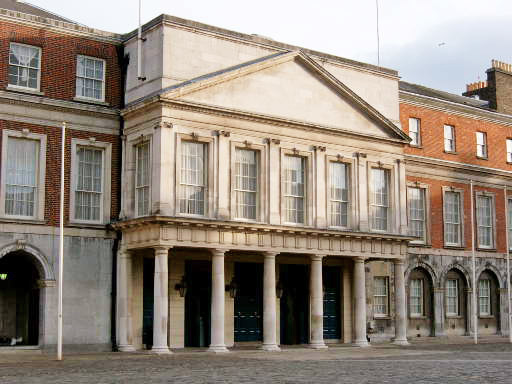
Entry to the State Apartments

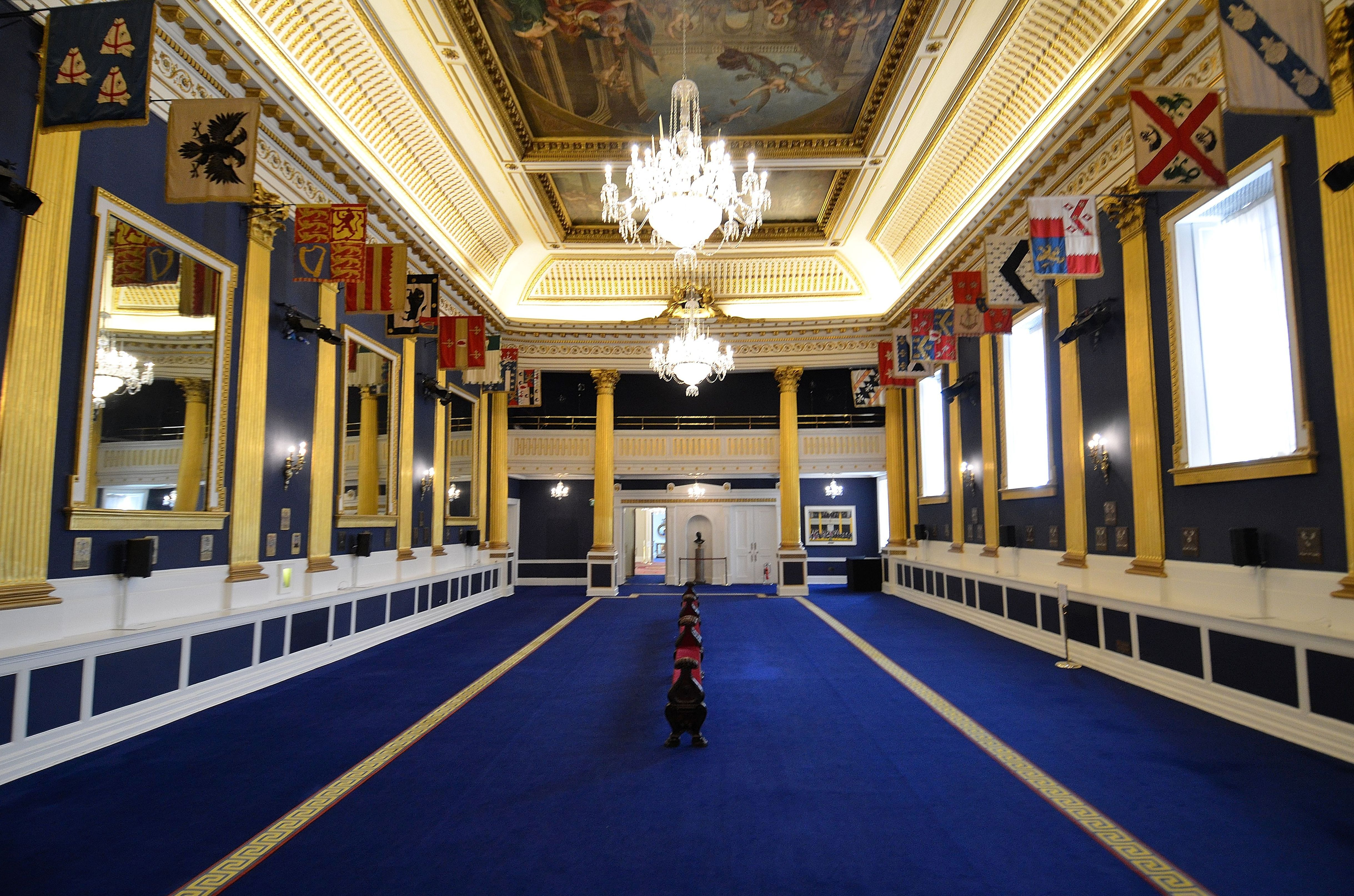
St Patrick's Hall

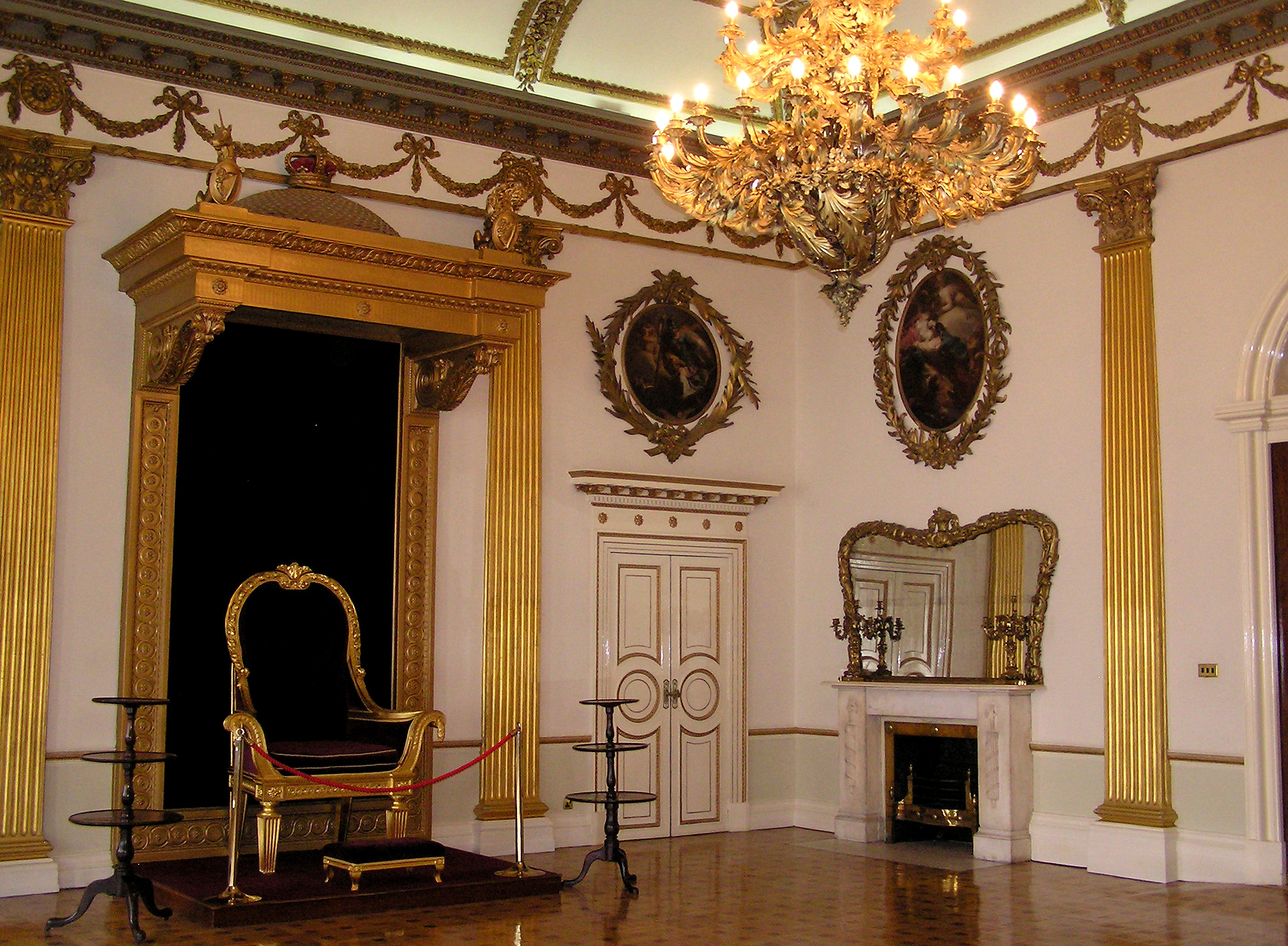
Throne Room

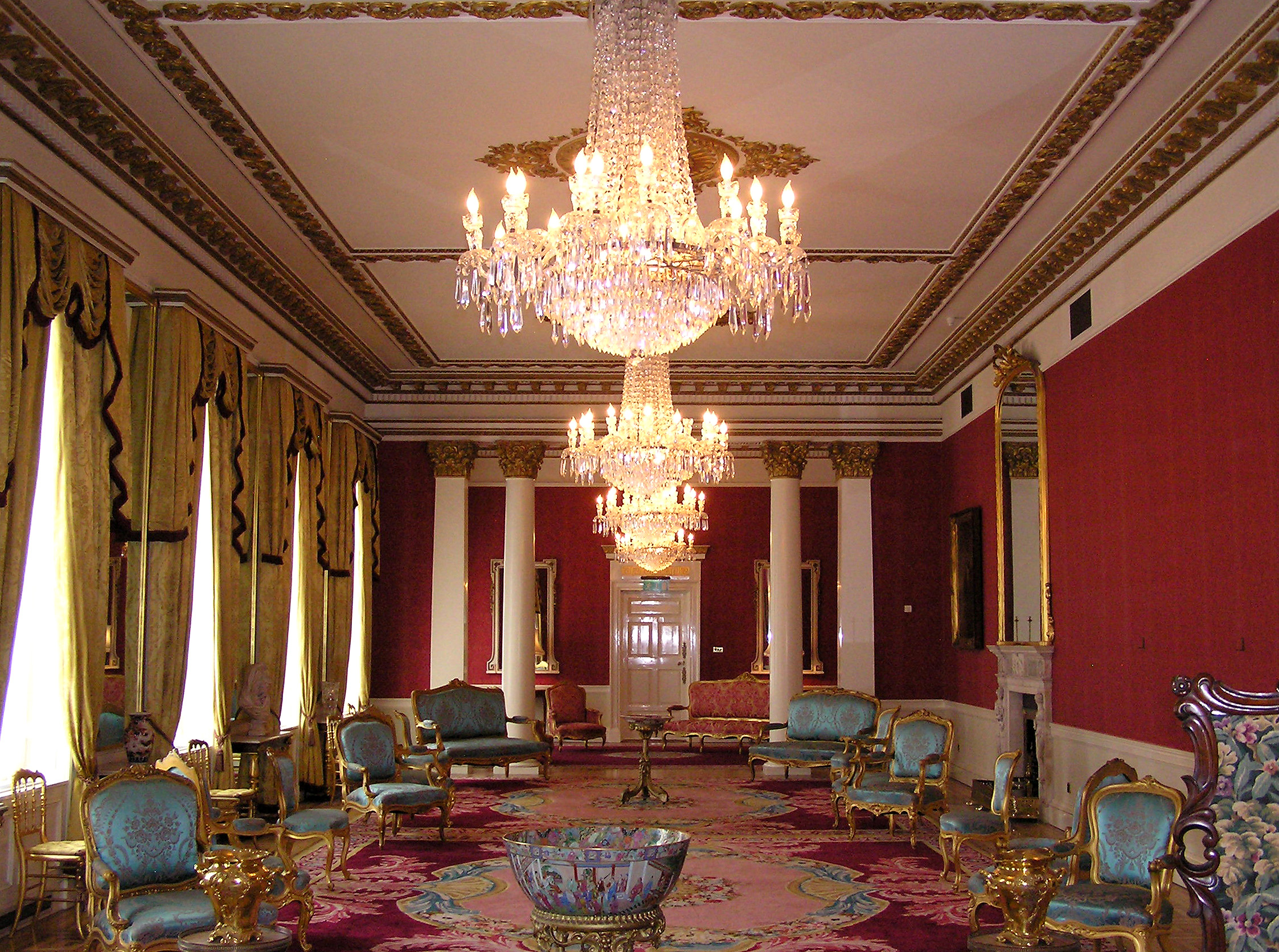
State Drawing Room

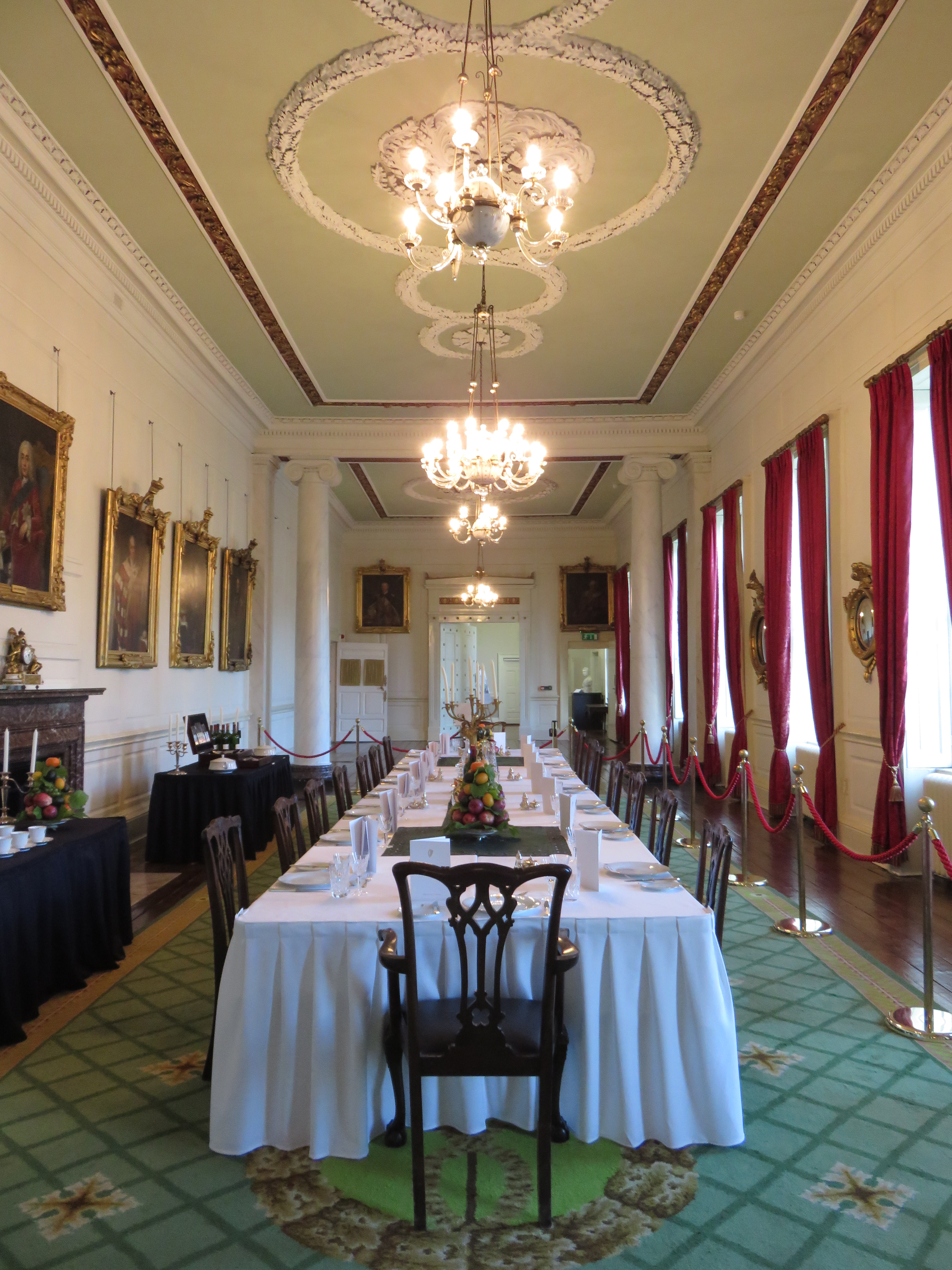
Portrait Gallery

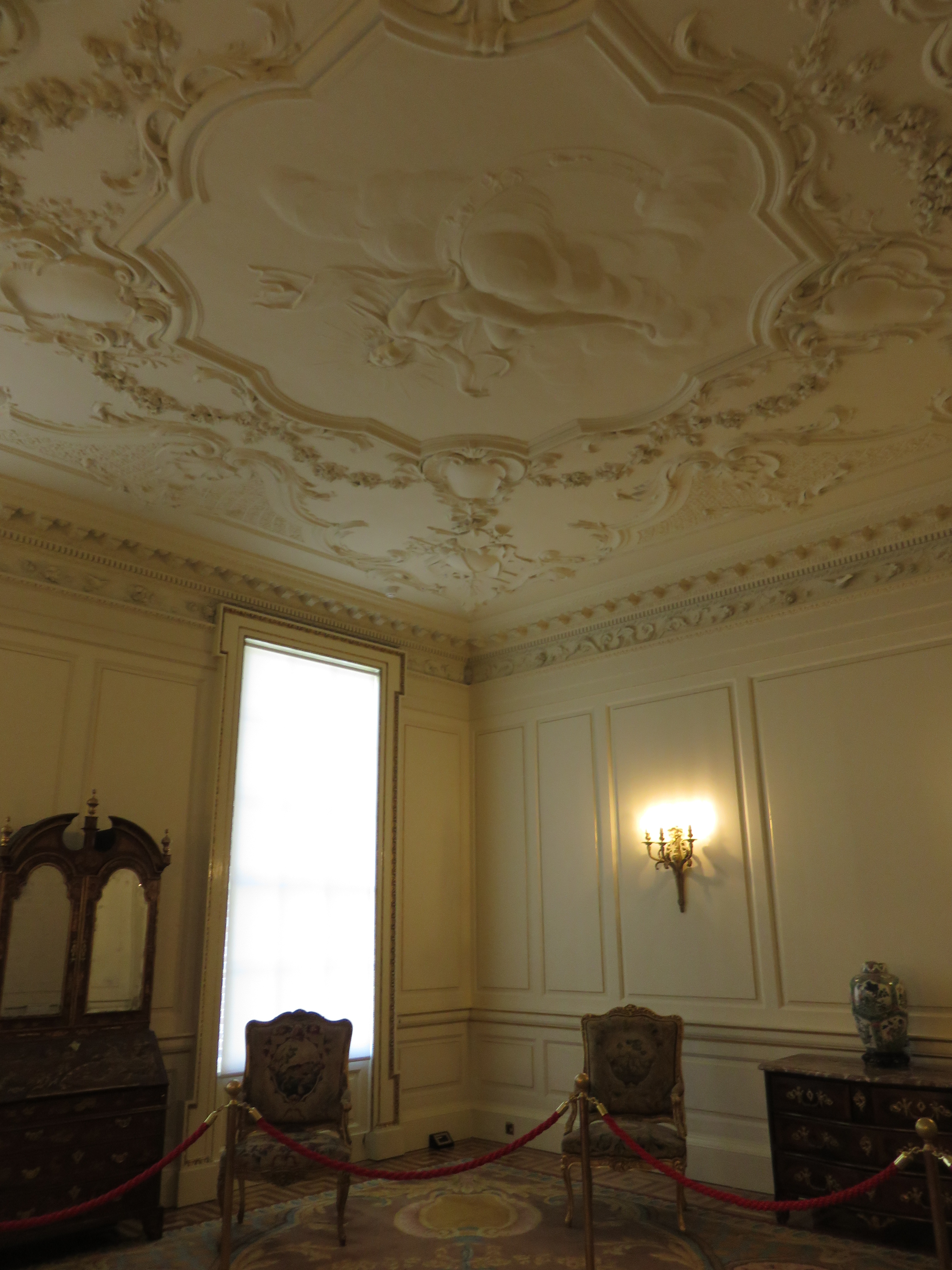
Apollo Room

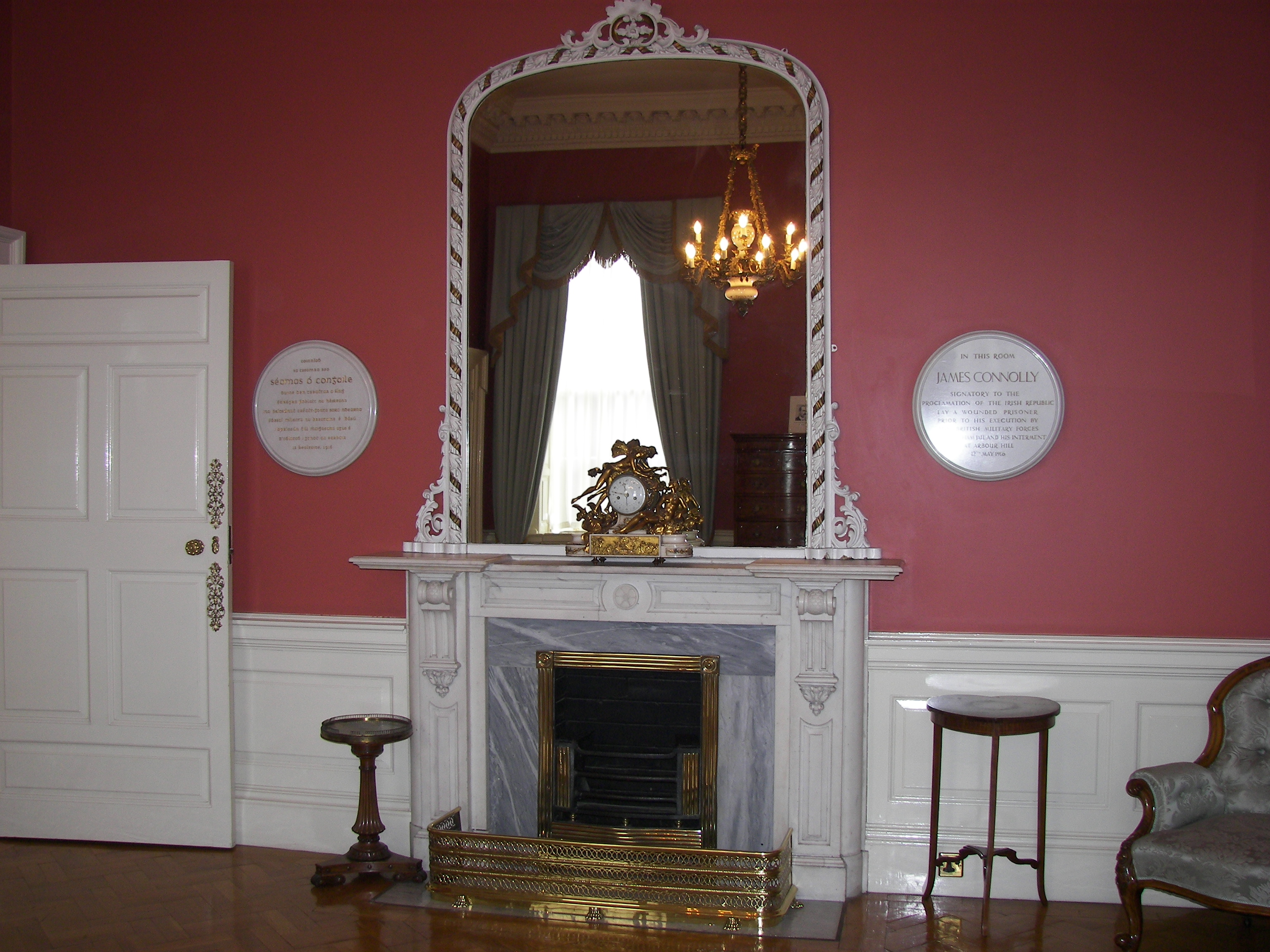
Connolly Room

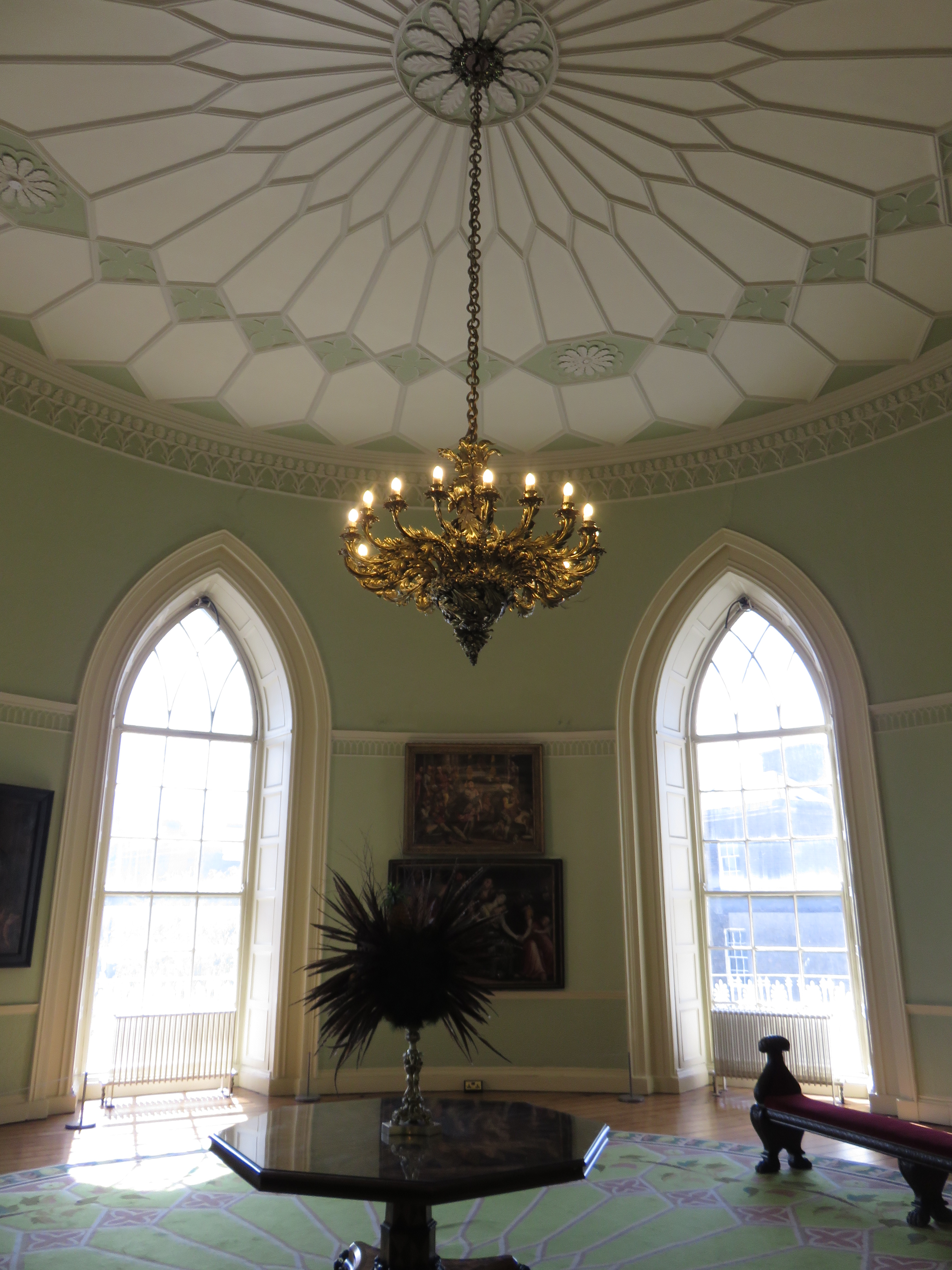
Gothic Room

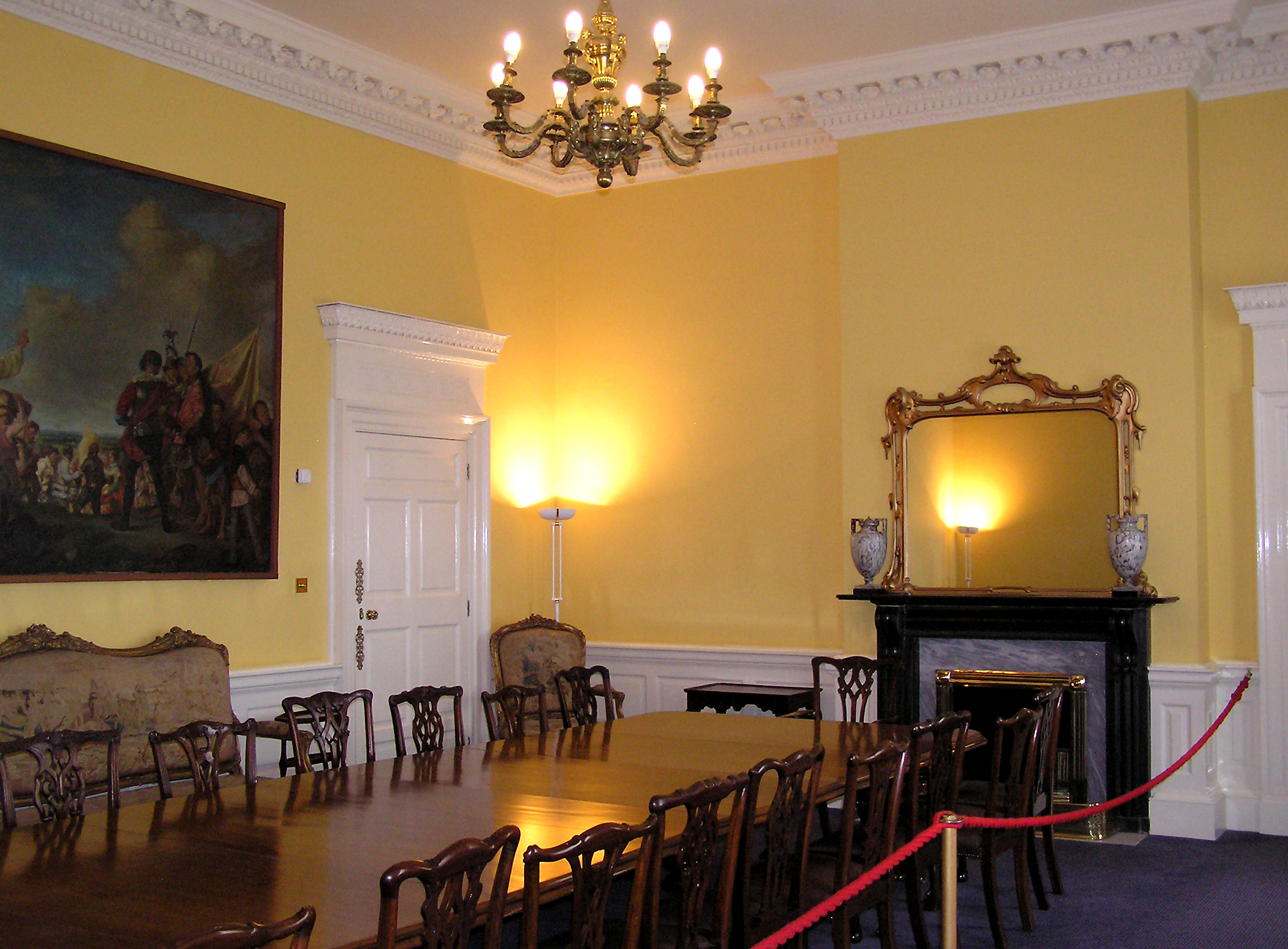
Yellow Room

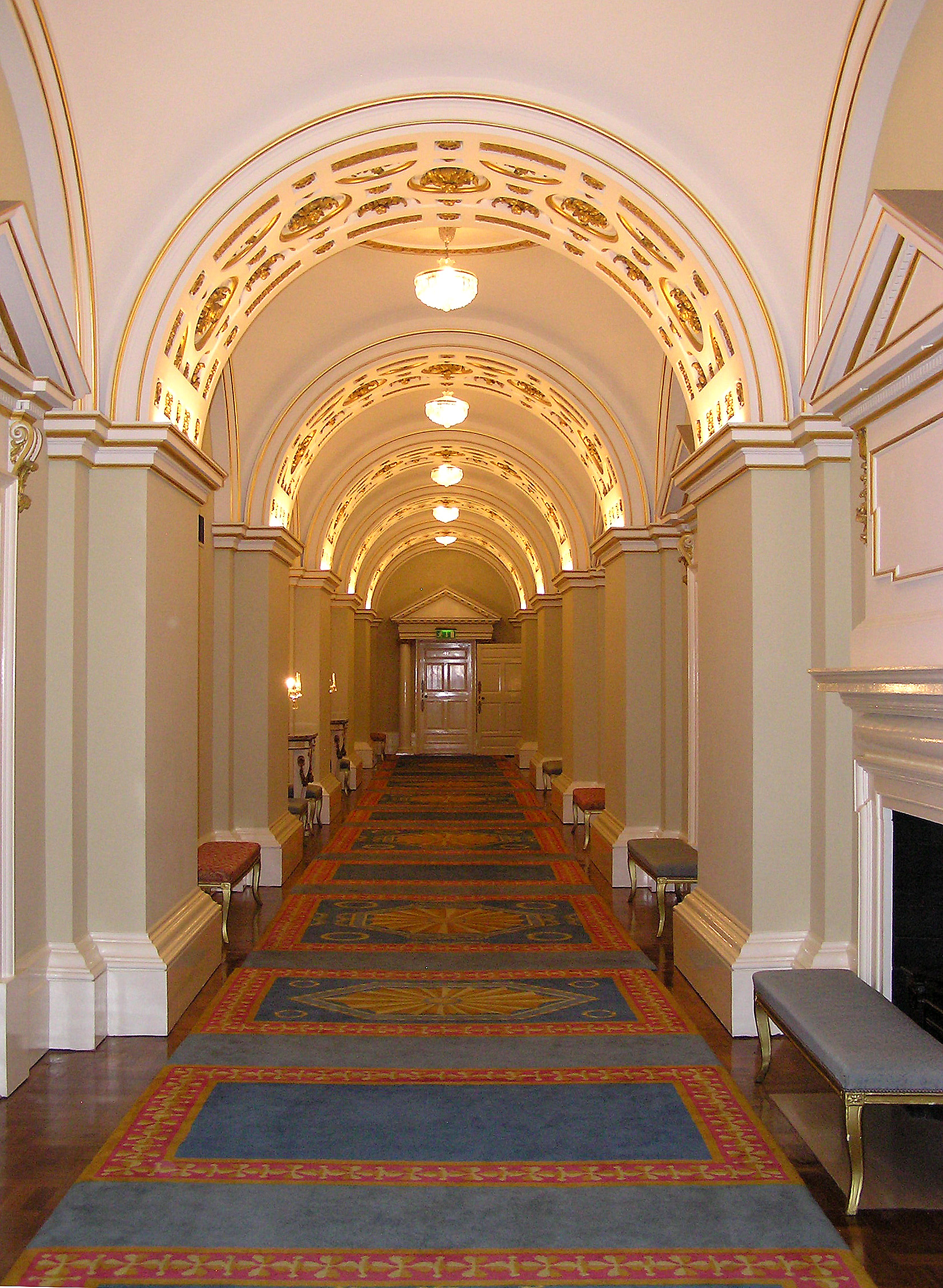
State Corridor

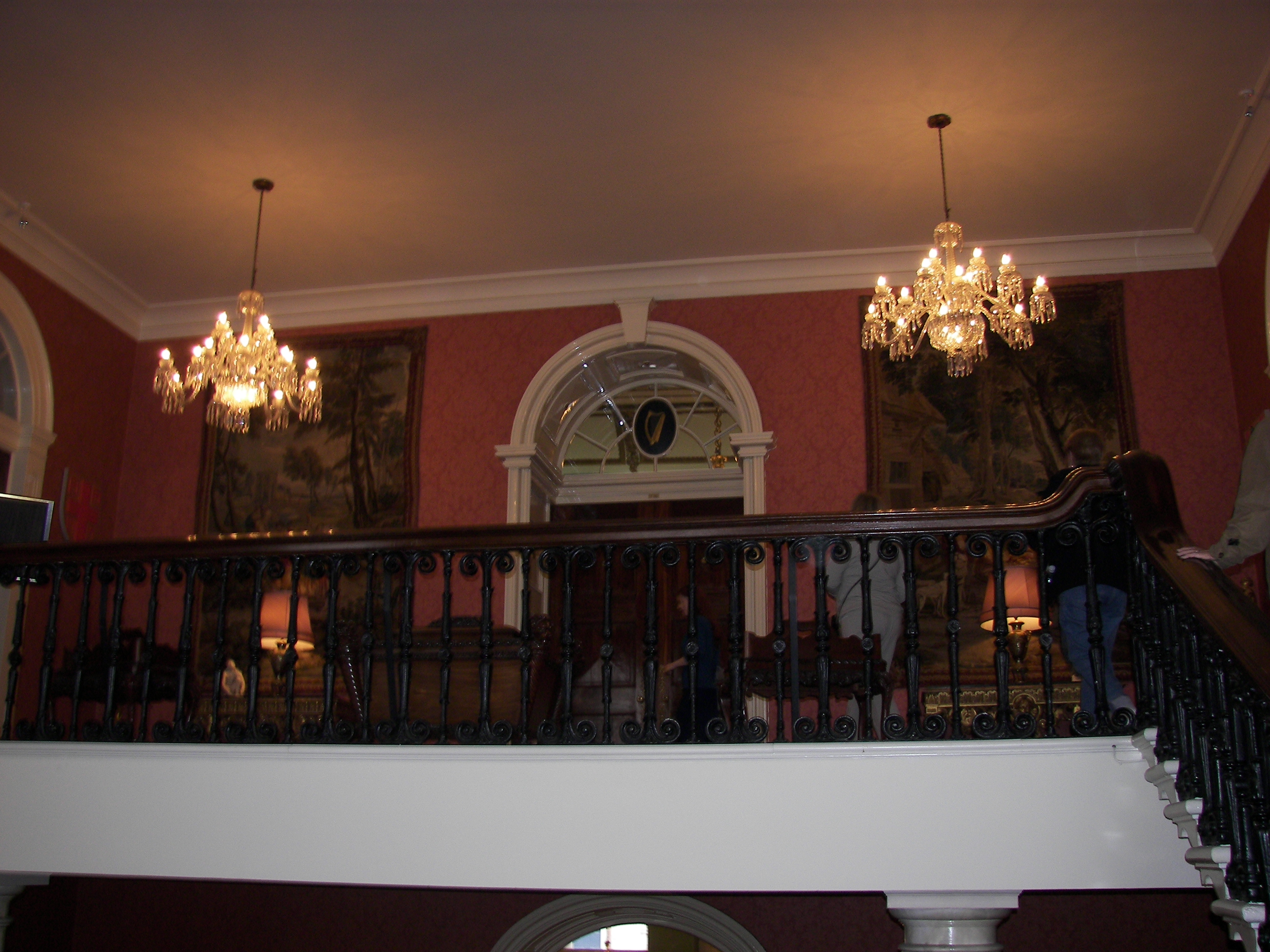
Battleaxe Landing

== Towers ==
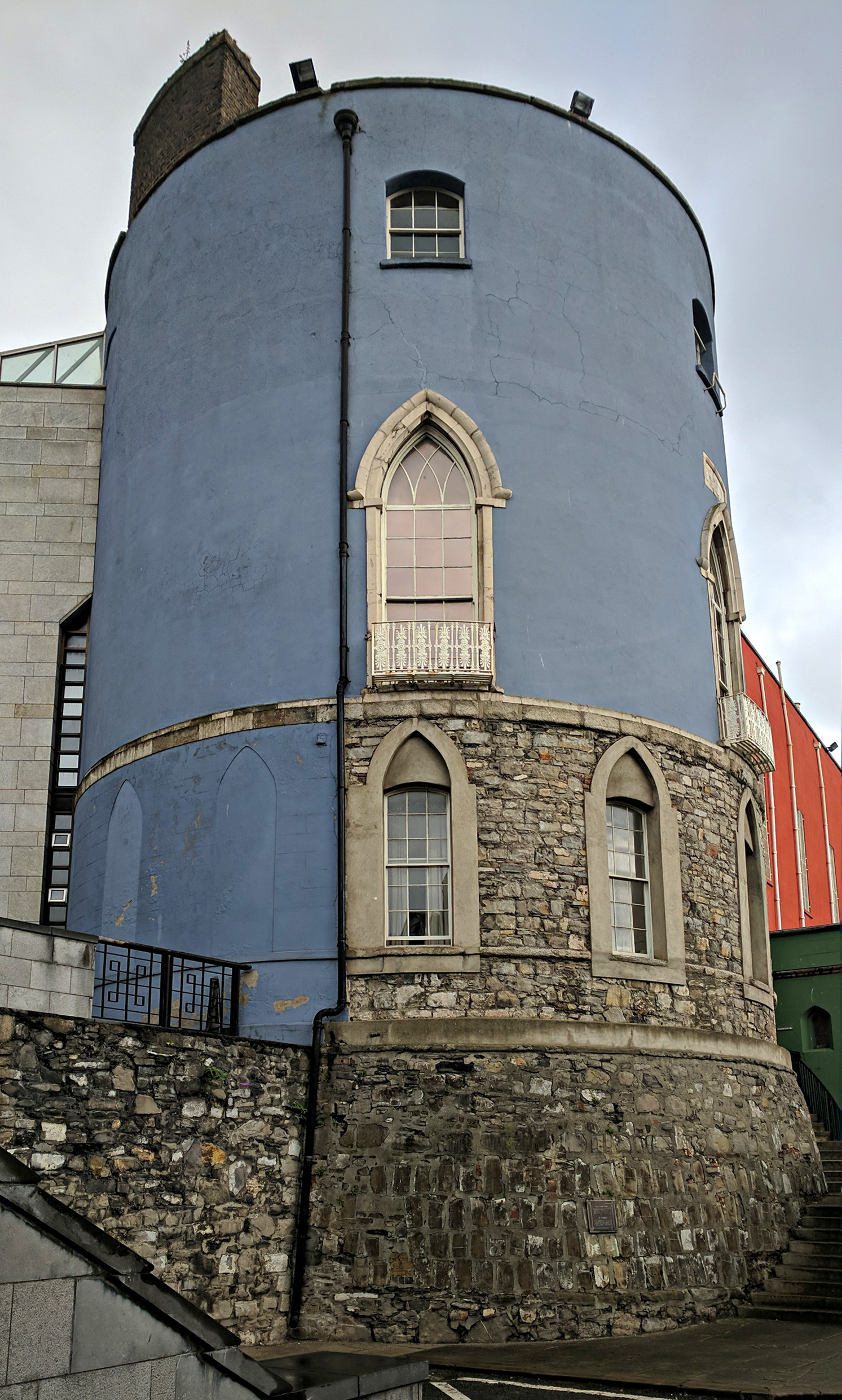
Bermingham Tower at the southwest corner of Dublin Castle

The castle complex includes two surviving towers and the foundations of several others.

Bermingham Tower
The base of the original Bermingham Tower is one of the few remaining parts of the original castle. At the southwest corner of the castle, the tower has a modern upper part. It is unclear which member of the De Bermingham family the tower was named for; perhaps William or Walter or John or Sir Walter.

Record Tower
The Record Tower at the southeast corner is another original part of the castle. Also known as the Wardrobe Tower, it originally dates from the 1220s. It was restored between 1810 and 1813 by Francis Johnston. It hosted the Garda Museum until its 2017 relaunch in the Treasury Building.

Bedford Tower
Construction of Bedford Tower began in 1750, and was completed in 1761 by Thomas Eyre. The Guard House mirrors it.

Powder Tower
The base of this tower can be seen in the basement of the northeast corner of the lower castle yard. It was also known as the Storehouse Tower and was built around 1228. Its calp walls were 3.7 metres thick, and the internal diameter was 6.1 metres. The base of this tower is still along the flow of the River Poddle. Surviving Viking defences remain under this section of the Castle.

Cork Tower
This tower stood at the northwest corner of the medieval enclosure. The base remains behind the west range of the upper castle yard.

== Popular media ==
Dublin Castle has appeared in numerous films including Barry Lyndon, Michael Collins, Becoming Jane and The Medallion, as well as the television series The Tudors, where it doubles as the Vatican in the pilot.

Part of Dublin Castle appears on the cover of the Jandek album Khartoum Variations.

In George Moore's A Drama in Muslin, Dublin Castle appears in a number of chapters as the venue for high society events associated with the Viceroy and the British administration in Dublin.

== See also ==
- Castles in Great Britain and Ireland
- Chapel Royal
- Dublin Castle administration in Ireland
- List of castles in Ireland
