= Charles Monck =

Charles Monck may refer to:

- Charles Monck (1678–1751), Irish MP for Newcastle and Inistiogue
- Charles Monck, 1st Viscount Monck (1754–1802)
- Charles Monck, 3rd Viscount Monck (1791–1849)
- Charles Monck, 4th Viscount Monck (1819–1894)
- Sir Charles Monck, 6th Baronet (1779–1867)
