= Séamus Butler =

Irish hurler from Tipperary

Personal information
- Native name: Séamus de Buitléir (Irish)
- Born: Drom, County Tipperary

Sport
- Sport: Hurling
- Position: Forward
Club
- Years: Club
- Drom & Inch
Inter-county
Years	County	Apps (scores)
2004-2008	Tipperary	14 (2-14)
Inter-county titles
- Munster titles: 1
- All-Irelands: 0
- NHL: 1

Séamus Butler (born 1980) is an Irish sportsperson. He plays hurling with his local club Drom & Inch, and is a former Tipperary senior inter-county hurler.

== Early life ==
Seamus Butler was born near Nenagh, County Tipperary in 1980. His father, Tommy Butler, played with Tipperary in the 1970s and collected an All-Star award in 1978. Seamus Butler was educated locally and later attended the Tipperary Institute where he collected a Ryan Cup medal in 2003.

== Playing career ==
=== Club ===
Butler has played his club hurling with his local Drom & Inch club. At underage levels he won a county minor medal and two county under-21 titles. In 2005 Drom & Inch took on Thurles Sarsfields in the senior county final. In spite of losing the game Butler scored 11 points in that game. In 2006 and 2008 Butler won Mid-Tipperary Senior hurling titles with the club.

=== Inter-county ===
Butler first came to prominence on the inter-county scene as a member of the Tipperary minor hurling team in the late 1990s. He won a Munster medal in this grade as a substitute in 1997, however, there was no further success in the All-Ireland series. Four years later in 2001 Butler was captain of the Tipperary under-21 team that lost the Munster final to Limerick. The following year Butler made his senior competitive debut in a National Hurling League game against Cork. It would be 2004, however, before Butler made his senior championship debut against Waterford. In 2008 Butler collected National Hurling League and Munster Senior Hurling Championship medals. Butler was not selected for the Tipperary squad for 2009.
