= Charles Monck, 4th Viscount Monck =

British politician and first Governor General of Canada (1819–1894)

His Excellency The Right Honourable The Viscount Monck GCMG PC
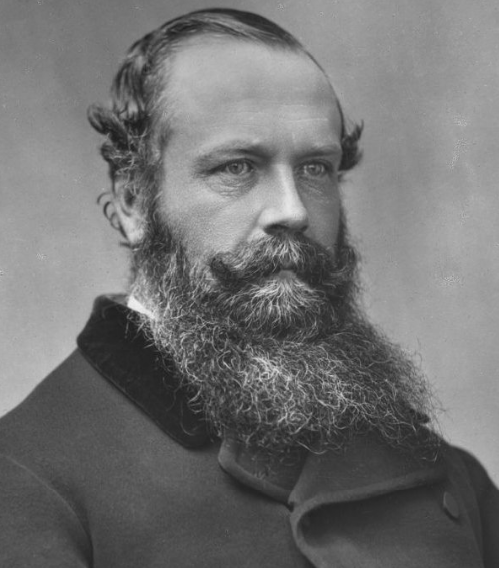
- The Viscount Monck in 1880

1st Governor General of Canada
- In office 1 July 1861 – 14 November 1868
- Monarch: Victoria
- Prime Minister: John A. Macdonald
- Prime Minister (United Kingdom): Earl of Derby; Benjamin Disraeli
- Preceded by: New position
- Succeeded by: Sir John Young, Bt.

Personal details
- Born: Charles Stanley Monck; 10 October 1819 Templemore, County Tipperary, Ireland
- Died: 29 November 1894 (aged 75) Enniskerry, County Wicklow, Ireland
- Spouse: Lady Elizabeth Monck (m. 1844; died 1892)
- Relations: Charles Monck, 1st Viscount Monck (grandfather); Henry Monck, 1st Earl of Rathdowne (uncle)
- Children: 4
- Education: Trinity College, Dublin (B.A.)

Charles Stanley Monck, 4th Viscount Monck (10 October 1819 – 29 November 1894) was a British politician who served as the last governor-general of the Province of Canada and the first Governor General of Canada after Canadian Confederation.

== Early life ==
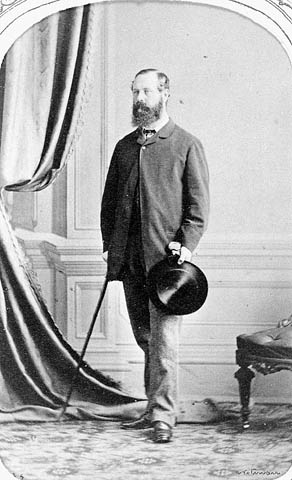
The Viscount Monck in 1868

Charles Stanley Monck was born in Templemore, County Tipperary, Ireland. He was the son of Charles Monck and his wife Bridget née Willington. His father was the younger son of Charles Monck, 1st Viscount Monck and the former Anne Quin. After his grandfather's death in 1802, the viscountcy had been inherited by his father's elder brother, Henry Monck, who in 1822 was further created Earl of Rathdowne. However, in 1848, Lord Rathdowne died without male heirs (albeit with many daughters), the earldom became extinct, and Monck's father succeeded as 3rd Viscount. His maternal grandparents were John Willington of Killoskehan Castle in Barnane, and the former Bridget Butler (daughter of Theobald Butler of Knocka Castle in Drom).

== Career ==
Monck obtained a law degree from Trinity College Dublin. He married his cousin Lady Elizabeth Monck (one of Lord Rathdowne's daughters) in 1844, and in 1849 he inherited his father's title as 4th Viscount Monck. In 1852 he was elected MP for Portsmouth (as an Irish peer, he had no seat in the House of Lords), and from 1855 to 1858 he served as Lord of the Treasury under Lord Palmerston.

=== Governor General of Canada ===
In 1861, he was appointed Governor General of British North America as well as Governor of the Province of Canada. Lord and Lady Monck and their children came to Canada, but they did not remain throughout his term of office as Governor General of Canada. The family resided at Spencerwood in Quebec during most of their stay in Canada.

During this time, the Canadian colonies were beginning to organise themselves into a federation. The American Civil War had just broken out, and the Trent Affair caused diplomatic tension between the United States and Britain. The Canadian government was eager to gain some measure of independence during this turbulent period. The Quebec Conference, the Charlottetown Conference, and the London Conference, at which the details of confederation were discussed, all took place during Monck's time as governor. Monck supported the idea, and worked closely with John A. Macdonald, George Brown, George-Étienne Cartier, and Étienne-Paschal Taché, who formed the "Great Coalition" in 1864.

In 1866, Monck was created a peer of the United Kingdom with the title Baron Monck, which gave him a seat in the House of Lords. When the Canadian colonies became a semi-independent dominion the next year, Monck became the country's first Governor General. Monck was also responsible for establishing Rideau Hall as the residence of the Governor General in Ottawa.

=== Later life ===
In 1869, Monck was succeeded by Sir John Young (later Lord Lisgar). He returned home to Ireland, where he became Lord Lieutenant of Dublin in 1874. From 1870-72, he presided over a Commission of Inquiry into the King's Inns, Dublin.

== Personal life ==
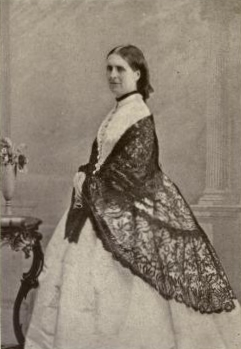
Lady Elizabeth Louise Mary Monck by William Notman

On 23 June 1844, he married Lady Elizabeth Louise Mary Monck, his first cousin and the daughter of his uncle Henry, the 2nd Viscount, who had been made Earl of Rathdowne in 1822. Together, they were the parents of two sons and two daughters:

- Hon. Frances Mary Monck (d. 1930), who married the Rev. Richard Aslatt Pearce.
- Hon. Elizabeth Louise Mary Monck (d. 1913), who married John Macdonald Royse.
- Henry Power Charles Stanley Monck, 5th Viscount Monck (1849–1927), who married Lady Edith Caroline Sophia Scott, the fourth daughter of John Scott, 3rd Earl of Clonmell, in 1874.
- Hon. Richard Charles Stanley Mountjoy Monck (1858–1892), who married Alice Ann Lymer in 1879.

Lady Monck died in June 1892, aged 78. He died in November 1894, aged 75.

== Arms ==
Coat of arms of Charles Monck, 4th Viscount Monck
Crest A dragon passant, wings addorsed, sable. Escutcheon Gules, a chevron between three lions' heads erased argent. Supporters Dexter, a dragon, wings addorsed argent langued gules holding over the dexter shoulder a laurel branch fructed proper; Sinister, a lion argent, langued gules, holding over the sinister shoulder a laurel branch fructed proper. Motto “Fortiter, fideliter, feliciter.” (Boldly, faithfully, happily). Orders The Most Distinguished Order of St. Michael and St. George - Knight Grand Cross (GCMG).

Parliament of the United Kingdom
Preceded by Sir George Staunton, Bt; Francis Baring	Member of Parliament for Portsmouth; 1852–1857; With: Francis Baring	Succeeded by Sir James Dalrymple-Horn-Elphinstone; Francis Baring
Political offices
Preceded by Lord Alfred Hervey; Lord Elcho	Junior Lord of the Treasury; 1855–1858	Succeeded by Lord Henry Lennox; Thomas Edward Taylor; Henry Whitmore
Government offices
Preceded by Sir Edmund Walker Head, Bt	Governor General of the Province of Canada; 1861–1867	Position abolished
Preceded by Sir Edmund Walker Head, Bt	Captain General and Governor in Chief of Canada; 1861–1867	Position abolished
New office	Governor General of Canada; 1867–1868	Succeeded by The Lord Lisgar
Honorary titles
Preceded by The Earl of Howth	Lord Lieutenant of Dublin; 1874–1892	Succeeded by Ion Hamilton
Peerage of Ireland
Preceded by Charles Monck	Viscount Monck; 1849–1894	Succeeded by Henry Monck
Peerage of the United Kingdom
New creation	Baron Monck; 1866–1894	Succeeded by Henry Monck
