= Charles Monck, 3rd Viscount Monck =

Charles Joseph Kelly Monck, 3rd Viscount Monck (created 1800) and 3rd Baron Monck (1797) of Ballytrammon, County Wexford, in the Peerage of Ireland (12 July 1791 – 24 April 1849), succeeded to his titles on the death of his brother, Henry. He was the son of Charles Monck, 1st Viscount Monck, and Anne Quin. While his brother's earldom became extinct, the viscountcy devolved upon Charles. On 29 November 1817, he married Bridget Willington, the daughter of John Willington of Killoskehan Castle, Barnane, and Bridget Butler, the daughter of Theobald Butler of Knocka Castle, Drom, County Tipperary.

Lewis' directory of 1837 lists the principal landowners in the locality at the time:

"Lloydsborough is the seat of J. Lloyd, Esq.; part of the demesne is in Killea, though the mansion is in the parish of Templemore; it is a handsome residence in a well-planted demesne. The other principal seats are Woodville Lodge, the residence of D. J. Webb, Esq.; Belleville, of the Hon. C. J. K. Monck; and Eastwood, of T. Bennett, Esq.".

Viscount Monck died in Dublin, in the house his father built, currently the site of the Merrion Hotel. He was, however, buried in his wife's parish of Templemore. A street in town was formerly named after him.

== Issue ==
- Charles Monck, 4th Viscount Monck, Governor General of Canada, who was born in Templemore. On 23 July 1844, he married his cousin, Lady Elizabeth Louise Mary Monck, who was the co-heir of her father Henry, at the family estate in Enniskerry - Charleville.
- John Willington Monck (born 9 October 1820)
- Captain William Monck (born 28 February 1823, died 20 September 1854)
- Lt.-Gen. Richard Monck (born 23 October 1829, died 7 October 1904)
- Anne Monck (died 23 Sep 1853)
- Isabela Bridget
- Henrietta Monck (died 6 May 1911), who married Francis Brooke and had six children.

Peerage of Ireland
Preceded by Henry Monck	Viscount Monck; 1848–1849	Succeeded by Charles Monck
