= Frederic Hervey Foster Quin =

British homeopath

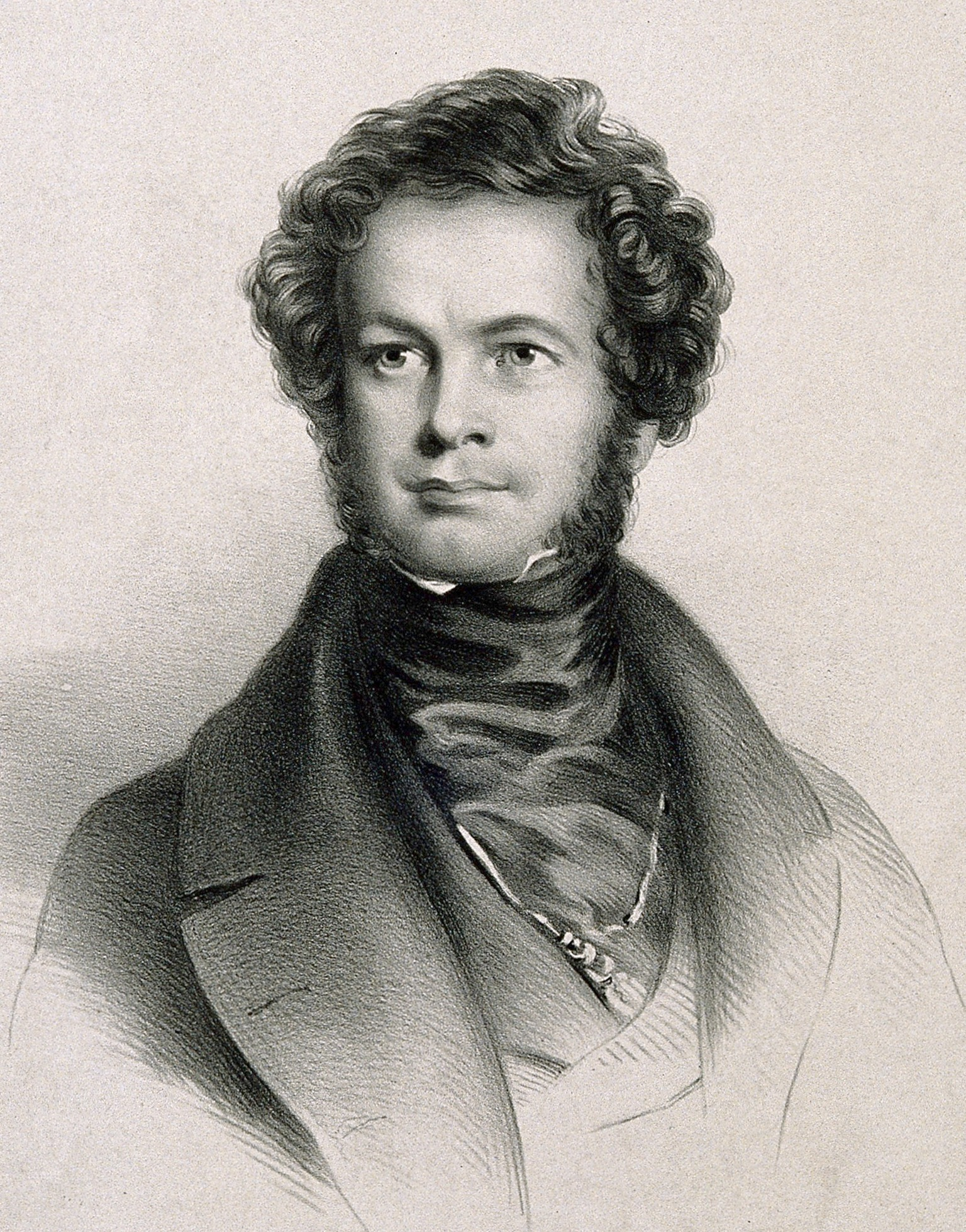
Frederick Foster Quin

Frederic Hervey Foster Quin (12 February 1799 – 24 November 1878) was the first homeopathic physician in England.

== Early life and education ==
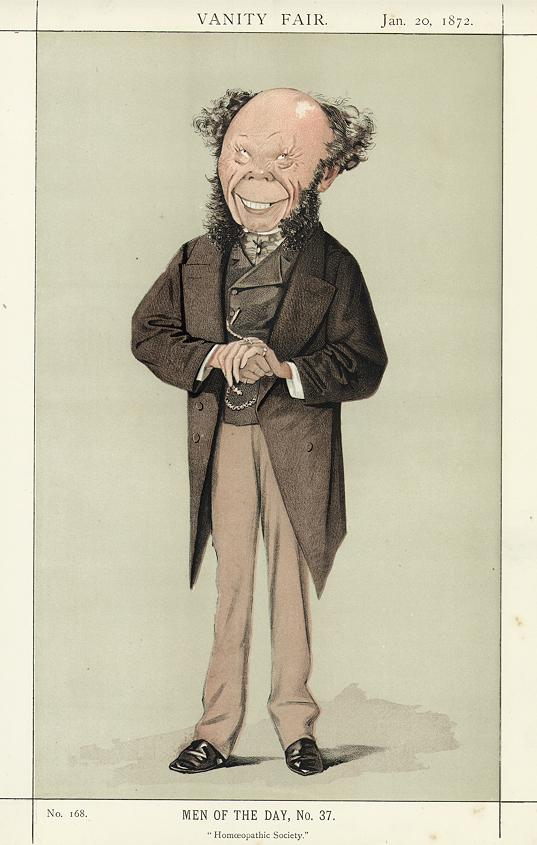
Quin by Adriano Cecioni in Vanity Fair, 1872

Quin's place of birth has been concluded, based on recent research, to have been Ireland; although per some past theories he has been incorrectly regarded as the son of Lady Elizabeth Foster, née Hervey, mistress and later second wife of the fifth Duke of Devonshire, more recent research has concluded he may have been her godson. On the basis of Lady Elizabeth's alleged affair with Valentine Quin, 1st Earl of Dunraven and Mount-Earl, this earlier research suggested he was Quin's father, but alternatively also suggested the Irish journalist, bookseller, and collector, Henry George Quin (1760–1805), of Trinity College, Dublin. Quin passed his early years at a school at Putney, kept by a son of Mrs. Sarah Trimmer, the author. In 1817 he was sent to the University of Edinburgh, where he graduated M.D. on 1 August 1820.

== Career ==
In December 1820 he went to Rome as travelling physician to his likely godmother Elizabeth, now Duchess of Devonshire. He afterwards attended her in that city during her fatal illness in March 1824. On his return to London he was appointed physician to Napoleon I at St. Helena, but the emperor died (on 5 May 1821) before he left England. In July 1821 he commenced practice at Naples, and his social gifts made him popular with all the English residents there, who included Sir William Gell, Sir William Drummond, and the Countess of Blessington. At Naples, too, Quin met Dr. Neckar, a disciple of Samuel Hahnemann, the founder of homeopathy, and was favourably impressed by what he learned of the homeopathic system of medicine. After visiting Leipzig in 1826, to study its working, Quin returned to Naples a convert. On the journey he was introduced at Rome to Prince Leopold of Saxe-Coburg, afterwards king of the Belgians, and soon left Naples to become his family physician in England. Until May 1829 he continued a member of the prince's household either at Marlborough House, London, or Claremont, Surrey, and extended his acquaintance in aristocratic circles. From May 1829 to September 1831 he practised in Paris, chiefly, but not entirely, on the principles of Hahnemann. In September 1831, after consulting with Hahnemann as to the treatment of cholera, he proceeded to Tischnowitz in Moravia, where the disease was raging. He was himself attacked, but soon recommenced work, and remained until the cholera disappeared. His treatment consisted in giving camphor in the first stage, and ipecacuanha and arsenic subsequently.

At length, in July 1832, he settled in London at 19 King Street, St. James's, re- moving in 1833 to 13 Stratford Place, and introduced the homeopathic system into this country. The medical journals denounced him as a quack, but he made numerous converts, and his practice rapidly grew, owing as much to his attractive personality as to his medical skill. But the professional opposition was obstinately prolonged. In February 1838, when Quin was a candidate for election at the Athenæum Club, he was opposed by a clique of physicians, led by John Ayrton Paris, who privately attacked Quin with a virulence for which he had to apologise. From 26 June 1845 he was medical attendant to the Duchess of Cambridge.

In 1839 Quin completed the first volume of his translation of Hahnemann's Materia Medica Pura, but a fire at his printers' destroyed the whole edition of five hundred copies, and failing health prevented him from reprinting the work. In 1843 he established a short-lived dispensary, called the St. James's Homœopathic Dispensary. In 1844 he founded the British Homeopathic Society, of which he was elected president. Chiefly through his exertions the London Homeopathic Hospital was founded in 1850. It became a permanent institution, and is now located in Great Ormond Street. On 18 October 1859 he was appointed to the chair of therapeutics and materia medica in the medical school of the hospital, and gave a series of lectures.

Quin was popular in London society. In aristocratic, literary, artistic, and dramatic circles he was always welcome. He was almost the last of the wits of London society, and no dinner was considered a success without his presence. His friends included Charles Dickens, William Thackeray, the Bulwers, Macready, Landseer, and Charles Mathews. In manners, dress, and love of high-stepping horses he imitated Count D'Orsay. After suffering from severe and chronic asthma and arthritis, which resulted in retirement from medical practice, he died of bronchitis at the Garden Mansions, Queen Anne's Gate, Westminster, on 24 November 1878, and was buried in Kensal Green Cemetery on 28 November.

== Works ==
- Du Traitement Homœopathique du Choléra avec notes et appendice, Paris, 1832, dedicated to Louis-Philippe.
- Pharmacopœia Homœopathica, 1834, dedicated to the king of the Belgians.

He also wrote a preface to the British Homœopathic Pharmacopœia, published by the British Homœopathic Society in 1870, and was the editor of the second edition brought out in 1876.
