= Mossop =

Mossop, a surname of English origin, may refer to:

- Sir Allan Mossop (1887–1965), Chief Judge of the British Supreme Court for China
- Brian Mossop, the complainant in Canada (Attorney General) v. Mossop (1993)
- Henry Mossop (1729–1773), Irish actor
- Irene Mossop (1904–1988), British writer
- Jennifer Mossop, Canadian politician
- John Mossop (born 1959), Australian rules footballer
- Lee Mossop (born 1989), English rugby league footballer
- Rex Mossop (1928-2011), Australian dual-code rugby footballer
- William Mossop (1751–1805), Irish medallist and founder of the art in Ireland
