= Éamonn Buckley =

Irish hurler

Eamonn Buckley
Personal information
- Native name: Éamon Ó Buachalla (Irish)
- Born: 9 March 1982 (age 44) County Tipperary

Sport
- Sport: Hurling
- Position: Corner-back
Club
- Years: Club
- Drom & Inch
Inter-county
| Years | County | Apps (scores) |
| 2007-2009 | Tipperary | 10 (0-0) |
Inter-county titles
- Munster titles: 2
- NHL: 1

Éamonn Buckley (born 9 March 1982 in Drom, County Tipperary) is an Irish sportsperson. He plays hurling with his local club Drom & Inch and with the Tipperary senior inter-county team.

== Playing career ==
=== Club ===
Buckley plays his club hurling with his local Drom & Inch club and has enjoyed some success. He won a mid-Tipperary senior hurling title in 2006, 2008 and 2009. Buckley also was on the victorious Drom & Inch team that won the club's first Dan Breen.

=== Inter-county ===
Buckley first came to prominence on the inter-county scene as a member of the Tipperary under-21 hurling team in 2003. That year he won a Munster title in that grade at corner-back, however, further success at All-Ireland level eluded him. Buckley later progressed onto the county's senior panel. He mad ehis competitive debut in the 2005 National Hurling League, however, his championship debut came two years later in 2007 against Limerick. A three-game saga saw Limerick emerge victorious as Tipp endured an unhappy season. A change of manage rin 2008 saw Buckley taste his first major success as Tipp captured the National League title for the first time since 2001.

== Sources ==
- Tipperary Player Profiles
