= Drom & Inch GAA =

Sport club in Tipperary, Ireland

Drom & Inch
- An Drom agus An Inse
- Founded: 1887
- County: Tipperary
- Colours: Green and White
- Grounds: Bouladuff
- Coordinates: 52°43′09″N 7°54′45″W

Playing kits
Standard colours

Senior Club Championships
	All Ireland	Munster champions	Tipperary champions
Hurling:	-	-	1
Camogie:	-	4	11

Drom & Inch GAA is a Gaelic Athletic Association (GAA) club which is located in County Tipperary, Ireland. The club fields hurling and Gaelic football teams in Mid-Tipperary divisional competitions and in competitions organised by Tipperary GAA. The club is centred on the villages Drom, Inch and Barnane which lie near the Devil's Bit mountain range. The club's main grounds is located in Bouladuff, five miles outside Thurles. It is located on the main Thurles to Nenagh R498 road. The club's second pitch is located in Drom Village on the road from Borrisoleigh to Templemore. The club won its first ever Tipperary Senior Hurling Championship in 2011 after a 1–19 to 2–14 win against Clonoulty–Rossmore GAA.

== History ==
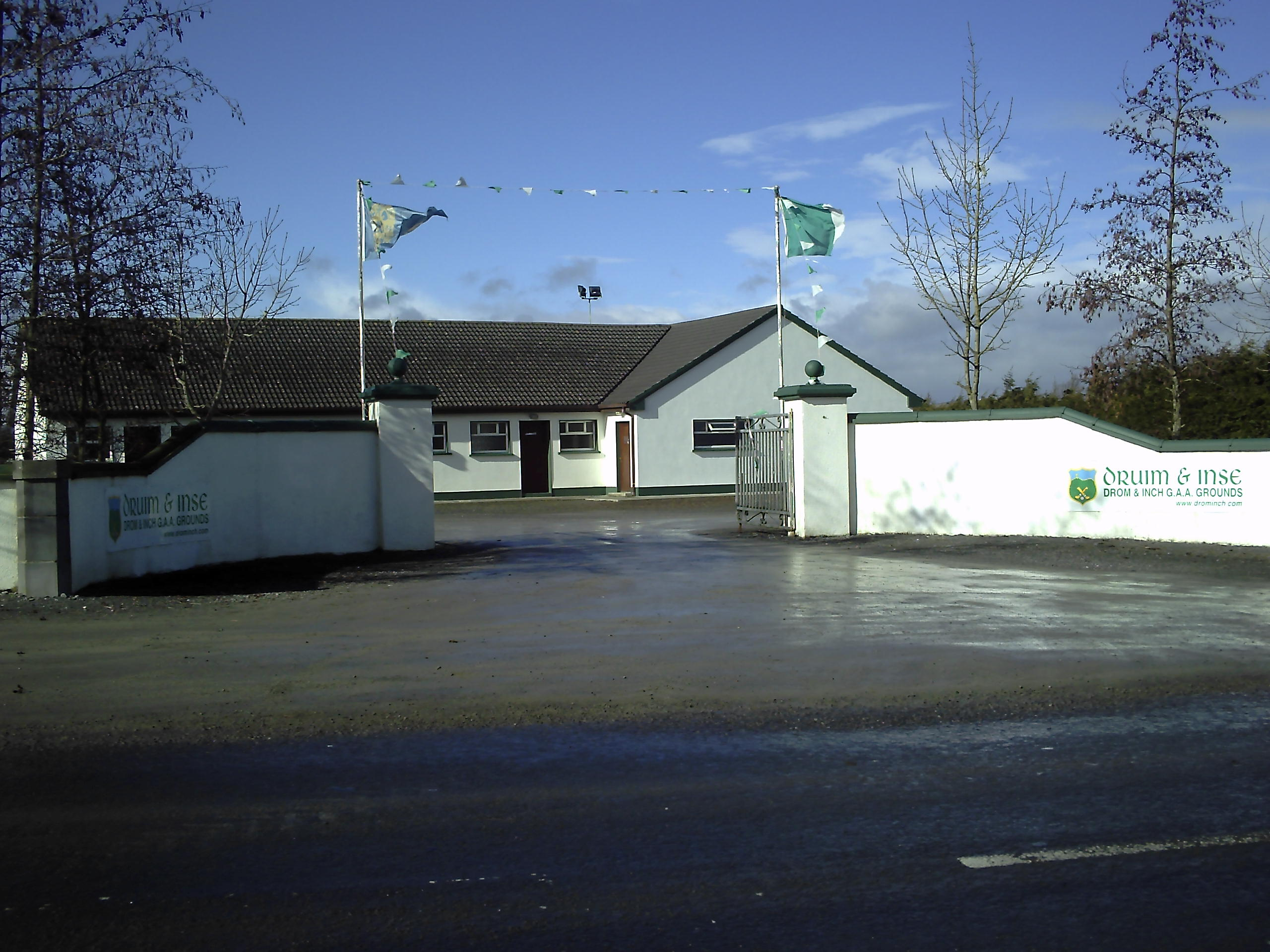
Drom and Inch GAA Club Bouladuff

Drom & Inch GAA club has its origins in 1887, when hurling was played by the separate County Tipperary teams of Drom, and Inch. In addition to the club's main ground in Bouladuff, the club has a second pitch in Drom village. The facilities include four dressing rooms, a kitchen, male & female toilets, meeting room, hydrotherapy tank, scoreboard, dugouts, sandbank, ball-wall and roofed stand.

Players from Drom & Inch have previously represented Tipperary in All Ireland competitions, including in 2008 when four members of the Tipperary team that won the National Hurling League and Munster Championship were from the parish. These were Séamus Butler, Séamus Callinan, Éamonn Buckley and James Woodlock.

Drom & Inch have won county titles in hurling at several grades, including at Senior level. In 2011, the club's hurling team was crowned Tipperary Senior Hurling Champions for the first time in their history. Adding to the senior win in 2011, the minor B hurlers and Junior B hurlers both won county titles.

In 2024, the U21 team won a County U21A Hurling title in Templederry.

== Honours ==
=== Hurling ===
- Tipperary Senior Hurling Championship (1): 2011
- Tipperary Intermediate Hurling Championship (1): 1970
- Tipperary Junior A Hurling Championship (3): 1937, 1970, 2005
- Tipperary Junior B Hurling Championship (2) : 2011, 2019, 2023

=== Football ===
- Tipperary Intermediate Football Championship (2): 2014, 2021
- Tipperary Junior A Football Championship (2): 1975, 2013

=== Camogie ===
- Munster Senior Club Camogie Championship (4): 2008, 2011, 2020, 2022
- Tipperary Senior Camogie Championship (11): 1974, 1975, 1976, 1982, 2003, 2008, 2011, 2019, 2020, 2021, 2022, 2023

== Notable players ==
=== Inter-county players ===
Inter-county players, associated with the club, include:

- Éamonn Buckley
- Paudie Butler
- Séamus Butler
- Tommy Butler
- Séamus Callanan
- Pat Looby
- Johnny Ryan
- James Woodlock

=== All-Ireland winners ===
All-Ireland medal winners from the club include Dick Byron who was the first All-Ireland minor medal winner in the parish in 1936. He was followed by Eamon Bourke in 1952 and Pat Looby won an All Ireland minor medal in 1976. Looby followed this with an All-Ireland U21 medal in 1979, and finished his All-Ireland collection with a Masters All-Ireland in 2003.

Stephen Kenny of Dovea won a senior hurling medal with Tipperary in 1925 and was also on the first Tipperary team to tour America. Seamus Bannon won All-Ireland Senior Hurling medals with Tipperary in 1949, 1950 and 1951. Eamonn Butler captained the county Intermediate team that won the all-Ireland in 1971. Also representing Drom that day were Seamus Butler, Oliver Quinn and Jim Carey.

On 5 September 2010, Séamus Callanan and James Woodlock won all Ireland Senior medals with Tipperary. Callanan subsequently won a second senior All-Ireland medal on 4 September 2016. He scored 13 points for Tipperary from full forward on the day and received the Man of the Match Award. His displays in 2016 won him his third consecutive GAA/GPA All Star Award. Liam Ryan was also a member of the extended panel.

In August 2019, Séamus Callanan captained Tipperary Senior hurlers to the All Ireland Championship. This was Callanan's third All Ireland medal and first as captain. Callanan was the first Tipperary captain from Drom & Inch. Callanan also received his fourth GAA/GPA All Star Award and Hurler of the Year. Jamie Moloney was a member of the Tipperary extended panel in 2019.
