= William Tassie =

British jeweler

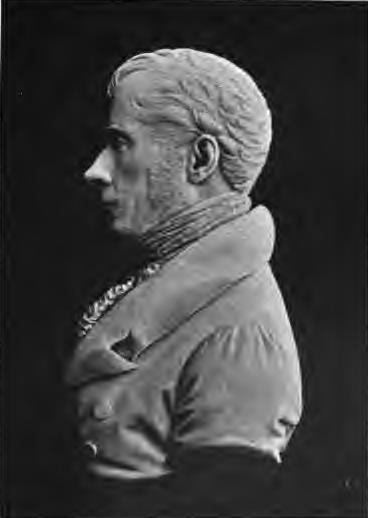
William Tassie depicted in about 1833 in an image reduced from a wax medallion, probably by Jacob Hagbolt

William Tassie (1777 – 26 October 1860) was a British gem engraver and cameo modeller of Scottish descent, who worked in London in the early 19th century. He took over the business of his uncle, James Tassie, after James's death in 1799. He added largely to his uncle's collection of casts and medallions. His portrait of Pitt, in particular, was very popular, and circulated widely.

On 28 January 1805, Tassie won the Boydell Shakespeare Gallery and its painting collection in a lottery held to pay off the debts of its owner, John Boydell. Tassie's three-guinea ticket won the top prize among the 22,000 sold. Boydell had died just before the drawing. His nephew Josiah Boydell offered to buy the gallery and its paintings back from Tassie for £10,000, but Tassie refused and auctioned the paintings at Christie's. The painting collection and two reliefs by Anne Damer fetched a total of £6,181 18s. 6d.

Tassie died in 1860 and is buried in Brompton Cemetery, London. He bequeathed to the Board of Manufactures, Edinburgh, an extensive and valuable collection of casts and medallions by his uncle and himself, along with portraits of James Tassie and his wife by the painter David Allan, and a series of watercolour studies by George Sanders from pictures of the Dutch and Flemish schools.

== Bibliography ==
- Friedman, Winifred H. Boydell's Shakespeare Gallery. New York: Garland Publishing Inc., 1976. ISBN 0-8240-1987-3.
- Gray, John Miller. James and William Tassie: A Biographical and Critical Sketch, with a Catalog of Their Portraits. Edinburgh: Walter Greenoak Patterson, 1894.
- Merchant, W. Moelwyn. Shakespeare and the Artist. London: Oxford University Press, 1959.
