= James Tassie =

Scottish jeweler and modeller (1735–1799)

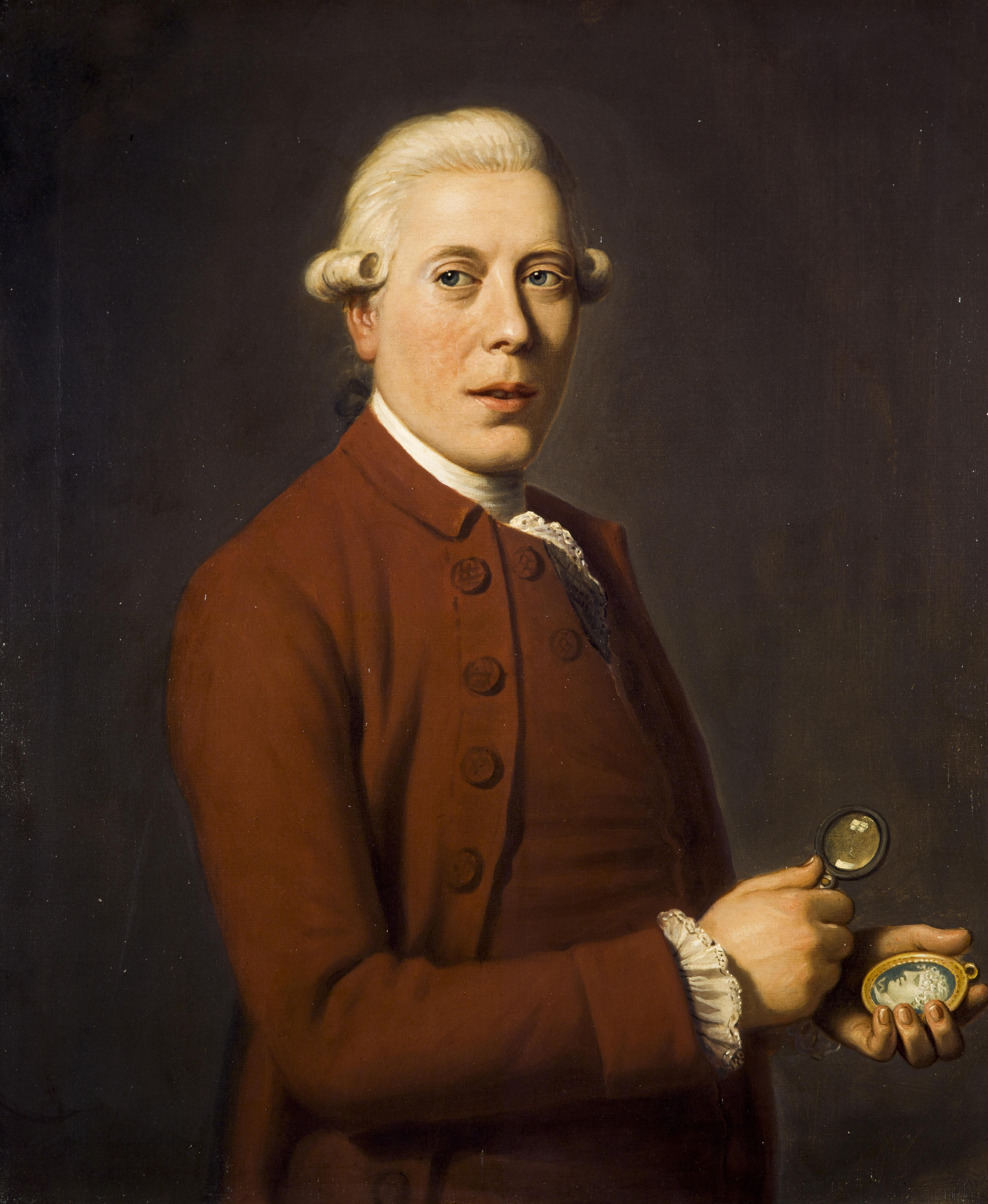
c. 1781 portrait of Tassie by David Allan

James Tassie (15 July 1735 – 1799) was a Scottish jeweller and modeller. He is remembered for a particular style of miniature medallion heads, portraying the profiles of the rich and famous of Britain, and for making and selling large numbers of "Tassie casts" of ancient engraved gems for collectors.

== Life ==
James Tassie was born on 15 July 1735 in Pollokshaws, Glasgow. During his earlier years he worked as a stonemason, but, having seen the collection of paintings brought together in Glasgow by Robert Foulis and Andrew Foulis, the printers, he removed to Glasgow, attended the academy which had been established there by the brothers Foulis, and became one of the most distinguished pupils of the school.

Subsequently, he visited Dublin in search of commissions, and there became acquainted with Henry Quin, who had been experimenting, as an amateur, in imitating antique engraved gems in coloured pastes. He engaged Tassie as an assistant, and together they perfected the discovery of an enamel, admirably adapted by its hardness and beauty of texture for the formation of gems and medallions. Quin encouraged his assistant to try his fortune in London, and he moved there in 1766. At first he had a hard struggle to make his way. But he worked on steadily with the greatest care and accuracy, scrupulously destroying all impressions of his gems which were in the slightest degree inferior or defective.

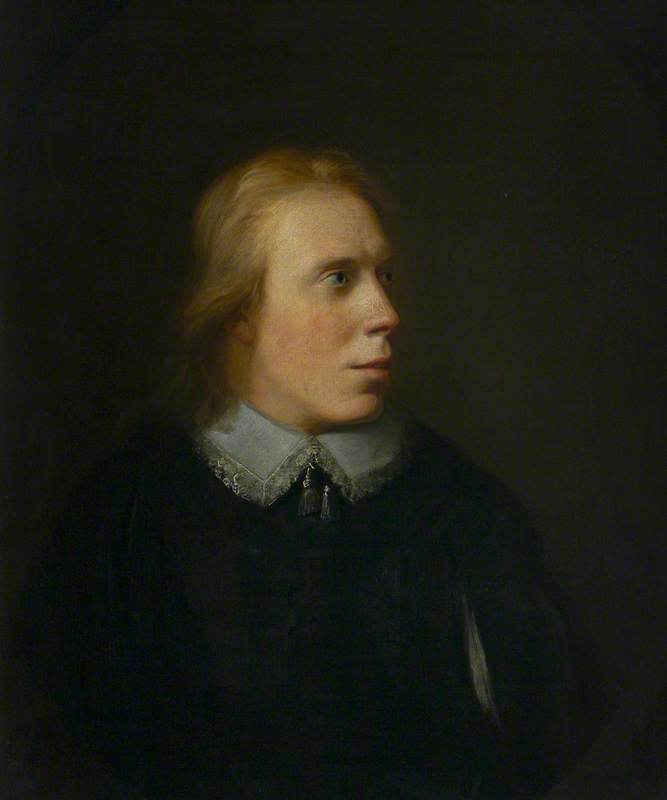
Portrait of Tassie, by John Paxton

Gradually the beauty and artistic character of his productions came to be known. He received a commission from Catherine the Great, Empress of Russia, for a collection of about 15,000 examples; all the richest cabinets in Europe were thrown open to him for purposes of study and reproduction; and his copies were frequently sold by fraudulent dealers as the original gems. He exhibited in the Royal Academy from 1769 to 1791. In 1775, he published the first catalogue of his works, a thin pamphlet detailing 2856 items. This was followed in 1791 by a large catalogue, in two volumes quarto, with illustrations etched by David Allan, and descriptive text in English and French by Rudolf Erich Raspe, listing nearly 16,000 pieces.

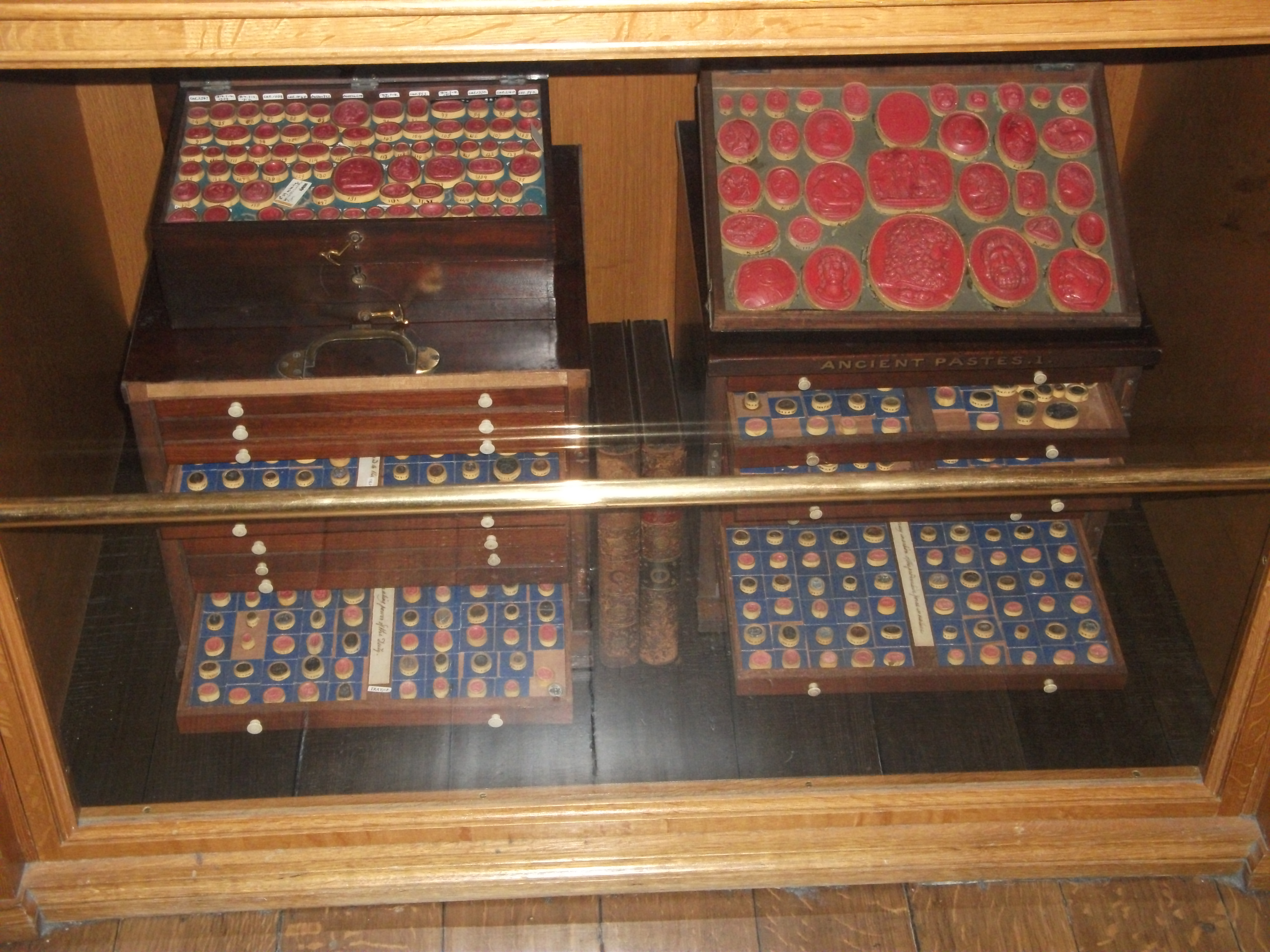
Collector's cabinets of casts from gems in the British Museum

This handwritten catalogue, titled "A Descriptive Catalogue of a General Collection of Ancient and Modern Engraved Gems, Cameos and Intaglios, Taken from the Most Celebrated Cabinets in Europe; and Cast in Coloured Pastes, White Enamel, and Sulphur" is widely accessible. However, the complete collection of impressions gems are known only at Tassie's home in Edinburgh, Victoria and Albert Museum in London and the Hermitage Museum in St. Petersburg. Tassie sent the gems impressions that produced for Catherine the Great, in four deliveries between 1781 and 1781.

In addition to his impressions from antique gems, Tassie executed many large profile medallion portraits of his contemporaries, and these form the most original and definitely artistic class of his works. They were modelled in wax from the life or from drawings done from the life, and when this was impossible from other authentic sources. They were then cast in white enamel paste, the whole medallion being sometimes executed in this material; while in other cases the head only appears in enamel, relieved against a background of ground-glass tinted of a subdued color by paper placed behind.

His first large enamel portrait was that of John Dolbon, son of Sir William Dolben, 3rd Baronet, modelled in 1793 or 1794; and the series possesses great historic interest, as well as artistic value, including as it does portraits of Adam Smith, Sir Henry Raeburn, Drs James Beattie, Hugh Blair, Black and Cullen, and many other celebrated men of the latter half of the 18th century.

At the time of his death, in 1799, the collection of Tassie's works numbered about 20,000 pieces.

His nephew William Tassie followed him in the business.

== Legacy ==
In the 1830s, Tassie's pieces continued to be sold, and H. Laing, engraver and manufacturer of James Tassie's composition seals was selling licensed copies of Tassie's work from a shop at 32 Princes Street in the centre of Edinburgh. Moreover, during the 19th century, Andrew Dickson White, the first president of the Cornell University bought and offered to the University an extensive Tassie's daktyliotheca, purchased from a German manufacturer called Gustav Eichler (1801–77).

In 2008, a bar in the Shawlands area of Glasgow was renamed "The James Tassie" in his honour. This bar is affectionately known to regular patrons as "The Tassies".

== Gallery ==
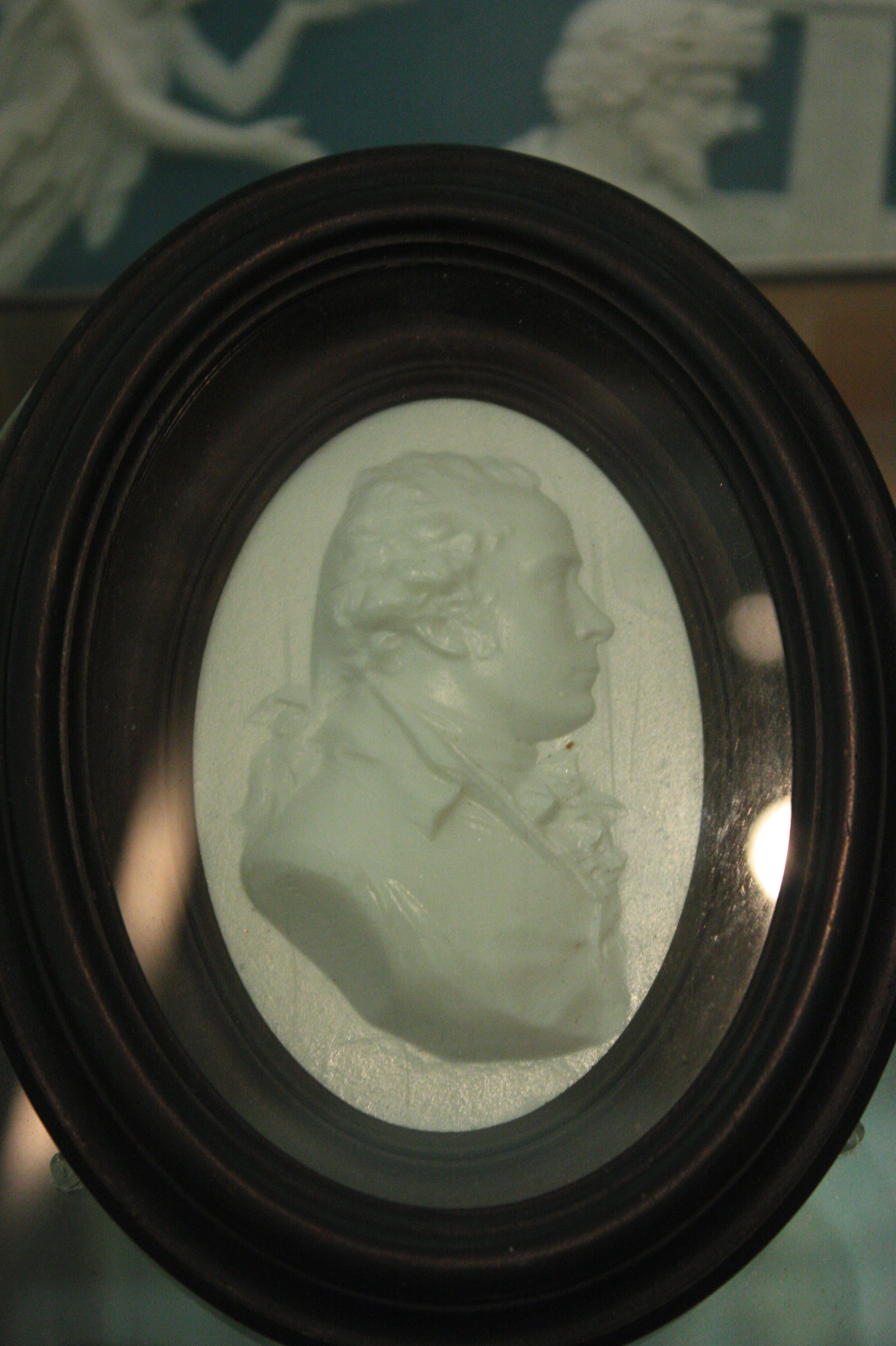
Cameo medallion of James Tassie by William Tassie in the style invented by Tassie

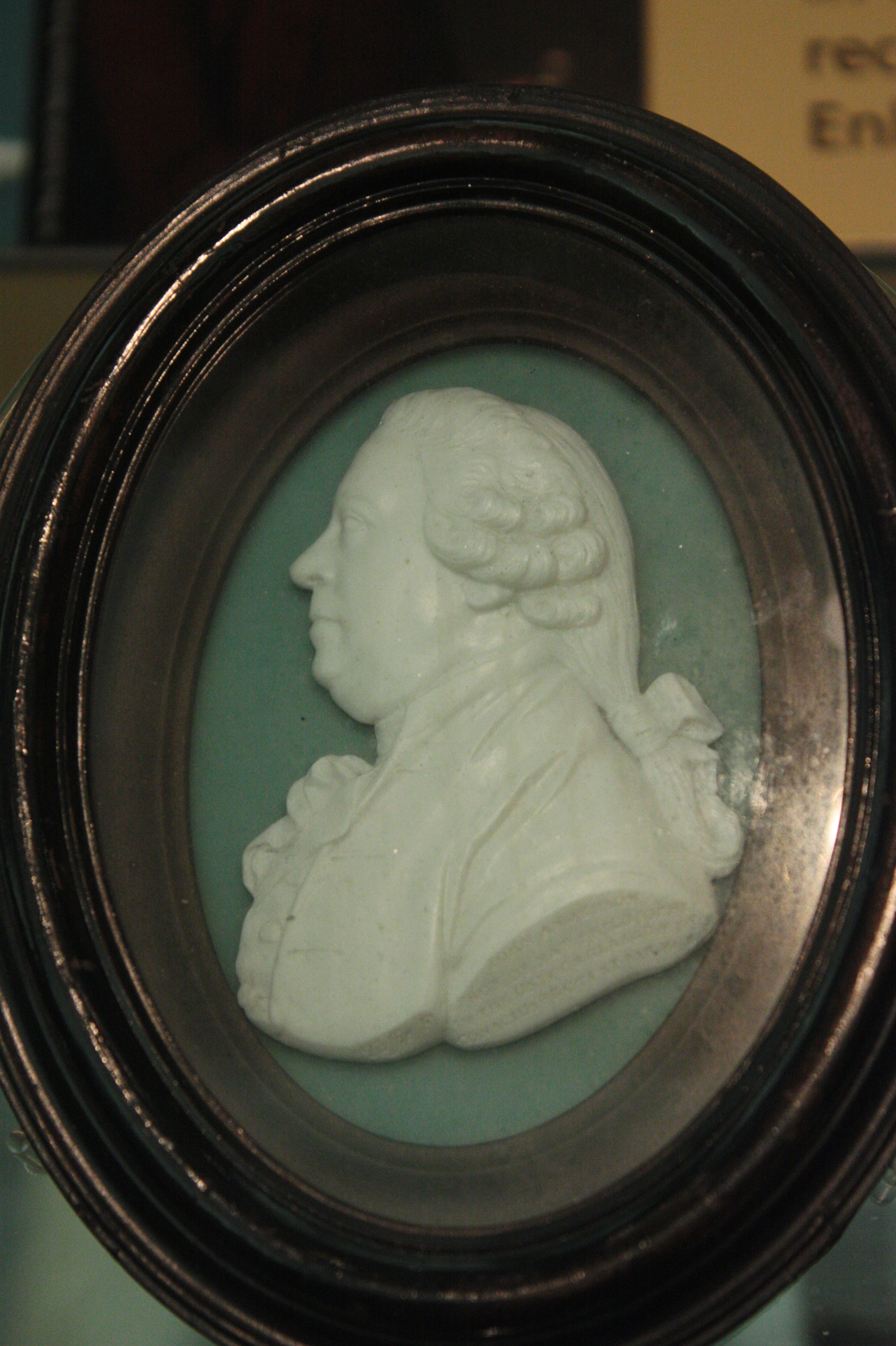
Henry Raeburn by James Tassie, a typical Tassie medallion

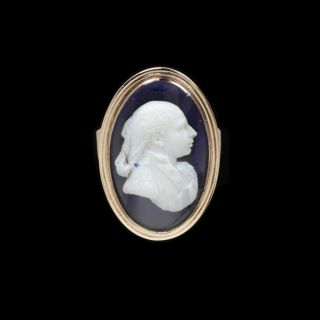
Cameo ring, 1788, by James Tassie. V&A Museum no. M.93-1969

== Bibliography ==
- Gray, John Miller. James and William Tassie: A Biographical and Critical Sketch, with a Catalog of Their Portraits. Edinburgh: Walter Greenoak Patterson, 1894.
- Graeplar, Daniel (2010). Frederiksen, Rune; Marchand, Eckhart (eds.). Plaster Casts: Making, Collecting and Displaying from Classical Antiquity to the Present. Berlin: De Gruyter. ISBN 9783110216875..
- Raspe, Rudolf Erich (1791). A descriptive catalogue of a general collection of ancient and modern engraved gems, cameos as well as intaglios. London: J. Tassie and J. Murray. OL 14003542M.
