= Merrion Hotel =

Hotel in Dublin, Ireland

The Merrion Hotel
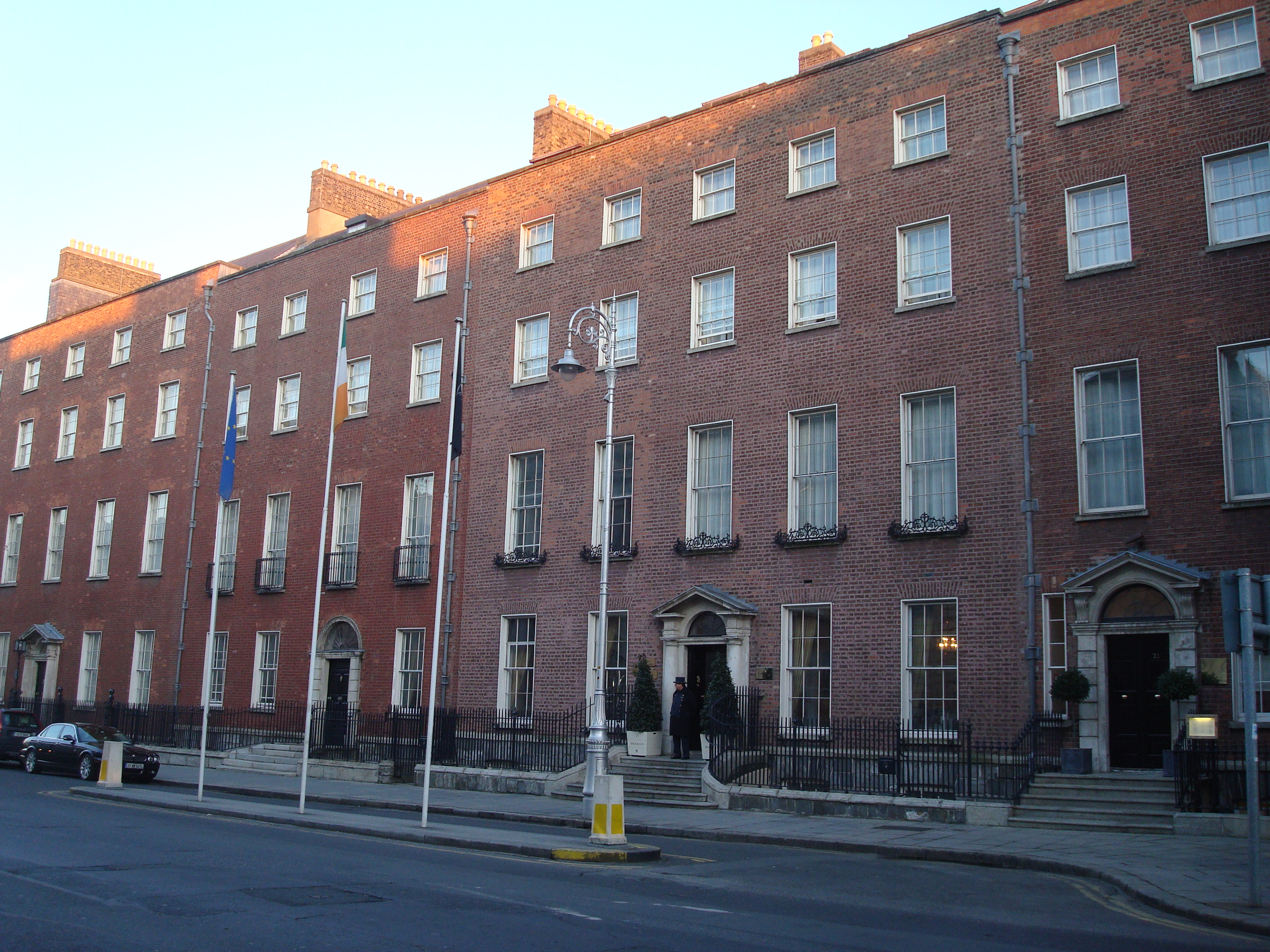
- The Merrion Hotel

- Location within Central Dublin

General information
- Status: Open
- Type: Hotel
- Architectural style: Georgian
- Classification: 5 stars
- Location: 21-23 Merrion St Upper, Dublin 2, Dublin, Ireland
- Coordinates: 53.33854°N 6.25286°W
- Estimated completion: 1750-1770
- Opened: 1997 (Hotel)
- Owner: Martin Naughton and Lochlann Quinn (50%); Hastings Hotels group (50%)

Technical details
- Floor count: 5

Design and construction
- Developer: Charles Monck, 1st Viscount Monck

Website
- merrionhotel.com

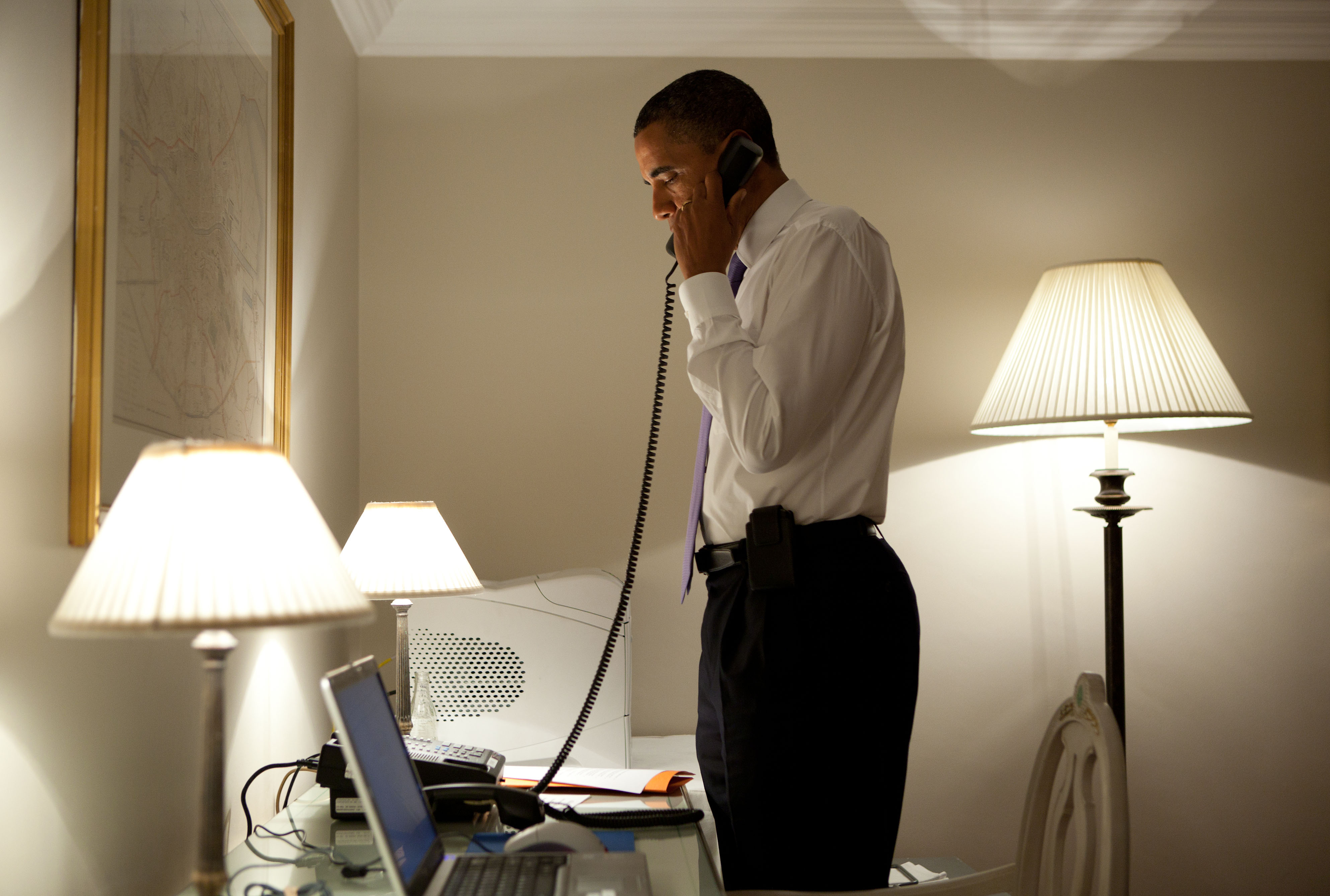
Barack Obama at the hotel in 2011.

The Merrion Hotel is a 5-star hotel on Merrion Street in Dublin, Ireland which is located opposite Government Buildings and encompasses Mornington House.

== History ==
The hotel first opened in 1997 and encompasses a block of four Georgian terraced houses on Upper Merrion Street, built in the 1760s by Charles Monck, 1st Viscount Monck, for wealthy Irish merchants and nobility. He lived in Number 22, which became known as Monck House. The first of these Georgian houses (Number 24), Mornington House, is the reputed birthplace of Arthur Wellesley, 1st Duke of Wellington.

The business is 50% owned by family members of Lochlann Quinn and Martin Naughton with the remaining 50% owned by the Hastings Hotel Group.

The hotel also incorporates, as a separate business, a 2-star Michelin restaurant, Restaurant Patrick Guilbaud.

As of 2023, the hotel contained 123 rooms and 19 suites.

== See also ==
- Georgian Dublin
