= Mornington House =

Georgian house in Dublin, Ireland

Coordinates: 53.338723°N 6.252645°W

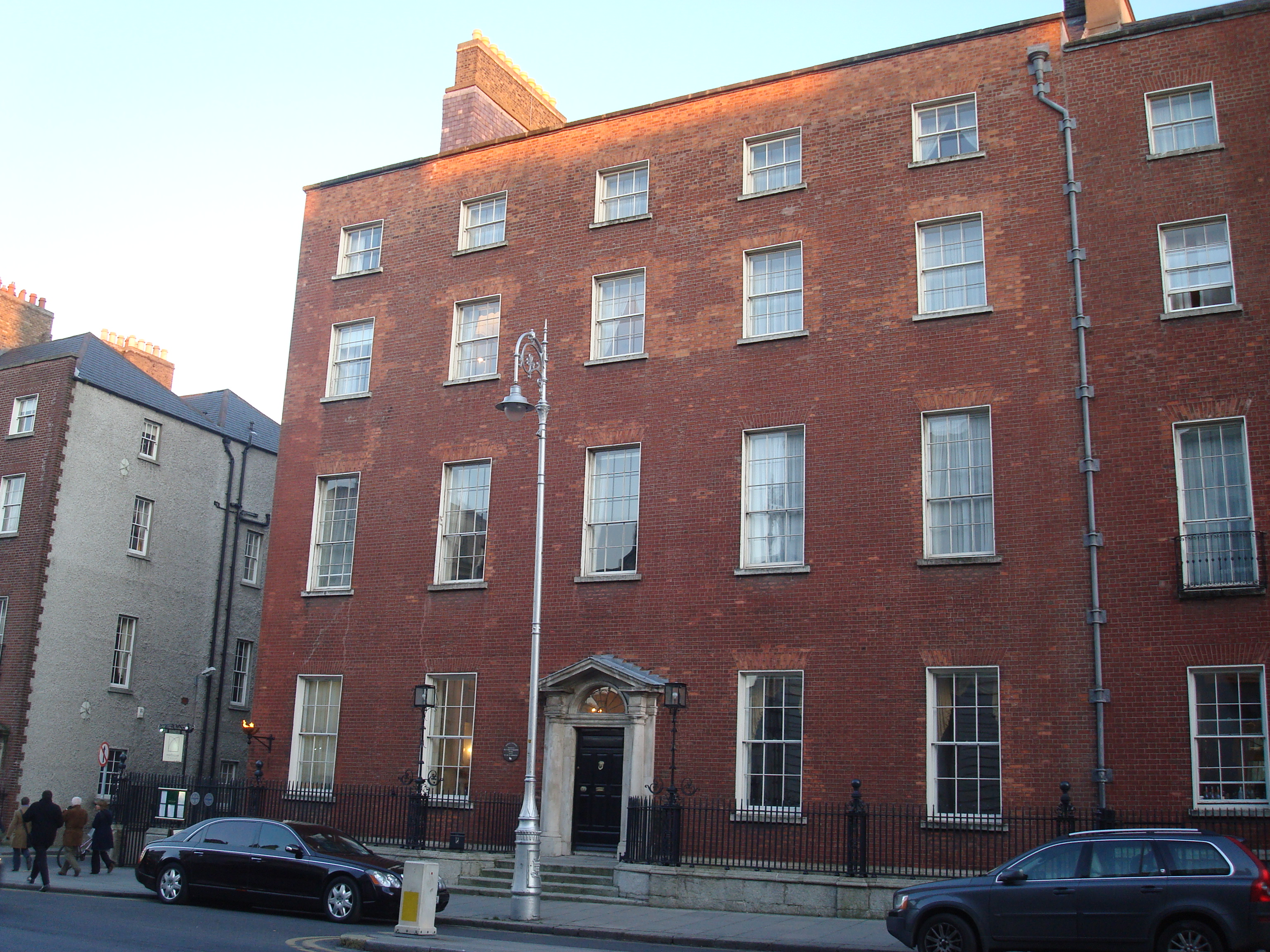
Mornington House

Mornington House was the Dublin social season Georgian residence of the Earls of Mornington at 24 Merrion Street, close to Leinster House.

Arthur Wellesley, the fourth son of Garret Wesley, 1st Earl of Mornington, later a Field Marshal (1813), then 1st Duke of Wellington (1814) and British prime minister, is said to have been born there, though other sources suggest he was born in the family's country seat, Dangan Castle, near Summerhill, County Meath. His mother gave 1 May as his birthday, and he himself so kept it, but the nurse affirmed that he was born on 6 March at Dangan Castle, Co. Meath. The registry of St. Peter's Church, Aungier Street, Dublin, shows that he was christened there on 30 April 1769, and the May number of Exshaw's Gentleman's Magazine has "April 29. The Countess of Mornington of a son." The Dublin Gazette of 2–4 May dates the event "a few days ago, in Merrion Street".

The house was later sold and for most of the twentieth century was the headquarters of the Irish Land Commission. For some years it was considered as a possible residence for the Taoiseach (Prime Minister) of Ireland. It was, however, sold in the 1990s and is now a popular international hotel. The Merrion Hotel comprises a block of four houses in a terrace on Upper Merrion Street, of which Mornington House is the leftmost when viewed from the front. The houses were built in the 1760s by Charles Monck, 1st Viscount Monck for wealthy Irish merchants and nobility. He lived in No. 22, which became known as Monck House. The hotel also incorporates, as a separate business, Dublin's only 2-star Michelin restaurant, Restaurant Patrick Guilbaud.

The four houses forming the main house of the hotel are typical of domestic Georgian architecture in Ireland. The plain exteriors rely for effect on the carefully worked out classical proportions of the timber sash windows and their relation to the whole façade. The doorcases, with their varied treatment and intricate fanlights, were where the builder could impose some individuality on the building. In most other areas, the normal lease laid down strict requirements.

Internally, there were no such restrictions. This explains the wealth of varied plasterwork and woodwork contained in the houses. The architectural detail of the houses clearly indicates the progression of their construction. No. 21 has intricate rococo plasterwork and a particularly heavy staircase. The detail lightens as one progresses along the terrace, although No. 22, the first to be built, is an exception. Here the main stair hall and the principal reception rooms have much lighter detailing, in the neo-classical, Adam style. In the midst of this lighter decoration, there are examples of heavier detail, such as the intricate Corinthian cornice in the stairwell and the third floor room with coved ceilings and dramatic rococo plasterwork. Monck House was "modernised" in the late 18th century or the beginning of the 19th century.
