= Viscount Monck =

Title in the peerage of Ireland

Viscountcy Monck
- Blazon Arms: Gules, a chevron between three lions' heads erased argent. Crest: A dragon passant, wings addorsed, sable. Supporters: Dexter, a dragon, wings addorsed argent langued gules holding over the dexter shoulder a laurel branch fructed proper; Sinister, a lion argent, langued gules, holding over the sinister shoulder a laurel branch fructed proper.
- Creation date: 5 January 1801
- Created by: King George III
- Peerage: Peerage of Ireland
- First holder: Charles Stanley Monck
- Present holder: Charles Stanley Monck, 7th Viscount
- Heir presumptive: Hon. George Stanley Monck
- Remainder to: The 1st Viscount's heirs male of the body lawfully begotten
- Subsidiary titles: Baron Monck
- Status: Extant
- Motto: Fortiter, fideliter, feliciter. (Boldly, faithfully, happily).

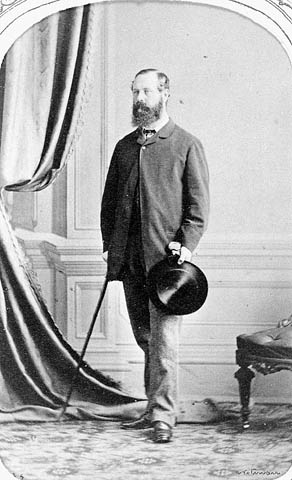
Charles Monck, 4th Viscount Monck

Viscount Monck, of Ballytrammon in the County of Wexford, is a title in the Peerage of Ireland. It was created in 1801 for Charles Monck, 1st Baron Monck. He had already been created Baron Monck, of Ballytrammon in the County of Wexford, in 1797, also in the Peerage of Ireland. His eldest son, the second Viscount, was in 1822 created Earl of Rathdowne in the Peerage of Ireland. However, this title became extinct on his death, while he was succeeded in the other titles by his younger brother, the third Viscount. The latter's son, the fourth Viscount, served as the 1st Governor General of Canada. In 1866, he was given the title Baron Monck, of Ballytrammon in the County of Wexford, in the Peerage of the United Kingdom. This title gave the viscounts a seat in the Westminster House of Lords until the passing of the House of Lords Act 1999. As of 2012 the titles are held by his great-great-grandson, the seventh Viscount, who succeeded his father in 1982. He does not use his titles.

== Barons Monck (1797) ==
- Charles Stanley Monck, 1st Baron Monck (c. 1754–1802) (created Viscount Monck in 1801)

== Viscounts Monck (1801) ==
- Charles Stanley Monck, 1st Viscount Monck (c. 1754–1802)
- Henry Stanley Monck, 2nd Viscount Monck (1785–1848) (created Earl of Rathdowne in 1822)

== Earls of Rathdowne (1822) ==
- Henry Stanley Monck, 1st Earl of Rathdowne (1785–1848)

== Viscounts Monck (1801; reverted) ==
- Charles Joseph Kelly Monck, 3rd Viscount Monck (1791–1849), brother of the 2nd Viscount
- Charles Stanley Monck, 4th Viscount Monck (1819–1894)
- Henry Power Charles Stanley Monck, 5th Viscount Monck (1849–1927)
  - Hon Charles Henry Stanley Monck (1876-1914)
- Henry Wyndham Stanley Monck, 6th Viscount Monck (1905–1982), grandson of the 5th Viscount
- Charles Stanley Monck, 7th Viscount Monck (born 1953)

The heir presumptive is the present holder's brother, the Hon. George Stanley Monck (born 1957)

The next and last in line to the titles is the present holder's youngest brother, the Hon. James Stanley Monck (born 1961).
