= Henry Monck, 1st Earl of Rathdowne =

Henry Stanley Monck, 1st Earl of Rathdowne and 2nd Viscount Monck (26 July 1785 – 20 September 1848), was the son of Charles Monck, 1st Viscount Monck, and Anne Quin. On 28 July 1806, he married Lady Frances Mary Trench, daughter of William Trench, 1st Earl of Clancarty, and his wife Anne, Countess of Clancarty (née Gardiner). They had 11 daughters.

- Lady Anne Florinda Monck (died 1876) married William Mulveney
- Lady Elizabeth Louise Mary Monck (died 16 June 1892), married her first cousin Charles Monck, 4th Viscount Monck
- Lady Emily Monck (died 22 November 1837), married William Barlow Smyth
- Lady Frances Isabella Monck (died 9 June 1871), married Owen Blayney Cole
- Lady Georgiana Ellen Monck (died 20 March 1887), married Edward Croker

As he died without male heirs, the earldom became extinct and the viscountcy was inherited by his brother Charles.

Peerage of Ireland
New creation	Earl of Rathdowne; 1822–1848	Extinct
Preceded by Charles Monck	Viscount Monck; 1802–1848	Succeeded by Charles Monck
