= John Paxton (painter) =

Scottish painter

- Died: 1780; Bombay, India
- Occupation: Painter

John Paxton (died 1780) was a Scottish painter.

== Biography ==
Paxton appears to have been of Scottish origin, and to have been a student in Foulis's art academy at Glasgow. He subsequently studied at Rome. He was one of the original members of the Incorporated Society of Artists, and signed their declaration roll in 1766. In that year he sent to their exhibition from Rome ‘Samson in Distress.’ In 1769 and 1770 he exhibited portraits at the Royal Academy, and in the latter year settled in Charlotte Street, Rathbone Place, where he had considerable practice as a portrait-painter. He continued to exhibit with the Society of Artists, of which he was director in 1775, sending chiefly portraits, but also scriptural, classical, and historical subjects. Subsequently, he received some commissions to paint portraits in India, and went there about 1776. He died at Bombay in 1780. Paxton painted a portrait of Signorina Zamperini as ‘Cechina.’ A portrait by him of his fellow-pupil, James Tassie, is in the Scottish National Portrait Gallery at Edinburgh. Paxton is alluded to in John Langhorne's ‘Fables of Flora,’ 1771.
