= Johnny Ryan (hurler, born 1988) =

Irish hurler

Personal information
- Native name: Seán Ó Riain (Irish)
- Born: 5 September 1988 (age 38) Nenagh, County Tipperary

Sport
- Sport: Hurling
- Position: Midfield
Club
- Years: Club
- 2005-: Drom & Inch
Club titles
- Tipperary titles: 1
Inter-county
- Years: County
- 2012-: Tipperary
Inter-county titles
- Munster titles: 1

Johnny Ryan (born 5 September 1988), is an Irish sportsperson. He plays hurling with his local club Drom & Inch and has been a member of the Tipperary senior inter-county hurling team since 2012.

== Career ==
In 2006 Ryan won an All-Ireland Minor Hurling medal with Tipperary playing in goals. In 2009 Johnny won a Munster Under-21 Hurling Championship for Tipperary. In 2011 Johnny was Man of the Match in Drom & Inch's first ever county final win playing at midfield.

On 11 March 2012, Ryan made his senior Tipperary debut against Galway in the 2012 National Hurling League, coming on as a substitute and scoring a point in a 2-20 a 2–18 win.

== Honours ==
=== Tipperary ===
- All-Ireland Minor Hurling Championship:
  - Winner (1): 2006
- Munster Minor Hurling Championship:
  - Winner (0):
  - Runner-up (1): 2006
- Munster Under-21 Hurling Championship:
  - Winner (1):
- Waterford Crystal Cup:
  - Winner (1): 2012
- Munster Senior Hurling Championship:
  - Winner (1):

=== Drom & Inch ===
- Tipperary Senior Hurling Championship:
  - Winner (1): 2011
