= Lochlann Quinn =

Irish businessman and philanthropist

Lochlann Quinn (born 1940) is an Irish businessman and philanthropist.

== Education ==
Quinn attended Blackrock College, and graduated from University College Dublin (BComm) in 1962. He qualified as a Chartered Accountant in 1966. He is main benefactor of the UCD Quinn School of Business. On Friday, April 24, 2009, the President of Ireland, Mary McAleese, presented the UCD Ulysses Medal, the highest honour that the university can bestow, to Quinn and Sir Michael Smurfit.

== Career ==
Quinn joined Arthur Andersen & Co. in London and, in 1969, he returned to Dublin to head up their audit practice in Ireland until 1980. In 1980, he joined Glen Dimplex – a small, privately owned Irish company – as deputy chairman and finance director. The company now has annual sales of $1.3 billion and employs 8,000 people in Europe and Canada. Quinn was one of two shareholders but in 2004 sold his interest back to Martin Naughton. Quinn is also a former director of AIB Bank (1995–96), former chairman of Allied Irish Banks Group, and half-owner of The Merrion Hotel.

=== AIB ===
Following the fraudulent trading activities at AIB's American subsidiary - AllFirst - both Quinn and the Chief Executive, Michael Buckley, offered their resignations to the board of AIB on Tuesday, March 12, 2002, but were asked to stay on by the board.

== Private business interests ==
Quinn's business interests include the Merrion Hotel in Dublin; commercial properties in Dublin, London and Brussels; and a vineyard in Bordeaux (Château de Fieuzal).

Since January 22, 2008, he has been the chairman of the Electricity Supply Board (ESB).

In 1991, it was reported that Quinn was a shareholder in a company called United Property Holdings, one of the firms at the center of the Johnston Mooney & O'Brien scandal. The company made a £2 million profit on the first deal involving the site in Ballsbridge, Dublin. Other shareholders included Dermot Desmond, Smurfit Paribas Investment Management, Glen Dimplex founder Martin Naughton and horse breeder John Magnier. Joe Lewis was also reported to be a shareholder.

== Voluntary roles ==
Quinn is a major benefactor to, and former chairman of, the National Gallery of Ireland. He was also chairman (1997–2003) of the Irish Museum of Modern Art (1990–2000). He is a member of the Irish Advisory Board of the UCD Michael Smurfit Graduate School of Business.

== Personal life ==
Quinn is married to Brenda, and they have six children. He is a brother of Ruairi Quinn, and first cousin of Feargal Quinn. His son Oisín Quinn is a former councillor on Dublin City Council and former Lord Mayor of Dublin.
