= William Mossop =

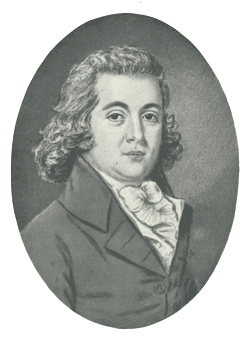
- Born: 1755; Dublin
- Died: 28 January 1805 (aged 49–50); Dublin
- Known for: Sculpture and engraving
- Movement: Classicism

William Mossop (1751—1805) was an Irish medallist and founder of the art in Ireland.

== Life ==
William Mossop was born in St. Mary's parish in Dublin to a Roman Catholic father named Browne. His mother later married a man named William Mossop. The Mossops were Protestant, and in order to obtain a place for her son in the Bluecoat School, which accepted only Protestants, his mother changed his surname to Mossop. He attended school until he was 14, at which point he began an apprenticeship.

Following his apprenticeship with John Stone, he opened his own business at Bull Lane. He cut dies, crests and coats of arm, wine and office seals, and other devices. His first recorded medal, for John Beresford, was struck in 1782. In 1783, he executed a medal bearing a portrait of Dr. Henry Quin, which was presented to the doctor by Robert Watson Wade, First Clerk of the Irish Treasury, as a token of gratitude for his recovery from a severe illness. With the help of a man named Quin, who had artistic interests, Mossop obtained commissions for several portrait medals. One of these was for Lord Pery, the Speaker of the House of Commons. In 1786, Mossop was employed to make the prize medal of the Royal Irish Academy, considered one of his best works. The medal bears on the obverse a portrait of Lord Charlemont in the uniform of the Irish Volunteers, and on the reverse Hibernia seated on a pile of books, surrounded by the emblems of Astronomy, Chemistry, Poetry and Antiquities. Another fine medal was that of Primate Robinson, to commemorate the erection of the Armagh Observatory, done in 1789. In 1788, the death of Dr. Quin deprived Mossop of a friend and benefactor. His gratitude was expressed by an inscription on the reverse of the medal to Quin, which he had executed in 1783: "Sacred to the Man who, after finding out the Author in obscurity, led him into the profession of this polite art and became his patron, his friend and liberal benefactor."

Mossop struck a number of medals for notable people in Dublin, the finest being for James Caulfeild, 1st Earl of Charlemont. He also struck medals for the Royal Dublin Society. According to historian Sir John Gilbert: "Although the medallic works of Mossop are not numerous, they are interesting as the first works of the kind produced in Ireland, and a lasting evidence of his natural ability in this department of art."

He died on 28 January 1805 at his home in Dublin due to paralysis. He was buried at St. Andrew's Church, and his son, William Stephen Mossop, took over the family's medallist business.
