= Henry Quin =

Irish physician (1718–1791)

- Born: 1718
- Died: 11 February 1791 (aged 72–73)
- Occupation: Physician

Henry Quin M.D. (1718 – 11 February 1791) was an Irish physician in Dublin, Ireland.

== Life ==
Quin was born in Dublin, the son of Thomas Quin, apothecary and Master of the Guild of St. Luke. He studied medicine at Trinity College, Dublin, where he graduated in 1743. He then travelled on the continent for six years, during which he obtained a doctorate of the University of Padua. Shortly after his return, having passed the required examination, in September 1749 he was elected King's professor of the practice of physic at the medical school of Trinity College. He was later Fellow and seven times President of the King and Queen's College of Physicians in Ireland.

He built up a large and lucrative practice in Dublin, but also devoted himself to the arts and to the support of artists in the city. These included the Scottish engraver James Tassie and Dublin medallist William Mossop.

He died at his home on St. Stephen's Green, Dublin.

== Family ==
Quin married Ann Monck (d. 4 November 1788) in the 1750s. His daughter Anne married Charles Monck, 1st Viscount Monck. His son Charles William followed in his father's footsteps and became President of the College of Physicians in 1789. His other son, Henry George (1760–1805), was a noted book collector; he traveled widely on the continent and bought at auctions there as well as in Ireland and England. Although by all accounts in good spirits, and financially well off, he shot himself in the heart with a pistol as he lay in bed in Dublin on 16 February 1805.
