= Tommy Butler (hurler) =

Irish hurler (1951–2020)

Personal information
- Native name: Tomás de Buitléir (Irish)
- Born: 1951 Bouladuff, County Tipperary, Ireland
- Died: 12 November 2020 (aged 69) Bouladuff, County Tipperary, Ireland
- Occupation: Creamery employee

Sport
- Sport: Hurling
- Position: Left corner-forward
Club
- Years: Club
- Drom & Inch
Club titles
- Tipperary titles: 0
Inter-county
Years	County	Apps (scores)
1974-1980	Tipperary	8 (2-12)
Inter-county titles
- Munster titles: 0
- All-Irelands: 0
- NHL: 1
- All Stars: 1

Thomas Butler (1951 - 12 November 2020) was an Irish hurler. At club level he played with Drom & Inch and was also a member of the Tipperary senior hurling team. He usually lined out as a forward.

== Career ==
Butler first came to prominence at juvenile and underage levels with the Drom & Inch club, as well as lining out with Templemore CBS. He made his senior debut at club level as a 15-year-old in 1966 and won two Mid Tipperary Championship titles in a career that spanned four decades. Butler first appeared on the inter-county scene with the Tipperary under-21 team, having earlier failed to make the minor team. His three years in the under-21 grade yielded a Munster Under-21 Championship title in 1972. Butler was later drafted onto the Tipperary senior hurling team and made his debut against Limerick in the last game of the 1973-74 league. His senior career coincided with a barren spell for Tipperary in terms of success, however, he won a National Hurling League medal in 1979, having claimed an All-Star the previous year. Butler also wona Railway Cup medal with Munster in 1978.

== Honours ==
=== Team ===
Drom & Inch

- Mid Tipperary Senior Hurling Championship: 1974, 1984

Tipperary

- National Hurling League: 1978-79
- Munster Under-21 Hurling Championship: 1972

Munster

- Railway Cup: 1978

=== Individual ===
Awards

- All-Star Award: 1978
- RTÉ Goal of the Year: 1979
