= Barnane =

Barnane Irish: An Bearnán
- Townland
- Barnane shown within Ireland
- Coordinates: 52°48′10″N 7°54′33″W
- Country: Ireland
- County: County Tipperary
- Barony: Ikerrin
- Civil parish: Barnane-Ely

Barnane (Irish: An Bearnán) is a townland in the civil parish of the same name in County Tipperary, Ireland. Barnane or Barnane-Ely is one of eleven civil parishes in the historical barony of Ikerrin. It is also part of the Ecclesiastical parish of Drom and Inch.

== Location ==
It lies in the shelter of the southern slope of the Devil's Bit mountain. The R501 road nearby connects the village to the towns of Borrisoleigh to the west and Templemore to the east.

== Legend ==
The townland gets its name from the legend of Saint Patrick who was pursuing the Devil out of Ireland. In his haste to escape the Apostle of Ireland, the Devil took a bite out of the mountain. The resultant gap (Irish: Bearnán) is what we see today in an otherwise smooth, table-like mountain. Spitting it out again, the "bit" landed in South Tipperary and formed the Rock of Cashel.

== Barnane National School ==
The Old School in Barnane (1846–1958)

In 1846 two national schools were founded in Barnane under the National Board System. Both National Schools were located in the one building. The school was a non-domination school and records show that no religious figures, from any Church, were authorised to come in to give religious instruction.

The New School in Barnane (1958–present)

Barnane National School was built in 1958 by Bertie Keane. To date four Principal teachers have worked in the school. Mrs. Mary White was principal of Barnane old School (1951–1959) and principal of Barnane New School (1959–1988), Mr. Martin Ryan was principal of Barnane N.S. 1988–2004, Mrs. Clare Hanley principal from 2004 to 2020. The current principal is Ms. Therese Glendon (2020–present).

== Facilities and places of interest ==
There is a three teacher primary school. It is in the catchment area for Drom-Inch GAA club.

A large country house, Barnane House, once stood in the parish, but little now remains since the house was abandoned by its owner Andrew Carden, circa 1920.

== See also ==
- List of towns and villages in Ireland
- List of civil parishes of County Tipperary
- Carden baronets
