= Charles Monck, 1st Viscount Monck =

Charles Stanley Monck, 1st Viscount Monck, was born in 1754 and died on 9 June 1802. He was the 1st son of Thomas Monck MP, by his wife, Judith Mason, daughter of Robert Mason, of Mason Brook.

He was MP for Gorey from 1790 to 1798. He gained the title of 1st Viscount Monck in 1801 as a reward for voting for the Act of Union (1800). He had already been created Baron Monck, of Ballytrammon in the County of Wexford, in 1797, also in the Peerage of Ireland.

== Country seat ==
His country seat was Charleville House which overlooks a water meadow for the River Dargle, enjoying frontage onto the Killough River. The estate is located 3 km from the village of Enniskerry and 4 km from Powerscourt Waterfall. The Monck family became owners of the estate in 1705. That was the year Charles Monck (the grandfather of the 1st Viscount) married Angela Hitchcock, an heiress. A fire in 1792 destroyed the original building. The Viscount commissioned the present structure and had it designed by Whitmore Davis. Building was not completed until 1830, the unduly long time occasioned by the 1798 rebellion.

In 1797, the Viscount also built four identical lodges on the estate. He also built a terrace of houses in Upper Merrion Street, Dublin 2. Number 22 is known as "Monck House" while number 24 is known as Mornington House.

== Ancestors ==
Henry Monck of Iver, Buckinghamshire, admitted to Inner Temple in November 1579. He married Joan Hitchcock (died 10 October 1601). Their heir was

Charles Monck of St. Stephen’s Green was appointed the Surveyor-General of all customs in Ireland in 1627. He married Elizabeth Blennerhassett (died before 15 June 1647), the daughter of Sir John Blennerhassett, Chief Baron of the Irish Exchequer and his wife Ursula Duke. They had a daughter Elizabeth and a son,

- Henry Monck (born before 1626), who married Sarah Stanley on 1 May 1673. She was the daughter and heiress of Sir Thomas Stanley of Grangegorman. They had seven sons and three daughters. He was attainted by King James II of England but restored to his estates by King William III of England. They had issue:

- George Monck of St. Stephen’s Green (died 2 August 1726), married Mary Molesworth (died in 1715), the daughter of Robert Molesworth, 1st Viscount Molesworth and Letitia Coote. They had two daughters and one son. The eldest daughter,

- Sarah Monck, who died in 1739.
- Henry Stanley Monck of St. Stephen’s Green (the only son of George and Mary), who, like his great grandfather, was appointed the Surveyor-General of all customs. He died in 1745 having had two sons by Lady Sarah. His heir,

- George Paul Monck who married Lady Araminta Beresford, the sixth daughter of Marcus, the Earl of Tyrone by whom he had issue.

- Thomas Monck of St. Stephen’s Green
- Stanley Monck of St. Stephen’s Green
- Elizabeth Monck (baptised 11 June 1684 - died 20 February 1743) who married Joseph Kelly of Kellymount, Co. Kilkenny in June 1707.
- William Monck of the Middle Temple, London, who married Dorothy Bligh, daughter of Thomas Bligh of Rathmore, Co. Meath.
- Rebecca Monck who married John Forster, Chief Justice of the Irish Common Pleas (before 6 March 1707) and had three children, including Anne, who married George Berkeley, Bishop of Cloyne.
- Charles Monck of St. Stephen’s Green (who was the second son of Henry by Lady Sarah) (baptised 19 May 1678–1752) was called to the Irish bar. He married Agneta Hitchcock who was the daughter of Major Walter Hitchcock, on 23 October 1705. They had two sons, George and Thomas, as well as a daughter, Anne.

- George Monck of Charleville, County Wicklow, and of Grangegorman (died 16 December 1787) who married Lady Ann Isabella Bentinck on 8 November 1739. She was the daughter of Henry, 1st Duke of Portland. They had a son William Stanley who died aged 6 years. Their only surviving daughter and heir was

- Elizabeth (died 1815), who married George, Marquis of Waterford on 19 April 1769.

- Thomas Monck of Kildare Street, Dublin (died 1772), the second son of Charles. He married Judith Mason (died 14 October 1814), the daughter of Robert Mason of Mason-brook, County Galway on 15 October 1753.

- Charles Stanley Monck of Charleville, Co. Wicklow and of Grangegorman (born 1754, died 9 June 1802) who succeeded his uncle George in his estates. He was created Baron Monck of Ballytrammon, County Wexford, 23 November 1797, and Viscount Monck of Ballytrammon on 21 December 1800.
- Henry Stanley Monck, Lieutenant 13th Regiment of Foot.
- Anne Isabella, who married, as his third wife, Sir Cornwallis Maude, later Viscount Hawarden on 3 June 1777.
- Rev. Thomas Stanley Monck (born 1762 - died 4 March 1842).
- William Domville Monck (born in 1763 - died August 1840).

- Anne Monck (died 4 November 1788)(the daughter of Charles and Agneta), who married Henry Quin on 22 May 1750. They had issue

- Anne Quin, who married the 1st Viscount, her cousin.

Quoting from a history of north Dublin:

The northern end of Stonybatter received its present name of Manor Street in 1780 from the Manor of Grangegorman in which it was situated. The Manor House is now the police barrack in that street. The owner of the Manor in the reign of Charles II was Sir Thomas Stanley, from whom the short street called Stanley Street, off North Brunswick Street, is named. His daughter Sarah married in 1663 Henry Monck, grandfather of the first Lord Monck. To this family the estate passed, and their long association with the district is commemorated in such names as Monck Place, Royse Road, from the name of a family intermarried with the Moncks, Rathdown Road and Terrace, from the title of Earl of Rathdowne, enjoyed by one of the Viscounts Monck, and Charleville Road and Terrace and Enniskerry Road, from the name of their residence near Enniskerry, Co. Wicklow.

== Marriage and issue ==
He married in 1784 his cousin Anne Quin (or Quinn), the daughter of Henry Quin MD, of Dublin, by his wife Anne Monck, the first daughter of Charles Monck, of Grangegorman. Following her husband's death, Anne later married (before 1811) Sir John Craven Carden, 1st Baronet, as the baronet's fourth wife. Anne died 20 December 1823. The Viscount had issue:

- Anne Wilhelmina Monck
- Isabella Monck (died 1830)
- Henry Monck, 2nd Viscount Monck (born 26 July 1785, died 20 September 1848)
- Charles Monck, 3rd Viscount Monck (born 12 July 1791, died 20 April 1849)

Parliament of Ireland
Preceded by Stephen Ram; Richard Vowell	Member of Parliament for Gorey; 1790–1798; With: John Toler	Succeeded by John Toler; William Domville Stanley Monck
Peerage of Ireland
New creation	Viscount Monck; 1801–1802	Succeeded by Henry Monck
New creation	Baron Monck; 1797–1802	Succeeded by Henry Monck
