= Drom, County Tipperary =

Drom An Drom
- Village
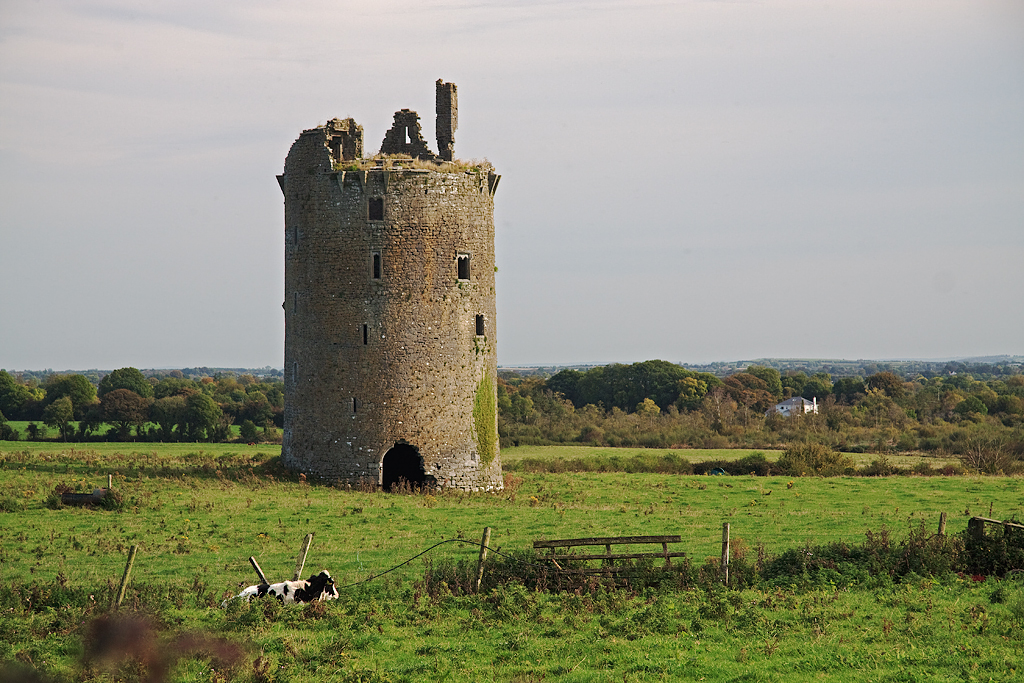
- Knockagh Castle on the Templemore road

- Location in Ireland
- Coordinates: 52°46′03″N 7°53′47″W
- Country: Ireland
- Province: Munster
- County: County Tipperary

Population (2006)
  - Total: 129
- Time zone: UTC+0 (WET)
  - Summer (DST): UTC-1 (IST (WEST))

Drom (Irish: An Drom, meaning 'the ridge') is a village in County Tipperary, Ireland. It is located just off the main Borrisoleigh to Templemore road. Its population was 129 at the 2006 census.

The village, now administered for local government purposes as part of County Tipperary, is one half of the Ecclesiastical parish of "Drom and Inch" which is in the Roman Catholic Archdiocese of Cashel and Emly. The parish also incorporates Barnane. Drom is also a civil parish in the historical barony of Eliogarty.

== Amenities and facilities ==
The nearby Devil's Bit mountain range affords opportunities for trekking and horse riding. Drom village has numerous facilities, including Catholic Church, Community Centre, Pub and GAA grounds.

St Mary's Catholic Church in Drom was built in 1829 for Fr Thomas Mullaney, whose name is inscribed over the front door. The limestone used to build the church was quarried locally at a site about half a mile east of the church. Timber was drawn from Limerick and much of the work was carried out by voluntary labour. A pentagonal belfry was erected at the rear of the church in 1859. The churchyard contains a sundial which was carved by Dan Ryan of Kilvilcorris. It is inscribed with a harp and shamrock and the latitude and longitude of the church. Thomas O'Dwyer of Bouladuff, who was shot while lying in bed by British Forces on 20 March 1920 during the War of Independence, is buried in the churchyard. The church underwent significant refurbishment in 1988 under the guidance of Fr Patrick Flynn.

The sports ground in the village is used by Drom & Inch GAA club. Measuring approximately 100 metres by 60 metres, it is not a full-sized GAA pitch and consequently it is mostly used for juvenile games and training sessions.

== See also ==
- List of civil parishes of County Tipperary
