= Kilsheelan =

Village in County Tipperary, Ireland

Kilsheelan Irish: Cill Síoláin
- Village
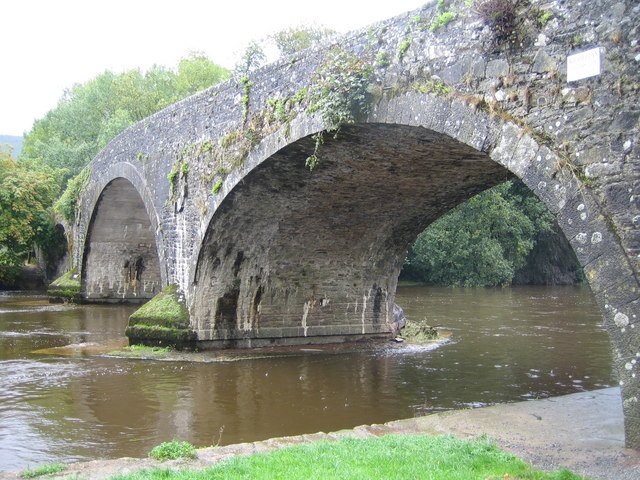
- Kilsheelan Bridge, built c.1820

- Location in Ireland
- Coordinates: 52°21′41″N 7°34′49″W
- Country: Ireland
- Province: Munster
- County: County Tipperary

Population (2016)
  - Total: 812
- Time zone: UTC+0 (WET)
  - Summer (DST): UTC-1 (IST (WEST))

Kilsheelan (Irish: Cill Síoláin) is a village and civil parish within the barony of Iffa and Offa East in County Tipperary, Ireland. A part of the civil parish is in neighbouring County Waterford. It is also one half of the Roman Catholic parish of Kilsheelan & Kilcash in the Roman Catholic Diocese of Waterford and Lismore.

It is situated on the north bank of the River Suir, 8.5 kilometres (5.3 mi) east of Clonmel and 11.8 km (7.3 mi) west of Carrick-on-Suir, on the N24 and R706 roads. As of 2016, it had a population of 812 people.

Kilsheelan is notable in having won the Tidy Towns competition twice, in both 1975 and 1979. It is represented by the Kilsheelan-Kilcash GAA club.

== History ==
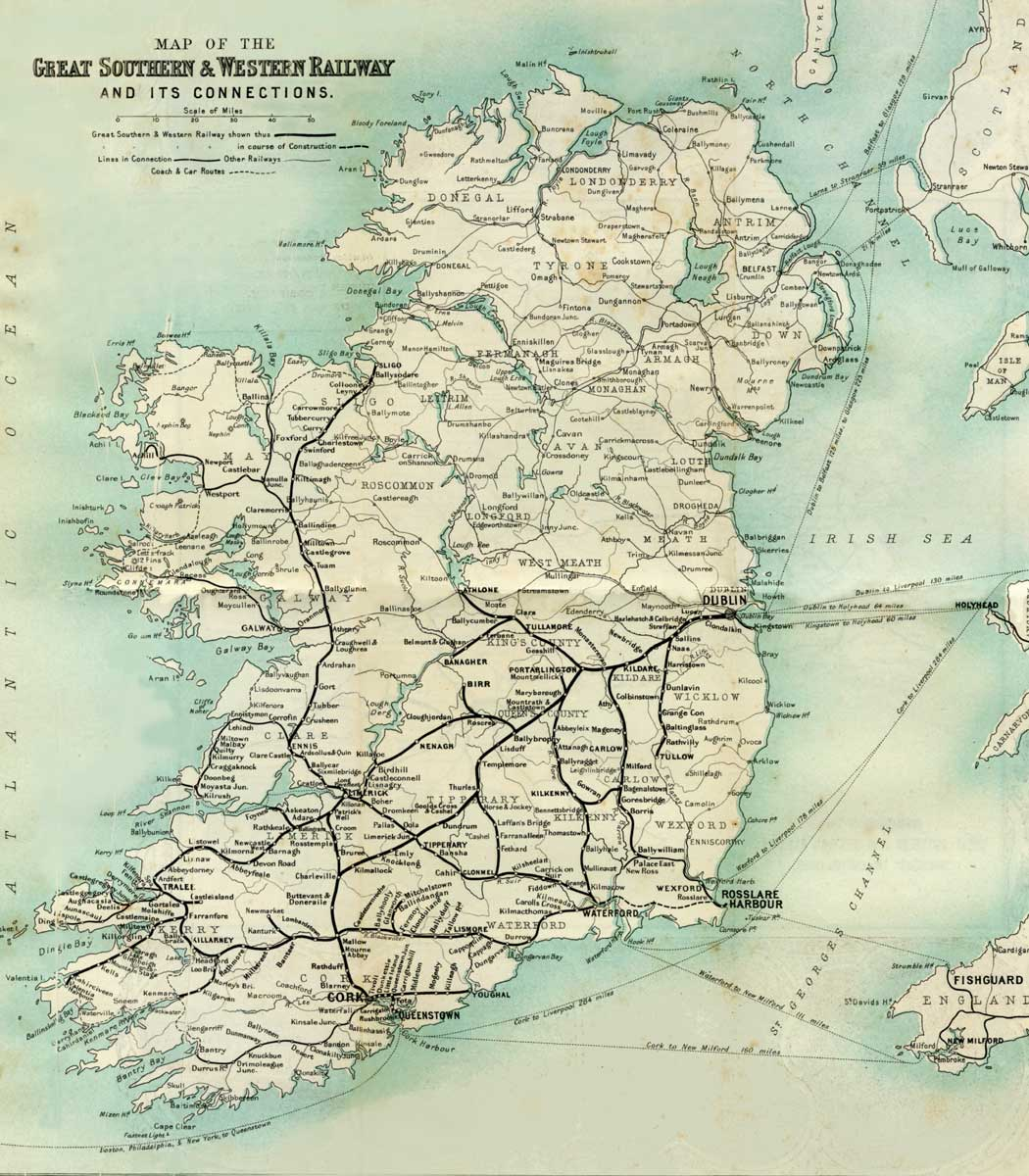
GSWR Ireland route map(Thick Black Lines) showing Kilsheelan station, circa 1902

Excavations in 2006 at a residential development revealed evidence of settlement at the village dating back to early Neolithic period. Finds included pottery fragments, stone blades and seeds.

The name of the village in Irish is Cill Síoláin, meaning church of Síolán/Sillan. Síolán is thought to be an early Irish saint probably Sillan, abbot of Bangor Abbey in Bangor, County Down. Síolán can translate to either "seed-basket" or "cullender/sieve".

In 1853 Kilsheelan railway station was opened by the Waterford, Limerick and Western Railway, later taken over by the Great Southern & Western Railway, it being one of many small provincial stations to serve settlements along the route. It was closed in 1963 to passengers and then to goods in 1976. Until 1984 the station served as a block post, at which point sidings and loop were removed. The original Great Southern & Western signal box remains extant, being used to house operator of the adjacent manual level crossing on the R706 road.

=== Historical population ===
Population shown accounts for the entire parish of Kilsheelan starting in 1831.

Year	Population	Change
1831	1,570	–
1841	1,576	0.38
1851	1,491	−5.39
1861	1,130	−24.21
1871	941	−16.73%

== Geography ==
=== Townlands ===
There are 21 townlands in Kilsheelan.

- Ballinvoher
- Ballyboe
- Ballydine (Baile Uí Dhiana)
- Ballyglasheen (Baile Uí Ghlaisín)
- Ballyglasheen Little (Baile Uí Ghlaisín Beag)
- Ballynaraha (Baile na Rátha)
- Ballynevin
- Butlerstown (Baile na mBuitléarach)
- Clashanisky
- Cloghcarrigeen East (Cloch Charraigín Thoir)
- Cloghcarrigeen West (Cloch Charraigín Thiar)
- Clonwalsh
- Eustaceland (Fearann Iústáis)
- Gammonsfield (Gort an Ghambúnaigh)
- Gortbrack (An Gort Breac)
- Greensland (An tArd Glas)
- Kilsheelan (Cill Síoláin)
- Knockanclash
- Lisbalting
- Lisnatubbrid
- Mauganstown (Baile Mhágúin)
- Minorstown (Baile an Mhionúraigh)
- Mullenaranky
- Poulakerry (Poll an Choire)
- Priorstown
- Seskin (An Seisceann)
- Skehanagh (An Sceachánach)
- Temple-Etney

== Facilities ==
Kilsheelan has four pubs, three hairdressers, a church and adjoining cemetery, two shops, a post office, primary school, Playschool, and a car dealership.

In 2004, Marilyn Manson married the burlesque performer Dita Von Teese in a ceremony at Castle Gurteen de la Poer in Kilsheelan. The castle is the home of artist Gottfried Helnwein since 1998, and was built in 1863 by the de la Poer family.

== Transport ==
The Limerick–Rosslare railway line passes through Kilsheelan but the station is closed. Clonmel railway station, some 9 km distant, is now the nearest railway station. Kilsheelan is served by Bus Éireann routes 7 (Dublin to Cork), 55 (Waterford to Limerick) & 367 (Carrick-on-Suir to Clonmel).

Preceding station	Disused railways	Following station
Clonmel	Great Southern and Western Railway; Limerick-Rosslare railway line	Carrick on Suir

== Gallery ==
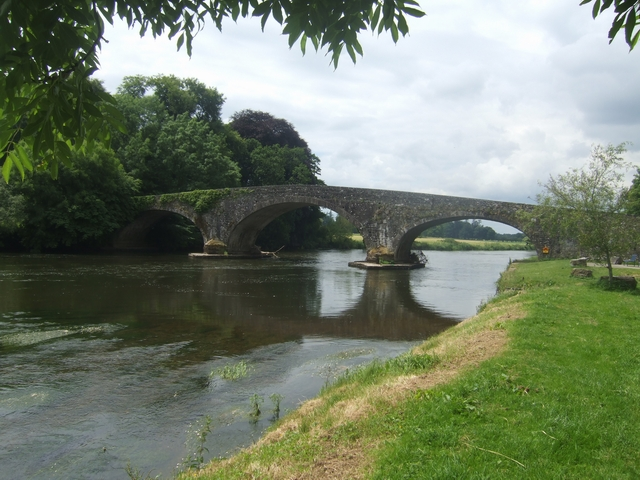
Kilsheelan Bridge

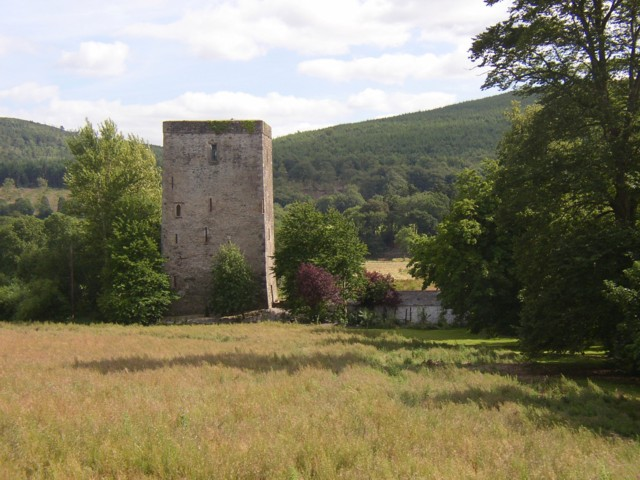
A tower house near Kilsheelan

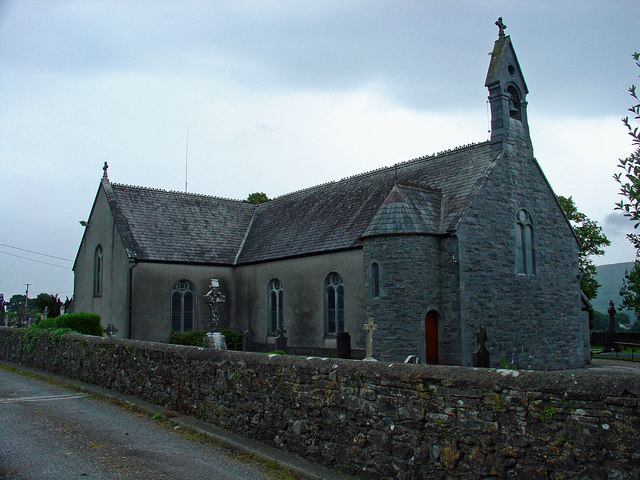
Saint Mary's Church

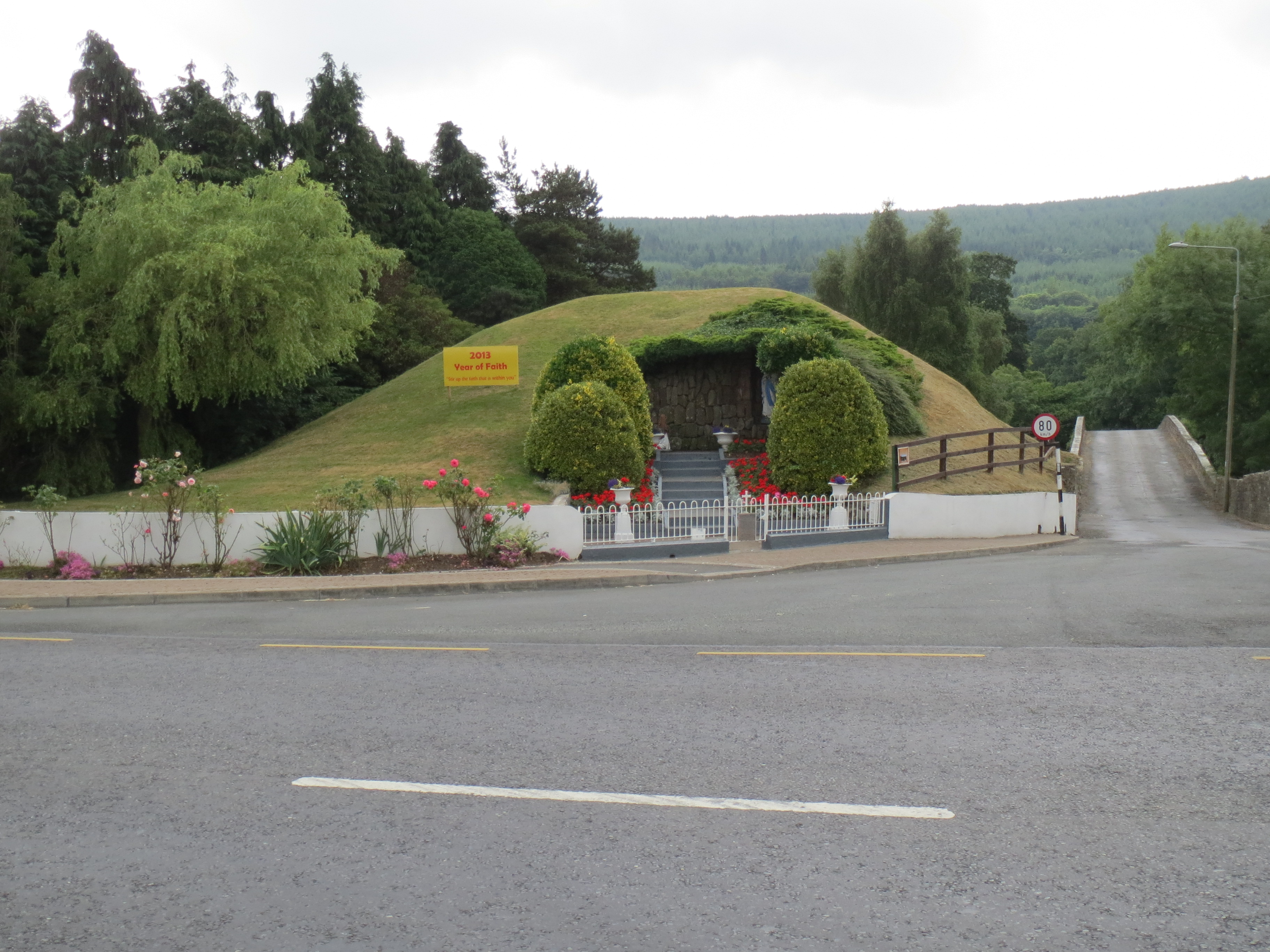
Motte in Kilsheelan

== See also ==
- List of civil parishes of County Tipperary
- Castle Gurteen de la Poer
- Kilsheelan–Kilcash GAA
