= R706 road (Ireland) =

Regional road in Ireland

R706 road
- Bóthar R706
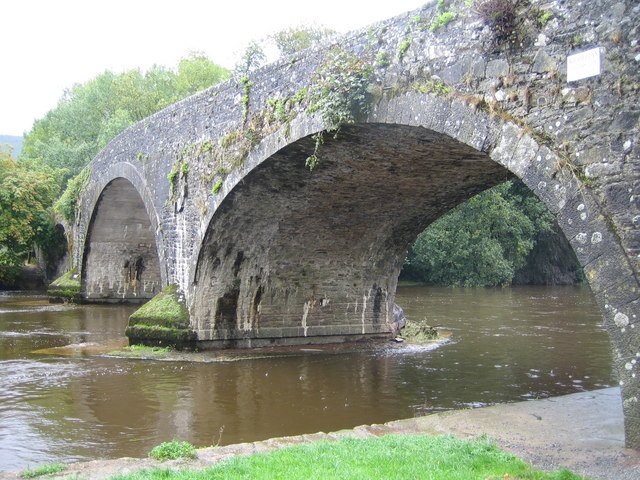
- Kilsheelan Bridge carries the R706 over the River Suir

Route information
- Length: 16.5 km (10.3 mi)

Major junctions
- From: R689 at Fethard, County Tipperary
- Cross River Anner; N76 at Seskin; N24 at Kilsheelan; Cross River Suir; Enter County Waterford
- To: R680 at Gurteen Lower, County Waterford

Location
- Country: Ireland

Highway system
- Roads in Ireland; Motorways; Primary; Secondary; Regional
← R705	→ R707

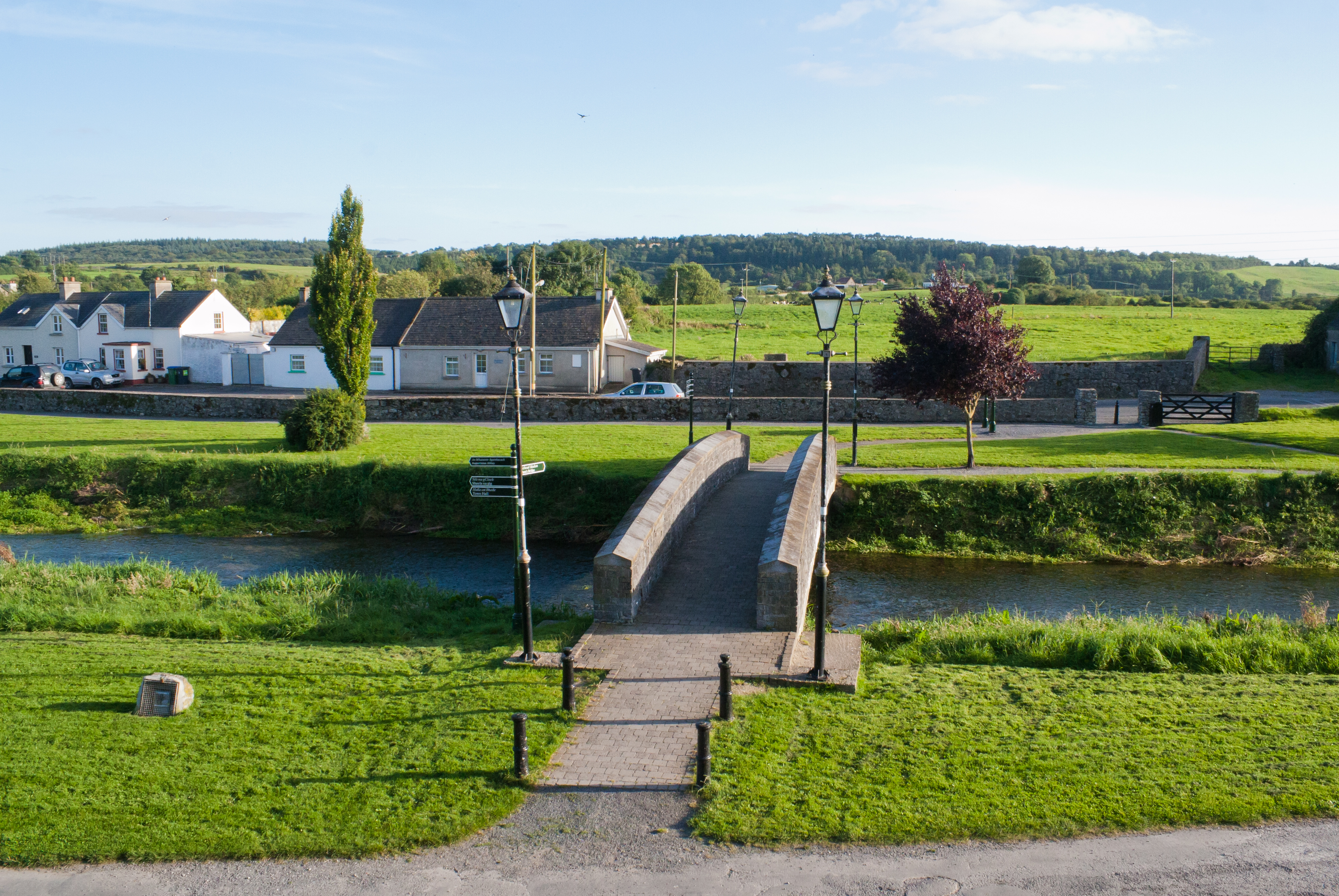
Clashawley River in Fethard with R706 in background

The R706 road is a regional road in Ireland. It travels from the R689 road in Fethard, County Tipperary to the R680 road in County Waterford, just south of the River Suir and the village of Kilsheelan. The road is 16.5 kilometres (10.3 mi) long.
