= R690 road (Ireland) =

Regional road in County Tipperary, Ireland

R690 road
- Bóthar R690
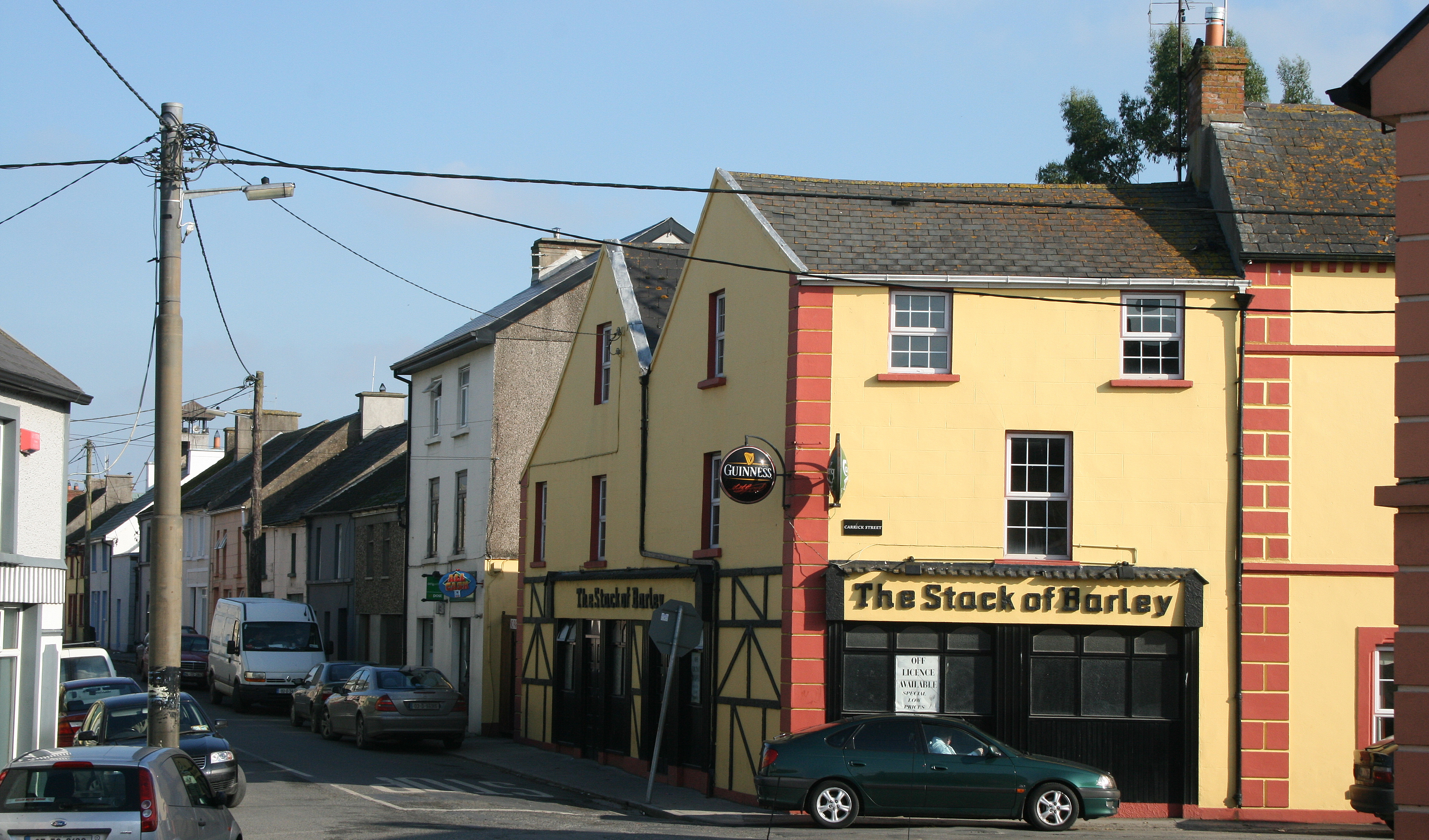
- Mullinahone, County Tipperary, on the R690

Route information
- Length: 29.6 km (18.4 mi)

Major junctions
- From: R689 at Tranagh, County Tipperary

- R691 at Ballingarry Lower; R692 at Mullinahone; R692 at Mullinoly
- To: N76 at Ninemilehouse

Location
- Country: Ireland

Highway system
- Roads in Ireland; Motorways; Primary; Secondary; Regional
← R689	→ R691

The R690 road is a regional road in County Tipperary, Ireland. It travels from the R689 road to the N76 at Ninemilehouse, via the village of Mullinahone. The road is 29.6 kilometres (18.4 mi) long.
