= R707 road (Ireland) =

Regional road in County Tipperary, Ireland

R707 road
- Bóthar R707

Route information
- Length: 5.7 km (3.5 mi)

Major junctions
- From: N24 at Ballingarrane South, County Tipperary
- R884 at Toberaheena; R688 at Doctor O'Callaghan Row, Clonmel; R688 at Upper Gladstone Street, Clonmel; R689 at Thomas Street, Clonmel; R884 at The Mall, Clonmel; R671 at O'Connell Terrace, Clonmel
- To: N24 at Moangarriff

Location
- Country: Ireland

Highway system
- Roads in Ireland; Motorways; Primary; Secondary; Regional
← R706	→ R708

The R707 road is a regional road in County Tipperary, Ireland. It travels from the N24 road west of Clonmel, through the town, rejoining the N24 east of the town. The road is 5.7 kilometres (3.5 mi) long.
