= R707 road =

R707 road may refer to:

- R707 road (Ireland)
- R707 (South Africa)
