= R692 road (Ireland) =

Road in Ireland

R692 road
- Bóthar R692
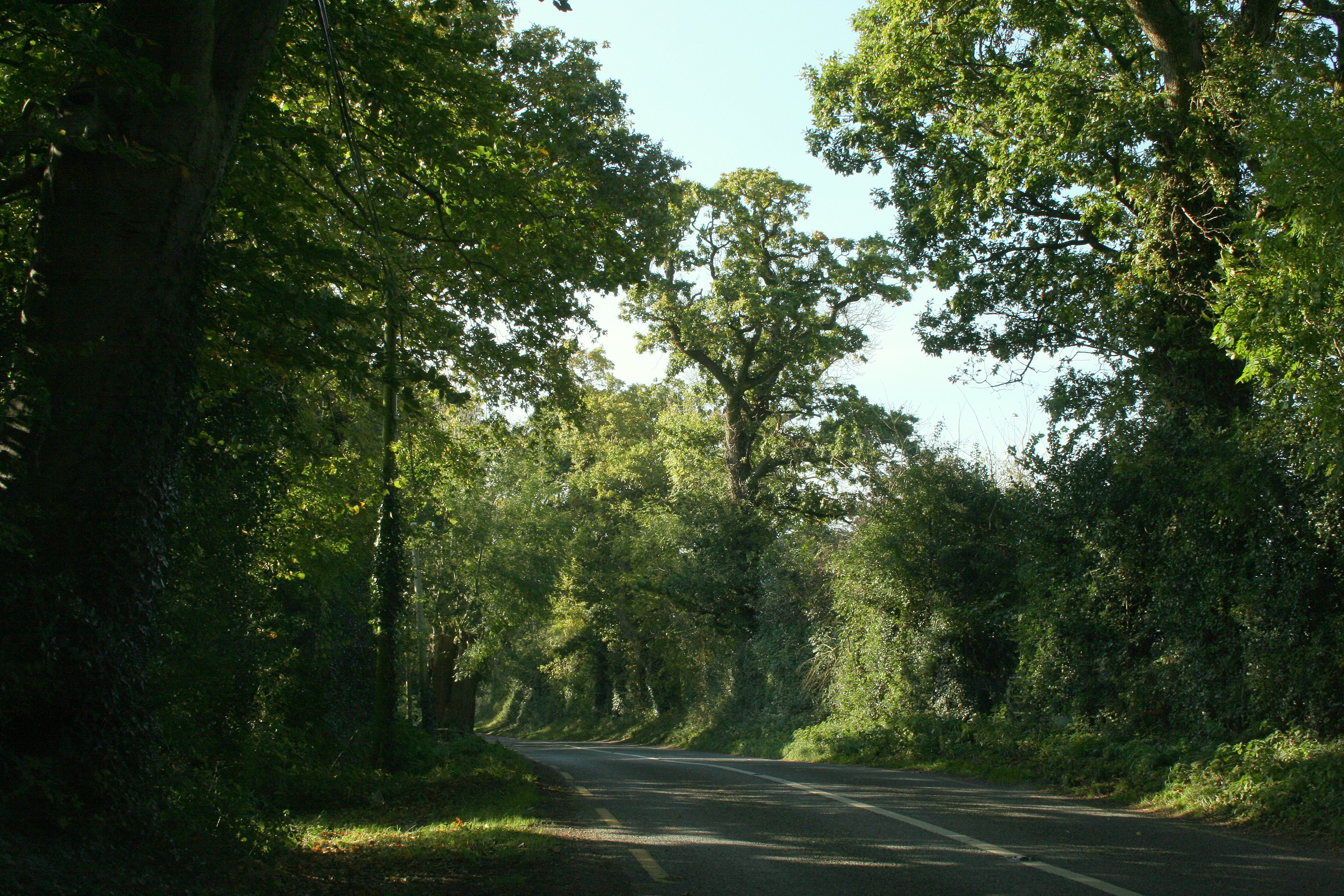
- R692 between Cloneen and Mullinahone

Route information
- Length: 47 km (29 mi)

Location
- Country: Ireland
- Primary destinations: County Tipperary; Cashel leave the town centre; (R688); Passes over the M8; Fethard – joins/leaves the R689; Cloneen; Mullinahone – joins/leaves the R690; County Kilkenny; Terminates at the N76 south of Callan

Highway system
- Roads in Ireland; Motorways; Primary; Secondary; Regional

The R692 road is a regional road in Ireland linking Cashel, County Tipperary to Callan, County Kilkenny. It passes through Fethard and Mullinahone en route, and meets the M8 motorway 1km east of Cashel. The road is 47 km (29 mi) long.

== See also ==
- Roads in Ireland
- National primary road
- National secondary road
