= R706 road =

R706 road may refer to:

- R706 road (Ireland)
- R706 (South Africa)
