= Seán Brett =

Irish Gaelic footballer

Personal information
- Native name: Seán de Breit (Irish)
- Born: 1967 (age 58–59) Mullinahone, County Tipperary, Ireland

Sport
- Sport: Gaelic football
- Position: Left corner-forward
Club
- Years: Club
- Mullinahone
Club titles
- Tipperary titles: 0
Inter-county
- Years: County
- 1989-1996: Tipperary
Inter-county titles
- Munster titles: 0
- All-Irelands: 0
- NFL: 0
- All Stars: 0

Seán Brett (born 1967) is an Irish retired Gaelic footballer who played as a left corner-forward for the Tipperary senior team.

Born in Mullinahone, County Tipperary, Brett first arrived on the inter-county scene at the age of sixteen when he first linked up with the Tipperary minor team before later joining the under-21 and junior sides. Brett joined the senior panel during the 1989 championship.

At club level Brett played with Mullinahone.

He retired from inter-county football following the conclusion of the 1996 championship.

== Honours ==
=== Player ===
Tipperary

- McGrath Cup (2): 1989, 1993
- Munster Junior Hurling Championship (1): 1990
- Munster Minor Football Championship (1): 1984
