= Irish units of measurement =

Obsolete system of measurement used in Ireland

Early Irish law texts record a wide variety of units of measurement, organised into various systems. These were used from Early Christian Ireland (Middle Ages) or perhaps earlier, before being displaced by Irish measure from the 16th century onward.

== Length ==
A troighid ("foot") was the length of a man's foot, divided into twelve ordlach, "thumb-lengths". These figures assume a man's foot to measure 25 cm (9.8 in).

Table of length units
Unit	Meaning	Relative value	SI value	Imperial value	Notes
grán	grain	1/36	0.7 cm	1/4 inch	
ordlach	thumb-length	1/12	2.1 cm	0.8 in	
bas	palm	1/3	8.4 cm	3.3 in	
dorn	fist	5/12 or 1/2	10.4 or 12.5 cm	4 or 5 in	
troighid	foot	1	25 cm	9.9 in	
céim	step	2.5	62.5 cm	2 ft 1 in	
deiscéim[m]	double-step	6	1.5 m	4 ft 11 in	
fertach	rod	12	3 m	9 ft 10 in	
forrach		144	36 m	39.4 yards	

A magh-space was a unit set at the distance from which a cock-crow or bell could be heard. Other units such as inntrit and lait appear in documents; their value is uncertain, perhaps being equivalent to 1 and 2 fertachs respectively.

Ancient Laws of Ireland reads ceithri orlaighi i mbais, teora basa i troighid (4 thumb-lengths in a palm, 3 palms in a foot). and

"Catalogue of the Irish manuscripts in the British Museum v.1" gives ceithri gráine an t-órdlach (4 grains in the thumb-length).

Stair Ercuil ocus a bás: the life and death of Hercules mentions ceim curadh (warrior's paces).

== Area ==
The basic unit of area was the tir-cumaile, "land of three cows", as it was an area of land that was at some point worth three cows. It is sometimes erroneously interpreted as the area needed to graze three cows, but it is far too large for that; in modern Ireland, a cow grazes on about 0.4 ha, so twenty or more could graze a tir-cumaile. Ireland in total covered about 870,000 tir-cumaile.

Table of area units
Unit	Meaning	Relative value	SI value	Imperial value	Notes
tir-cumaile	land of three cows	n/a	9.3 ha	23 ac	72 square forraigh
achar	acre	1			Adopted following Norman invasions.
seisrech	plough-land	120			
baile	townland	1,440			The term "townland" is still used to designate very small named areas in the countryside.
tuath		4,320			Originally a term for a petty kingdom.

== Capacity ==
A hen's eggshell was used as a standard unit, roughly 55 ml.

Table of capacity units
Unit	Meaning	Relative value	SI value	Imperial value	Notes
og	eggshell	1/12	55 mL	2 fl. oz.	
méisrin	little measure	1	660 mL	1 pint 3 fl. oz.	
olderb	great vessel	12	7.92 L	1.74 gallons	
oilmedach	great mead [vessel]	144	95 L	21 gallons	

== Mass ==
Table of mass units
Unit	Meaning	Relative value	SI value	Imperial value	Notes
grán	grain	1/8	0.05 g	0.772 Gr	One grain of the best wheat.
pinginn, penginn	pennyweight	1	0.4 g	6.173 Gr	
screpul(l), scripul(l), screaball	scruple	3	1.2 g	18.519 Gr	
ungae, uinge	ounce	72	28 g	1 oz	Word borrowed from the Latin uncia, although an older native name was mann.

The Manners and Customs of Ireland lists two types of unge: unge mór at 20 pennyweights (31.1 g) and unge beg at 10 pennyweights (15.6 g).

A screpall óir (gold scruple) was used for measuring gold weight and was equal to a quarter-ounce (7 g).

== Time ==
A night (oídhche) was used as a measure for time in preference to a day. As was normal for Islam and Jews and in line with the Bible (It was evening and morning of the first day), the Irish held that a new day began at sunset, not at sunrise, so that a Wednesday night would precede the day of Wednesday.

== See also ==
- List of obsolete units of measurement
- Metrication in Ireland
- Irish measure
