= Iffa and Offa East =

Barony in County Tipperary, Ireland

Iffa and Offa East (Irish: Uíbh Eoghain agus Uíbh Fhathaidh Thoir) is a barony in County Tipperary, Ireland. This geographical unit of land is one of 12 baronies in County Tipperary. Its chief town is Clonmel. The barony lies between Iffa and Offa West to the west (whose chief town is Cahir), Middle Third to the north-west (whose chief town is Cashel) and Slievardagh to the north-east (whose chief town is Mullinahone). It is currently administered by Tipperary County Council. The entire barony lies within the geographic remit of the Roman Catholic Diocese of Waterford and Lismore with the exception of the parish of Clerihan which is in the Roman Catholic Archdiocese of Cashel and Emly.

== Legal context ==
Baronies were created after the Norman invasion of Ireland as divisions of counties and were used the administration of justice and the raising of revenue. While baronies continue to be officially defined units, they have been administratively obsolete since 1898. However, they continue to be used in land registration and in specification, such as in planning permissions. In many cases, a barony corresponds to an earlier Gaelic túath which had submitted to the Crown.

== History ==
As the name suggests, in medieval times the territory of the barony (and its neighbour to the west) was controlled by the Gaelic clans of Uíbh Eoghain and Uíbh Fhathaidh. Following the conquest of Ireland by the Normans, much of the territory was, by royal grant, handed over to the Butlers of Ormond. The title Earl of Carrick was first created in 1315 for Sir Edmund Butler, Justiciar of Ireland, by King Edward II of England. The title is linked to the manor of "Karryk Mac Gryffin" (see history section of Carrick-on-Suir for elaboration). Edmund was the father of James Butler and John Butler of Clonamicklon whose descendants later became Viscounts Ikerrin and Earls of Carrick. Sir Edmund Butler had distinguished himself in the fight against the Bruce invasion of Ireland. Edmund was granted a charter of the castle and manor of Carrick, Macgryffin and Roscrea to hold to him and his heirs sub nomine et honore comitis de Karryk on 1 September 1315. However, the charter, while creating an earldom, failed to make Edmund's heir James "Earl of Carrick". It was not until 7 years after the death of his father that he was rewarded for his loyalty to the Crown with an earldom in his own right - that of Earl of Ormond - in 1328. Ormonde Castle in the town of Carrick-on-Suir continued to be the main family residence up to the time of James Butler, 3rd Earl of Ormond. It was he who built Gowran Castle and later purchased Kilkenny Castle which was to become the seat of the Butler family from that point onwards.

=== Modern times ===
When County Tipperary was split into North and South Ridings in 1836, Iffa and Offa East was allocated to the south riding. However, the neighbouring barony of Kilnamanagh was split into Upper and Lower half-baronies, being allocated to the north and south ridings respectively.

== Features ==
The barony lies in the lower reaches of the Suir valley. The river forms the border with neighbouring County Waterford for much of its journey through the barony, with the exception of a "box" around Carrick-on-Suir which straddles both banks. The Comeragh Mountains lie to the south while to the northeast is Slievenamon. The Lingaun River joins the Suir two miles downstream of Carrick-on-Suir. It holds good stocks of trout.

== Towns, villages and townlands of the barony ==
=== Civil parishes of the barony ===
This table lists an historical geographical sub-division of the barony known as the civil parish (not to be confused with an Ecclesiastical parish).

Name in Irish	Name in English
Baile Nua an Loinneáin	Newtownlennan
Baile Uí Chléireacháin	Ballyclerahan
Carraig na Siúire	Carrick-on-Suir
An Chathair	Caher
Cill Chaise	Kilcash
Cill Chrónata	Kilgrant
Cill Mhuire	Kilmurry
Cill Ó Luáin	Killaloan
Cill Síoláin	Kilsheelan
Cill Tagáin	Kiltegan
Domhnach Mór	Donaghmore
An Eaglais Nua	Newchapel
Garrán Ghiobúin	Garrangibbon
Inis Leamhnachta	Inishlounaght
Lios Ruanach	Lisronagh
Paróiste Mhuire	St. Mary's, Clonmel
Ráth Rónáin	Rathronan
Teampall Eithne	Temple-etney (Templeetney)

Note: Even though Clonmel is the largest town in the county, it is not a civil parish in its own right.

== See also ==
- Kilcash Castle
- List of civil parishes of South Tipperary
