= Ninemilehouse =

Ninemilehouse Tigh na Naoi Míle
- Village
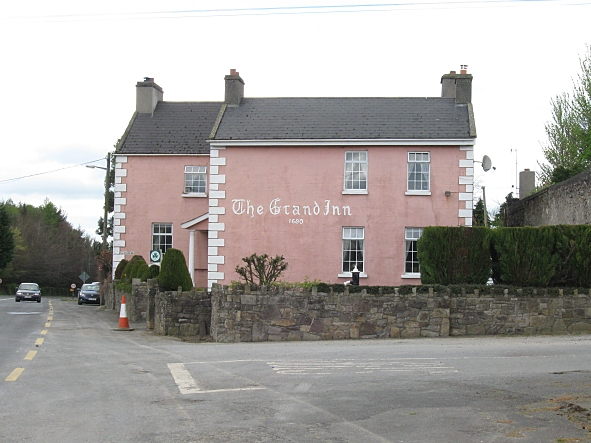
- The Grand Inn in Ninemilehouse

- Location in Ireland
- Coordinates: 52°27′40″N 7°27′48″W
- Country: Ireland
- Province: Munster
- County: County Tipperary
- Time zone: UTC+0 (WET)
  - Summer (DST): UTC-1 (IST (WEST))

Ninemilehouse (Irish: Tigh na Naoi Míle), historically called Killcullen (Irish: Cill Chuillinn) is a village in County Tipperary, Ireland. It lies on the N76 national secondary road at its junction with the R690 regional road.

Ninemilehouse is on the border with County Kilkenny, on a pass through the eastern foothills of Slievenamon. It derives its name from the fact that it is nine Irish miles (18 km; 11 statute miles) along Glenbower along the turnpike road.

== See also ==
- List of towns and villages in Ireland
