= Metrication in Ireland =

Adoption of the metric system of measurements in Ireland

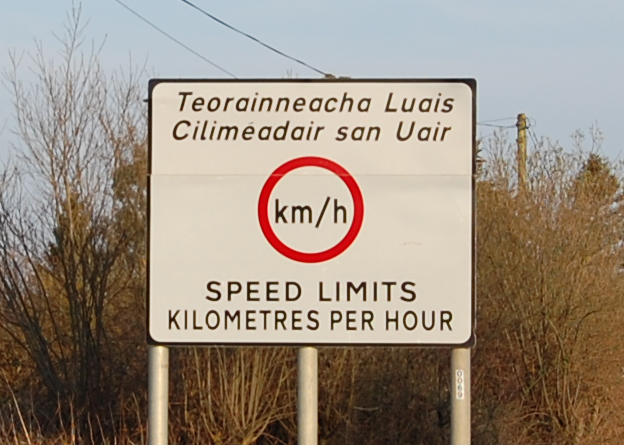
Information sign about the speed limit units used in Ireland

Metrication in the Republic of Ireland happened mostly in the 20th century and was officially completed in 2005, with a few exceptions.

The island of Ireland gradually adopted the British imperial measurement system, fully replacing traditional Irish measure during the 19th century, and these units continued to be used after the independence of the Irish Free State (1922) and the establishment of the Republic of Ireland (1937/49). The Irish Free State joined the Metre Convention in 1925. In 1980 the European Union asked all of its member states to convert to the metric system, and in Ireland and the UK this process was originally to have been completed by 2009. Metrication succeeded in Ireland with the changeover fully completed in 2005, with some exceptions.

== Metrication ==
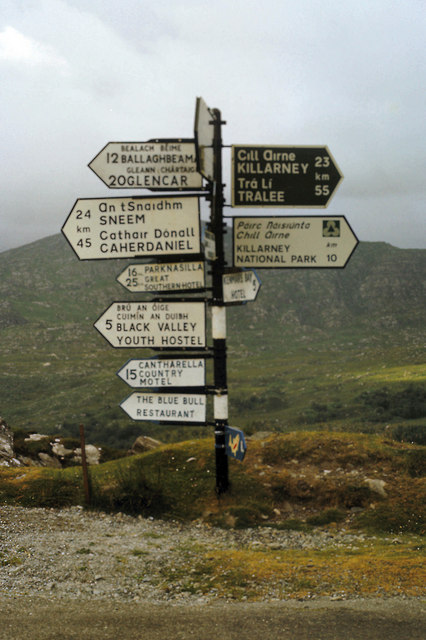
Signs introduced in the 1970s showed distances in kilometres, sometimes alongside older signs with distances in miles.

During the First World War and after the Easter Rising, Charles A Stanuell, former President of the Statistical and Social Inquiry Society of Ireland, published a paper advocating the use of the metric system and a decimal currency in the UK, of which Ireland was then a part.

Metrication in Ireland began in the 1970s and by 2005 was completed, with the main exception being that the imperial pint (568 ml) is still used in eateries and pubs for reasons of tradition. The phrase a "glass of beer" is a colloquial expression for a half-pint (284 ml). All other loose goods sold by volume must be sold using metric units.

Distances shown on directional road signs had displayed kilometres since the 1970s but road speed limits were in miles per hour until 20 January 2005, when they were changed to kilometres per hour. Since 2005 all new cars sold in Ireland have speedometers that display only kilometres per hour; odometers generally became metric as well.

The metric system is the only system taught in schools. Beginning in 1970, textbooks were changed to metric. Goods in shops are labelled in metric units.

== Continuation of supplementary imperial units ==
In 2006, it became apparent that the 2009 cut-off for the use of Imperial supplementary units could cause problems in US-EU trade. After consultation, EU Directive 2009/3/EC of 11 March 2009, among other measures, permitted:

- The indefinite use of supplementary units allowed.
- The United Kingdom and Ireland to continue the limited exemptions concerning specified uses of the pint, mile, and troy ounce, considering the absence of any impact of these exemptions on cross-border trade and the principle of subsidiarity; whilst repealing the exemption for the use of acres for land registration which is no longer applied.

These amendments were published on 7 May 2009 and became effective on 1 January 2010.

== Exceptions to Irish metrication ==
=== Legal units for trade ===
- Draught beer or cider must be sold in imperial pints.
- Precious metals may be sold in troy ounces.

=== Packaged goods ===
- The majority of packaged butter sold in Irish supermarkets are half-pound and pound sizes, but are labelled as 227 g and 454 g.
- Milk cartons served at schools are 1/3 pint (189 ml) in volume, despite milk in shops being in litres.

=== Other ===
- Horse racing in Ireland continues to use stones, pounds, miles, and furlongs as measurements.
- Whilst roads in Ireland measure distances in metres and kilometres and speed limits in kilometres per hour, the railway network operates on imperial measurements with distances in miles and speeds in miles per hour.
- Whilst petrol and diesel are sold in litres, barrels of oil are measured in imperial gallons.
- Some golf courses are measured in metres whilst others are measured in yards.
- Tyre pressure is measured in pounds per square inch (PSI).
- Like in most countries, display sizes for screens on television sets and computer monitors have their diagonal measured in inches.
- Like in most countries, altitude and flight level are measured in feet.

== References in Oireachtas debates ==
- That the Government be asked to appoint a Commission, with power to examine voluntary witnesses, to inquire into and report on the desirability or otherwise of adopting the Metric System in Saorstát Eireann, Senator de Loughry (April 1923). "Notice of motion". Archived from the original on 11 June 2011.
- "Question to the Minister for Education to request support for the teachers association vote in favour of metrication". 1951. Archived from the original on 25 September 2012.
- "Question to the Minister for Finance on plans to introduce decimal coinage and the metric system". May 1964. Archived from the original on 1 September 2012.
- "Question to the Minister for Industry and Commerce to request for a decision to be made in favour of metrication". June 1967. Archived from the original on 25 September 2012.
- "Question to the Minister for Industry and Commerce". October 1967. Archived from the original on 1 September 2012.
- In the area of prepackaged goods the changeover is virtually complete, "Question to the Minister for Industry and Commerce on enforcement of the regulations on food pricing (in metric)". November 1987. Archived from the original on 1 September 2012.
- "Question to the Minister for Industry and Commerce". December 1989. Archived from the original on 1 September 2012.
- "Question to the Minister for Transport on the timetable for metric speed limits". June 2003. Archived from the original on 1 September 2012.
- "Question to the Minister for Transport on the timetable for metric speed limits". October 2003. Archived from the original on 1 September 2012.

== See also ==
- Old Irish units of measurement
- Irish measure
