= Sillan =

Mediaeval Irish abbot and saint

Saint Sillan
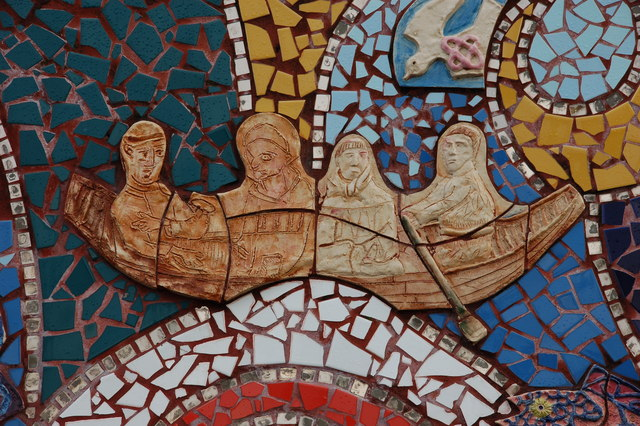
- Mosaic at Bangor harbour depicting St Comgall and other monks, one likely being Sillan
- Born: c.6th century Unknown
- Died: 608 or 610
- Venerated in: Roman Catholic Church, Anglican Church; Orthodox Church
- Feast: 28 February or 28 March

Saint Sillan (or Sillian) (Latin: Selanus; Irish: Síoláin) (died 608 or 610) was early Irish saint and abbot of Bangor Abbey, Bangor, County Down. He was recorded as being a disciple and second or third successor of Saint Comgall, who was the founder and first abbot of the Benedictine monastery at Bangor. The village of Kilsheelan, County Tipperary is named after him. His Irish name is Sioláin which can translate to either "seed-basket" or "cullender/sieve".

He is recorded in both the Annals of Tigernach and Annals of Ulster as abbot Bennchor (Bangor), in the former as Sillán moccu Cumaine, dying in 608 and the latter as Sillán moccu Minn, dying in 610. Moccu being the equivalent of the Latin gens, indicating an uncertain ancestry.

Variations of his name include Siollan, Silvan, Sylvan, Sillian and Sillán, amongst others.
