= Castle Gurteen de la Poer =

Elizabethan Revival house in Ireland

Coordinates: 52.3605°N 7.5929°W

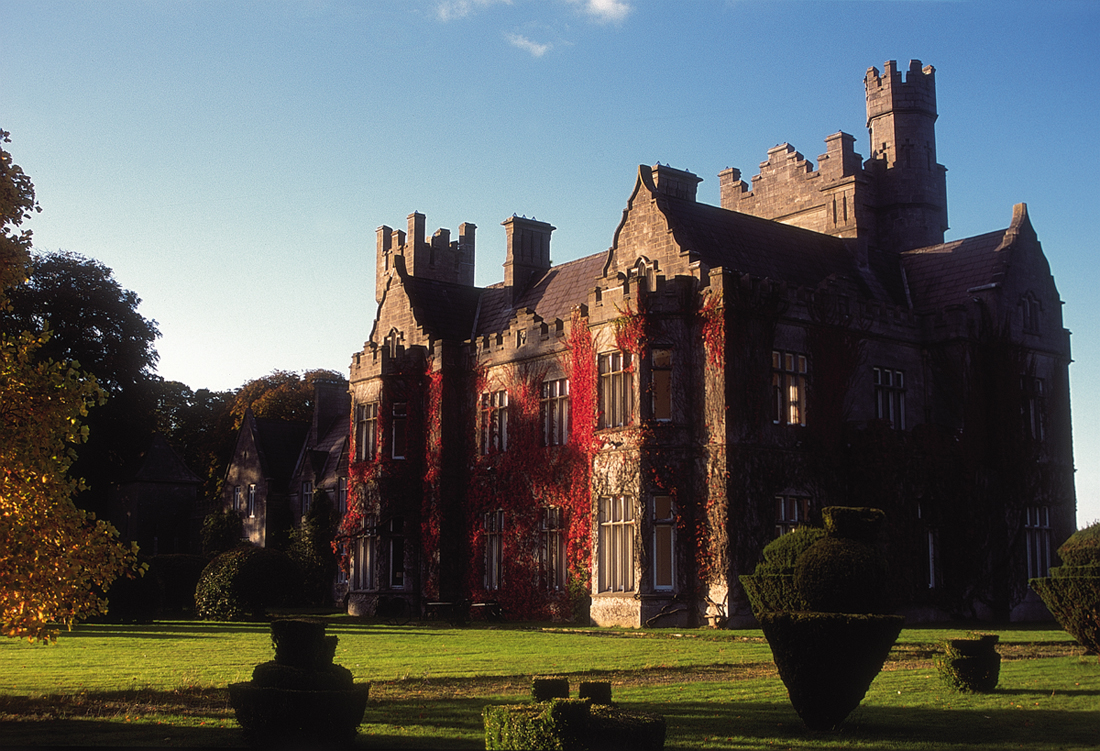
Castle Gurteen de la Poer

Gurteen de la Poer, or Gurteen le Poer, is an Elizabethan Revival house in County Waterford, Ireland, situated on the south bank of the River Suir, close to Kilsheelan and about 8 km east of Clonmel.

The estate belonged to the de la Poers, an Anglo-Norman family whose affiliation with the Catholic Church led to their eventual expulsion from the Protestant English establishment. Edmund, 1st Count de la Poer, 18th Lord le Poer and Curraghmore, a Knight of Malta and Private Chamberlain to Pope Pius X, commenced the building of the present castle in 1863 to replace an earlier house which itself replaced a yet earlier house.

The large baronial house was designed by Samuel Ussher Roberts (1821–1900), great-grandson of the 18th century Waterford architect John Roberts. The design of Castle Gurteen was probably influenced by Scottish architect William Burn, an architect responsible for several Tudor-Baronial mansions in Britain. Construction began 1863 and was completed in 1866. After the completion of Castle Gurteen, Samuel Ussher Roberts also designed Kylemore Castle (now Kylemore Abbey) in County Galway. A number of features used at Gurteen were also used at Kylemore, and the same builder, Thomas Carroll, worked on both castles.

== Architecture ==
The entrance façade has a large square tower with attached polygonal turret, which faces across a forecourt of castled walls. The interior of Gurteen is spacious and in the centre of the house is a top lit great hall with a gallery, divided by a screen of Gothic arches behind which is a staircase.

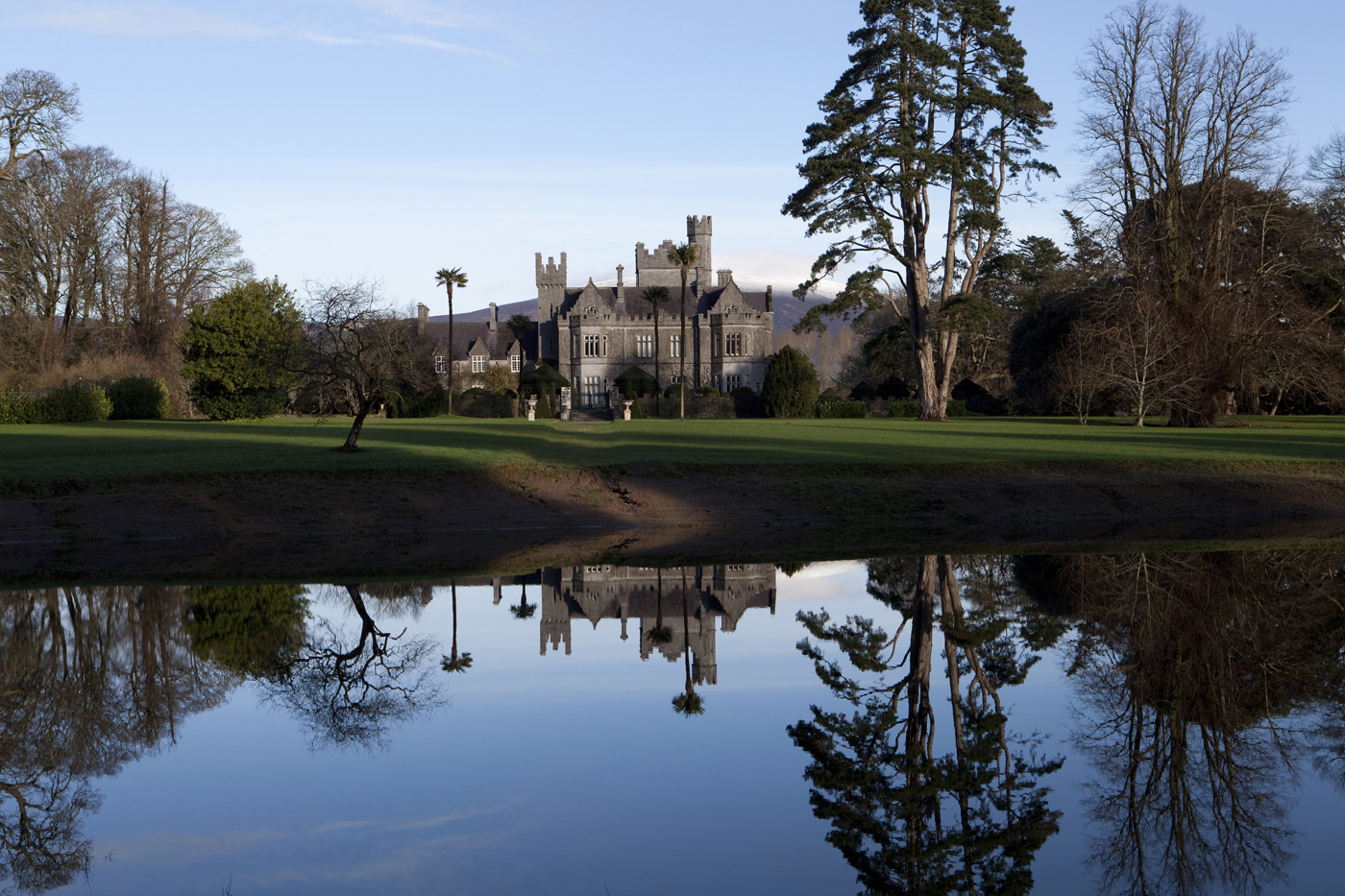
Castle Gurteen de la Poer, Winter 2015

There are similar arches in the first floor gallery, which like the staircase, has a balustrade of wrought Iron. The library which is lined with bookcases has red walls, and the drawing room and ballroom open into each other along the garden front. The dining room, on the other side of the hall, is to a Victorian Baronial style, with faded red walls above a dado of brown oak panelling. The chimney piece, of carved oak has heraldic angels holding shields of the family arms, and its head of St Hubert's Stag - the family crest - with antlers and crucifix mounted on top of the mantle shelf.

== History ==
The le Poer family claims descent from Sir Robert De Poer, who came to Ireland with Strongbow in 1172. King Henry II of England, who, by charter, granted to Robert the City of Waterford, with "the whole province thereabouts;" and made him marshal of Ireland.

Edmund, 1st Count de la Poer, 18th Lord le Poer and Curraghmore (1841–1915), who commissioned the building of Castle Gurteen de la Poer in 1863, was created 1st Count de la Poer (Papal States) in 1864. The Count was High Sheriff of County Waterford in 1879; Private Chamberlain to Pope Pius IX; HM Lord-Lieutenant for the county and city of Waterford, 1909. His second son, John William Rivallon, JP, 19th Baron and 2nd Count (1882–1939), was High Sheriff of County Waterford in 1913. In 1922 he claimed the barony of Le Poer and Curraghmore, and Committee of Privileges of the House of Lords decided that but for the attainder of John Power in 1691, the claim had been established. His eldest son, Edmond Robert Arnold, 20th Baron and 3rd Count, succeeded to the title of 20th Baron le Power and Curraghmore in 1939. He sold Castle Gurteen in 1979 to German businessman Günter Rombelsheim, but retained the right to live in the West Wing of the castle. He died on 20 November 1995 at age the age of 84.

== Gottfried Helnwein ==
In 1998, the artist Gottfried Helnwein purchased Castle Gurteen and began restoration work on the castle and gardens. As of 2016, he lives and works there with his family.

Since Helnwein took residence, the castle has hosted a number of prominent guests. These have included a number in the entertainment industry, including Sean Penn, Ben Kingsley, Marilyn Manson, Lisa Marie Presley, Priscilla Presley and Beck.. Politicians who have visited include ambassador William S. Farish, speaker of the German parliament Antje Vollmer and former President of the Seychelles James R. Mancham.

In December 2005, Marilyn Manson and Dita Von Teese were married in a private non-denominational ceremony at the castle. In December 2014, The New York Times featured a 3 page-article about the Helnwein family at Castle Gurteen de la Poer.
