= Ballyclerahan =

Village in County Tipperary, Ireland

Clerihan Baile Uí Chléireacháin Ballyclerahan
- Village
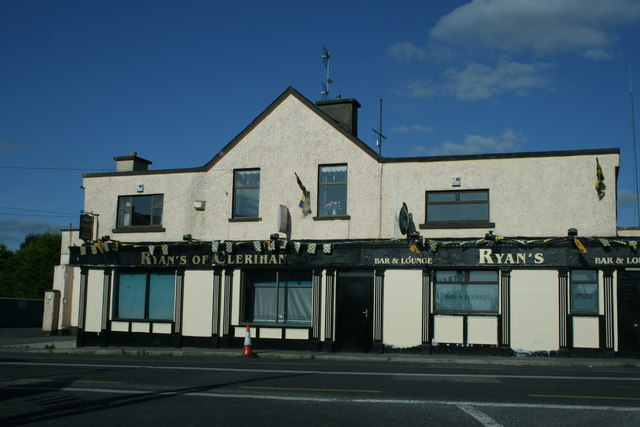
- Ryans of Clerihan public house

- Location in Ireland
- Coordinates: 52°24′43″N 7°47′24″W
- Country: Ireland
- Province: Munster
- County: Tipperary
- Elevation: 100 m (330 ft)

Population (2022)
  - Total: 830
- Time zone: UTC+0 (WET)
  - Summer (DST): UTC-1 (IST (WEST))
- Irish grid reference: S142290

Clerihan or Ballyclerahan (Irish: Baile Uí Chléireacháin, meaning 'the town of Ó Cléireacháin') is a village in County Tipperary, Ireland. It is also a civil parish in the historical barony of Iffa and Offa East. It is approximately 8.5 kilometres north of Clonmel. The village had a population of 830 people as of the 2022 census.

== Name ==
The name Ballyclerahan (Irish: Baile Uí Chléireacháin) comes from the Irish "the town of Ó Cléireacháin". Locally, the "Bally" prefix is usually dropped and the village is almost always referred to simply as "Clerahan" which is most often spelled "Clerihan".

== History ==
Evidence of ancient settlement in the area includes a number of ringfort, ecclesiastical enclosure and castle sites in the townlands of Ballyclerahan, Ballybeg and Knockeevan.

The Civil Survey of 1654–1656 records that "the Towne and lands of Ballycleraghane" were owned by Paule Boyton in the mid-17th century and that "upon the s[ai]d lands stands a little castle and some cabbins [sic]". The Record of Monuments and Places records a possible castle site (of which no archaeological traces remain), in Knockeevan townland, near the site of Knockeevan House (also since demolished).

To the west of the village, in Ballyclerahan townland, is an ecclesiastical enclosure which contains a graveyard and the ruins of an early church. The current parish church, Saint Michael's Catholic Church, is located within the village and was completed in 1820. The local primary (national) school, Clerihan National School or Scoil Náisiúnta Chléireacháin, was originally located in the grounds of this church. It has been based at its current site since 1996.

== Location and transport ==
The village is situated along the R688 regional road from Cashel to Clonmel. As of 2026, the 394 bus route (from Clonmel to Thurles) served the village. Clerihan is approximately 8 kilometres north of the N24 road which leads to Waterford. The closest airport to Clerihan is Waterford Airport located 65 kilometres south of the village and the Port of Waterford is the closest port.

== Sport ==
The local Gaelic Athletic Association (GAA) club, Clerihan GAA, was established in its current form in 2005 and won the South Tipperary Junior Football Championship in 2017.

== See also ==
- List of civil parishes of County Tipperary
- List of towns and villages in Ireland
