= Priorstown =

Priorstown Baile an Phrióra
- Townland
- Location of Priorstown in Ireland
- Coordinates: 52.369°N 7.604°W
- Country: Ireland
- Province: Munster
- County: Tipperary

Area
  - Total: 219 acres (89 ha)

Priorstown (Irish: Baile an Phrióra, meaning 'town of the prior') is a small townland in County Tipperary, Ireland. It is four miles to the east of Clonmel on the N76 road. Priorstown is 0.8 square kilometres (0.3 sq mi) in area, and had a population of 50 people as of the 2011 census.
