= River Anner =

River in County Tipperary, Ireland

Coordinates: 52.457495°N 7.625242°W

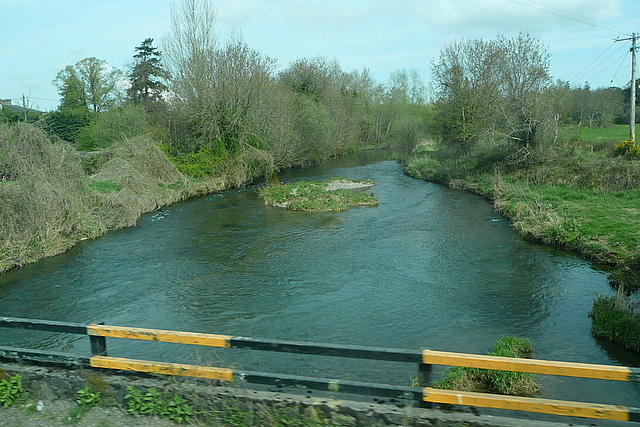
- Near Clonmel
- Native name: An Annúir (Irish)

Physical characteristics
- Mouth
  - location: Waterford Harbour via River Suir
- Length: 37.8 kilometres (23.5 mi)
- Basin size: 444.72 km^{2} (171.71 sq mi)
- Discharge
  - average: 44.87 m^{3}/s (1,585 cu ft/s)

Basin features
- Tributaries
  - right: Clashawley River

The River Anner (Irish: An Annúir) is a river in Ireland, flowing through County Tipperary, a tributary of the Suir.

== Course ==
The River Anner rises south of Mullinahone and flows westwards to the north of Knockahunna. It passes under Melbourne Bridge and turns southwards, meeting the Clashawley River in Grangebeg. It passes under the R706 in Milltownbratton and meets the River Moyle. The Anner passes under the Limerick–Rosslare railway line and then the N24 near Twomilebridge, draining into the Suir at Killaloan Lower.

== Wildlife ==
The River Anner is a noted salmon and trout fishery.

== Literature ==
The river is memorialised in a Charles Kickham poem, "She lived beside the Anner at the foot of Slievenamon".

== See also ==
- Rivers of Ireland
