= Ballysloe =

Settlement in County Tipperary, Ireland

Coordinates: 52°38′N 7°36′W

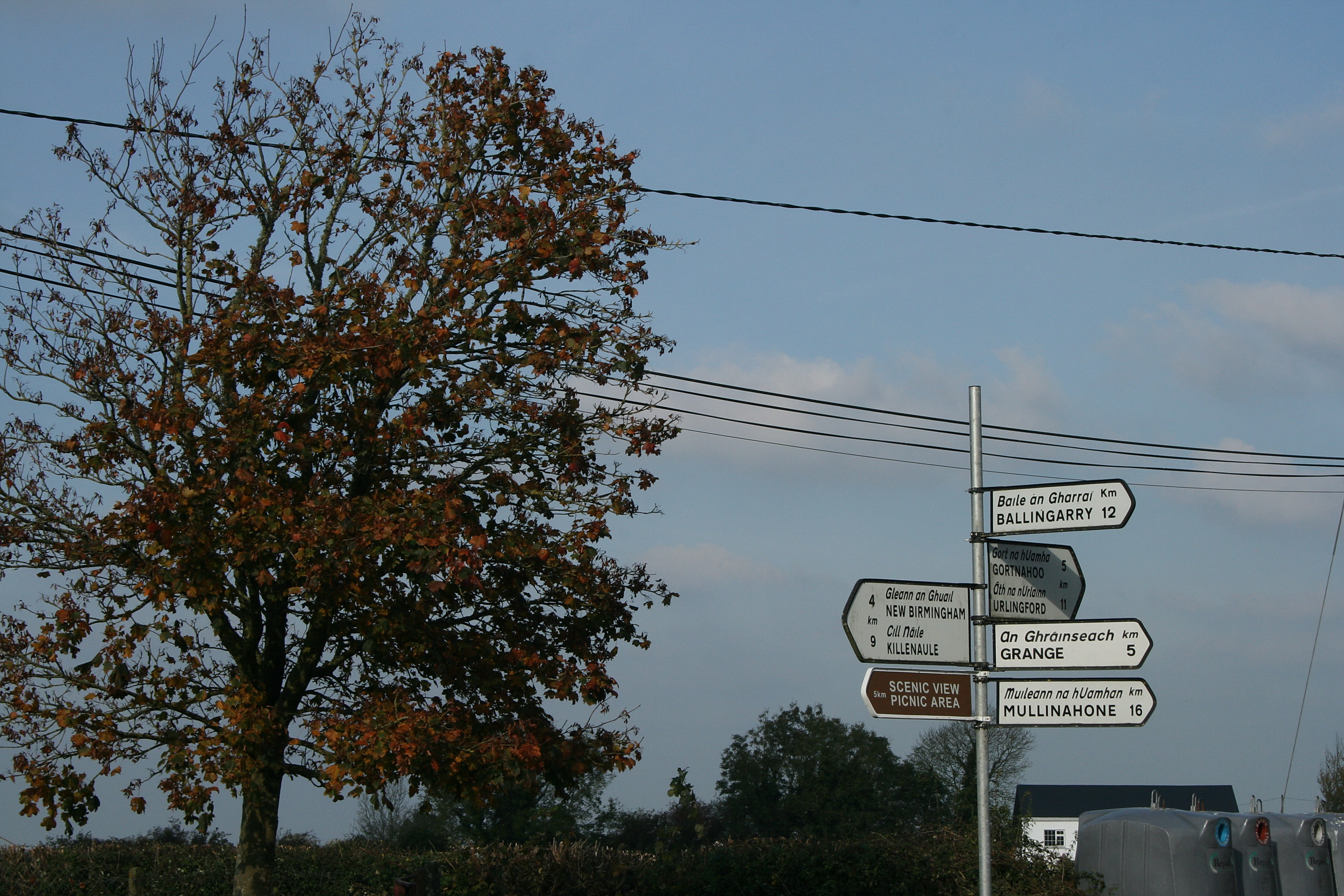
Main Street, the R689

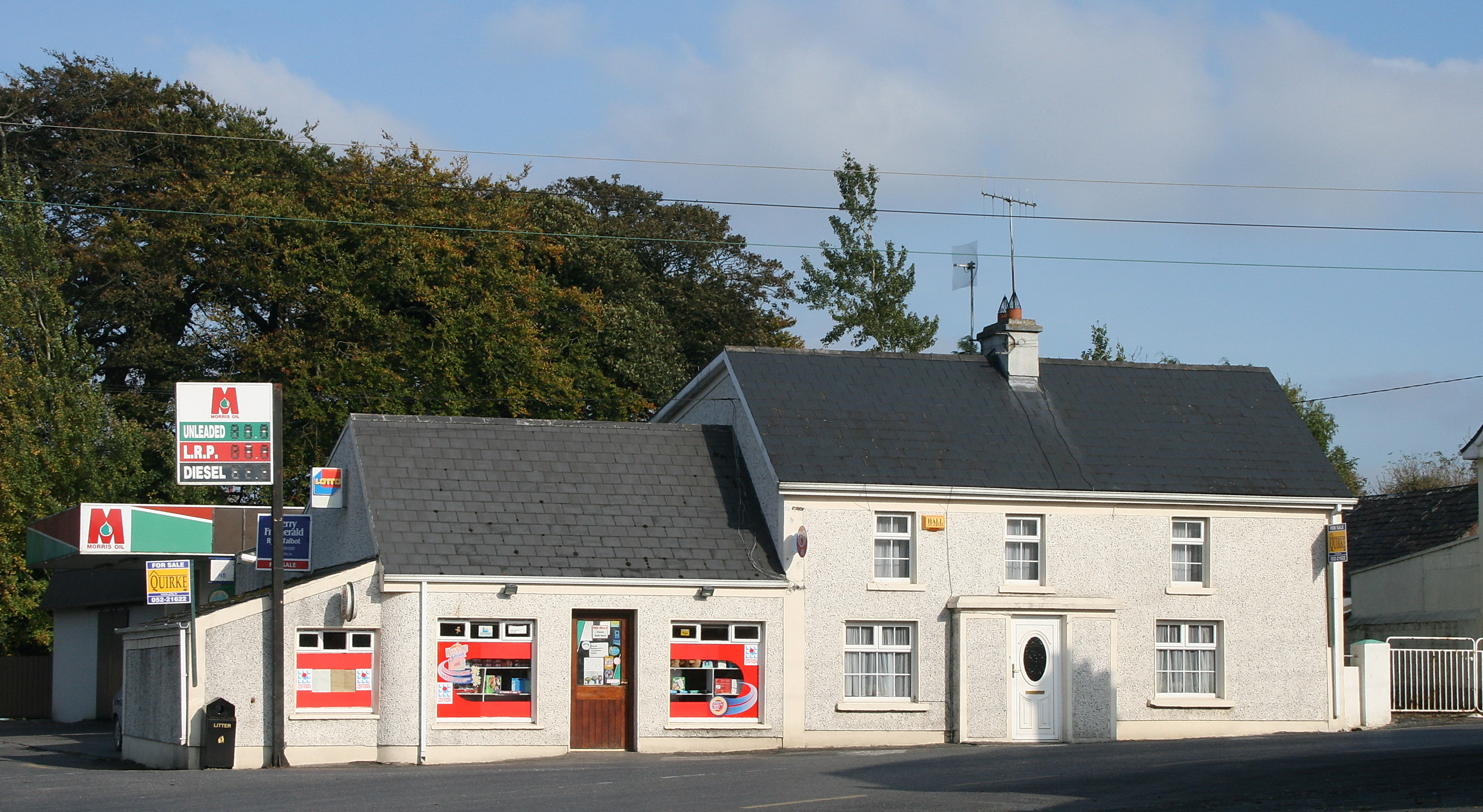
Ballysloe

Ballysloe is a townland on the R689 regional road in County Tipperary. It is located 10 km (6.2 mi) south of Urlingford, County Kilkenny.
