= Gottfried Helnwein =

Austrian–Irish visual artist (born 1948)

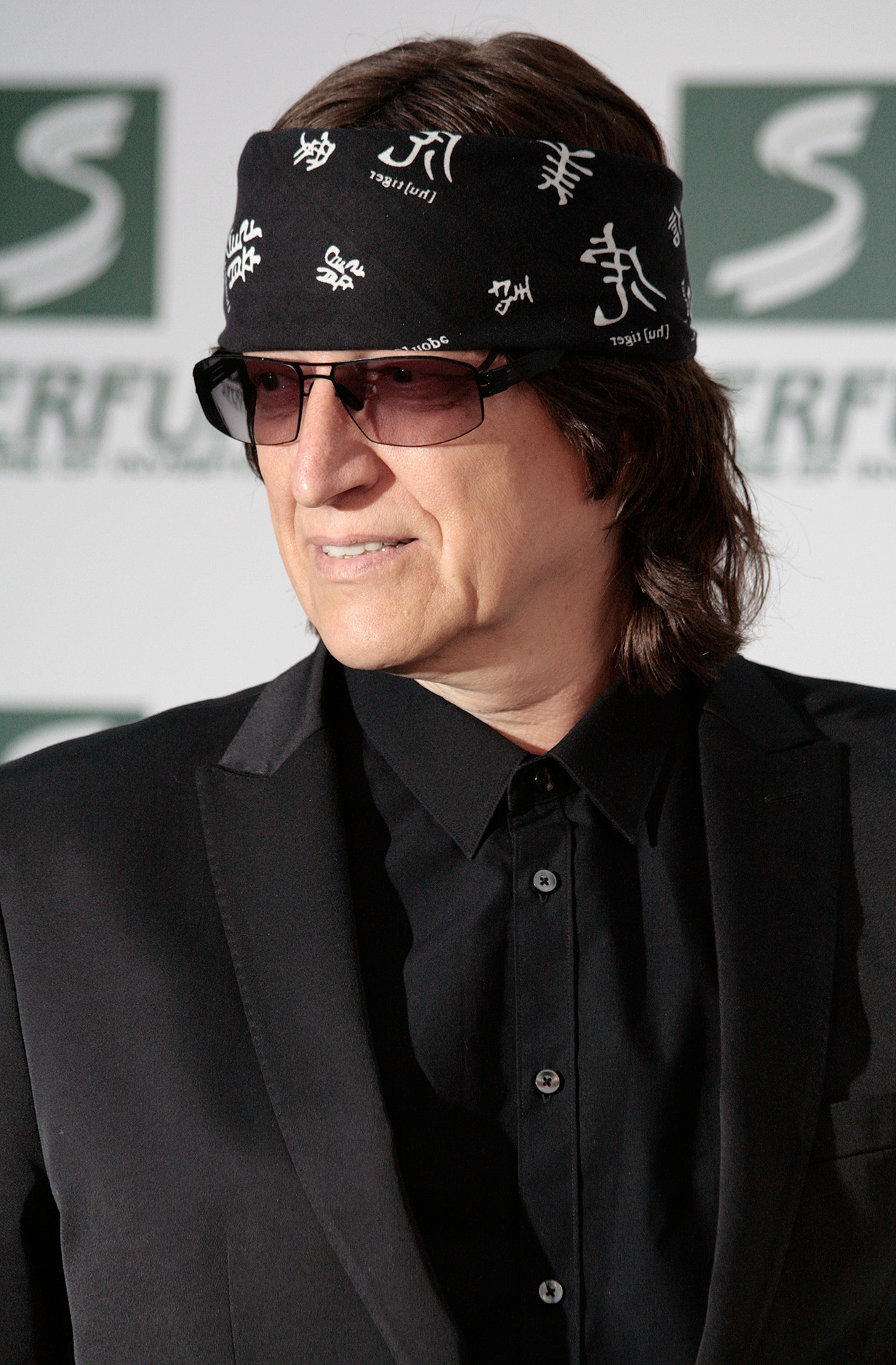
- Helnwein in 2009
- Born: 8 October 1948 (age 78); Vienna, Austria
- Education: Academy of Fine Arts Vienna
- Known for: painting, photography, installation art
- Notable work: Ninth November Night (1988), Epiphany I (Adoration of the Magi) (1996), Disasters of War 3 (2007), The Murmur of the Innocents 14 (2010), I Walk Alone (2003), Peinlich (1971)
- Movement: Hyperrealism, installation art, performance art

Gottfried Helnwein (born 8 October 1948) is an Austrian-Irish visual artist. He has worked as a painter, draftsman, photographer, muralist, sculptor, installation and performance artist, using a wide variety of techniques and media.

His work is concerned primarily with psychological and sociological anxiety, historical issues and political topics. His subject matter is the human condition. The metaphor for his art is dominated by the image of the child, particularly the wounded child, scarred physically and emotionally from within. His works often reference taboo and controversial issues from recent history, especially the Nazi rule and the Holocaust. As a result, his work is often considered provocative and controversial.

Helnwein has produced artworks for rock bands the Rolling Stones, Scorpions and Rammstein. He has also partnered with Marilyn Manson in the production of The Golden Age of Grotesque and other projects.

Helnwein studied at the University of Visual Art in Vienna. He lives and works in Ireland, where he owns the Castle Gurteen de la Poer, and Los Angeles.

== Life ==
Helnwein was born in Vienna shortly after World War II. His father Joseph Helnwein worked for the Austrian Post and Telegraphy administration (Österreichische Post- und Telegraphenverwaltung), and his mother Margarethe was a housewife.

He has four children with his wife Renate: Cyril, Mercedes, Ali Elvis and Wolfgang Amadeus, all of whom are artists. He also has three grandchildren. In 2004, Helnwein received Irish citizenship.

=== Career and education ===
Helnwein had a strict Roman Catholic upbringing. As a student he organized plays and art exhibitions at the Catholic Marian Society of the Jesuit University Church in Vienna. In 1965, he enrolled at the Higher Federal Institution for Graphic Education and Experimentation. In the following years, he started his first performances for small audiences where he cut his face and hands with razor blades and bandaged himself.

From 1969 to 1973, he studied at the University of Visual Art in Vienna. He was awarded a Master-class prize (Meisterschulpreis) of the University of Visual Art, Vienna, the Kardinal-König prize and the Theodor-Körner prize.

Helnwein was offered a chair by the Hamburg University of Applied Sciences in 1982. When his demand to admit also children to study at the university was rejected, he declined. In 1983, Helnwein met Andy Warhol in his Factory in New York City, who posed for a series of photo-sessions. In 1985, Rudolf Hausner recommended Helnwein as his successor as professor of the master-class for painting at the University of Visual Art in Vienna, but Helnwein left Vienna and moved to Germany.

Helnwein bought a medieval castle close to Cologne and the Rhine-river. Four years later, in 1989, he established a studio in Tribeca, New York, and thenceforth spent his time between the United States and Germany.

Helnwein moved to Dublin, Ireland, in 1997 and one year later he bought the Castle Gurteen de la Poer in County Waterford. In 2002, he established a studio in downtown Los Angeles and he lives and works since then in Ireland and Los Angeles.

On 3 December 2005, Helnwein served as best man at the wedding of his friend Marilyn Manson and Dita Von Teese, in a private, non-denominational ceremony at Helnwein's castle. The wedding was officiated by surrealist film director Alejandro Jodorowsky

In 2013, the Albertina Museum in Vienna organized a retrospective of Helnwein's work. The show was seen by 250,000 visitors and was the most successful exhibition of a contemporary artist in the history of the Albertina.

== Notable works ==
Helnwein is part of a tradition going back to the 18th century, to which Messerschmidt's grimacing sculptures belong. One sees, too, the common ground of his works with those of Arnulf Rainer and Hermann Nitsch, two other Viennese, who display their own bodies in the frame of reference of injury, pain, and death. And one sees how this fascination with body language goes back to the expressive gesture in the work of Egon Schiele.

=== The Child ===
State Russian Museum St. Petersburg, Helnwein's Head of a Child ("Kindskopf", 1991, oil and acrylic on canvas, 600 x 400 cm), being installed in the retrospective of Gottfried Helnwein, 1997, (Collection of the State Russian Museum St. Petersburg)

Helnwein's early work consists mainly of hyperrealistic watercolors, depicting wounded children, as well as photographs and performances – often with children – in public spaces. The bandaged child became the most important figure next to the artist himself allied with him in his actions: the embodiment of the innocent, defenceless individual at the mercy of brute force.

Art historian Peter Gorsen specified the relation between Helnwein's work and Viennese Actionism.

In 2004, The Fine Arts Museums of San Francisco organized the first one-person exhibition of Gottfried Helnwein at an American Museum: "The Child, works by Gottfried Helnwein" at the California Palace of the Legion of Honor.

The show was seen by almost 130,000 visitors and the San Francisco Chronicle quoted it the most important exhibition of a contemporary artist in 2004. Steven Winn, Chronicle Arts and Culture critic, wrote: "Helnwein's large format, photo-realist images of children of various demeanors boldly probed the subconscious. Innocence, sexuality, victimization and haunting self-possession surge and flicker in Helnwein's unnerving work".

=== Self portraits ===
Cover art to Blackout (1982)

At the same time when Helnwein painted watercolors of injured and abused children, from 1969, around 1970/71 he also began a series of self-portrayals in photographs and performances (actions) in his studio and in the streets of Vienna. Actionistic self-portrayals in the manner of a happening featuring his injured and bandaged body and surgical instruments deforming his face go back to Helnwein's student days. Since then, bandages have become part of the aesthetic "uniform" of his self-portraits.

The artist exposed himself as victim and martyr: bandages around his head and forks and surgical instruments piercing his mouth or cheek. Frequently the distortions of these tormented images make it difficult to recognize Helnwein's face. He appears as a screaming man, mirroring the frightening aspects of life: a twentieth-century Man of Sorrows. His frozen cry, showing the artist in a state of implacable trauma, recalls Edvard Munch's Scream and Francis Bacon's screaming popes. Some of Helnwein's grimacing faces also recall the grotesque physiognomic distortions by the eighteenth-century Viennese sculptor Franz Xavier Messerschmidt. They could also be seen as part of the Austrian pictorial tradition that resurfaced in the perturbed and distorted expressionist faces painted by Kokoschka and Egon Schiele before World War I, reappearing in the exaggerated mimicry in Arnulf Rainer's "Face Farces".

William S. Burroughs commented on Helnwein's self-portraits in an essay in 1992:

There is a basic misconception that any given face, at any given time, looks more or less the same, like a statue's face. Actually, the human face is as variable from moment to moment as a screen on which images are reflected, from within and from without. Gottfried Helnwein's paintings and photographs attack this misconception, showing the variety of faces of which any face is capable. And in order to attack the basic misconception, he must underline and exaggerate by distortion, by bandages and metal instruments that force the face into impossible molds. Images of torture and madness abound, as happens from moment to moment in the face seen as a sensitive reflection of extreme perceptions and experience. How can a self-portrait depict statuesque calm in the face of the horrors that surround us all?

In a conversation with Robert A. Sobieszek, curator of the Los Angeles County Museum of Art, Helnwein declared: "The reason why I took up the subject of self-portraits and why I have put myself on stage was to function as a kind of representative for the suffering, abused and oppressed human being. I needed a living body to demonstrate and exemplify the effect of violence inflicted upon a defenseless victim. There is nothing autobiographical or therapeutical about it, and I don't think it says anything about me personally. Also I was the best possible model for my experiments: endlessly patient and always available."

=== Comics and trivial art ===
Another strong element in his works are comics. Helnwein has sensed the superiority of cartoon life over real life ever since he was a child. Growing up in a dreary, destroyed post-war Vienna, the young boy was surrounded by unsmiling people, haunted by a recent past they could never speak about. What changed his life was the first German-language Donald Duck comic book that his father brought home one day. Opening the book felt like finally arriving in a world where he belonged: "a decent world where one could get flattened by steam-rollers and perforated by bullets without serious harm. A world in which the people still looked proper, with yellow beaks or black knobs instead of noses."

In 2000, the San Francisco Museum of Modern Art presented Helnwein's painting "Mouse I" (1995, oil and acrylic on canvas, 210 cm x 310 cm) at the exhibition The Darker Side of Playland: Childhood Imagery from the Logan Collection.

Alicia Miller commented on Helnwein's work in Artweek: "In 'The Darker Side of Playland', the endearing cuteness of beloved toys and cartoon characters turns menacing and monstrous. Much of the work has the quality of childhood nightmares. In those dreams, long before any adult understanding of the specific pains and evils that live holds, the familiar and comforting objects and images of a child's world are rent with something untoward. For children, not understanding what really to be afraid of, these dreams portend some pain and disturbance lurking into the landscape. Perhaps nothing in the exhibition exemplifies this better than Gottfried Helnwein's 'Mickey'. His portrait of Disney's favorite mouse occupies an entire wall of the gallery; rendered from an oblique angle, his jaunty, ingenuous visage looks somehow sneaky and suspicious. His broad smile, encasing a row of gleaming teeth, seems more a snarl or leer. This is Mickey as Mr. Hyde, his hidden other self now disturbingly revealed.Helnwein's Mickey is painted in shades of gray, as if pictured on an old black-and-white TV set. We are meant to be transported to the flickering edges of our own childhood memories in a time imaginably more blameless, crime-less and guiltless. But Mickey's terrifying demeanor hints of things to come...".

Since 2018 the work 'Dark Mousse' can be visited at Colección SOLO museum in Madrid, where it is part of its permanent exhibition.

Although Helnwein's work is rooted in the legacy of German expressionism, he has absorbed elements of American pop culture. In the 1970s, he began to include cartoon characters in his paintings. In several interviews he claimed: "I learned more from Donald Duck than from all the schools that I have ever attended." Commenting on that aspect in Helnwein's work, Julia Pascal wrote in the New Statesman: "His early watercolor Peinlich (Embarrassing) shows a typical little 1950s girl in a pink dress and carrying a comic book. Her innocent appeal is destroyed by the gash deforming her cheek and lips. It is as if Donald Duck had met Mengele".

Living between Los Angeles and Ireland, Helnwein met and photographed the Rolling Stones in London, and his portrait of John F. Kennedy made the cover of Time magazine on the 20th anniversary of the president's assassination. His self-portrait as screaming bandaged man, blinded by forks (1982) became the cover of the Scorpions album Blackout. Andy Warhol, Muhammad Ali, Burroughs and the German industrial metal band Rammstein posed for him; some of his art-works appeared in the cover-booklet of Michael Jackson's History album. Referring to the fall of the Berlin Wall Helnwein created the book Some Facts about Myself, together with Marlene Dietrich. In 2003 he became friends with Marilyn Manson and started a collaboration with him on the multi-media art-project The Golden Age of Grotesque and on several experimental video-projects. Among his widely published works is a spoof of the famous Edward Hopper painting Nighthawks, entitled Boulevard of Broken Dreams, depicting Elvis Presley, Marilyn Monroe, James Dean and Humphrey Bogart. This painting in turn inspired the song of the same name by Green Day.

Examining his imagery from the 1970s to the present, one sees influences as diverse as Bosch, Goya, John Heartfield, Beuys and Mickey Mouse, all filtered through a postwar Viennese childhood. 'Helnwein's oeuvre embraces total antipodes: The trivial alternates with visions of spiritual doom, the divine in the child contrasts with horror-images of child-abuse. But violence remains to be his basic theme – the physical and the emotional suffering, inflicted by one human being unto another.'

=== References to the Holocaust ===
Gottfried Helnwein, Epiphany I (Adoration of the Magi), mixed media on canvas, 1996

In 1988, in remembrance of the Night of the Broken Glass (Kristallnacht), which had happened 50 years earlier, Helnwein erected a large installation in the city center of Cologne, between Museum Ludwig and the Cologne Cathedral: Selektion – Neunter November Nacht ("Selektion – Ninth November Night). The gallery featured a four-meter-high, hundred-meter-long picture lane in which the artist recalls the events of Reichskristallnacht, often taken to be the beginning of the Holocaust, on November 9 1938. He confronts the passersby with larger-than-life children's faces lined up in a seemingly endless row, as if for concentration camp selection. Just days into the exhibit, these portraits were vandalized by unknown persons, symbolically cutting the throats of the depicted children's faces. Helnwein consciously left the panels with the gashes and included them in the presentation, as he believed that they made the work stronger and more relevant.

Mitchell Waxman wrote 2004, in The Jewish Journal, Los Angeles: "The most powerful images that deal with Nazism and Holocaust themes are by Anselm Kiefer and Helnwein, although, Kiefer's work differs considerably from Helnwein's in his concern with the effect of German aggression on the national psyche and the complexities of German cultural heritage. Kiefer is known for evocative and soulful images of barren German landscapes. But Kiefer and Helnwein's work are both informed by the personal experience of growing up in a post-war German speaking country. Burroughs said that the American revolution begins in books and music, and political operatives implement the changes after the fact. To this maybe we can add art. And Helnwein's art might have the capacity to instigate change by piercing the veil of political correctness to recapture the primitive gesture inherent in art.".

One of the best known paintings of Helnwein's oeuvre is Epiphany I – Adoration of the Magi, (1996, oil and acrylic on canvas, 210 cm x 333 cm, collection of the Denver Art Museum). It is part of a series of three paintings: Epiphany I, Epiphany II (Adoration of the Shepherds), Epiphany III (Presentation at the Temple), created between 1996 and 1998. In Epiphany I, SS officers surround a mother and child group. To judge by their looks and gestures, they appear to be interested in details such as head, face, back and genitals. The arrangement of the figures clearly relates to motive and iconography of the adoration of the three Magi, such as were common especially in the German, Italian and Dutch 15th century artworks. Julia Pascal wrote about this work in the New Statesman: "This Austrian Catholic Nativity scene has no Magi bearing gifts. Madonna and child are encircled by five respectful Waffen SS officers palpably in awe of the idealised, blonde Virgin. The Christ toddler, who stands on Mary's lap, stares defiantly out of the canvas." Helnwein's baby Jesus is often considered to represent Adolf Hitler.

== Publications ==
- Helnwein. Retrospective at the Albertina Museum Vienna, Hatje Cantz, 2013 Klaus Albrecht Schröder, Elsy Lahner, Howard N. Fox, Siegfried Mattl. ISBN 978-3-7757-3584-1.
- The Child, Works by Gottfried Helnwein. One man exhibition 2004, San Francisco Fine Arts Museums. Robert Flynn Johnson, Harry S. Parker, Robert Flynn Johnson, The Child – Works by Gottfried Helnwein. ISBN 978-0-88401-112-5)
- Face it, Works by Gottfried Helnwein. One man exhibition 2006, Lentos Museum of Modern Art Linz. Stella Rollig, Thomas Edlinger, Nava Semel, Stella Rollig, Presence and Time: Gottfried Helnwein's Pictures. Christian Brandstätter, Wien 2006. ISBN 978-3-902510-39-6.
- Angels Sleeping – Retrospective Gottfried Helnwein. Retrospective 2004, Rudolfinum Gallery Prague. Peter Nedoma, 2008. Essay. ISBN 978-80-86443-11-9.
- Gottfried Helnwein – Monograph. Retrospective 1997, State Russian Museum St. Petersburg. Alexander Borovsky, Klaus Honnef, Peter Selz, William Burroughs, Heiner Müller, H.C. Artmann, Klaus Honnef, Helnwein – The Subversive Power of Art. Palace Edition 1997, ISBN 978-3-930775-31-6. Koenemann 1999, ISBN 978-3-8290-1448-9.
- Helnwein – Ninth November Night. 2003. Documentary, Commemoration of the 65th Anniversary of Kristallnacht, Museum of Tolerance, Simon Wiesenthal Center, Los Angeles. Johnathon Keats, Simon Wiesenthal, Johnathon Keats, Helnwein – The Art of Humanity

== See also ==
- Shock art
