= Irish measure =

Units of land measurement used in Ireland

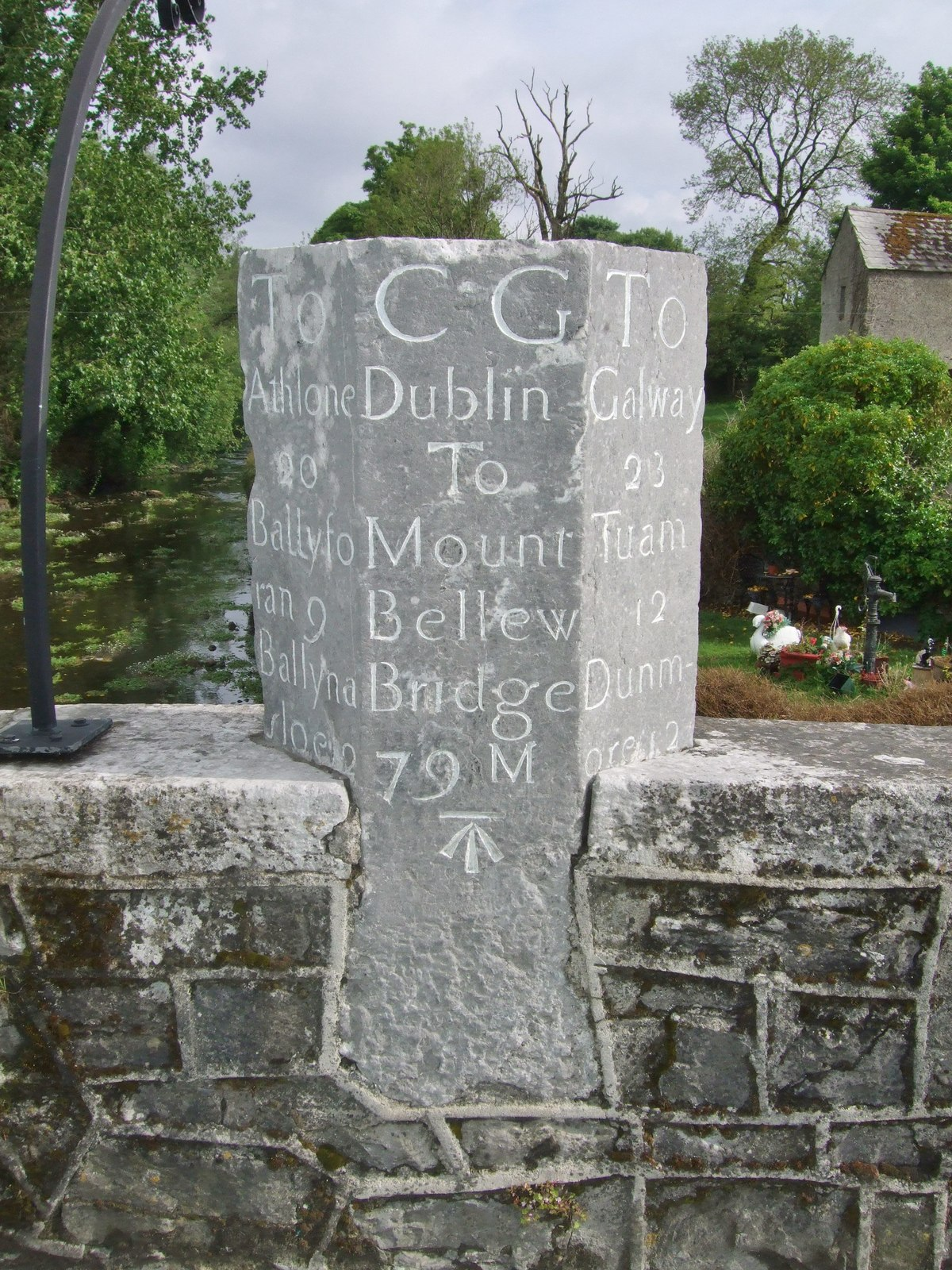
Milestone on Mountbellew Bridge, originally erected near by c.1760. Distances are given in Irish miles to: Dublin (79); Athlone (20) Ballyforan (9) Ballinasloe (2); Galway (23) Tuam (12) Dunmore (2)

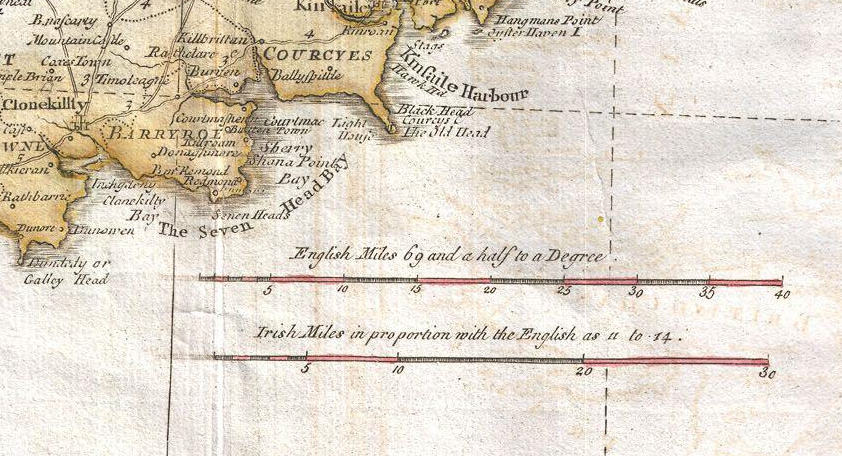
Detail of John Rocque's 1794 map of Ireland showing scales of English and Irish miles

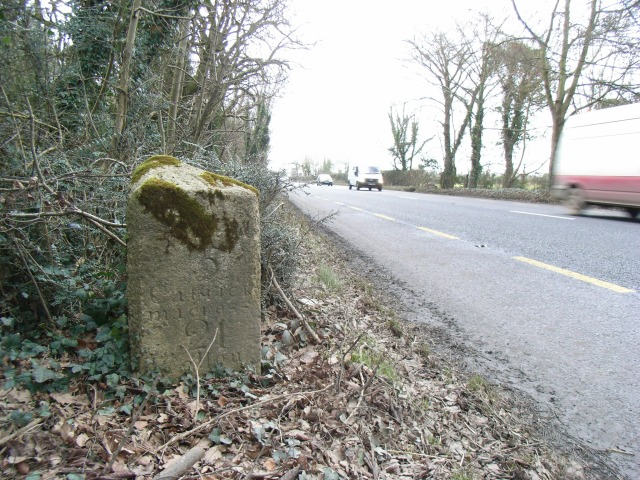
Milestone on the N2 road reading: Slane 5, Carrickmacross 21 and Collon 9 (Irish) miles. In modern statute miles this would be 6 1/3, 30 3/4 and 11 1/2 miles respectively.

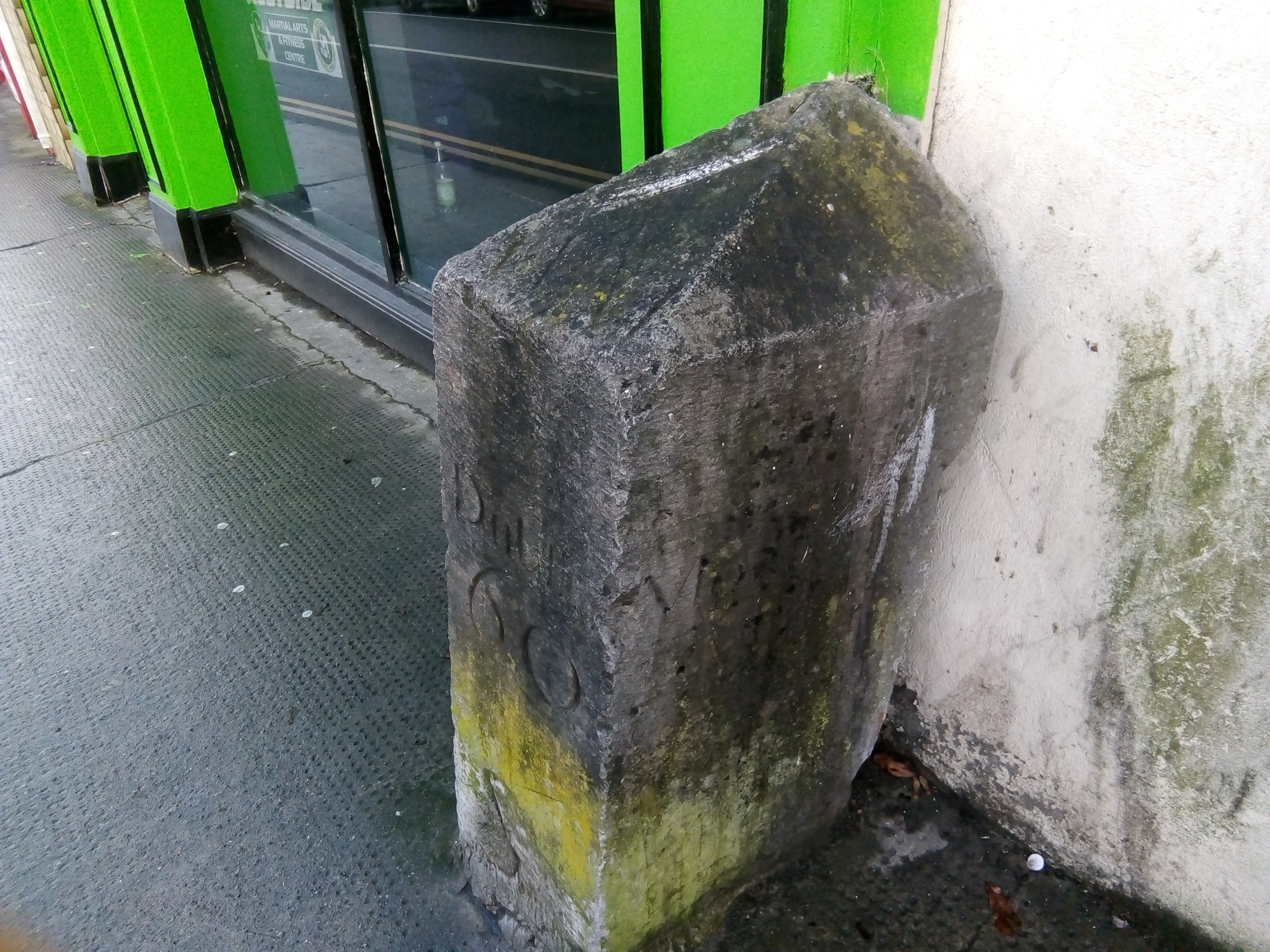
Milestone in Athlone, indicating a distance of 60 Irish miles to Dublin. This is equivalent to 76 statute miles or 122 kilometres.

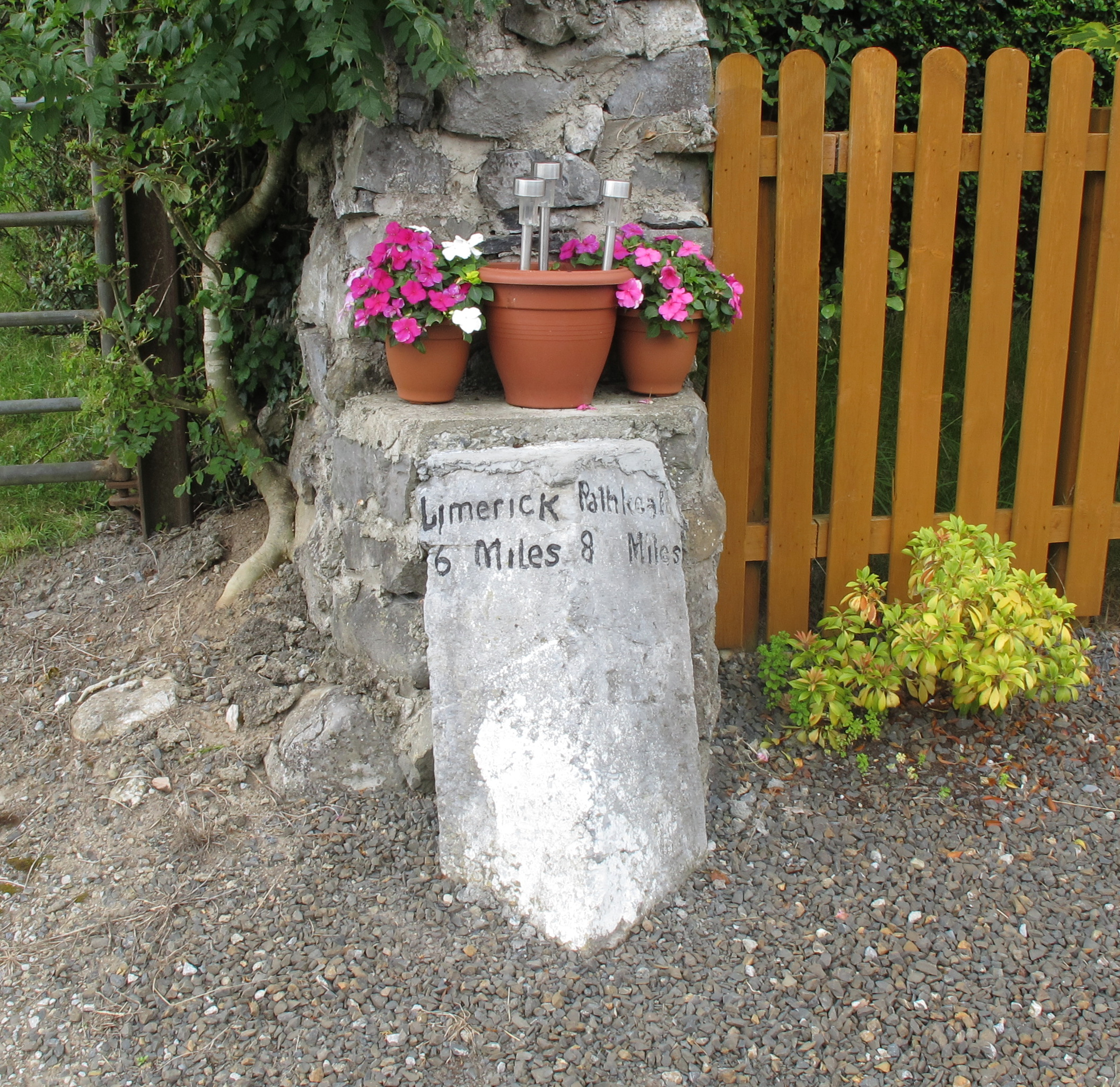
Milestone at Ballycarrane, stating that it is 8 Irish miles (16 km) to Rathkeale and 6 Irish miles (12 km) to Limerick.

Irish measure or plantation measure was a system of units of land measurement used in Ireland from the 16th century plantations until the 19th century, with residual use into the 20th century. The units were based on "English measure" but used a linear perch measuring 7 yards (6.4 m) as opposed to the English rod of 5.5 yards (5.0 m). Thus, linear units such as the furlong and mile, which were defined in terms of perches, were longer by a factor of 14:11 (~27% more) in Irish measure, while units of area, such as the rood or acre, were larger by 196:121 (~62% more). The Weights and Measures Act 1824 (5 Geo. 4. c. 74) mandated the use throughout the British Empire of "Imperial measure", also called "statute measure", based on English measure. Imperial measure soon replaced Irish measure in the use of the Dublin Castle administration, but Irish measure persisted in local government, and longer still in private use.

== History ==
The size of the mile and acre are derived from the length of the surveyor's rod, a unit which in Ireland was called a perch (or linear perch to distinguish it from the square perch). A mile is 320 linear perches and an acre is 160 square perches. The length of the perch was not standardised nationwide at the time of the Tudor conquest of Ireland; the city walls of Cork used a 29-foot perch. The 21-foot perch which became standard in Ireland during the Plantations was found elsewhere; in 1820 it was reportedly used for linear measure in Guernsey, and for measuring fencing in Herefordshire and "labourer's work" in South Wales.

English measure was sometimes used in the Kingdom of Ireland. The Plantation of Munster of the 1580s used the English acre. In 1642 the Adventurers' Act, to compensate those who funded the army that put down the 1641 rebellion with land confiscated from rebels, specified amounts in "English measure", but was quickly amended to "Plantation measure". The "mile line" of the 1652 Cromwellian settlement, prohibiting Catholics settling within a mile of the Connacht coast or River Shannon, was an English statute mile. (Note: The original limit was four miles under the Act of Satisfaction 1653, passed by Barebone's Parliament to expand the Act for the Settlement of Ireland 1652. The limit was reduced to one mile under the Act of Settlement 1657.) A 1653 survey of lands of the Countess of Ormonde in County Kilkenny used statute acres, whereas the 1654–5 Civil Survey and 1655–6 Down Survey used plantation acres. Irish acres were used in the 1823–37 applotments made under the Composition for Tithes (Ireland) Act 1823. A third system, "Scotch measure" or "Cunningham measure", was also used in Ulster Scots areas.

Many 18th-century statutes of the Parliament of Ireland specified distances without specifying Irish or English measure, which led to confusion and disputes. From 1774 until the 1820s, the grand juries of 25 Irish counties commissioned maps at scales of one or two inches per Irish mile but the County Mayo maps (1809–1830) were surveyed and drawn by William Bald in English miles and just rescaled to Irish miles for printing. The Ordnance Survey of Ireland, from its establishment in 1824, used English miles. Thomas Telford's Howth–Dublin Post Office extension of the London–Holyhead turnpike had its mileposts in English miles. Irish measure was formally abolished by the 1824 Weights and Measures Act but the Irish Post Office continued to use the measure until 1856. An 1800 act fixed the maximum penalty for burning land at 10 pounds per "Irish plantation acre"; in 1846 a fine of 70 pounds was overturned in Queen's Bench as exceeding this limit: although the evidence related to seven Irish acres, the form of conviction "seven acres" must legally have referred to statute acres. In two 1847 parliamentary returns of distances between Irish towns, values were in Irish miles for some counties and statute miles for others. In 1878 the High Court of Justice in Ireland ruled that, unless "Irish acres" is explicitly specified, the word "acres" in a will must be interpreted as statute acres, notwithstanding external evidence that the opposite was intended.

Several post-1824 statutes used Irish measure when repeating the text of a pre-1824 statute being replaced or amended. The Lighting of Towns (Ireland) Act 1828 allowed those residing within one Irish mile of a town market to vote on whether to establish town commissioners. The Parliamentary Boundaries (Ireland) Act 1832 defined the radius of Sligo as "One Mile, Irish Admeasurement, from ... the Market Cross"; the same as the boundary established for local taxation purposes in 1803. The Fever Hospitals (Ireland) Act 1834 allowed certain tenants to demise up to "six roods, plantation measure" to a fever hospital. The Grand Jury (Ireland) Act 1836 allowed grand juries to allocate up to "two plantation acres" for a Church of Ireland diocesan school. The Church of Ireland Act 1851 allowed a chapel of ease to be built on certain types of plot of up to "One Acre Plantation Measure".

== Irish mile ==
The Irish mile (míle or míle Gaelach) as latterly defined measured exactly 8 Irish furlongs, 320 Irish perches, or 2240 yards: approximately 1.27 statute miles or 2.048 kilometres. During the Elizabethan era, 4 Irish miles were generally equated to 5 English ones although whether this meant the old English mile or the shorter statute mile is unclear. Limerick's 1609 charter specified a three-mile radius for the county of the city; since the actual distance (four to five statute miles) exceeds three standard Irish miles Brian Hodkinson suggests "a peculiarly Limerick mile" was used. The 21-foot perch was in use by 1609 for the Plantation of Ulster. The 2240-yard mile was specified in Irish statutes of 1755 and 1786; however, a 1715 Irish statute defines the fare for ferries in terms of "common Irish miles: (that is to say) at one English mile and an half or twelve furlongs at least to each mile".

Prior to the publication of standardised traffic regulations by the Irish Free State in 1926, signage varied from county to county, prompting complaints from travellers such as Alfred Austin. In 1902, the Royal Road Book of Ireland explained that "Counties Dublin, Waterford, Cork, Antrim, Down, and Armagh use English, but Donegal Irish Miles; the other counties either have both, or only one or two roads have Irish". The 1909 "Thorough" Guide said, "The Railway Companies adopt English miles. The [horse] car proprietors are apt to be elastic in their choice. The Counties of Dublin, Waterford, Cork, Antrim, and Armagh use English milestones, Donegal uses Irish only, and the other counties either have both or a mixture. Metal milestones, however, show English, and stone ones Irish, miles." The Oxford English Dictionary's 1906 definition of "mile" described the Irish mile as "still in rustic use".

The Irish Free State standardised its roads using English statute miles, leading to some nationalist complaints. In 1937, a man being prosecuted for driving outside the 15-mile limit of his licence offered the unsuccessful defence that, since Ireland was independent, the limit should be reckoned by Irish miles "just as no one would ever think of selling land other than as Irish acres". In 1965, two deputies proposed an amendment to the Road Transport Act to replace the English statute miles with Irish ones; it was rejected. Such complaints—and the traditional distance itself—are now considered obsolete following Irish metrication from the 1970s; however, "an Irish mile" is still used colloquially to express a vague but long distance akin to a "country mile".

=== Placenames ===
Two-Mile Borris, County Tipperary is two Irish miles from Leighmore, site of a medieval monastery. Threemilehouse, County Monaghan is three Irish miles from Monaghan town. Fivemiletown, County Tyrone is five Irish miles equidistant from Clogher, Brookeborough and Tempo. Sixmilebridge, County Clare is six Irish miles from Thomondgate, Limerick. Sixmilecross, County Tyrone is six Irish miles from Omagh. The name of Six Mile Water, County Antrim is said to derive from the crossing point six Irish miles from Antrim town on the road to Carrickfergus. Ninemilehouse, County Tipperary, is nine Irish miles from Glenbower along the turnpike road.

== Irish acre ==
The Irish acre or plantation acre measured one Irish chain by one Irish furlong, or 4 Irish perches by 40, or 7840 square yards: approximately 0.66 hectares or 1.62 statute acres. The Lancashire acre around the Solway Firth and the Churchland acre in Yorkshire were the same size, which Frederic Seebohm in 1914 connected to the erw of Gwent in Wales. The Ordnance Survey of Ireland from its 1824 foundation used statute acres in its maps, which were used in turn for Griffith's Valuation and the census. The Irish acre remained common in Irish newspaper advertisements for farmland and other property until the middle of the 20th century.

In older Gaelic usage, a townland was notionally 60 or 120 "acres", but the size varied by the quality of the land. This unevenness was not sufficiently understood by English and Scottish planters, which caused disputes when confiscated land was divided and assigned. In Anglo-Norman Ireland, as in England of the time, "acre" sometimes meant any individual plot of land; as a standard measure, it was probably about 2.5 statute acres near Dublin, perhaps differing elsewhere. The Advertisements for Ireland of 1623 stated that the Irish acre varied by region from 1.25 to 8 English acres, while the Civil Survey of 1654 said that Irish surveys had measured only arable land, ignoring pasture, wood, bog, or wasteland. Of eleven townlands in Ireland named "Fortyacres" in 1901, six had areas between 60 and 78 statute acres; the smallest was 46 acres and the largest 185. The civil parish of Carn, County Wexford has townlands named Threeacres, Nineacres, and Nineteenacres, with respective areas of 12, 21, and 30 statute acres.

== Other Irish units ==
The Weights And Measures Commissioners' 1820 report included a list of regional terms in the United Kingdom and Channel Islands with their corresponding legal or customary values. Those noted in Ireland included:

- Gallon: defined as 217.6 cubic inches (3.566 L) by Irish statutes relating to beer and lime.
- Barrel: as in many regions, varied by content: 40 [Irish] gallons for "grain" and quicklime; 12 stone for malt; 14 stone for oats; 16 stone for barley; 20 stone for beans, peas, wheat, and potatoes.
- Stone: in Dublin was 15 pounds for rough tallow and 16 pounds for wool (instead of the standard 14 pounds).
- Load [of hay]: 4 "or more commonly 4 1/2" hundredweight in Dublin
