= Mullinahone =

Mullinahone Irish: Muileann na hUamhan
- Village
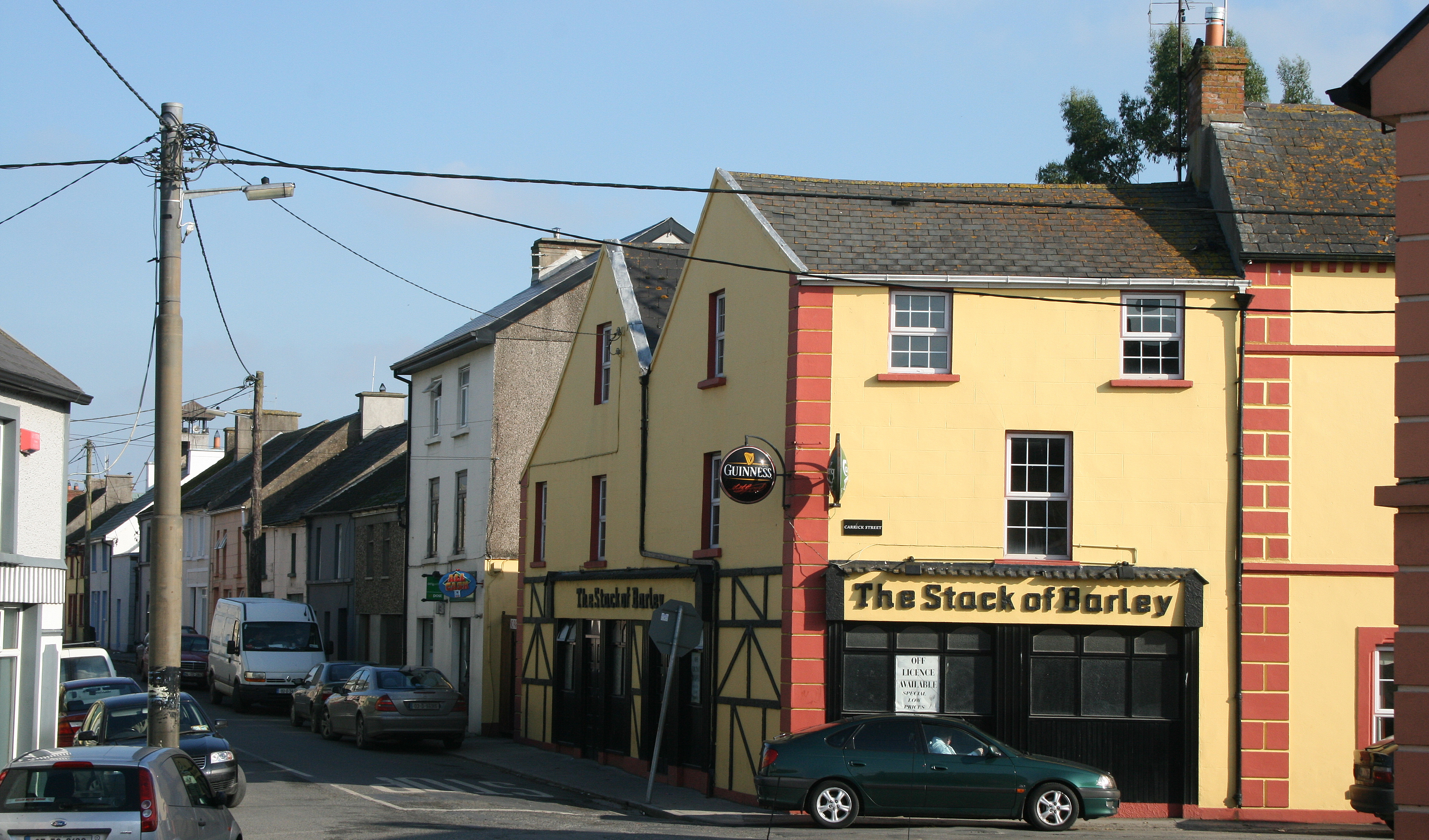
- Pub in Mullinahone

- Location in Ireland
- Coordinates: 52°30′43″N 7°30′22″W
- Country: Ireland
- Province: Munster
- County: Tipperary

Population (2016)
  - Total: 499

Mullinahone (Irish: Muileann na hUamhan, meaning 'Mill of the river, mill of the cave') is a village located in the barony of Slievardagh, County Tipperary in Ireland. It is also a parish in the Roman Catholic Archdiocese of Cashel and Emly. As of 2016, the village population was 499.

== Location and access ==
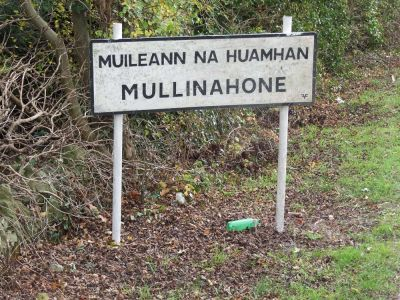
Signage on the road into Mullinahone

Mullinahone is situated roughly halfway between Clonmel and Kilkenny City, at the junction of the R690 and R692 roads. It is located in a low-lying broad valley area, for the most part, two to three hundred feet above sea level in South-East Tipperary. It reaches its highest point of 1,088 feet (332 m) on the mountain of Slievenamon, its southern boundary. The land, for the most part, is on a limestone base. This has 'karst' features, which means that it is fissured with many caves and underground streams, subjecting some areas to flooding in times of heavy rainfall.

Overlooking the northern boundary are the Slieveardagh hills and Ballingarry parish, while its western side is formed by some smaller hills such as Cappaghnagrane and Kilnagranagh and the parish of Drangan/Cloneen. To the east is Killamery (or Carrolls) hill together with a stretch of flat, often boggy land; its boundary with County Kilkenny county and Leinster. This modern parish is twenty-five square miles, area or 16,000 acres (65 km^{2}).

In an extended form this whole area was called "An Cuimseanach" or Compsey in pre-Norman times, an ancient Gaelic word suggesting an enclosed valley area. The barony of Slieveardagh, now the electoral area, was known as the barony of Slieveardagh/Compsey in Anglo-Norman times.

== History ==
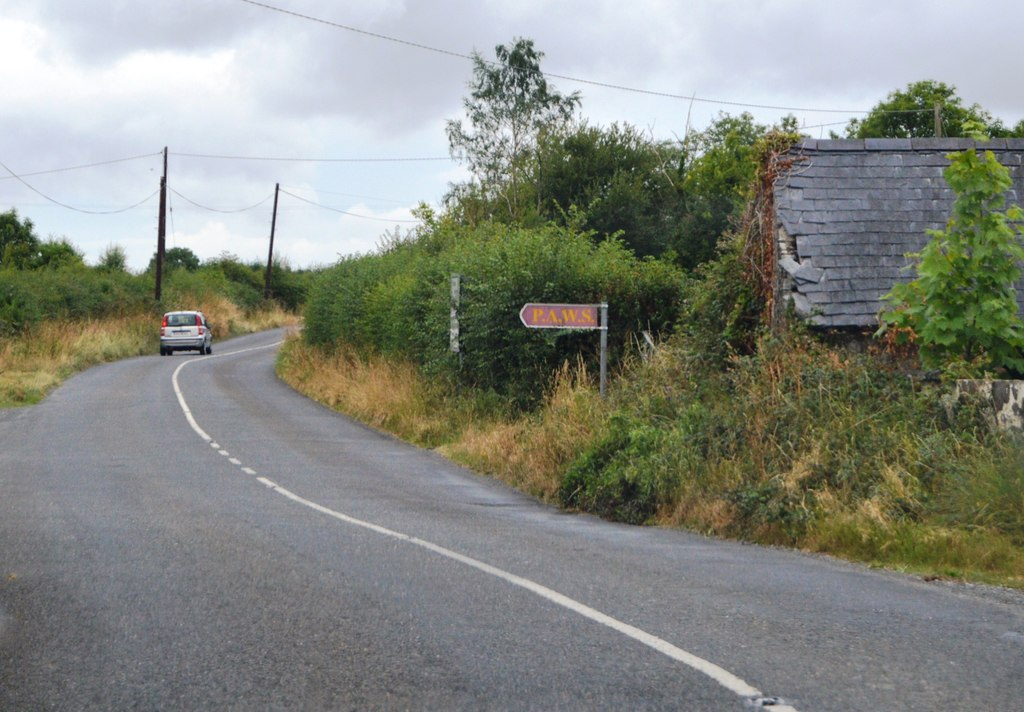
Mullinahone road.

The name of Mullinahone appears first as a settlement in the records of the "Hearth Money Rolls" in the years 1665 to 1667, then spelled as Moninehoan. The "Hearth Money Rolls" were a rent or tax on houses in the post-Cromwellian period. It was entered as a village or settled area of nine 'cabbins' with hearths, that is, permanent structures, which were not very common then, it appears after the wars of the time. Just across the river (a tributary of the River Anner) was the main village of Killaghy, in what is now Fethard and Killaghy streets. Both were extensions of the worker/artisan settlements of Killaghy Castle and lands whose estate walls adjoin the modern town today. Killaghy has existed since the first lord of Killaghy or Compsey, named St Aubyn or Tobin, built his castle there in the 13th century.

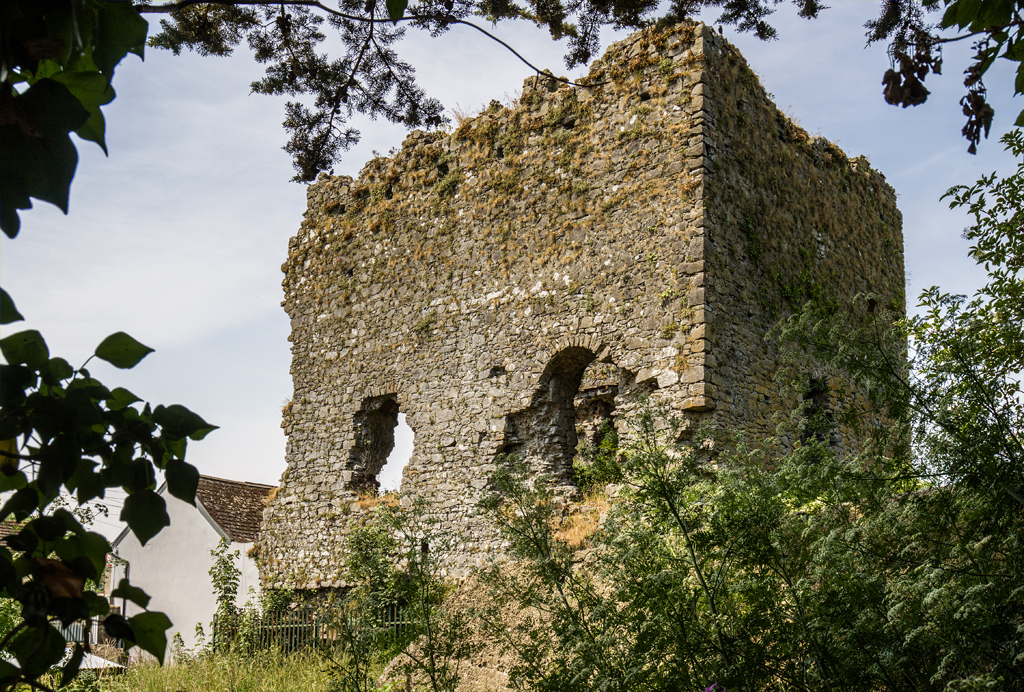
Castle ruin in Mullinahone

There is one earlier mention of Mullinahone as a place name. This is dated 1551 in the Calendar of Justiciary Rolls (State papers then), regarding Inquisitions or trials held there. This was possibly at the old 13th century Norman keep in present-day Carrick St in Mullinahone townland. The Lord of Compsey was James Tobin, who was then (1551) Justiciar of County Tipperary. The Tobins were a Norman family.

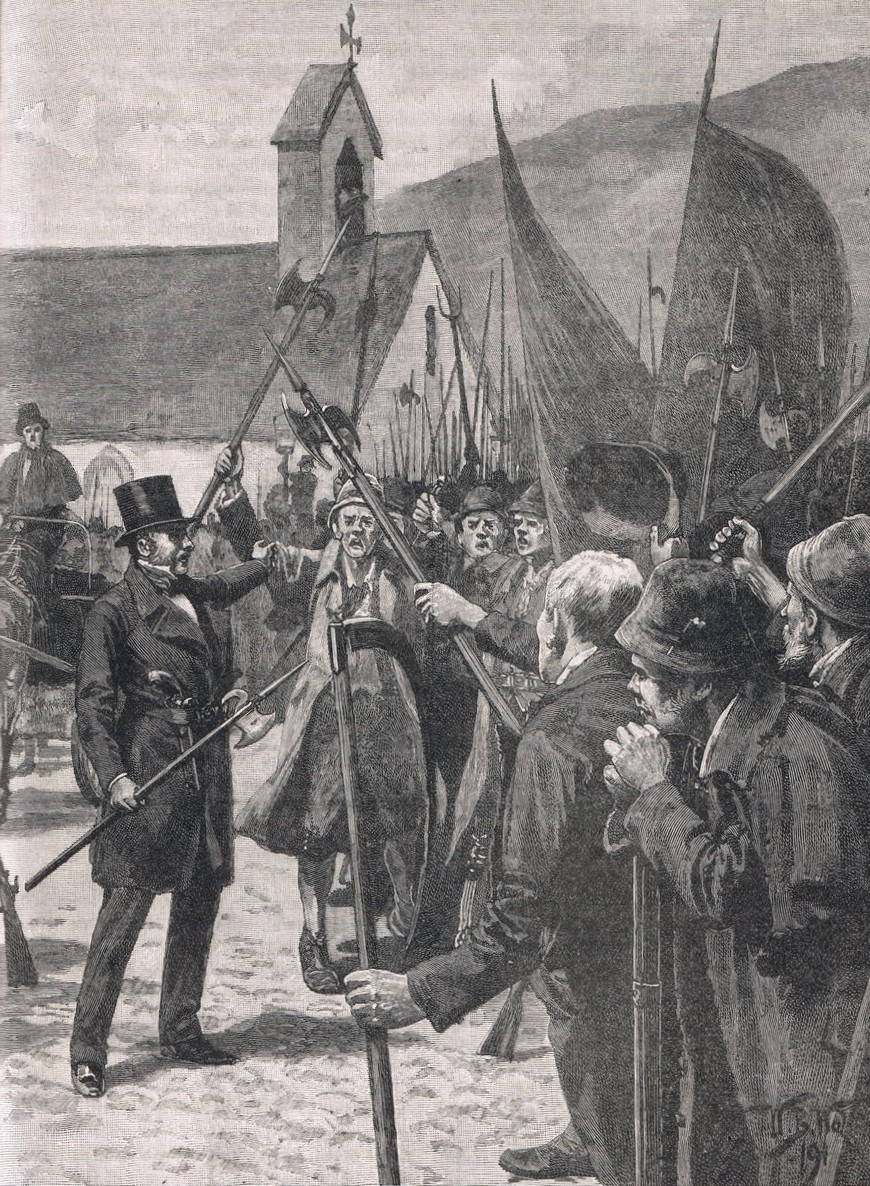
Young Ireland gathering in Mullinahone prior to the rebellion

=== Modern boundary ===
The modern parish was formed in the 18th century as the Catholic Church was re-organised when Penal Laws were relaxed. In 1772, it was joined with Drangan parish, and then in 1826, it was separated again. The old Gaelic entity of Compsey extended as far as Glenbower and Ahenny in Grangemockler parish and also part of Cloneen and adjoining areas.

Mullinahone was on one of the two routes from Ossory to Cashel or Leinster to Munster in medieval times. Known as the Pass of Compsey in Norman times, the passage was by Callan and Modeshill and crossed the river at Mullinahone at the ford of Aghmonenahone under the old Norman keep in Carrick St., then on the high road by Cappaghnagrane to Fethard and Cashel. It was then a heavily wooded area. One of the first Tobins was instructed to cut down the woods of Killaghy by royal decree to "ensure safe passage for travellers", i.e. the army and supplies.

=== Feudal period ===
In 1317, the Scottish army of Robert and Edward de Bruce came through here with much pillage. It took a week for them to get from Callan to Cashel.

Cromwell's troops attacked "ye States' expense" in 1654. The Tobin estates were broken up then, and most of the Tobin kinsmen were transplanted to Connacht.

The army of William of Orange camped near Mullinahone in 1691, and an order went out to 'burn the Compsey' as it was believed to harbour rapperees or highwaymen. The order was not carried out, however.

During the rebellion of 1798, there was an uprising on Carraigmoclear hill on Slievenamon, ending in defeat for the local men.

=== Great Famine ===
During the 1840s, the Great Famine caused many deaths in the parish, with perhaps a reduction of as much as 27% in population due to famine and emigration. Locally, there were attempts at physical force movements in 1848 and 1867, influenced by local writer and patriot Charles Kickham.

=== Land War ===
During the Land War in the 1880s, Mullinahone suffered considerably from an excess of landlordism. Tenant rights were achieved after the Government Land Acts were enacted.

The parish and its people were also involved in the War of Independence from 1919 to 1922. A monument in the village square was erected to the memory of those who lost their lives in this period.

== Places of interest ==
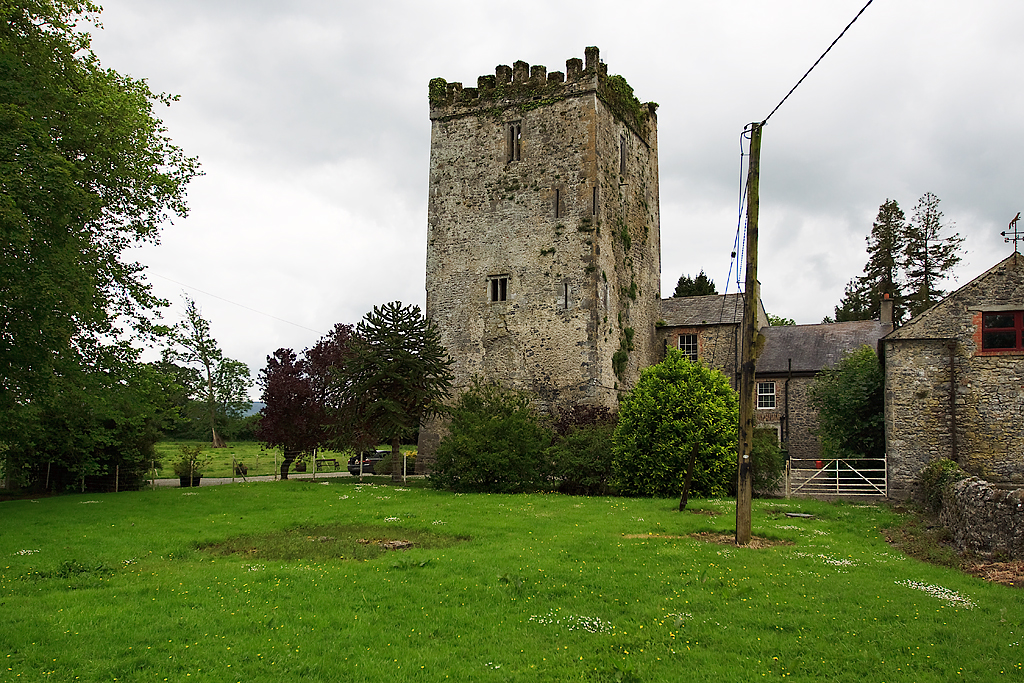
Killaghy Castle

Killaghy Castle, a Norman castle dating back to 1206, is a short distance from Mullinahone. It was originally a motte-and-bailey (a man-made hill of earth with a fortified wooden house on top). Later, in the 15th and 16th centuries, a tower house was built. The tower house was a tall, slender castle of stone and was built primarily for defence. During Tudor times in the 16th century, a long house was added. The 18th century saw the construction of two further buildings, forming the structure of Killaghy Castle as it stands today. The castle has undergone extensive restoration. The castle was originally owned by the Despard family. It is now a self-catering business.

Mullinahone is the home of PAWS Animal Rescue, the second largest dog sanctuary in Ireland, next to Dogs Trust Dublin. PAWS is a registered charity which rescues and provides new homes to abandoned and abused dogs.

== Sport ==
The local Gaelic Athletic Association club is Mullinahone GAA. Mullinahone FC is a local soccer club.

== Notable people ==
- Bill Britton (1890–1965), was a silver medallist in the hammer throw at the 1930 British Empire Games.
- Charles Kickham (1828–1882), writer, balladeer and Fenian leader, was born in the village and is buried in the parish cemetery.
- Canon Edmond Kelly (1874-1955), born in New Inn and later Curate of Mullinahone. He then became Parish Priest of Killenaule from 1934 to 1955.

== See also ==
- List of towns and villages in Ireland
