= R688 road (Ireland) =

Road in Ireland

R688 road
- Bóthar R688
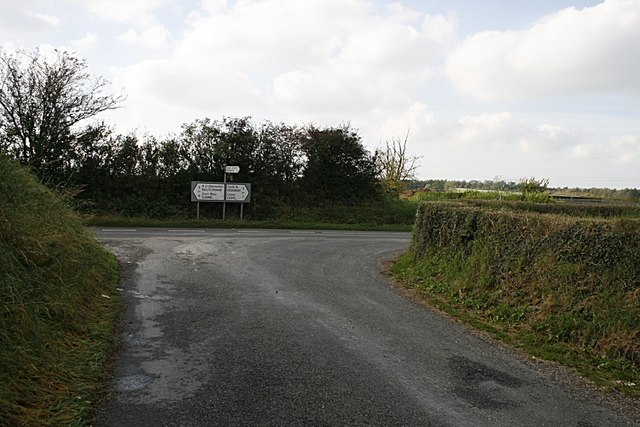
- Clashalaher Crossroads, south of Rosegreen, on the R688

Route information
- Length: 24 km (15 mi)

Location
- Country: Ireland
- Primary destinations: County Tipperary; Cashel - Starts at junction with the R691; Joins the R692; crosses the M8.; Leaves the R692; Rosegreen; Ballydoyle; Clerihan; Crosses the N24.; Terminates at Western Road in Clonmel

Highway system
- Roads in Ireland; Motorways; Primary; Secondary; Regional

The R688 road is a regional road in County Tipperary, Ireland. The route runs from Cashel to Clonmel via Rosegreen, passing over junction 8 of the M8 motorway. The route is approximately 25 km (16 mi) long.

== See also ==
- Roads in Ireland
- Motorways in Ireland
- National primary road
