= Cloneen, County Tipperary =

Village in County Tipperary, Ireland

Cloneen An Cluainín
- Village
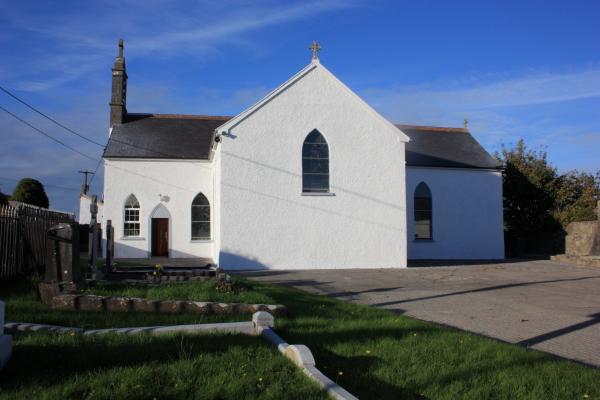
- Cloneen's Catholic church, the Church of the Visitation, was built in 1815

- Location in Ireland
- Coordinates: 52°28′30″N 7°35′52″W
- Country: Ireland
- Province: Munster
- County: County Tipperary
- Irish grid reference: S273359

Cloneen (Irish: An Cluainín) is a small village and civil parish in County Tipperary, Ireland. Located on the R692 regional road, the village is approximately 5 kilometres (3 mi) east of Fethard.

Cloneen's Catholic church was built, in 1815, on the site of a former medieval church. The church, known as the Church of the Visitation, is in the parish of Drangan and Cloneen in the Roman Catholic Archdiocese of Cashel and Emly.

The national (primary) school in the village, Cloneen National School, had an enrollment of approximately 100 pupils as of September 2017. The local Gaelic Athletic Association club is St Patrick's GAA club.
