= R689 road (Ireland) =

Road in Ireland

R689 road
- Bóthar R689
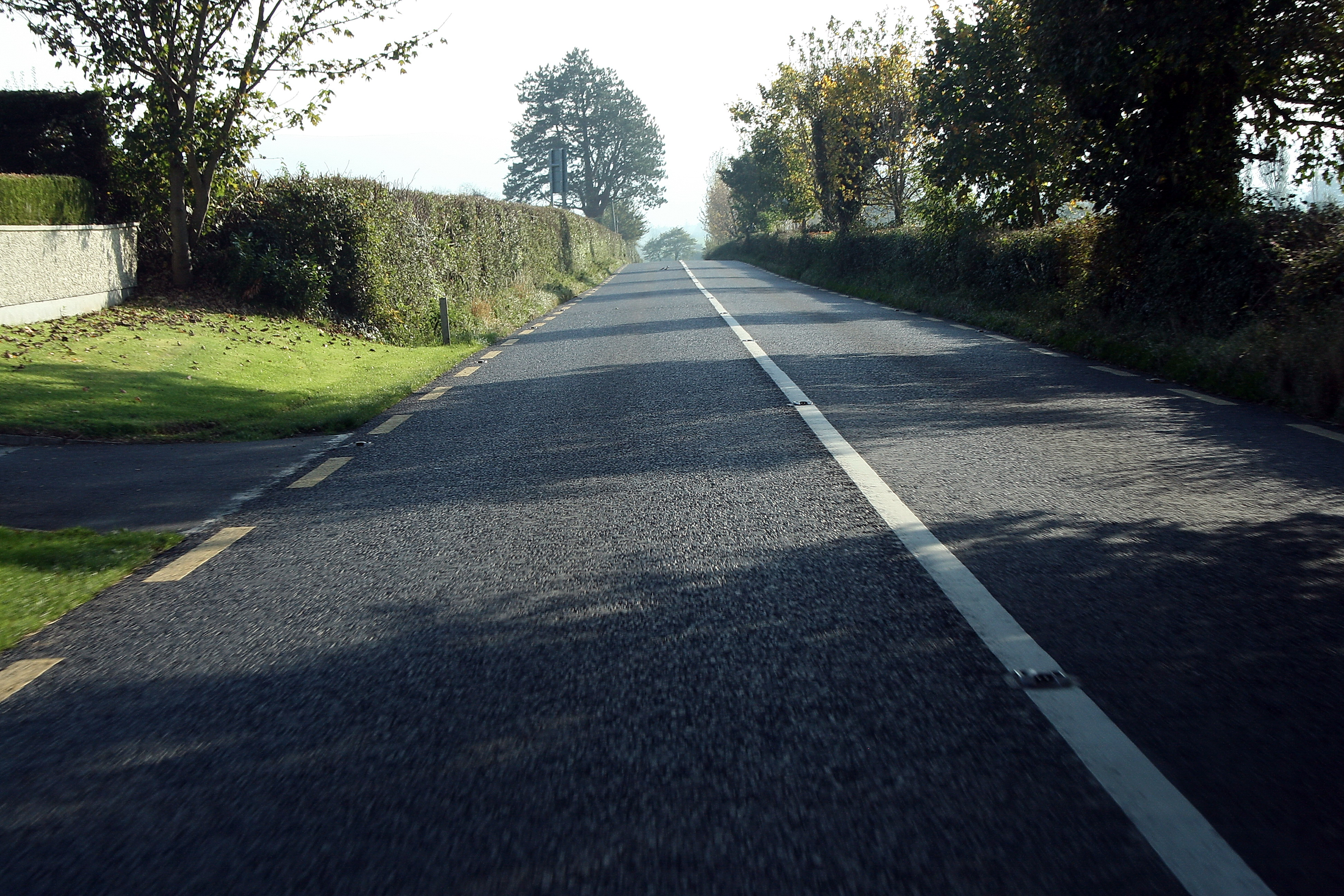
- R689 between Lisronagh and Clonmel

Route information
- Length: 48 km (30 mi)

Location
- Country: Ireland
- Primary destinations: County Kilkenny; Urlingford leave the N8; County Tipperary; (R690); Gortnahoo; Ballysloe; Joins the R691; Killenaule – leaves the R691; Fethard – joins/leaves the R692; Lisronagh; Clonmel – (N24); Terminates in Clonmel town centre

Highway system
- Roads in Ireland; Motorways; Primary; Secondary; Regional

The R689 road is a regional road in Ireland linking Urlingford to Clonmel. It passes through Killenaule and Fethard en route. The road is 48 km (30 mi) long.

== See also ==
- Roads in Ireland
- National primary road
- National secondary road
