= N76 road (Ireland) =

Road in Ireland

N76 road
- Bóthar N76
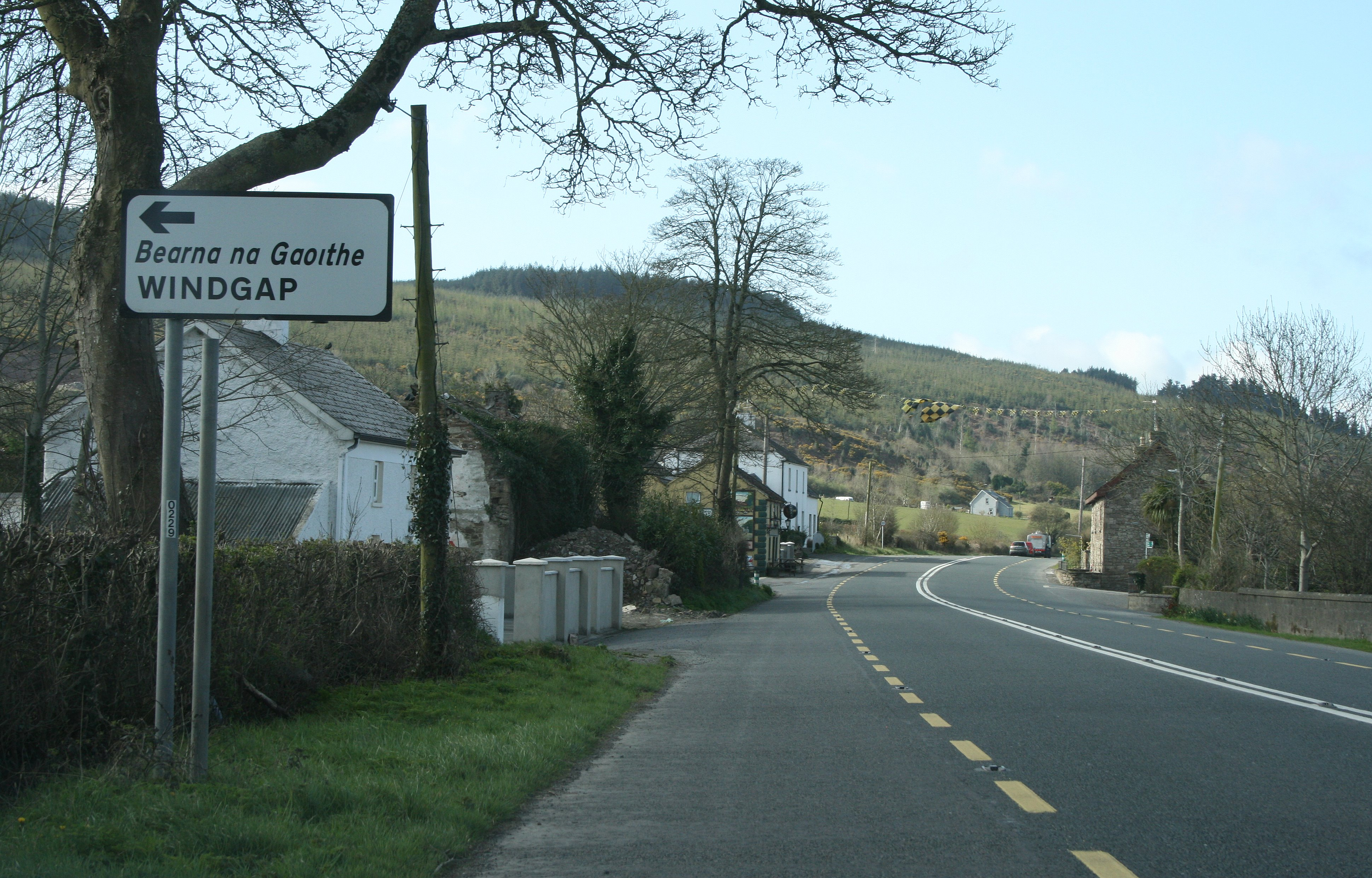
- N76 through Killamery, County Kilkenny

Route information
- Length: 43.686 km (27.145 mi)

Location
- Country: Ireland
- Primary destinations: County Kilkenny; Kilkenny; Grange; Ballymack; Callan; Killamery; County Tipperary; Ninemilehouse; Clonmel

Highway system
- Roads in Ireland; Motorways; Primary; Secondary; Regional

The N76 road is a national secondary road in Ireland. It links the N10 national primary on the ring road south of Kilkenny, County Kilkenny to the N24 national primary route east of Clonmel in County Tipperary.

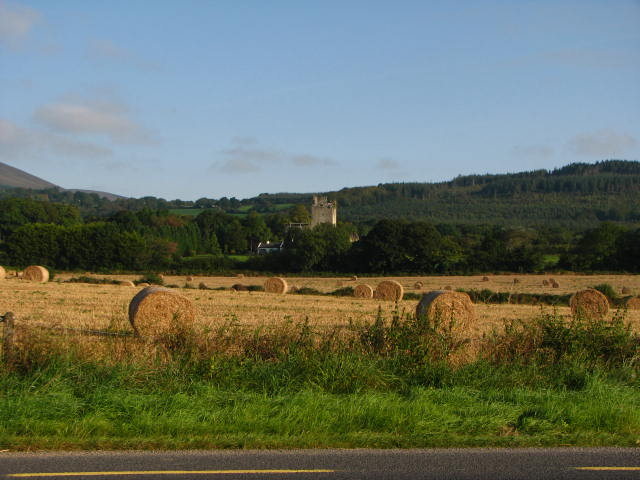
Kilcash Castle along the N76

The N76 is one of the oldest roads in Ireland. Between its start point east of Clonmel and its old route through Kilkenny, the N76 once formed an integral part of the T6 – the old trunk road that connected the cities of Cork and Dublin before the contemporary numbering system was established. It was mapped as such in Herman Moll's 1714 map of Ireland.

== See also ==
- Roads in Ireland
- Motorways in the Republic of Ireland
- National primary road
- Regional road
