= List of civil parishes of Ireland =

Civil parishes in Ireland are based on the medieval Christian parishes, adapted by the English administration and by the Church of Ireland. The parishes, their division into townlands and their grouping into baronies, were recorded in the Down Survey undertaken in 1656–58 by surveyors under William Petty. The purpose was primarily cadastral, recording land boundaries and ownership. The civil parishes are not administrative units. They differ from Catholic parishes, which are generally larger.

== Antrim ==
Civil parishes of County Antrim

There are 80 civil parishes in County Antrim.

- Aghagallon
- Aghalee
- Ahoghill
- Antrim
- Ardclinis
- Armoy
- Ballinderry
- Ballintoy
- Ballyclug
- Ballycor
- Ballylinny
- Ballymartin
- Ballymoney
- Ballynure
- Ballyrashane
- Ballyscullion
- Grange of Ballyscullion
- Ballywillin
- Billy
- Blaris
- Camlin
- Carncastle
- Carnmoney
- Carrickfergus (or St Nicholas)
- Connor
- Craigs
- Cranfield
- Culfeightrin
- Derryaghy
- Derrykeighan
- Grange of Doagh
- Donegore
- Drumbeg
- Drummaul
- Grange of Drumtullagh
- Dunaghy
- Grange of Dundermot
- Duneane
- Dunluce
- Finvoy
- Glenavy
- Glenwhirry
- Glynn
- Grange of Inispollan
- Inver
- Island Magee
- Kilbride
- Kildollagh
- Killagan
- Killead
- Grange of Killyglen
- Kilraghts
- Kilroot
- Kilwaughter
- Kirkinriola
- Lambeg
- Larne
- Layd
- Grange of Layd
- Loughguile
- Magheragall
- Magheramesk
- Grange of Muckamore
- Newtown Crommelin
- Grange of Nilteen
- Portglenone
- Racavan
- Raloo
- Ramoan
- Rasharkin
- Rashee
- Rathlin
- Grange of Shilvodan
- Skerry
- Templecorran
- Templepatrick
- Tickmacrevan
- Tullaghgore
- Tullyrusk

== Armagh ==
There are 29 civil parishes in County Armagh.

- Armagh
- Ballymore
- Ballymyre
- Clonfeacle
- Creggan
- Derrynoose
- Drumcree
- Eglish
- Forkill
- Grange
- Jonesborough
- Keady
- Kilclooney
- Kildarton
- Killevy
- Killyman
- Kilmore
- Lisnadill
- Loughgall
- Loughgilly
- Magheralin
- Montiaghs
- Mullaghbrack
- Newry
- Newtownhamilton
- Seagoe
- Shankill
- Tartaraghan
- Tynan

== Carlow ==
There are 47 civil parishes in County Carlow.

- Agha
- Aghade
- Ardoyne
- Ardristan
- Ballinacarrig
- Ballon
- Ballycrogue
- Ballyellin
- Baltinglass
- Barragh
- Carlow
- Clonmelsh
- Clonmore
- Clonygoose
- Cloydagh
- Crecrin
- Dunleckny
- Fennagh
- Gilbertstown
- Grangeford
- Hacketstown
- Haroldstown
- Kellistown
- Killerrig
- Killinane
- Kiltegan
- Kiltennell
- Kineagh
- Lorum
- Moyacomb
- Myshall
- Nurney
- Oldleighlin
- Painestown
- Rahill
- Rathmore
- Rathvilly
- Sliguff
- St Mullin's
- Straboe
- Templepeter
- Tullowcreen
- Tullowmagimma
- Tullowphelim
- Ullard
- Urglin
- Wells

== Cavan ==
There are 36 civil parishes in County Cavan.

- Annagelliff
- Annagh
- Bailieborough
- Ballintemple
- Ballymachugh
- Castlerahan
- Castleterra
- Crosserlough
- Denn
- Drumgoon
- Drumlane
- Drumlumman
- Drumreilly
- Drung
- Enniskeen
- Kilbride
- Kildallan
- Kildrumsherdan
- Killeshandra
- Killinagh
- Killinkere
- Kilmore
- Kinawley
- Knockbride
- Larah
- Lavey
- Loughan or Castlekeeran
- Lurgan
- Moybolgue
- Mullagh
- Munterconnaught
- Scrabby
- Shercock
- Templeport
- Tomregan
- Urney

== Clare ==
There are 81 civil parishes in County Clare.

- Abbey
- Bunratty
- Carran
- Clareabbey
- Clondagad
- Clonlea
- Clonloghan
- Clonrush
- Clooney (Bunratty Upper)
- Clooney (Corcomroe)
- Doora
- Drumcliff
- Drumcreehy
- Drumline
- Dysert
- Feakle
- Feenagh
- Gleninagh
- Inagh
- Inchicronan
- Inishcaltra
- Kilballyowen
- Kilchreest
- Kilconry
- Kilcorney
- Kilfarboy
- Kilfearagh
- Kilfenora
- Kilfiddane
- Kilfinaghta
- Kilfintinan
- Kilkeedy
- Killadysert
- Killaloe
- Killard
- Killaspuglonane
- Killeany
- Killeely
- Killilagh
- Killimer
- Killinaboy
- Killofin
- Killokennedy
- Killonaghan
- Killone
- Killuran
- Kilmacduane
- Kilmacrehy
- Kilmaleery
- Kilmaley
- Kilmanaheen
- Kilmihil
- Kilmoon
- Kilmurry McMahon
- Kilmurry Ibrickane
- Kilmurry-Negaul
- Kilnamona
- Kilnasoolagh
- Kilnoe
- Kilraghtis
- Kilrush
- Kilseily
- Kilshanny
- Kiltenanlea
- Kiltoraght
- Moyarta
- Moynoe
- Noughaval
- O'Brien's Bridge
- Ogonnelloe
- Oughtmama
- Quin
- Rath
- Rathborney
- Ruan
- St. Munchin's
- St. Patrick's
- Templemaley
- Tomfinlough
- Tomgraney
- Tulla

== Cork ==
There are 250 civil parishes in County Cork. Baronies are in parentheses where the name occurs more than once in the county.

=== East ===
There are 111 civil parishes in East Cork.

- Aghacross
- Aghada
- Aghern
- Ardagh
- Ardnageehy
- Ballintemple
- Ballycurrany
- Ballydeloher
- Ballydeloughy
- Ballyfeard
- Ballyfoyle
- Ballyhooly
- Ballynoe
- Ballyoughtera
- Ballyspillane
- Barnahely
- Bohillane
- Bridgetown
- Brigown
- Britway
- Caherlag
- Carrigaline
- Carrigdownane
- Carrigleamleary
- Carrigtwohill
- Castlelyons
- Castletownroche
- Clenor
- Clondulane
- Clonmel
- Clonmult
- Clonpriest
- Cloyne
- Coole
- Corkbeg
- Cullen (Kinalea)
- Dangandonovan
- Derryvillane
- Doneraile
- Dunbulloge
- Dungourney
- Dunmahon
- Farahy
- Fermoy
- Garranekinnefeake
- Garryvoe
- Glanworth
- Gortroe
- Ightermurragh
- Imogeely
- Inch
- Inchinabackey
- Kilcredan
- Kilcrumper
- Kilcully
- Kilcummer
- Kildorrery
- Kilgullane
- Killanully
- Killaspugmullane
- Killathy
- Killeagh
- Killeenemer
- Kilmacdonogh
- Kilmahon
- Kilmoney
- Kilmonoge
- Kilpatrick
- Kilphelan
- Kilquane (Barrymore)
- Kilshanahan
- Kilworth
- Kinure
- Knockmourne
- Leitrim
- Liscleary
- Lisgoold
- Lismore and Mocollop
- Litter
- Little Island
- Macroney
- Marmullane
- Marshalstown
- Middleton
- Mogeely
- Mogeesha
- Monanimy
- Monkstown
- Nohoval
- Rahan
- Rathcooney
- Rathcormack
- Rostellan
- St. Michaels
- St. Nathlash
- Templebodan
- Templebreedy
- Templemolaga
- Templenacarriga
- Templeroan
- Templerobin
- Templeusque
- Titeskin
- Trabolgan
- Tracton
- Wallstown
- Youghal

=== North-West ===
There are 71 civil parishes in North-West Cork.

- Aghabullogue
- Aghinagh
- Aglish
- Aglishdrinagh
- Ardskeagh
- Athnowen
- Ballyclogh
- Ballyhay
- Ballyvourney
- Bregoge
- Buttevant
- Caherduggan
- Cannaway
- Carrigrohane
- Carrigrohanebeg
- Castlemagner
- Churchtown
- Clondrohid
- Clonfert
- Clonmeen
- Cooliney
- Corbally
- Corcomhide
- Cullen (Duhallow)
- Currykippane
- Desertmore
- Donoughmore (Muskerry)
- Drishane
- Dromtarriff
- Drumdowney
- Duniskey
- Garrycloyne
- Grenagh
- Hackmys
- Imphrick
- Inchigeelagh
- Inishcarra
- Inishkenny
- Kilbolane
- Kilbonane
- Kilbrin
- Kilbroney
- Kilcorcoran
- Kilcorney
- Kilgrogan
- Kilmaclenine
- Kilmeen (Duhallow)
- Kilmichael
- Kilmurry
- Kilnaglory
- Kilnamartyra
- Kilquane (Fermoy)
- Kilroe
- Kilshannig
- Knocktemple
- Lackeen
- Liscarroll
- Macloneigh
- Macroom
- Magourney
- Mallow
- Matehy
- Mourneabbey
- Moviddy
- Nohavaldaly
- Rathgoggan
- Roskeen
- Shandrum
- Subulter
- Tullylease
- Whitechurch

=== West ===
There are 68 civil parishes in West Cork.

- Abbeymahon
- Abbeystrowry
- Aghadown
- Ardfield
- Ballinaboy
- Ballinadee
- Ballymartle
- Ballymodan
- Ballymoney
- Brinny
- Caheragh
- Castlehaven
- Castleventry
- Clear-Island
- Clontead
- Creagh
- Desert
- Desertserges
- Donaghmore
- Drinagh
- Dromdaleague
- Dunderrow
- Durrus
- Fanlobbus
- Inishannon
- Island
- Kilbrittain
- Kilbrogan
- Kilcaskan
- Kilcatherine
- Kilcoe
- Kilcrohane
- Kilfaughnabeg
- Kilgarriff
- Kilkerranmore
- Killaconenagh
- Killowen
- Kilmacabea
- Kilmaloda
- Kilmeen (East Carbery)
- Kilmocomoge
- Kilmoe
- Kilnagross
- Kilnamanagh
- Kilroan
- Kilsillagh
- Kinneigh
- Kinsale
- Knockavilly
- Leighmoney
- Lislee
- Murragh
- Myross
- Rathbarry
- Rathclarin
- Ringcurran
- Ringrone
- Ross
- Skull
- Templebryan
- Templemartin
- Templemichael
- Templeomalus
- Templequinlan
- Templetrine
- Timoleague
- Tisaxon
- Tullagh

== Donegal ==
There are 52 civil parishes in County Donegal:

- Aghanunshin
- Allsaints
- Aughnish
- Burt
- Clonca
- Clondahorky
- Clondavaddog
- Clonleigh
- Clonmany
- Convoy
- Conwal
- Culdaff
- Desertegny
- Donagh
- Donaghmore
- Donegal
- Drumhome
- Fahan Lower
- Fahan Upper
- Gartan
- Glencolmcille
- Inch
- Inishkeel
- Inishmacsaint
- Inver
- Kilbarron
- Kilcar
- Killaghtee
- Killea
- Killybegs Lower
- Killybegs Upper
- Killygarvan
- Killymard
- Kilmacrennan
- Kilteevoge
- Leck
- Lettermacward
- Mevagh
- Mintiaghs or Barr of Inch
- Moville Lower
- Moville Upper
- Muff
- Raphoe
- Raymoghy
- Raymunterdoney
- Stranorlar
- Taughboyne
- Templecarn
- Temple crone
- Tullaghobegly
- Tullyfern
- Urney

== Down ==
There are 71 civil parishes in County Down:

- Aghaderg
- Annaclone
- Annahilt
- Ardglass
- Ardkeen
- Ardquin
- Ballee
- Ballyculter
- Ballyhalbert alias St. Andrews
- Ballykinler
- Ballyphilip
- Ballytrustan
- Ballywalter
- Bangor
- Blaris
- Bright
- Castleboy
- Clonallan
- Clonduff
- Comber
- Donaghadee
- Donaghcloney
- Donaghmore
- Down
- Dromara
- Dromore
- Drumballyroney
- Drumbeg
- Drumbo
- Drumgath
- Drumgooland
- Dundonald
- Dunsfort
- Garvaghy
- Greyabbey
- Hillsborough
- Holywood
- Inch
- Inishargy
- Kilbroney
- Kilclief
- Kilcoo
- Kilkeel
- Killaney
- Killinchy
- Killyleagh
- Kilmegan
- Kilmood
- Kilmore
- Knockbreda
- Lambeg
- Loughinisland
- Maghera
- Magheradrool
- Magherahamlet
- Magheralin
- Magherally
- Moira
- Newry
- Newtownards
- Rathmullan
- Saintfield
- Saul
- Seapatrick
- Shankill
- Slanes
- Tullylish
- Tullynakill
- Tyrella
- Warrenpoint
- Witter

== Dublin ==
There are 83 civil parishes in County Dublin:

- Aderrig
- Artaine
- Baldongan
- Baldoyle
- Balgriffin
- Ballyboghil
- Ballyfermot
- Ballymadun
- Balrothery
- Balscaddan
- Booterstown
- Castleknock
- Chapelizod
- Cloghran, Castleknock
- Cloghran, Coolock
- Clondalkin
- Clonmethan
- Clonsilla
- Clontarf
- Clonturk
- Coolock
- Cruagh
- Crumlin
- Dalkey
- Donabate
- Donnybrook
- Drimnagh
- Esker
- Finglas
- Garristown
- Glasnevin
- Grallagh
- Grangegorman
- Hollywood
- Holmpatrick
- Howth
- Kilbarrack
- Kilbride
- Kilgobbin
- Kill
- Killeek
- Killester
- Killiney
- Killossery
- Kilmactalway
- Kilmacud
- Kilmahuddrick
- Kilsallaghan
- Kiltiernan
- Kinsaley
- Leixlip
- Lucan
- Lusk
- Malahide
- Monkstown
- Mulhuddart
- Naul
- Newcastle
- Oldconnaught
- Palmerstown
- Portmarnock
- Portraine
- Raheny
- Rathcoole
- Rathfarnham
- Rathmichael
- Saggart
- Santry
- St. Margarets
- St. Peters
- Stillorgan
- Swords
- Tallaght
- Taney
- Tully
- Ward
- Westpalstown
- Whitechurch

=== City of Dublin ===
- St. Catherines
- St. Georges
- St. James
- St. Marks
- St. Nicholas Without

== Fermanagh ==
There are 24 civil parishes in County Fermanagh

- Aghalurcher (also County Tyrone)
- Aghavea
- Belleek
- Boho
- Cleenish
- Clogher
- Clones (also Clones, County Monaghan)
- Currin
- Derrybrusk
- Derryvullan
- Devenish
- Drumkeeran
- Drummully (also County Monaghan)
- Enniskillen
- Galloon
- Inishmacsaint (also County Donegal)
- Killesher
- Kinawley
- Magheracross
- Magheraculmoney
- Rossorry
- Templecarn
- Tomregan
- Trory

== Galway ==
There are 120 civil parishes in County Galway:

- Abbeygormacan
- Abbeyknockmoy
- Addergoole
- Ahascragh
- Annaghdown
- Ardrahan
- Athenry
- Athleague
- Aughrim
- Ballinchalla
- Ballindoon
- Ballinrobe
- Ballymacward
- Ballynacourty
- Ballynakill (Ballymoe)
- Ballynakill (Ballynahinch)
- Ballynakill (Killian)
- Ballynakill (Leitrim)
- Beagh
- Belclare
- Boyounagh
- Bullaun
- Cargin
- Claregalway
- Clonbern
- Clonfert
- Clonkeen
- Clonrush
- Clontuskert
- Cong
- Cummer
- Donaghpatrick
- Donanaghta
- Drumacoo
- Drumatemple
- Dunamon
- Duniry
- Dunmore
- Fahy
- Fohanagh
- Grange
- Inishcaltra
- Inisheer
- Inishman
- Inishmore
- Isertkelly
- Kilbarron
- Kilbeacanty
- Kilbegnet
- Kilbennan
- Kilchreest
- Kilcloony
- Kilcolgan
- Kilconickny
- Kilconierin
- Kilconla
- Kilconnell
- Kilcooly
- Kilcoona
- Kilcroan
- Kilcummin
- Kilgerrill
- Kilkerrin
- Kilkilvery
- Killaan
- Killallaghtan
- Killannin
- Killeany
- Killeely
- Killeenadeema
- Killeenavarra
- Killeeneen
- Killererin
- Killeroran
- Killian
- Killimorbologue
- Killimordaly
- Killinan
- Killinny
- Killogilleen
- Killora
- Killoran
- Killoscobe
- Killosolan
- Killower
- Killursa
- Kilmacduagh
- Kilmalinoge
- Kilmeen
- Kilmoylan
- Kilquain
- Kilreekill
- Kiltartan
- Kilteskill
- Kilthomas
- Kiltormer
- Kiltullagh
- Kinvarradoorus
- Lackagh
- Leitrim
- Lickerrig
- Lickmolassy
- Liskeevy
- Loughrea
- Meelick
- Monivea
- Moycullen
- Moylough
- Moyrus
- Omey
- Oranmore
- Rahoon
- Ross
- St. Nicholas
- Stradbally
- Taghboy
- Templetogher
- Tiranascragh
- Tuam
- Tynagh

== Kerry ==
There are 87 civil parishes in County Kerry:

- Aghadoe
- Aghavallen
- Aglish
- Annagh
- Ardfert
- Ballincuslane
- Ballinvoher
- Ballyconry
- Ballyduff
- Ballyheige
- Ballymacelligott
- Ballynacourty
- Ballynahaglish
- Ballyseedy
- Brosna
- Caher
- Castleisland
- Cloghane
- Clogherbrien
- Currans
- Dingle
- Dromod
- Duagh
- Dunquin
- Dunurlin
- Dysert (Listowel)
- Dysert (Trughanacmy)
- Fenit
- Finuge
- Galey
- Garfinny
- Glanbehy
- Kenmare
- Kilbonane
- Kilcaragh
- Kilcaskan
- Kilcolman
- Kilconly
- Kilcredane
- Kilcrohane
- Kilcummin
- Kildrum
- Kilfeighny
- Kilflyn
- Kilgarrylander
- Kilgarvan
- Kilgobban
- Killaha
- Killahan
- Killarney
- Killeentierna
- Killehenny
- Killemlagh
- Killinane
- Killiney
- Killorglin
- Killury
- Kilmalkedar
- Kilmoyly
- Kilnanare
- Kilnaughtin
- Kilquane
- Kilshenane
- Kiltallagh
- Kiltomy
- Kinard
- Knockane
- Knockanure
- Lisselton
- Listowel
- Marhin
- Minard
- Molahiffe
- Murher
- Nohaval
- Nohavaldaly
- O Brennan
- O Dorney
- Prior
- Ratass
- Rattoo
- Stradbally
- Templenoe
- Tralee
- Tuosist
- Valencia
- Ventry

== Kildare ==
There currently appear to be 113 civil parishes in County Kildare. This includes two civil parishes named Cloncurry, two named Nurney, and two named Tully. Before 1881, there were also civil parishes of Ballybought, Coughlanstown and Jago.

Other sources treat Cloncurry, Nurney and Tully all as one civil parish each. Additionally, some include the civil parishes that no longer exist.

=== Current ===
- Ardkill
- Ardree
- Ballaghmoon
- Ballybrackan
- Ballymany
- Ballymore Eustace
- Ballynadrumny
- Ballynafagh
- Ballysax
- Ballyshannon
- Balraheen
- Belan
- Bodenstown
- Brannockstown
- Brideschurch
- Cadamstown
- Carbury
- Carn
- Carnalway
- Carragh
- Carrick
- Castledermot
- Castledillon
- Churchtown
- Clane
- Clonaghlis
- Cloncurry
- Cloncurry
- Clonshanbo
- Confey
- Davidstown
- Donadea
- Donaghcumper
- Donaghmore
- Downings
- Duneany
- Dunfierth
- Dunmanoge
- Dunmurraghill
- Dunmurry
- Feighcullen
- Fontstown
- Forenaghts
- Gilltown
- Graney
- Grangeclare
- Grangerosnolvan
- Greatconnell
- Harristown
- Haynestown
- Johnstown
- Kerdiffstown
- Kilberry
- Kilcock
- Kilcullen
- Kildangan
- Kildare
- Kildrought
- Kilkea
- Kill
- Killadoon
- Killashee
- Killelan
- Killybegs
- Kilmacredock
- Kilmeage
- Kilmore
- Kilpatrick
- Kilrainy
- Kilrush
- Kilteel
- Kineagh
- Knavinstown
- Lackagh
- Ladytown
- Laraghbryan
- Leixlip
- Lullymore
- Lyons
- Mainham
- Monasterevin
- Moone
- Morristownbiller
- Mylerstown
- Naas
- Narraghmore
- Nurney
- Nurney
- Oldconnell
- Oughterard
- Painestown
- Pollardstown
- Rathangan
- Rathernan
- Rathmore
- Scullogestown
- Sherlockstown
- St. Johns
- St. Michaels
- Stacumny
- Straffan
- Taghadoe
- Tankardstown
- Thomastown
- Timahoe
- Timolin
- Tipper
- Tipperkevin
- Tully
- Tully
- Usk
- Walterstown
- Whitechurch

=== Previous ===
- Ballybought
- Coghlanstown
- Jago

== Kilkenny ==
There are 140 civil parishes in County Kilkenny:

- Abbeyleix
- Aghaviller
- Aglish
- Aharney
- Arderra
- Attanagh
- Balleen
- Ballinamara
- Ballybur
- Ballycallan
- Ballygurrim
- Ballylarkin
- Ballylinch
- Ballytarsney
- Ballytobin
- Blackrath
- Blanchvilleskill
- Borrismore
- Burnchurch
- Callan
- Castlecomer
- Castleinch or Inchyolaghan
- Clara
- Clashacrow
- Clomantagh
- Clonamery
- Clonmore
- Columbkille
- Coolaghmore
- Coolcashin
- Coolcraheen
- Danesfort
- Derrynahinch
- Donaghmore
- Dunbell
- Dungarvan
- Dunkitt
- Dunmore
- Dunnamaggan
- Durrow
- Dysart
- Dysartmoon
- Earlstown
- Ennisnag
- Erke
- Famma
- Fertagh
- Fiddown
- Freshford
- Garranamanagh
- Gaulskill
- Glashare
- Gowran
- Graiguenamanagh
- Grange
- Grangekilree
- Grangemaccomb
- Grangesilvia
- Inistioge
- Jerpoint West
- Jerpointabbey
- Jerpointchurch
- Kells
- Kilbeacon
- Kilbride
- Kilcoan
- Kilcolumb
- Kilcooly
- Kilderry
- Kilfane
- Kilferagh
- Kilkeasy
- Kilkieran
- Killahy (Crannagh)
- Killahy (Knocktopher)
- Killaloe
- Killamery
- Killarney
- Kilmacahill
- Kilmacar
- Kilmacow
- Kilmademoge
- Kilmadum
- Kilmaganny
- Kilmakevoge
- Kilmanagh
- Kilmenan
- Kilree
- Knocktopher
- Lismateige
- Listerlin
- Mallardstown
- Mayne
- Mothell
- Muckalee (Fassadinin)
- Muckalee (Knocktopher)
- Odagh
- Outrath
- Owning
- Pleberstown
- Pollrone
- Portnascully
- Powerstown
- Rathaspick
- Rathbeagh
- Rathcoole
- Rathkieran
- Rathlogan
- Rathpatrick
- Rosbercon
- Rosconnell
- Rossinan
- Shanbogh
- Shankill
- Sheffin
- St. Canice
- St. Johns
- St. Martins
- St. Marys
- St. Mauls
- St. Patricks
- Stonecarthy
- The Rower
- Thomastown
- Tibberaghny
- Tiscoffin
- Treadingstown
- Tubbrid
- Tubbridbritain
- Tullaghanbrogue
- Tullaherin
- Tullahought
- Tullamaine
- Tullaroan
- Ullard
- Ullid
- Urlingford
- Wells
- Whitechurch
- Woolengrange

== Laois ==
There are 53 civil parishes in County Laois:

- Abbeyleix
- Aghaboe
- Aghmacart
- Aharney
- Ardea
- Attanagh
- Ballyadams
- Ballyroan
- Bordwell
- Borris
- Castlebrack
- Clonenagh and Clonagheen
- Cloydagh
- Coolbanagher
- Coolkerry
- Curraclone
- Donaghmore
- Durrow
- Dysartenos
- Dysartgallen
- Erke
- Fossy or Timahoe
- Glashare
- Kilcolmanbane
- Kilcolmanbrack
- Kildellig
- Killabban
- Killenny
- Killermogh
- Killeshin
- Kilmanman
- Kilteale
- Kyle
- Lea
- Monksgrange
- Moyanna
- Offerlane
- Rathaspick
- Rathdowney
- Rathsaran
- Rearymore
- Rosconnell
- Rosenallis
- Shrule
- Skirk
- Sleaty
- St. Johns
- Straboe
- Stradbally
- Tankardstown
- Tecolm
- Timogue
- Tullomoy

== Leitrim ==
There are 17 civil parishes in County Leitrim:

- Annaduff
- Carrigallen
- Cloonclare
- Cloone
- Cloonlogher
- Drumlease
- Drumreilly
- Fenagh
- Inishmagrath
- Killanummery
- Killarga
- Killasnet
- Kiltoghert
- Kiltubbrid
- Mohill
- Oughteragh
- Rossinver

== Limerick ==
There are 130 civil parishes in County Limerick:

- Abbeyfeale
- Abington
- Adare
- Aglishcormick
- Anhid
- Ardagh
- Ardcanny
- Ardpatrick
- Askeaton
- Athlacca
- Athea
- Ballinard
- Ballingaddy
- Ballingarry (Connello)
- Ballingarry (Coshlea)
- Ballinlough
- Ballybrood
- Ballycahane
- Ballylanders
- Ballynaclogh
- Ballynamona
- Ballyscaddan
- Bruff
- Bruree
- Caheravally
- Caherconlish
- Cahercorney
- Caherelly
- Cahernarry
- Cappagh
- Carrigparson
- Castletown
- Chapelrussell
- Clonagh
- Cloncagh
- Cloncrew
- Clonelty
- Clonkeen
- Clonshire
- Colmanswell
- Corcomohide
- Crecora
- Croagh
- Croom
- Darragh
- Derrygalvin
- Donaghmore
- Doon
- Doondonnell
- Drehidtarsna
- Dromcolliher
- Dromin
- Dromkeen
- Dunmoylan
- Dysert
- Effin
- Emlygrennan
- Fedamore
- Galbally
- Glenogra
- Grange
- Grean
- Hackmys
- Hospital
- Inch St. Lawrence
- Iveruss
- Kilbeheny
- Kilbolane
- Kilbradran
- Kilbreedy Major
- Kilbreedy Minor
- Kilcolman
- Kilcornan
- Kilcullane
- Kildimo
- Kilfergus
- Kilfinnane
- Kilfinny
- Kilflyn
- Kilfrush
- Kilkeedy
- Killagholehane
- Killeedy
- Killeely
- Killeenagarriff
- Killeenoghty
- Killonahan
- Kilmeedy
- Kilmoylan
- Kilmurry
- Kilpeacon
- Kilquane
- Kilscannell
- Kilteely
- Knockainy
- Knocklong
- Knocknagaul
- Lismakeery
- Loghill
- Ludden
- Mahoonagh
- Monagay
- Monasteranenagh
- Morgans
- Mungret
- Nantinan
- Newcastle
- Oola
- Particles
- Rathjordan
- Rathkeale
- Rathronan
- Robertstown
- Rochestown
- Shanagolden
- Saint John's
- Saint Lawrence's
- Saint Michael's
- Saint Munchin's
- Saint Nicholas
- Saint Patrick's
- Saint Peter's and Saint Paul's
- Stradbally
- Tankardstown
- Templebredon
- Tomdeely
- Tullabracky
- Tuogh
- Tuoghcluggin
- Uregare

== Derry ==
There are 46 civil parishes in County Londonderry:

- Aghadowey
- Aghanloo
- Agivey
- Arboe
- Artrea
- Ballinderry
- Ballyaghran
- Ballymoney
- Ballynascreen
- Ballyrashane
- Ballyscullion
- Ballywillin
- Balteagh
- Banagher
- Bovevagh
- Carrick
- Clondermot
- Coleraine
- Cumber Lower
- Cumber Upper
- Derryloran
- Desertlyn
- Desertmartin
- Desertoghill
- Drumachose
- Dunboe
- Dungiven
- Errigal
- Faughanvale
- Formoyle
- Kilcronaghan
- Kildollagh
- Killelagh
- Killowen
- Kilrea
- Learmount
- Lissan
- Macosquin
- Maghera
- Magherafelt
- Magilligan
- Tamlaght
- Tamlaght Finlagan
- Tamlaght O'Crilly
- Templemore
- Termoneeny

== Longford ==
There are 26 civil parishes in County Longford:

- Abbeylara
- Abbeyshrule
- Agharra
- Ardagh
- Ballymacormick
- Cashel
- Clonbroney
- Clongesh
- Columbkille
- Forgney
- Granard
- Kilcommock
- Kilglass
- Killashee
- Killoe
- Mohill
- Mostrim
- Moydow
- Noughaval
- Rathcline
- Rathreagh
- Shrule
- Street
- Taghsheenod
- Taghshinny
- Templemichael

== Louth ==
There are 63 civil parishes in County Louth:

- Ardee
- Ballybarrack
- Ballyboys
- Ballymakenny
- Ballymascanlan
- Barronstown
- Beaulieu
- Cappoge
- Carlingford
- Carrickbaggot
- Castletown
- Charlestown
- Clogher
- Clonkeehan
- Clonkeen
- Clonmore
- Collon
- Creggan
- Darver
- Dromin
- Dromiskin
- Drumcar
- Drumshallon
- Dunany
- Dunbin
- Dundalk
- Dunleer
- Dysart
- Faughart
- Gernonstown
- Haggardstown
- Haynestown
- Inishkeen
- Kane
- Kildemock
- Killanny
- Killincoole
- Kilsaran
- Louth
- Mansfieldstown
- Mapastown
- Marlestown
- Mayne
- Monasterboice
- Mosstown
- Mullary
- Parsonstown
- Philipstown
- Philipstown district
- Philipstown-Nugent
- Port
- Rathdrumin
- Richardstown
- Roche
- Salterstown
- Shanlis
- Smarmore
- St. Peters
- Stabannan
- Stickillin
- Tallanstown
- Termonfeckin
- Tullyallen

== Mayo ==
There are 73 civil parishes in County Mayo:

- Achill
- Addergoole
- Aghagower
- Aghamore
- Aglish
- Annagh
- Ardagh
- Attymass
- Balla
- Ballinchalla
- Ballinrobe
- Ballintober
- Ballyhean
- Ballynahaglish
- Ballyovey
- Ballysakeery
- Bekan
- Bohola
- Breaghwy
- Burriscarra
- Burrishoole
- Castlemore
- Cong
- Crossboyne
- Crossmolina
- Doonfeeny
- Drum
- Inishbofin
- Islandeady
- Kilbeagh
- Kilbelfad
- Kilbride
- Kilcolman (Clanmorris)
- Kilcolman (Costello)
- Kilcommon (Erris)
- Kilcommon (Kilmaine)
- Kilconduff
- Kilcummin
- Kildacommoge
- Kilfian
- Kilgarvan
- Kilgeever
- Killala
- Killasser
- Killedan
- Kilmaclasser
- Kilmainebeg
- Kilmainemore
- Kilmeena
- Kilmolara
- Kilmore
- Kilmoremoy
- Kilmovee
- Kilturra
- Kilvine
- Knock
- Lackan
- Manulla
- Mayo
- Meelick
- Moorgagagh
- Moygawnagh
- Oughaval
- Rathreagh
- Robeen
- Rosslee
- Shrule
- Tagheen
- Templemore
- Templemurry
- Toomore
- Touaghty
- Turlough

== Meath ==
There are 146 civil parishes in County Meath:

- Agher
- Ardagh
- Ardbraccan
- Ardcath
- Ardmulchan
- Ardsallagh
- Assey
- Athboy
- Athlumney
- Balfeaghan
- Ballyboggan
- Ballygarth
- Ballymagarvey
- Ballymaglassan
- Balrathboyne
- Balsoon
- Bective
- Brownstown
- Burry
- Castlejordan
- Castlerickard
- Castletown
- Churchtown
- Clonalvy
- Clonard
- Clongill
- Clonmacduff
- Collon
- Colp
- Cookstown
- Crickstown
- Cruicetown
- Culmullin
- Cushinstown
- Danestown
- Derrypatrick
- Diamor
- Donaghmore (Navan)
- Donaghmore (Ratoath)
- Donaghpatrick
- Donore
- Dowdstown
- Dowth
- Drakestown
- Drumcondra
- Drumlargan
- Dulane
- Duleek
- Duleek Abbey
- Dunboyne
- Dunmoe
- Dunsany
- Dunshaughlin
- Emlagh
- Enniskeen
- Fennor
- Follistown
- Gallow
- Galtrim
- Gernonstown
- Girley
- Grangegeeth
- Greenoge
- Inishmot
- Julianstown
- Kells
- Kentstown
- Kilbeg
- Kilberry
- Kilbrew
- Kilbride (Dunboyne)
- Kilbride (Fore)
- Kilcarn
- Kilclone
- Kilcooly
- Kildalkey
- Killaconnigan
- Killallon
- Killary
- Killeagh
- Killeen
- Killegland
- Killyon
- Kilmainham
- Kilmessan
- Kilmoon
- Kilmore
- Kilsharvan
- Kilshine
- Kilskeer
- Kiltale
- Knock
- Knockcommon
- Knockmark
- Laracor
- Liscartan
- Lismullin
- Loughan or Castlekeeran
- Loughbrackan
- Loughcrew
- Macetown
- Martry
- Mitchelstown
- Monknewtown
- Monktown
- Moorechurch
- Moybolgue
- Moyglare
- Moylagh
- Moymet
- Moynalty
- Navan
- Newtown
- Newtownclonbun
- Nobber
- Oldcastle
- Painstown
- Piercetown
- Rataine
- Rathbeggan
- Rathcore
- Rathfeigh
- Rathkenny
- Rathmolyon
- Rathmore
- Rathregan
- Ratoath
- Rodanstown
- Scurlockstown
- Siddan
- Skreen
- Slane
- St. Marys
- Stackallan
- Staholmog
- Stamullin
- Straffordstown
- Tara
- Teltown
- Templekeeran
- Timoole
- Trevet
- Trim
- Trubley
- Tullaghanoge
- Tullyallen

== Monaghan ==
There are 23 civil parishes in County Monaghan:

- Aghabog
- Aughnamullen
- Ballybay
- Clones
- Clontibret
- Currin
- Donagh
- Donaghmoyne
- Drummully
- Drumsnat
- Ematris
- Errigal Trough
- Inishkeen
- Killanny
- Killeevan
- Kilmore
- Magheracloone
- Magheross
- Monaghan
- Muckno
- Tydavnet
- Tehallan
- Tullycorbet

== Offaly ==
There are 51 civil parishes in County Offaly:

- Aghancon
- Ardnurcher or Horseleap
- Ballyboy
- Ballyburly
- Ballycommon
- Ballykean
- Ballymacwilliam
- Ballynakill
- Birr
- Borrisnafarney
- Castlejordan
- Castletownely
- Clonmacnoise
- Clonsast
- Clonyhurk
- Corbally
- Croghan
- Cullenwaine
- Drumcullen
- Dunkerrin
- Durrow
- Eglish
- Ettagh
- Finglas
- Gallen
- Geashill
- Kilbride (Ballycowan)
- Kilbride (Kilcoursey)
- Kilclonfert
- Kilcolman
- Kilcomin
- Kilcumreragh
- Killaderry
- Killoughy
- Kilmanaghan
- Kilmurryely
- Kinnitty
- Lemanaghan
- Letterluna
- Lusmagh
- Lynally
- Monasteroris
- Rahan
- Reynagh
- Roscomroe
- Roscrea
- Seirkieran
- Shinrone
- Templeharry
- Tisaran
- Wheery or Killagally

== Roscommon ==
There are 60 civil parishes in County Roscommon:

- Ardcarn
- Athleague
- Aughrim
- Ballintober
- Ballynakill
- Baslick
- Boyle
- Bumlin
- Cam
- Castlemore
- Clooncraff
- Cloonfinlough
- Cloontuskert
- Cloonygormican
- Creagh
- Creeve
- Drum
- Drumatemple
- Dunamon
- Dysart
- Elphin
- Estersnow
- Fuerty
- Kilbride
- Kilbryan
- Kilcolagh
- Kilcolman
- Kilcooley
- Kilcorkey
- Kilgefin
- Kilglass
- Kilkeevin
- Killinvoy
- Killukin (Boyle)
- Killukin (Roscommon)
- Killummod
- Kilmacumsy
- Kilmeane
- Kilmore
- Kilnamanagh
- Kilronan
- Kilteevan
- Kiltoom
- Kiltrustan
- Kiltullagh
- Lissonuffy
- Moore
- Ogulla
- Oran
- Rahara
- Roscommon
- Shankill
- St. Johns
- St. Peters
- Taghboy
- Taghmaconnell
- Termonbarry
- Tibohine
- Tisrara
- Tumna

== Sligo ==
There are 41 civil parishes in County Sligo:

- Achonry
- Aghanagh
- Ahamlish
- Ballynakill
- Ballysadare
- Ballysumaghan
- Calry
- Castleconor
- Cloonoghil
- Dromard
- Drumcliff
- Drumcolumb
- Drumrat
- Easky
- Emlaghfad
- Kilcolman
- Kilfree
- Kilglass
- Killadoon
- Killaraght
- Killaspugbrone
- Killerry
- Killoran
- Kilmacallan
- Kilmacowen
- Kilmacshalgan
- Kilmacteige
- Kilmactranny
- Kilmoremoy
- Kilmorgan
- Kilross
- Kilshalvy
- Kilturra
- Kilvarnet
- Rossinver
- Shancough
- Skreen
- St. Johns
- Tawnagh
- Templeboy
- Toomour

== Tipperary ==
There are 193 civil parishes in County Tipperary:

- Abington
- Aghacrew
- Aghnameadle
- Aglishcloghane
- Ardcroney
- Ardfinnan
- Ardmayle
- Athnid
- Ballingarry (Ormond Lr)
- Ballingarry (Slieveardagh)
- Ballintemple
- Ballybacon
- Ballycahill
- Ballyclerahan
- Ballygibbon
- Ballygriffin
- Ballymackey
- Ballymurreen
- Ballynaclogh
- Ballysheehan
- Baptistgrange
- Barnane-ely
- Barrettsgrange
- Borrisnafarney
- Borrisokane
- Bourney
- Boytonrath
- Brickendown
- Bruis
- Buolick
- Burgesbeg
- Caher
- Carrick
- Castletownarra
- Clogher
- Cloghprior
- Clonbeg
- Clonbullogue
- Cloneen
- Clonoulty
- Clonpet
- Colman
- Cooleagh
- Coolmundry
- Corbally
- Cordangan
- Corroge
- Crohane
- Cullen
- Cullenwaine
- Dangandargan
- Derrygrath
- Dogstown
- Dolla
- Donaghmore
- Donohill
- Doon
- Dorrha
- Drom
- Drangan
- Dromineer
- Emly
- Erry
- Fennor
- Fertiana
- Fethard
- Finnoe
- Gaile
- Galbooly
- Garrangibbon
- Glenbane
- Glenkeen
- Grangemockler
- Graystown
- Holycross
- Horeabbey
- Inch
- Inishlounaght
- Isertkieran
- Kilbarron
- Kilbragh
- Kilcash
- Kilclonagh
- Kilcomenty
- Kilconnell
- Kilcooly
- Kilcornan
- Kilfeacle
- Kilfithmone
- Kilgrant
- Kilkeary
- Killaloan
- Killardry
- Killavinoge
- Killea
- Killeenasteena
- Killenaule
- Killodiernan
- Killoscully
- Killoskehan
- Kilmastulla
- Kilmore (Kilnamanagh)
- Kilmucklin
- Kilmurry
- Kilmore (Ormond)
- Kilnaneave
- Kilnarath
- Kilpatrick
- Kilruane
- Kilshane
- Kilsheelan
- Kiltegan
- Kiltinan
- Kilvellane
- Kilvemnon
- Knigh
- Knockgraffon
- Latteragh
- Lattin
- Lickfinn
- Lisbunny
- Lismalin
- Lisronagh
- Lorrha
- Loughkeen
- Loughmoe East
- Loughmoe West
- Magorban
- Magowry
- Modeshil
- Modreeny
- Molough
- Monsea
- Mora
- Mortlestown
- Mowney
- Moyaliff
- Moycarky
- Moyne
- Neddans
- Nenagh
- Newcastle
- Newchapel
- Newtownlennan
- Oughterleague
- Outeragh
- Peppardstown
- Rahelty
- Railstown
- Rathcool
- Rathkennan
- Rathlynin
- Rathnaveoge
- Rathronan
- Redcity
- Relickmurry and Athassel
- Rochestown
- Roscrea
- Shanrahan
- Shronell
- Shyane
- Solloghodbeg
- Solloghodmore
- St. John Baptist
- St. Johnstown
- St. Marys, Clonmel
- St. Patricksrock
- Templeachally
- Templebeg
- Templebredon
- Templederry
- Templedowney
- Temple-etney
- Templemichael
- Templemore
- Templeneiry
- Templenoe
- Templeree
- Templetenny
- Templetouhy
- Terryglass
- Thurles
- Tipperary
- Toem
- Tubbrid
- Tullaghmelan
- Tullaghorton
- Tullamain
- Twomileborris
- Upperchurch
- Uskane
- Whitechurch
- Youghalarra

== Tyrone ==
There are 43 civil parishes in County Tyrone:

- Aghaloo
- Aghalurcher (Tyrone portion)
- Arboe
- Ardstraw
- Artrea (Tyrone portion)
- Ballinderry
- Ballyclog
- Bodoney Lower
- Bodoney Upper
- Camus
- Cappagh
- Carnteel
- Clogher
- Clogherny
- Clonfeacle (Tyrone portion)
- Clonoe
- Derryloran (Tyrone portion)
- Desertcreat
- Donacavey
- Donaghedy
- Donaghenry
- Donaghmore
- Dromore
- Drumglass
- Drumragh
- Errigal Keerogue
- Errigal Trough (Tyrone portion)
- Kildress
- Killeeshil
- Killyman
- Kilskeery
- Learmount (Tyrone portion)
- Leckpatrick
- Lissan (Tyrone portion)
- Longfield East
- Longfield West
- Magheracross
- Pomeroy
- Tamlaght
- Termonamongan
- Termonmaguirk
- Tullyniskan
- Urney (Tyrone portion)

== Waterford ==
There are 74 civil parishes in County Waterford:

- Affane
- Aglish
- Ardmore
- Ballygunner
- Ballylaneen
- Ballymacart
- Ballynakill
- Clashmore
- Clonagam
- Clonea
- Colligan
- Corbally
- Crooke
- Drumcannon
- Dungarvan
- Dunhill
- Dysert
- Faithlegg
- Fenoagh
- Fews
- Guilcagh
- Inishlounaght
- Islandikane
- Kilbarry
- Kilbarrymeaden
- Kilbride
- Kilburne
- Kilcaragh
- Kilcockan
- Kilcop
- Kilculliheen
- Kilgobnet
- Kill St. Lawrence
- Kill St. Nicholas
- Killaloan
- Killea
- Killoteran
- Killure
- Kilmacleague
- Kilmacomb
- Kilmeadan
- Kilmolash
- Kilmoleran
- Kilronan (Glenahiry)
- Kilronan (Middlethird)
- Kilrossanty
- Kilrush
- Kilsheelan
- Kilwatermoy
- Kinsalebeg
- Leitrim
- Lickoran
- Lisgenan or Grange
- Lismore and Mocollop
- Lisnakill
- Modelligo
- Monamintra
- Monksland
- Mothel
- Newcastle
- Rathgormuck
- Rathmoylan
- Reisk
- Ringagonagh
- Rossduff
- Rossmire
- Seskinan
- St. Johns Without
- St. Marys Clonmel
- Stradbally
- Tallow
- Templemichael
- Trinity Without
- Whitechurch

== Westmeath ==
There are 63 civil parishes in County Westmeath:

- Ardnurcher or Horseleap
- Ballyloughloe
- Ballymore
- Ballymorin
- Bunown
- Carrick
- Castlelost
- Castletownkindalen
- Churchtown
- Clonarney
- Clonfad
- Conry
- Delvin or Castletowndelvin
- Drumraney
- Durrow
- Dysart
- Enniscoffey
- Faughalstown
- Foyran
- Kilbeggan
- Kilbixy
- Kilbride
- Kilcleagh
- Kilcumny
- Kilcumreragh
- Kilkenny West
- Killagh
- Killare
- Killua
- Killucan
- Killulagh
- Kilmacnevan
- Kilmanaghan
- Kilpatrick
- Lackan
- Leny
- Lickbla
- Lynn
- Mayne
- Moylisker
- Mullingar
- Multyfarnham
- Newtown
- Noughaval
- Pass of Kilbride
- Piercetown
- Portloman
- Portnashangan
- Rahugh
- Rathaspick
- Rathconnell
- Rathconrath
- Rathgarve
- Russagh
- St. Feighin's
- St. Mary's, Fore
- St. Marys, Athlone
- Stonehall
- Street
- Taghmon
- Templeoran
- Templepatrick
- Tyfarnham

== Wexford ==
There are over 135 civil parishes in County Wexford:

- Adamstown
- Ambrosetown
- Ardamine
- Ardcandrisk
- Ardcavan
- Ardcolm
- Artramon
- Ballingly
- Ballyanne
- Ballybrazil
- Ballybrennan
- Ballycanew
- Ballycarney
- Ballyconnick
- Ballyhoge
- Ballyhuskard
- Ballylannan
- Ballymitty
- Ballymore
- Ballynaslaney
- Ballyvaldon
- Ballyvalloo
- Bannow
- Carn
- Carnagh
- Carnew
- Carrick
- Castle-ellis
- Chapel
- Clone
- Clongeen
- Clonleigh
- Clonmines
- Clonmore
- Coolstuff
- Crosspatrick
- Donaghmore
- Doonooney
- Drinagh
- Duncormick
- Edermine
- Ferns
- Fethard
- Hook
- Horetown
- Inch (Gorey)
- Inch (Shelmaliere)
- Ishartmon
- Kerloge
- Kilbride
- Kilbrideglynn
- Kilcavan
- Kilcomb
- Kilcormick
- Kilcowan
- Kilcowanmore
- Kildavin
- Kilgarvan
- Kilgorman
- Killag
- Killann
- Killegney
- Killenagh
- Killesk
- Killiane
- Killila
- Killincooly
- Killinick
- Killisk
- Killurin
- Kilmacree
- Kilmakilloge
- Kilmallock
- Kilmannan
- Kilmokea
- Kilmore
- Kilmuckridge
- Kilnahue
- Kilnamanagh
- Kilnenor
- Kilpatrick
- Kilpipe
- Kilrane
- Kilrush
- Kilscanlan
- Kilscoran
- Kiltennell
- Kiltrisk
- Kilturk
- Ladysisland
- Liskinfere
- Maudlintown
- Mayglass
- Meelnagh
- Monamolin
- Monart
- Moyacomb
- Mulrankin
- Newbawn
- Oldross
- Owenduff
- Rathaspick
- Rathmacknee
- Rathroe
- Rossdroit
- Rosslare
- Rossminoge
- Skreen
- St. Bridgets
- St. Doologues
- St. Helens
- St. Iberius
- St. James and Dunbrody
- St. Johns (Bantry)
- St. Johns, Wexford
- St. Margaret's (Shelmaliere)
- St. Margaret's (Forth)
- St. Mary's Enniscorthy
- St. Mary's Newtownbarry
- St. Mary's, New Ross
- St. Mary's, Wexford
- St. Michael's
- St. Michael's of Feagh
- St. Mullins
- St. Nicholas
- St. Patricks
- St. Peters
- St. Selskars
- Tacumshin
- Taghmon
- Tellarought
- Templeludigan
- Templescoby
- Templeshanbo
- Templeshannon
- Templetown
- Tikillin
- Tintern
- Tomhaggard
- Toome
- Whitechurch
- Whitechurchglynn

== Wicklow ==
There are over 59 civil parishes in County Wicklow:

- Aghowle
- Ardoyne
- Arklow
- Ballinacor
- Ballintemple
- Ballykine
- Ballynure
- Baltinglass
- Blessington
- Boystown
- Bray
- Burgage
- Calary
- Carnew
- Castlemacadam
- Crecrin
- Crehelp
- Crosspatrick
- Delgany
- Derrylossary
- Donaghmore
- Donard
- Drumkay
- Dunganstown
- Dunlavin
- Ennereilly
- Freynestown
- Glenealy
- Hacketstown
- Hollywood
- Inch
- Kilbride (Arklow)
- Kilbride (Talbotstown)
- Kilcommon (Arklow)
- Kilcommon (Ballinacor)
- Kilcoole
- Killahurler
- Killiskey
- Kilmacanoge
- Kilpipe
- Kilpoole
- Kilranelagh
- Kiltegan
- Knockrath
- Liscolman
- Moyacomb
- Moyne
- Mullinacuff
- Newcastle-Lower
- Newcastle-Upper
- Powerscourt
- Preban
- Rathbran
- Rathdrum
- Rathnew
- Rathsallagh
- Rathtoole
- Redcross
- Tober
