= List of townlands of the barony of East Muskerry =

This is a sortable table of the townlands in the barony of Muskerry East, County Cork, Ireland. Duplicate names occur where there is more than one townland with the same name in the barony, and also where a townland is known by two alternative names. Names marked in bold typeface are towns and villages, and the word Town appears for those entries in the area column.

== Townland list ==
Townland	Area (acres)	Barony	Civil parish	Poor law union
Agharinagh	763	East Muskerry	Inishcarra	Cork
Aghavrin	667	East Muskerry	Aghabulloge	Macroom
Aglish	569	East Muskerry	Aglish	Macroom
Aherla Beg	421	East Muskerry	Kilbonane	Bandon
Aherla More	379	East Muskerry	Kilbonane	Bandon
Annagannihy	2,326	East Muskerry	Aghabulloge	Macroom
Ardamadane	237	East Muskerry	Garrycloyne	Cork
Ardrum	596	East Muskerry	Inishcarra	Cork
Aughinida	254	East Muskerry	Aghabulloge	Macroom
**Ballincollig**	Town	East Muskerry	Carrigrohane	Cork
Ballincollig	24	East Muskerry	Kilnaglory	Cork
Ballincollig	746	East Muskerry	Carrigrohane	Cork
Ballincourneenig	385	East Muskerry	Knockavilly	Bandon
Ballineadig	1,034	East Muskerry	Aglish	Macroom
Ballinguilly	298	East Muskerry	Kilnaglory	Cork
Ballinguilly	313	East Muskerry	Moviddy	Bandon
Ballinphellic	726	East Muskerry	Dunderrow	Cork
Ballyanly	498	East Muskerry	Inishcarra	Cork
Ballyburden Beg	255	East Muskerry	Kilnaglory	Cork
Ballyburden More	312	East Muskerry	Kilnaglory	Cork
Ballycunningham	641	East Muskerry	Donaghmore	Macroom
Ballygibbon	450	East Muskerry	Garrycloyne	Cork
Ballygirriha	683	East Muskerry	Donaghmore	Macroom
Ballygroman Lower	495	East Muskerry	Desertmore	Bandon
Ballygroman Upper	589	East Muskerry	Desertmore	Bandon
Ballyhank	318	East Muskerry	Kilnaglory	Cork
Ballyhennessy	142	East Muskerry	Donaghmore	Macroom
Ballyhooleen	614	East Muskerry	Ballinaboy	Cork
Ballykerwick	287	East Muskerry	Donaghmore	Macroom
Ballyleigh	445	East Muskerry	Inishkenny	Cork
Ballymacoo	243	East Muskerry	Inishcarra	Cork
Ballymartin	354	East Muskerry	Grenagh	Cork
Ballymountain	431	East Muskerry	Knockavilly	Bandon
Ballynaraha	277	East Muskerry	Garrycloyne	Cork
Ballyshoneen	524	East Muskerry	Corbally	Cork
Ballyshoneen	685	East Muskerry	Inishcarra	Cork
Ballyvodane	140	East Muskerry	Donaghmore	Macroom
Ballyvongane	237	East Muskerry	Aghinagh	Macroom
Barnagore	201	East Muskerry	Athnowen	Cork
Barrahaurin	2,527	East Muskerry	Donaghmore	Macroom
Bawnatemple	181	East Muskerry	Cannaway	Macroom
Bawnnafinny	143	East Muskerry	Carrigrohanebeg	Cork
Bawnnafinny	80	East Muskerry	Garrycloyne	Cork
Beheena	255	East Muskerry	Aghinagh	Macroom
Bellmount Lower	474	East Muskerry	Moviddy	Bandon
Bellmount Upper	720	East Muskerry	Moviddy	Bandon
Belrose	454	East Muskerry	Knockavilly	Bandon
Berrings	1,056	East Muskerry	Inishcarra	Cork
**Blarney**	Town	East Muskerry	Garrycloyne	Cork
Blarney	206	East Muskerry	Garrycloyne	Cork
Boolypatrick	232	East Muskerry	Garrycloyne	Cork
Bridgestown	276	East Muskerry	Inishcarra	Cork
Bunkilla	393	East Muskerry	Donaghmore	Macroom
Caherbaroul	426	East Muskerry	Aghabulloge	Macroom
Callas	352	East Muskerry	Inishcarra	Cork
Cappanagraun	259	East Muskerry	Aghinagh	Macroom
Carhoo Lower	284	East Muskerry	Magourney	Macroom
Carhoo Upper	199	East Muskerry	Magourney	Macroom
Carhue	391	East Muskerry	Inishcarra	Cork
Carrigadrohid	559	East Muskerry	Aghinagh	Macroom
Carrigane	35	East Muskerry	Athnowen	Cork
Carriganish	432	East Muskerry	Aghinagh	Macroom
Carrigeen	284	East Muskerry	Moviddy	Bandon
Carrignamuck	363	East Muskerry	Magourney	Macroom
Carrigrohanebeg	156	East Muskerry	Carrigrohanebeg	Cork
Carrigthomas	347	East Muskerry	Aghabulloge	Macroom
Carrigyknaveen	234	East Muskerry	Inishcarra	Cork
Castleinch	372	East Muskerry	Athnowen	Cork
Castlemore	356	East Muskerry	Moviddy	Bandon
Caum	421	East Muskerry	Aghinagh	Macroom
Clashanaffrin	297	East Muskerry	Desertmore	Bandon
Clashanure	574	East Muskerry	Athnowen	Cork
Classes	149	East Muskerry	Athnowen	Cork
Classes	152	East Muskerry	Cannaway	Macroom
Cloghduff	239	East Muskerry	Kilbonane	Bandon
Clogheenmilcon	581	East Muskerry	Garrycloyne	Cork
Cloghphilip	564	East Muskerry	Matehy	Cork
Cloghroe	690	East Muskerry	Matehy	Cork
Clonavrick	313	East Muskerry	Aghabulloge	Macroom
Clonmoyle East	756	East Muskerry	Aghabulloge	Macroom
Clonmoyle West	774	East Muskerry	Aghabulloge	Macroom
Clontead Beg	227	East Muskerry	Magourney	Macroom
Clontead More	339	East Muskerry	Magourney	Macroom
**Coachford**	Town	East Muskerry	Magourney	Macroom
Commeenaplaw	415	East Muskerry	Donaghmore	Macroom
Commons	74	East Muskerry	Moviddy	Bandon
Coolacareen	195	East Muskerry	Aghinagh	Macroom
Coolacoosane	183	East Muskerry	Aghinagh	Macroom
Coolacullig	521	East Muskerry	Magourney	Macroom
Coolalta	213	East Muskerry	Aghinagh	Macroom
Coolatanavally	360	East Muskerry	Carrigrohanebeg	Cork
Coolatooder	426	East Muskerry	Dunderrow	Cork
Coolatubbrid	141	East Muskerry	Carrigrohanebeg	Cork
Cooldrum	189	East Muskerry	Cannaway	Macroom
Coolflugh	415	East Muskerry	Matehy	Cork
Coolgarriff	490	East Muskerry	Aghinagh	Macroom
Coolineagh	425	East Muskerry	Aghabulloge	Macroom
Coolkisha	296	East Muskerry	Aghinagh	Macroom
Coollicka	517	East Muskerry	Donaghmore	Macroom
Coolmona	802	East Muskerry	Donaghmore	Macroom
Coolmucky	811	East Muskerry	Moviddy	Bandon
Coolnacarriga	190	East Muskerry	Cannaway	Macroom
Coolnagearagh	293	East Muskerry	Aghinagh	Macroom
Coolnashamroge	146	East Muskerry	Cannaway	Macroom
Coolnasoon	125	East Muskerry	Cannaway	Macroom
Coolroe	234	East Muskerry	Carrigrohane	Cork
Coolyduff	449	East Muskerry	Carrigrohanebeg	Cork
Corbally	372	East Muskerry	Corbally	Cork
Corran	1,006	East Muskerry	Dunderrow	Cork
Courtbrack	817	East Muskerry	Matehy	Cork
Cronody	476	East Muskerry	Aglish	Macroom
Currabeha	326	East Muskerry	Inishcarra	Cork
Curraghanearla	437	East Muskerry	Aghinagh	Macroom
Curraghawaddra	396	East Muskerry	Aghinagh	Macroom
Curraghbeg	1,078	East Muskerry	Athnowen	Cork
Curraghennbrien	209	East Muskerry	Kilbonane	Bandon
Curraghnalaght	430	East Muskerry	Garrycloyne	Cork
Currahaly	1,036	East Muskerry	Aglish	Macroom
Curraleigh	372	East Muskerry	Inishcarra	Cork
Dawstown	341	East Muskerry	Matehy	Cork
Dawstown	502	East Muskerry	Garrycloyne	Cork
Deelish	341	East Muskerry	Aghabulloge	Macroom
Deeshart	101	East Muskerry	Magourney	Macroom
Derreen	378	East Muskerry	Magourney	Macroom
Derry	611	East Muskerry	Donaghmore	Macroom
Derryroe	505	East Muskerry	Aghabulloge	Macroom
Dooneens	780	East Muskerry	Aghabulloge	Macroom
**Dripsey Lower**	Town	East Muskerry	Inishcarra	Cork
**Dripsey Upper**	Town	East Muskerry	Inishcarra	Cork
Dromacullen	206	East Muskerry	Aghinagh	Macroom
Dromasmole	217	East Muskerry	Carrigrohanebeg	Cork
Dromatimore	429	East Muskerry	Aghabulloge	Macroom
Drombeg	371	East Muskerry	Aghinagh	Macroom
Dromgownagh	200	East Muskerry	Inishcarra	Cork
Dromin	263	East Muskerry	Matehy	Cork
Faha	443	East Muskerry	Inishcarra	Cork
Farnanes	580	East Muskerry	Moviddy	Bandon
Farran	1,072	East Muskerry	Aglish	Macroom
Farranavarra	60	East Muskerry	Aglish	Macroom
Farranduff	15	East Muskerry	Moviddy	Bandon
Fergus	407	East Muskerry	Aglish	Macroom
Fergus	557	East Muskerry	Magourney	Macroom
Fornaght	662	East Muskerry	Donaghmore	Macroom
Garraneleigh	249	East Muskerry	Moviddy	Bandon
Garranenamuddagh	289	East Muskerry	Moviddy	Bandon
Garranewaterig	483	East Muskerry	Knockavilly	Bandon
Garraunredmond	492	East Muskerry	Donaghmore	Macroom
Garravagh	469	East Muskerry	Inishcarra	Cork
Garryhesty	839	East Muskerry	Desertmore	Bandon
Gilcagh	541	East Muskerry	Matehy	Cork
Glebe	69	East Muskerry	Magourney	Macroom
Glenaglogh North	618	East Muskerry	Aghabulloge	Macroom
Glenaglogh South	667	East Muskerry	Aghabulloge	Macroom
Gogganshill	913	East Muskerry	Ballinaboy	Cork
Gortacroghig	190	East Muskerry	Aghabulloge	Macroom
Gortatray	147	East Muskerry	Inishcarra	Cork
Gortdonaghmore	595	East Muskerry	Matehy	Cork
Gortnaclogh	574	East Muskerry	Dunderrow	Cork
Gowlane North	1,184	East Muskerry	Donaghmore	Macroom
Gowlane South	531	East Muskerry	Donaghmore	Macroom
Grange	647	East Muskerry	Athnowen	Bandon
Great Island	72	East Muskerry	Carrigrohane	Cork
Greenfield	256	East Muskerry	Kilnaglory	Cork
Gurteen	176	East Muskerry	Inishcarra	Cork
Inchaleagh	292	East Muskerry	Aghinagh	Macroom
Inchirahilly	474	East Muskerry	Moviddy	Bandon
Inchirahilly	70	East Muskerry	Kilmurry	Bandon
Inishleena	60	East Muskerry	Inishcarra	Cork
Kilbane	281	East Muskerry	Desertmore	Bandon
Kilberrihert	942	East Muskerry	Aghabulloge	Macroom
Kilblaffer	566	East Muskerry	Inishcarra	Cork
Kilbonane	185	East Muskerry	Kilbonane	Bandon
Kilbrenan	461	East Muskerry	Moviddy	Bandon
Kilclogh	754	East Muskerry	Matehy	Cork
Kilcolman	90	East Muskerry	Magourney	Macroom
Kilcondy	165	East Muskerry	Moviddy	Bandon
Kilcondy	88	East Muskerry	Kilmurry	Bandon
Kilcrea	965	East Muskerry	Desertmore	Bandon
Kilcullen North	790	East Muskerry	Donaghmore	Macroom
Kilcullen South	926	East Muskerry	Donaghmore	Macroom
Kilgobnet	310	East Muskerry	Magourney	Macroom
Kill	224	East Muskerry	Knockavilly	Bandon
Killeen	264	East Muskerry	Matehy	Cork
Killeenleigh	592	East Muskerry	Donaghmore	Macroom
Killinardrish	310	East Muskerry	Cannaway	Macroom
Killowen	601	East Muskerry	Garrycloyne	Cork
Killumney	279	East Muskerry	St. Finbar's	Bandon
Kilmartin Lower	367	East Muskerry	Donaghmore	Macroom
Kilmartin Upper	538	East Muskerry	Donaghmore	Macroom
Kilmurry	25	East Muskerry	Inishcarra	Cork
Kilnaglory	437	East Muskerry	Kilnaglory	Cork
Kilnamucky	257	East Muskerry	Matehy	Cork
Knockacorbally	216	East Muskerry	Garrycloyne	Cork
Knockacroghera	455	East Muskerry	Aghinagh	Macroom
Knockanare	340	East Muskerry	Donaghmore	Macroom
Knockane	280	East Muskerry	Inishcarra	Cork
Knockaneamealgulla	237	East Muskerry	Desertmore	Bandon
Knockaneleigh	284	East Muskerry	Kilbonane	Bandon
Knockanemore	962	East Muskerry	Athnowen	Cork
Knockanenagark	165	East Muskerry	Magourney	Macroom
Knockaneowen	72	East Muskerry	Magourney	Macroom
Knockaneroe	439	East Muskerry	Moviddy	Bandon
Knockaphreaghane	374	East Muskerry	Knockavilly	Bandon
Knockatreenane	237	East Muskerry	Desertmore	Bandon
Knockavullig	465	East Muskerry	Cannaway	Macroom
Knockawaddra	228	East Muskerry	Kilbonane	Bandon
Knockburden	231	East Muskerry	Kilnaglory	Cork
Knockeenacuttin	157	East Muskerry	Aghinagh	Macroom
Knockglass	290	East Muskerry	Aghabulloge	Macroom
Knocknagoul	492	East Muskerry	Aglish	Macroom
Knocknagoun	1,385	East Muskerry	Aghabulloge	Macroom
Knocknahilan	338	East Muskerry	Kilbonane	Bandon
Knocknamarriff	191	East Muskerry	Inishcarra	Cork
Knocknasuff	444	East Muskerry	Garrycloyne	Cork
Knockpoge	146	East Muskerry	Kilnaglory	Cork
Knockrour	937	East Muskerry	Aghabulloge	Macroom
Knockshanawee	611	East Muskerry	Aglish	Bandon
Knockyrourke	316	East Muskerry	Donaghmore	Macroom
Lackabane	576	East Muskerry	Donaghmore	Macroom
Lackavunaknick	200	East Muskerry	Aghinagh	Macroom
Lackenareague	189	East Muskerry	Athnowen	Cork
Lackenshoneen	410	East Muskerry	Carrigrohanebeg	Cork
Lacknahaghny	369	East Muskerry	Aghabulloge	Macroom
Laharankeal	182	East Muskerry	Aghabulloge	Macroom
Leadawillin	455	East Muskerry	Aghabulloge	Macroom
Leckaneen	147	East Muskerry	Aghabulloge	Macroom
Leemount	103	East Muskerry	Magourney	Macroom
Lehenagh	404	East Muskerry	Cannaway	Macroom
Lisheens	11	East Muskerry	Kilnaglory	Cork
Lisheens	118	East Muskerry	Athnowen	Cork
Lisladeen	422	East Muskerry	Inishcarra	Cork
Lismahane	161	East Muskerry	Inishcarra	Cork
Lisnashandrum East	129	East Muskerry	Inishcarra	Cork
Lisnashandrum West	102	East Muskerry	Inishcarra	Cork
Loughane East	501	East Muskerry	Matehy	Cork
Loughane West	541	East Muskerry	Matehy	Cork
Loughleigh	512	East Muskerry	Cannaway	Macroom
Lyroe	490	East Muskerry	Aghabulloge	Macroom
Maglin	331	East Muskerry	St. Nicholas	Cork
Magooly	432	East Muskerry	Inishcarra	Cork
Mahallagh	276	East Muskerry	Cannaway	Macroom
Mashanaglass	935	East Muskerry	Aghinagh	Macroom
Meenahony	996	East Muskerry	Donaghmore	Macroom
Meeshal	215	East Muskerry	Magourney	Macroom
Monacnapa	268	East Muskerry	Garrycloyne	Cork
Monallig	252	East Muskerry	Cannaway	Macroom
Monareagh	159	East Muskerry	Magourney	Macroom
Monataggart	372	East Muskerry	Donaghmore	Macroom
Monavanshere	178	East Muskerry	Donaghmore	Macroom
Moneyflugh	224	East Muskerry	Inishcarra	Cork
Mountrivers	473	East Muskerry	Aghabulloge	Macroom
Mullaghroe	204	East Muskerry	Athnowen	Cork
Mylane	598	East Muskerry	St. Finbar's	Bandon
Nadrid	545	East Muskerry	Magourney	Macroom
Nettleville Demesne	508	East Muskerry	Cannaway	Macroom
Oldabbey	347	East Muskerry	Inishkenny	Cork
Oldcastle	417	East Muskerry	Magourney	Macroom
Oughtihery	1,031	East Muskerry	Aghabulloge	Macroom
Parkmore	172	East Muskerry	Kilbonane	Bandon
Peake	361	East Muskerry	Aghabulloge	Macroom
Raheen	372	East Muskerry	Knockavilly	Bandon
Rathard	773	East Muskerry	Kilbonane	Bandon
Rathcoola East	554	East Muskerry	Donaghmore	Macroom
Rathcoola West	493	East Muskerry	Donaghmore	Macroom
Rathculleen	225	East Muskerry	Kilbonane	Bandon
Rathfelane	237	East Muskerry	Kilbonane	Bandon
Rathnonoane	408	East Muskerry	Cannaway	Macroom
Ravakeel	77	East Muskerry	Kilnaglory	Cork
Reagrellagh	358	East Muskerry	Inishcarra	Cork
Rearour	60	East Muskerry	Kilbonane	Bandon
Rockgrove	189	East Muskerry	Magourney	Macroom
Rooves Beg	396	East Muskerry	Aglish	Macroom
Rooves More	612	East Muskerry	Aglish	Macroom
Rosnascalp	215	East Muskerry	Aghinagh	Macroom
Rusheen	287	East Muskerry	Aghabulloge	Macroom
Russelhill	656	East Muskerry	Knockavilly	Bandon
Ryecourt	283	East Muskerry	Moviddy	Bandon
Rylane	1,340	East Muskerry	Aghabulloge	Macroom
Scart Lower	109	East Muskerry	Kilbonane	Bandon
Scart Upper	301	East Muskerry	Kilbonane	Bandon
Scarteen	217	East Muskerry	Donaghmore	Macroom
Shanakill	461	East Muskerry	Aghinagh	Macroom
Shanavagha	107	East Muskerry	Aghinagh	Macroom
Shandangan East	605	East Muskerry	Cannaway	Macroom
Shandangan West	494	East Muskerry	Cannaway	Macroom
Shean Lower	237	East Muskerry	Garrycloyne	Cork
Shean Upper	230	East Muskerry	Garrycloyne	Cork
Sraleigh	164	East Muskerry	Inishkenny	Cork
Tullig Beg	73	East Muskerry	Magourney	Macroom
Tullig More	481	East Muskerry	Magourney	Macroom
Tuocusheen	279	East Muskerry	Knockavilly	Bandon
Ummera	1,117	East Muskerry	Aghinagh	Macroom
Vicarstown	546	East Muskerry	Matehy	Cork
Walshestown	303	East Muskerry	Athnowen	Cork
Warrensgrove	138	East Muskerry	Moviddy	Bandon
Windsor	692	East Muskerry	Kilnaglory	Cork
Woodfield	213	East Muskerry	Aghabulloge	Macroom
Woodside	181	East Muskerry	Carrigrohanebeg	Cork

== See also ==
- Lists of townlands of County Cork
- List of civil parishes of County Cork
