= Charles Roberts =

Charles Roberts may refer to:

== Companies ==
- Charles Roberts and Co., rolling stock factory works based in Horbury, England

== People ==
=== Military servicepeople ===
- Charles Roberts (soldier, died 1816) (c. 1772 – 1816), British Army officer
- Charles Church Roberts (1882–1957), US Navy sailor
- Charles DuVal Roberts (1873–1966), US Army brigadier general
- Charles Fyshe Roberts (1837–1914), under-secretary of defence in colonial New South Wales
- Charles W. Roberts (1828–1898), colonel in the Union Army during the American Civil War

=== Politicians ===
- Pat Roberts (Charles Patrick Roberts, born 1936), US senator from Kansas
- Charles Henry Crompton-Roberts (1832–1891), British member of parliament for Sandwich
- Charles Roberts (British politician) (1865–1959), British Liberal politician
- Charles B. Roberts (1842–1899), US congressman from Maryland
- Charles James Roberts (1846–1925), publican, politician and postmaster-general in New South Wales, Australia
- Charles H. Roberts (1872–1967), American dentist and politician in New York
- Charles M. Roberts (1866–1932), American politician in Arizona
- Charlie Roberts (politician) (born 1953), American politician, member of the Florida House of Representatives

=== Sportspeople ===
- Specs Roberts (Charles W. Roberts, 1907–1984), American Negro leagues baseball player
- Charles Roberts (Canadian football) (born 1979), Canadian football player
- Charlie Roberts (footballer) (Charles Roberts, 1883–1939), English footballer
- Les Roberts (footballer) (Charles Leslie Roberts, 1901–1980), English footballer

=== Other people ===
- Charles Roberts (archdeacon of St Asaph) (1862–1942), Welsh Anglican priest
- Charles Roberts (archdeacon of Cork)
- Charles Carl Roberts (1973–2006), perpetrator of the West Nickel Mines School shooting in Pennsylvania, US
- Charles E. Roberts (1843–1934), engineer and inventor; client and patron of Frank Lloyd Wright
- Charles E. Roberts (writer) (1894–1951), American screenwriter and film director
- Charles E. Roberts (mathematician) (1942–2023), American mathematician
- Charles G. D. Roberts (1860–1943), Canadian poet and author
- Charles Hubert Roberts (1865–1929), British surgeon, physician and lecturer
- Luckey Roberts (Charles Luckyth Roberts, 1887–1968), American composer and stride pianist
- Charles S. Roberts (1930–2010), wargame and board game creator and railroad historian
- Chuck Roberts (Charles S. Roberts, born 1950), American news anchor

== See also ==
- Charles Robartes, 2nd Earl of Radnor (1660–1723)
