= Aglish (disambiguation) =

Aglish is a village in County Waterford, Ireland.

Aglish may also refer to several other places in Ireland:*

- A townland in County Clare; see List of townlands of County Clare
- Aglish, County Cork, a civil parish
- A townland in County Kerry; see List of townlands of County Kerry
- A townland in County Mayo; see List of townlands of County Mayo
- Aglish, County Tipperary, a small settlement

* 'Aglish' is from the Irish 'Eaglais', meaning 'church'
