= Newchapel =

Newchapel may refer to:

- Newchapel, Staffordshire, a village in the Borough of Newcastle-under-Lyme, Staffordshire, England
  - Newchapel (ward), a ward in the Borough of Newcastle-under-Lyme
- Newchapel, Surrey, a village near East Grinstead, England
- Newchapel, County Tipperary, a civil parish in Ballytarsna, Clonmel, County Tipperary, Ireland
- Newchapel, Pembrokeshire, a hamlet in the community of Manordeifi, Pembrokeshire, Wales
- Newchapel, Powys, a location in the UK in Powys, Wales
