= William Galwey =

William Galwey (1 June 1762 – 18 September 1848) was an Anglican priest in Ireland during the late decade of the 18th century and the first four of the 19th.

He was born in County Kilkenny and educated at Trinity College Dublin. He was appointed Archdeacon of Cashel in 1807. He resigned in 1824 to become the incumbent at Kilmastulla.
