= Charles Crow =

Charles Crow or Crowe may refer to:

- Charles Crow (bishop) (died 1726), Irish Episcopalian bishop
- Charles A. Crow (1873–1938), American politician
- Charlie Crow (fl. 1970s–1990s), Canadian disc jockey and politician
- Charles Crowe (1867–1953), Canadian sport shooter
- Charlie Crowe (1924–2010), English footballer
