= Muskerry East =

Barony in County Cork, Ireland

Coordinates: 51.91°N 8.82°W

Muskerry East (Irish: Múscraí Thoir (Note: Muskerry East)) is one of the baronies of Ireland, a historical geographical unit of land. Its chief town is Ballincollig. It is one of 24 baronies in County Cork. It may also be viewed as a half barony because some time before the 1821 census data, it was divided from its other half – Muskerry West. Neighbouring baronies include Cork to the east (surrounding the city of Cork), Duhallow to the north (whose chief town is Newmarket), and the barony of Barretts to the northeast.

== Legal context ==
Baronies were created after the Norman invasion of Ireland as divisions of counties and were used the administration of justice and the raising of revenue. While baronies continue to be officially defined units, they have been administratively obsolete since 1898. However, they continue to be used in land registration and in specification, such as in planning permissions. In many cases, a barony corresponds to an earlier Gaelic túath which had submitted to the Crown. This is true in the case of the Muskerry baronies whose origins go back the ancient kingdom of Múscraige - see History below.

== History ==
The Múscraige and Corcu Duibne descend form Corc, a son of Cairbre Musc. While the Múscraige petty kingdoms were scattered throughout the province of Munster, the largest were centred on the present baronies of Muskerry (West and East). The tribes or septs were pre-Eóganachta, that is before the 6th century. At this time, the territory did not extend south of the River Lee (although the river bisects the current barony). A pedigree of the chieftains of the tribe may be found in the Book of Leinster. The main septs were:

Irish name of the túath	Equivalent barony	County
Múscraige Tíre	Ormond Lower and Owney and Arra	County Tipperary
Múscraige Breógain	Clanwilliam	County Tipperary
Múscraige Tri Maighe	Orrery and Kilmore and part of the barony of Duhallow	County Cork
Múscraige Mittaine	Muskerry East, Muskerry West and Barretts	County Cork
Múscraighe Aodha (alias Múscraighe Luachra)	Various baronies	Counties Cork, Tipperary and Limerick

Rivalry between the princely houses of the outer circle of the Eóganacht would eventually undo the kingdom of Múscraighe Mittaine. The O'Donoghues, originally from Eóganacht Raithlind, moved in to become the new princes of Eóganacht Locha Léin. This forced the erstwhile rulers of Locha Léin - the O'Flynns - to migrate eastwards. Sometime after 1096, Múscraighe Mittaine fell to the O'Flynns . The local Ó Donnagáin dynasty persisted in their opposition to the usurpers, at least until 1115 when they killed the reigning O'Flynn king of Muskerry. Thereafter, both dynasties were united in obscurity. From 1118 onwards, the kings of Desmond came from the leading family of Eóganacht Chaisil - the MacCarthy dynasty. The reigning king at the time of the Norman invasion of Ireland was Dermod Mór na Cill Baghain MacCarthy, who, in 1171 submitted to King Henry II of England. In so doing, he hoped to secure the king's protection for his lands, particularly from Henry's own barons, as was the Gaelic way. Instead, Henry granted of Dermod's entire kingdom to two of his leading adventurer knights - Robert Fitz-Stephen and Milo de Cogan - in 1177. According to Giraldus, the grantees took possession of seven cantreds only; three to the east of Cork city were allocated to Fitz-Stephen and four to the west to de Cogan. The remaining twenty four cantreds they allowed to MacCarthy at rent.

An invasion into Múscraighe Mittaine in 1201 in reported in the Annals of Inisfallen as follows:

AI1201.12: A mighty hosting this year in Desmumu by William and other foreigners, together with the royalty of all Mumu, i.e. including Muirchertach Ua Briain, Conchobar Ruad, and Donnchad Cairprech, and many others, and their plundering parties were sent against Múscraige Mittaine, and they committed great depredations. They proceeded thence to Cenn Eich, spent a week there, and made great raids and burned corn crops in every place they came to.

As neither Fitz-Stephen nor de Cogan left male heirs, the inheritance was confused. This suited the purposes of King John of England who, when he came to the throne, was determined to weaken the power of the Irish barons. He sequestered the kingdom of Desmond to the English crown and from 1200 to 1207 he proceeded to parcel out the land among his loyal subjects. Richard de Cogan (son of Milo's brother, Richard) got Múscraighe Mittaine which he was expected to win by the sword. The Cogans conquered most of this area, building castles at Mourne Abbey, Maglin (near Ballincollig), Dundrinan, (Castlemore near Cookstown), Dooniskey, Mahallagh, and Macroom. About 1242 John de Cogan (Richard's son) had the patronage of the churches of Clondrohid, Matehy, and Kilshannig. In 1254–5, "Muscryemychene" was one of the cantreds to pay a compotum of 40/- so that the county sessions might be held there.

Following the Battle of Callann, the McCarthies successfully repulsed the Cambo-Normans although their leader Fínghin Mac Carthaigh was slain. In 1280 the MacCarthy Reagh sept of Carbery made peace with the main branch of the family, whose king was Domhnall Ruadh MacCarthy, the nephew of Fínghin Mac Carthaigh. They apportioned Desmond amongst themselves. The Cogans gradually lost their power and lands in Muskerry. Efforts by the viceroys Lionel and Rokeby to recover Cogan lands from the MacCarthys in east Muskerry failed. In 1398 the Mac Carthys were not alone free to plunder from Dingle to the territory of the Barretts, but could carry on their ancient feud against the Carbery MacCarthys at Carrigrohane.

== Civil parishes ==
There are 25 civil parishes either wholly or partly in the barony.

Civil parish Irish name	Civil parish English name
Achadh Bolg	Aghabulloge
Achadh Fhíonach	Aghinagh
Áth na nUamhann	Athnowen
Baile na Baoi	Ballinaboy
Carraig Ruacháin Bheag	Carrigrohanebeg
Carraig Ruacháin	Carrigrohane
Ceannmhaigh	Cannaway
Cill Bheanáin	Kilbonane
Cill Muire	Kilmurry
Cill na Gluaire	Kilnaglory
Cnoc an Bhile	Knockavilly
An Corrbhaile	Corbally
An Díseart Mór	Desertmore
Domhnach Mór	Donoughmore
Dún Darú	Dunderrow
An Eaglais	Aglish
Garbhchluain	Garrycloyne
Greanach	Grenagh
Inis Cara	Inniscarra
Inis Cionaoith	Inishkenny
Maigh Guairne	Magourney
Maigh Mhide	Moviddy
Maigh Teichigh	Matehy
Paróiste Fhionnbharra	St. Finbar's
Paróiste San Nioclás	St. Nicholas

Note 1: Parishes shared with the neighbouring barony of Cork city to the east.

- The western half of Carrigrohane parishes lies in this barony while the eastern half lies in the barony of Cork city.
- The parish of St. Nicholas consists of a single townland that is an exclave of the parish proper which lies in the barony of Cork city.
- The parish of St. Finbar's consists of two townlands that form an exclave of the parish proper which lies in the barony of Cork city.
- A single townland (Ballynora) of the parish of Kilnaglory lies in the barony of Cork city.
- Three townlands of the parish of Inishkenny lie in the barony; the bulk of the parish lies in the barony of Cork city.
- The parish of Ballinaboy is divided between four baronies. Only two townlands lie in this barony.

Note 2: Parishes shared with the neighbouring barony of Kinalea to the south.

- Four townlands of the parish of Dunderrow lie in the barony; a further five lie to the south in the neighbouring barony of Kinalea. Additional townlands of the parish are situated further south again in a large exclave of the same barony with some contiguous townlands also lying in a third barony still further south - Kinsale.
- Nine out of fifteen townlands of the parish of Knockavilly lie in the barony with the remaining six contiguous townlands lying in the barony of Kinalea.

Note 3: Parishes shared with the neighbouring barony of Muskerry West to the west.

- Two out of twenty four townlands of the parish of Kilmurry lie in the barony with the remaining twenty two contiguous townlands lying in the barony of Muskerry West.

Note 4: Parishes shared with the neighbouring barony of Barretts to the north-east.

- Eleven out of forty townlands of the parish of Donaghmore lie in the barony with the remaining twenty nine contiguous townlands lying in the barony of Barretts.
- Fifteen out of seventeen townlands of the parish of Garrycloyne lie in the barony. The remaining two contiguous townlands, including its eponymous townland, lie in the barony of Barretts.

== Features ==
- Carrigaphooca Castle

== See also ==
- List of civil parishes of County Cork
- List of townlands of the barony of East Muskerry in County Cork
- MacCarthy of Muskerry
- Muskerry GAA, a club in Cork GAA
