= Slievardagh =

Barony in County Tipperary, Ireland

Slievardagh (Irish: Sliabh Ardach) is a barony in County Tipperary, Ireland. This geographical unit of land is one of 12 baronies in County Tipperary. Its chief town is Mullinahone. The barony lies between Eliogarty to the north (whose chief town is Thurles), Iffa and Offa East to the south (whose chief town is Clonmel) and Middle Third to the west (whose chief town is Cashel). It is currently administered by Tipperary County Council.

== Legal context ==
Baronies were created after the Norman invasion of Ireland as divisions of counties and were used the administration of justice and the raising of revenue. While baronies continue to be officially defined units, they have been administratively obsolete since 1898. However, they continue to be used in land registration and in specification, such as in planning permissions. In many cases, a barony corresponds to an earlier Gaelic túath which had submitted to the Crown.

== Modern times ==
When County Tipperary was split into North and South Ridings in 1836, Slievardagh was allocated to the south riding. However, the neighbouring barony of Kilnamanagh was split into Upper and Lower half-baronies, being allocated to the north and south ridings respectively.

== Towns, villages and townlands of the barony ==
=== Civil parishes of the barony ===
This table lists an historical geographical sub-division of the barony known as the civil parish (not to be confused with an Ecclesiastical parish).

Name in Irish	Name in English
Baile an Gharraí	Ballingarry
Baile an Ghraeigh	Graystown
Baile Nua an Loinneáin	Newtownlennan
Buailic	Buolick
Cill Chúile	Kilcooly
Cill Mheanmnáin	Kilvemnon
Cill Náile	Killenaule
An Cluainín	Cloneen
Cruachán	Crohane
Díseart Chiaráin	Isertkieran
Fionnúir	Fennor
Garrán Ghiobúin	Garrangibbon
Gráinseach Mhóicléir	Grangemockler
Leic Fhinn	Lickfinn
Lios Moling	Lismalin
Maigh Abhna	Mowney
Maigh Dheisil	Modeshil
Paróiste Eoin Baiste	St. Johnbaptist
Teampall Mhichíl	Templemichael

== See also ==
- List of civil parishes of South Tipperary
