= Ballytarsna =

Ballytarsna is the name of townlands in several counties in Ireland. It may refer to:

- Ballytarsna, County Carlow
- Ballytarsna, County Clare
- Ballytarsna, County Kilkenny
- Ballytarsna, County Laois
- Ballytarsna, County Roscommon
- Ballytarsna, County Tipperary (disambiguation), several places
- Ballytarsna, County Wexford
