= Charles Crow (bishop) =

Irish Anglican bishop

Charles Crow was Bishop of Cloyne from 1702 until his death on 26 June 1726.

Crow was born in Jurby and educated at Trinity College, Dublin. He was a teacher then head master at St. Patrick's School in Dublin. He was afterwards Chaplain to Laurence, Earl of Rochester, Lord Lieutenant of Ireland. He was also Rector of Coolbanagher until his episcopal appointment.
