= Kilcooly (civil parish) =

Civil parish in County Tipperary, Ireland

Kilcooly (Irish: Cill Chúile) is a civil parish in the barony of Slievardagh., County Tipperary.

== See also ==
- List of civil parishes of County Tipperary
