= Templemichael =

Civil parish in County Tipperary, Ireland

Templemichael (Irish: Teampall Mhichíl) is a civil parish in the barony of Slievardagh, County Tipperary, in Ireland. Historically, it was in the Poor Law Union of "Carrick-on-Suir & Callan". It is situated in the Roman Catholic Diocese of Waterford and Lismore.

== Townlands of the civil parish ==
Townland (Irish)	Townland (English)
Baile an Bhioraigh, Caisleán Sheáin, An Cheapach, Coill Inse, An Cruán, Cúil Uí Earcáin, Currach Saileach Íochtarach, Currach Saileach Uachtarach, Gort an Chnoic, An Mhóin Chrua, An Mongán, Radharc na Carraige, Teampall Mhichíl, Tigh na Naoi Míle	Ballinvir, Castlejohn, Cappagh, Killinch, Croan, Coolarkin, Currasilla Lower, Currasilla Upper, Gortknock, Hardbog, Mangan, Rockview, Templemichael, Ninemilehouse

== See also ==
- List of civil parishes of County Tipperary
