= Tullaghorton =

Civil parish in Iffa and Offa West

Coordinates: 52.154°N 7.565°W

Tullaghorton is a civil parish in the Barony of Iffa and Offa West, County Tipperary, Province of Munster Ireland.

== See also ==
- List of civil parishes of County Tipperary
