= Ballytarsna, County Tipperary =

Ballytarsna, County Tipperary, may refer to:

- Ballytarsna, Clonmel, County Tipperary
- Ballytarsna, Cashel, County Tipperary
