= Charles Roberts (archdeacon of Cork) =

Charles Benjamin Pigott Roberts was Archdeacon of Cork from 1967 until 1971.

Roberts was educated at Trinity College, Dublin and ordained in 1938. After a curacies in Templemichael, County Cork, he held incumbencies at Teampol, Carrigrohane, and Shandon. He was Treasurer of Cork Cathedral from 1964 until his appointment as Archdeacon.
