= Ardmayle =

Ardmayle Árd Máil
- Village
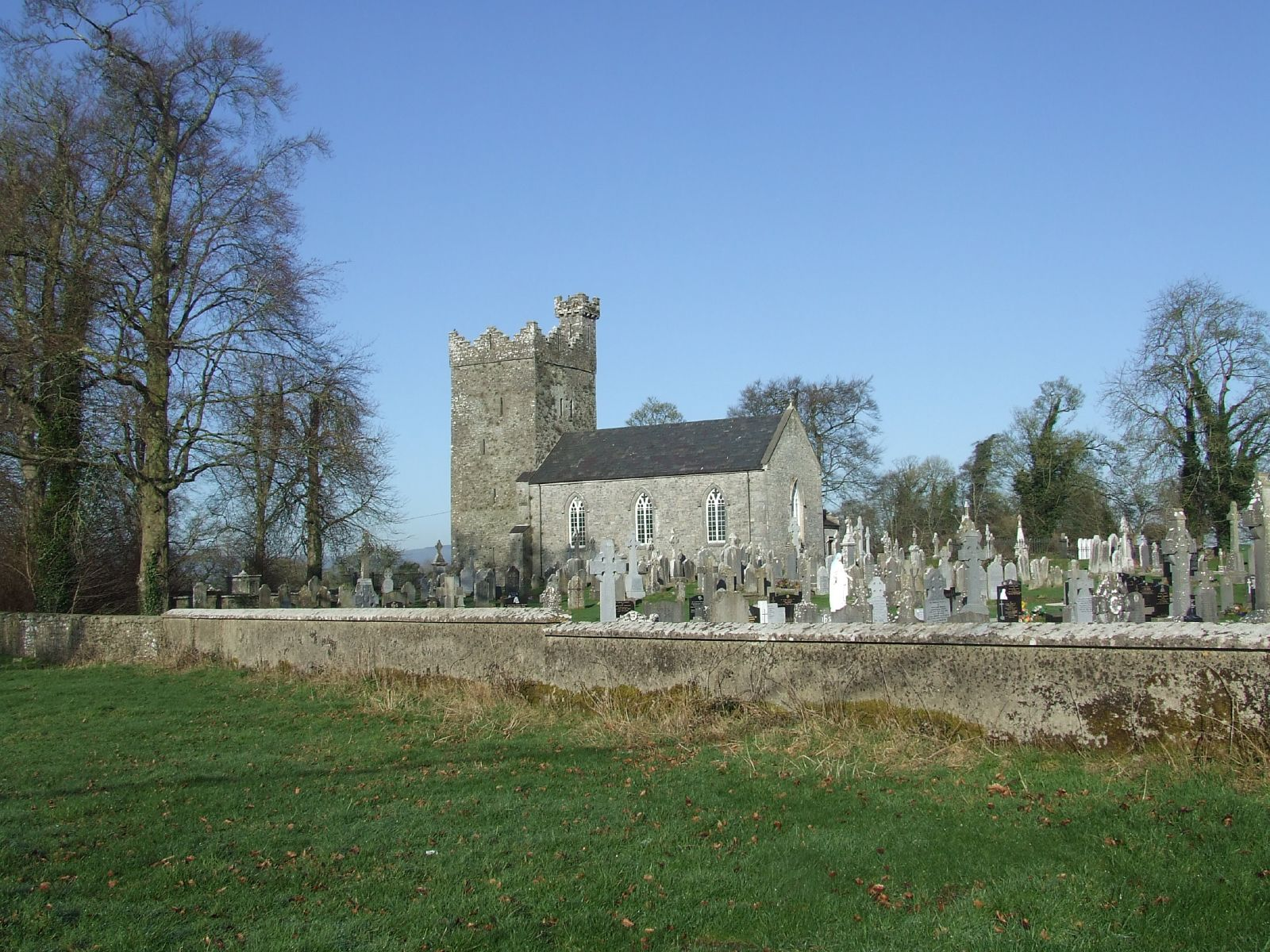
- Ardmayle Church

- Ardmayle's location in Ireland
- Coordinates: 52.565584°N 7.922855°W
- Country: Ireland
- Province: Munster
- County: Tipperary

Ardmayle (Irish: Árd Máil) is a civil parish, village and townland in County Tipperary, Ireland. It is situated near Boherlahan, Goolds Cross and Cashel. It is located on the River Suir and was once served by a railway station on the Goolds Cross Cashel railway. It was the only stop between the two stations.

== Location ==
Ardmayle is situated approximately 6 km from Cashel, which is accessible from the local road that goes through the village.

== Notable people ==
- Charles Bianconi lived in Longfield House which is in the civil parish.
- Walter Butler of Nodstown also lived in the civil parish

== See also ==
- List of civil parishes of Tipperary
