= Buolick (townland) =

Townland in County Tipperary, Ireland

Coordinates: 52.6578°N 7.6161°W

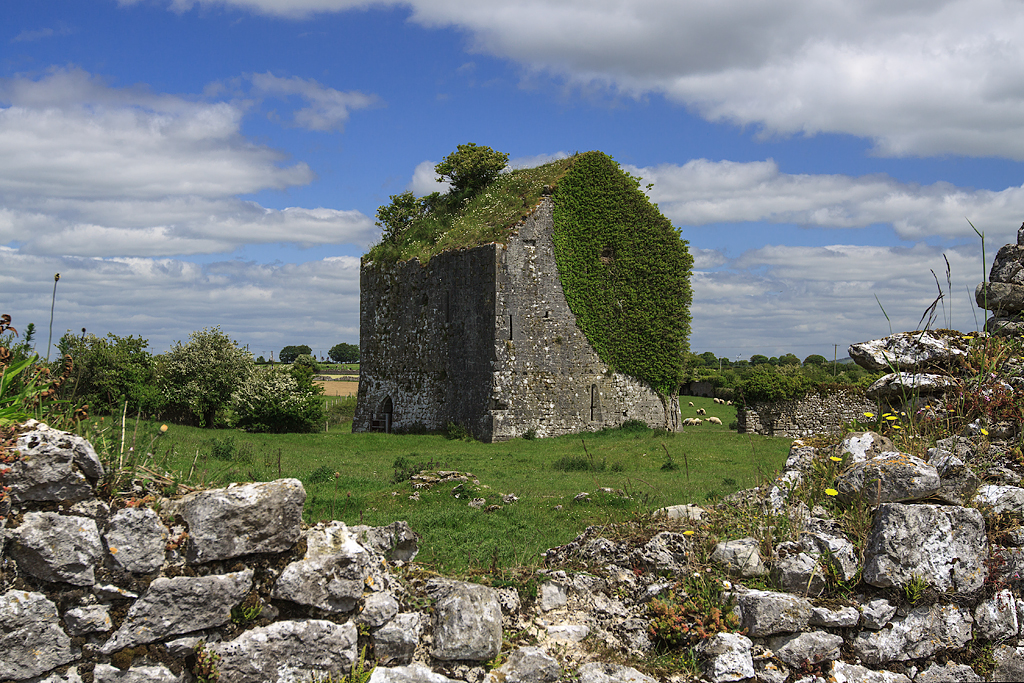
Buolick tower house is in Buolick townland

Buolick (Irish: Buailic) is a townland in the civil parish of the same name in County Tipperary, Ireland. It is approximately 2 square kilometres (0.8 sq mi) in area, and had a population of 27 people (in 11 houses) as of the 2011 census of Ireland.

There is a 15th century tower house in the townland, close to the ruin and graveyard of a medieval church.

The village of Gortnahoe is nearby.
