= Ballytarsna, Clonmel, County Tipperary =

Townland in County Tipperary, Ireland

Coordinates: 52.585°N 7.831°W

Ballytarsna is a townland in County Tipperary in Ireland. Occupying 104 acres, it is located in the civil parish of Newchapel in the barony of Iffa and Offa East in the poor law union of Clonmel.
