= Kilmorgan Church and Burial Ground =

Historic site in County Sligo, Ireland

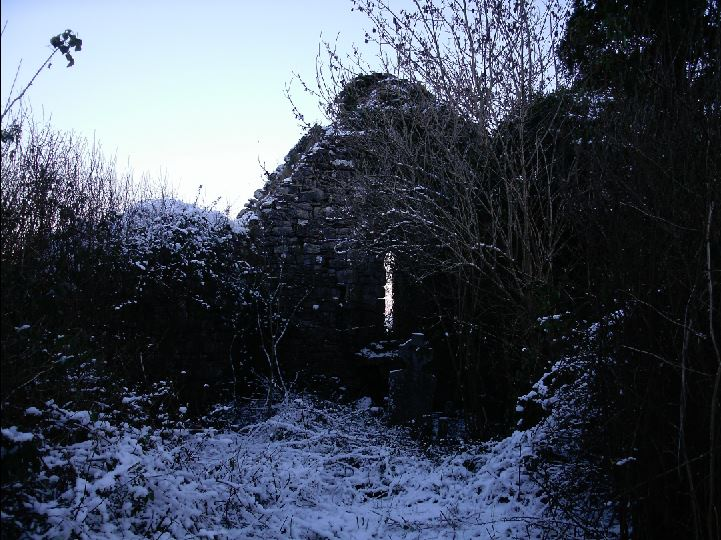
Interior side of Kilmorgan's eastern gable showing lancet window

Kilmorgan Church and Burial Ground consists of the remains of a small church, likely from the 17th century, and a now disused burial ground containing a variety of graves including family vaults. It lies in the townland of Kilmorgan (Irish: Cill Mhurchon), also giving its name to the civil parish and half parish where it resides. This church half-parish is located along the north-east of the south- Sligo barony of Corran and is part of the Catholic parish of Emlaghfad and Kilmorgan more commonly known as Ballymote parish. The Church of Ireland version is The Union of Emlaghfad and Kilmorgan.

== History ==
=== Founder ===
The common belief is that Kilmorgan was founded by or dedicated to a St. Murchu/Murchon recorded in the 17th-century Martyrology of Donegal as being a descendant of Conall Cremthainne, son of Niall of the Nine Hostages, and having a feast day on June 12. The author of this work, Michael O'Cleirigh, also worked on the great Irish genealogies. Additional work done by him on the genealogies of the Irish saints connected this saint to the Síl nÁedo Sláine line of Conalls descendants. Murchu looks to be on a non-regal line four generations below king Áed Sláine, making him active around late seventh to early eighth centuries. The saint is listed in the medieval Martyrology of Tallaght but is absent from another medieval work the Martyrology of Oengus. However, indexes added during later years on this Martyrology claim that Kilmorgan is dedicated to another St Murchan or Murchu, Mac Ua Maichtene. This saint whose day is the June 8 is believed to be the Murchu responsible for a biography of Saint Patrick.

=== Beginnings ===
While it is unclear when founded and who exactly its dedicated to its very likely that it was a Monastery at some early stage. It gets frequently referred to as a monastery with one archaeologist claiming to have identified an encircling enclosure, a feature of medieval Irish monasteries. The same expert also pointed out numerous features that give evidence of early monastic settlements such as burial grounds and holy-wells. A ritual well is located just 200m north of the church and this feature could even indicate pre-Christian activity in the area. A leading medieval expert Edel Breathneach declares that early missionaries chose sites close to existing cult centres. The ritual well could be a reason for the location based on this view, however an archaeological reference by Samuel Lewis in his 19th-century Topographical dictionary of Ireland could also provide a reason. In it the writer refers to Mounds of earth nearby Kilmorgan which covered graves containing urns and bones which they believe signifies an ancient battle site. A recent assessment of this reference in a 2005 Archaeological Inventory of Sligo believes Lewis to be referring to monuments in the Doo region that is just between 1 and 2 km from Kilmorgan. These include a large Neolithic mound and a stone cairn. Close to these is the tall, almost triangular, standing stone at Knockminna. This area could qualify as pre-Christian ceremonial centre attracting rival missionary teaching to take place nearby, eventually leading to a monastic settlement and church.

=== Decline and new church ===
Its estimated that Kilmorgan parish was united with the neighbouring parish of Emlaghfad around 1704 at a time when the Penal laws were being enforced, with these restrictions likely leading to the closure of Kilmorgan church also. The final priest active in Kilmorgan at this time was Edmund Cunane subjected to monitoring similar to other Catholic priests due to Penal law restrictions. The local Catholic population were forced to practice their faith in outdoor locations, easy to disperse from if there was a threat of being caught. A famous spot where it was practiced locally was known as the Mass Rock of Doo. After the penal laws lapsed around the end of the 18th century it was decided to build a new church close to the Mass rock. Eventually nearly a century later this thatched chapel was replaced by the current St. Josephs Church of Doo. This regional name of Doo is also used in place of Kilmorgan to refer to the half-parish. The burial ground which began or continued to be used in penal times remained in use until it was advised there was overcrowding and a New Kilmorgan Burial Ground was set up in 1940 using a location closer to St. Josephs Church.

Burials though did continue in the old ground up until the early 1980's. Since then there has not likely been a lot of activity on the site. One significant moment in more recent times occurred in June 2000 when Mass was held on the site, believed to be the first since pre-reformation times. This was held as part of a celebration of Kilmorgan including an event held in Ballymote where Sligo archaeologists Mary and Martin Timoney gave lectures on the sites history. Organised by the local Doo Development Group, a document for this event titled 'Kilmorgan Since Early Christian Times', though not preserved in the library system, was used as source material on Kilmorgan sites for the 2005 Archaeological Inventory of Sligo.

== Features ==
=== Church ===
A small church measuring about 20 by 7 metres, all that remains is the pitched eastern gable and parts of the north and south walls which join this side. This gable contains a tall narrow window light, rounded on top while the south wall has a two-light window opening near its corner with the east wall. This latter window generated some interest with the Royal Historical & Archaeological Association in that its whole frame was made from one piece of stone. A journal published by them in 1889 implies that it was the only example of a single stone two-light window known to them.

=== Burial ground ===
Overall site measures about 38 by 22 metres (including the church). Prone to overgrowing weeds and branches, it lies close to a tree-covered crossroads. The oldest burial identified here is from 1716 which could well have been after the church was closed down. The burial ground is mentioned as being used by Protestants as well as Catholics and its likely Church of Ireland chiefly used it during Penal times. The array of monuments here include headstones, some of which are set in the old church interior, chest-tombs and vaults. The most prominent of these vaults is a Catholic grave being the family Mausoleum erected by a local merchant Morgan McDonagh in 1822. It's chiefly made of limestone with a pitched roof, also made of stones, and features an opening in one wall filled with a large stone plaque containing carved dedication text.

== Folklore ==
A folk-tale about Kilmorgan church is recorded in a 19th-century history of Ballysadare and Kilvarnet. It tells that the church in Kilmorgan was originally built in Cloonamahon but it moved to Lough Cronan (now Corran) in Drumfin and then again to its current resting site. The author of the history believes that this legend helps confirm that there was a church in Cloonamahon and it predated the church in Kilmorgan, possibly implying that it was the order/saint themselves that moved from one location to another. Another variant of this legend exists but it concerns the graveyard rather than the church building itself. Here the legend says the Graveyard began in Cloonamahon before eventually reappearing in Kilmorgan, in this version the intermediary stops are Killough and Newpark townland instead of Lough Cronan. As the burial ground outlasted the church this is likely a later version of the legend. Despite claims to the existence of a medieval church at Cloonamahon(believed to have been on the grounds of Cloonamahon house which was itself replaced by a Passionist church and monastery), no site has been located though what's believed to be an old church stoup has been found in the area (now residing in the Collooney Parochial House). Interestingly Newpark, which appears in the graveyard version of the legend, contains what is classified as a medieval ecclesiastical enclosure. The field where this lies is referred to as Killack, or the "church of the flagstones", traditionally believed to contain a church and burial ground.
