= Buolick =

Buolick Buailic
- Civil parish
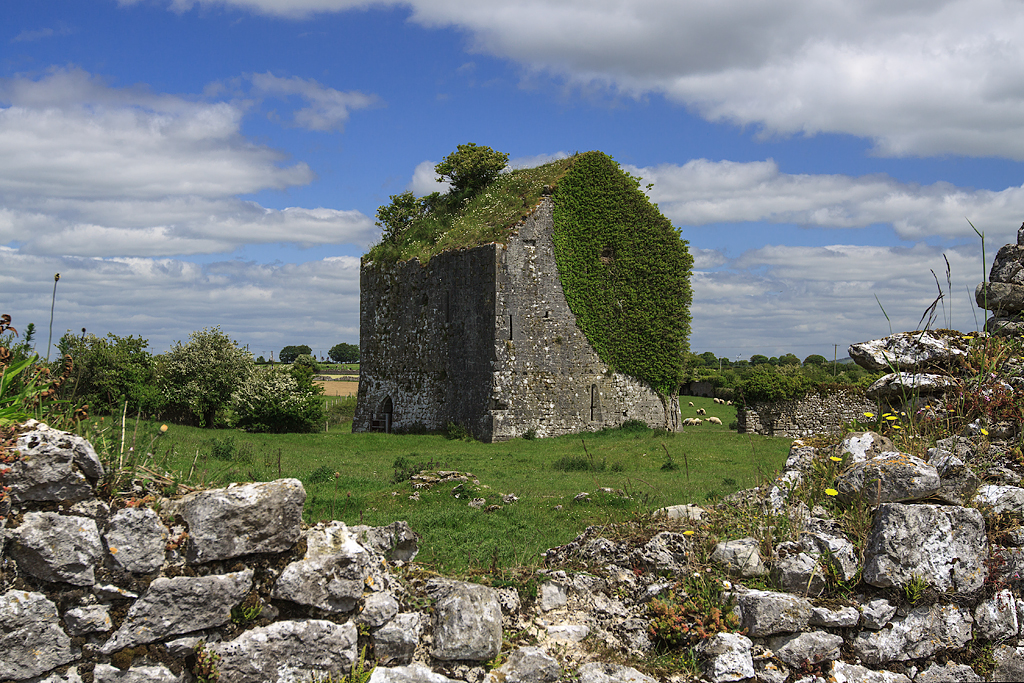
- Buolick tower house lies within the civil parish, close to a ruined medieval church and graveyard

- Location within Ireland
- Coordinates: 52.66°N 7.62°W
- Country: Ireland
- County: County Tipperary

Buolick (Irish: Buailic) is a civil parish in County Tipperary, Ireland. It is one of nineteen civil parishes in the barony of Slievardagh. Buolick, also sometimes written as Boolick or Baolick, is also an electoral division in County Tipperary. The electoral division, originally in the Thurles Poor Law Union, is largely coterminous with Buolick civil parish. The village of Gortnahoo (or Gortnahoe) lies within the civil parish.

== Townlands ==
There are twenty townlands in the parish, including:

- Ballynastick
- Bawnreagh
- Buolick
- Clonamicklon
- Clonamondra
- Coole
- Crab
- Derrycoogh
- Foilacamin
- Gortnahoo
- Gorteen Lower
- Gorteen Upper
- Gorteenrainee
- Graigaman
- Kilbraugh
- Knockanglass
- Knockboy
- Littlefield
- Mellisson
- Poyntstown
