= Ladytown =

Village and townland in County Kildare, Ireland

Ladytown Irish: Baile na Mná Maithe
- Village
- Location in Ireland
- Coordinates: 53°12′00″N 06°44′07″W
- Country: Ireland
- Province: Leinster
- County: County Kildare

Population (2016)
  - Total: 460
- Time zone: UTC+0 (WET)
  - Summer (DST): UTC-1 (IST (WEST))

Ladytown (Irish: Baile na Mná Maithe) is a village, townland and civil parish in County Kildare, Ireland.
