= Horetown =

Civil parish in County Wexford, Ireland

Coordinates: 52°19′11″N 6°43′06″W

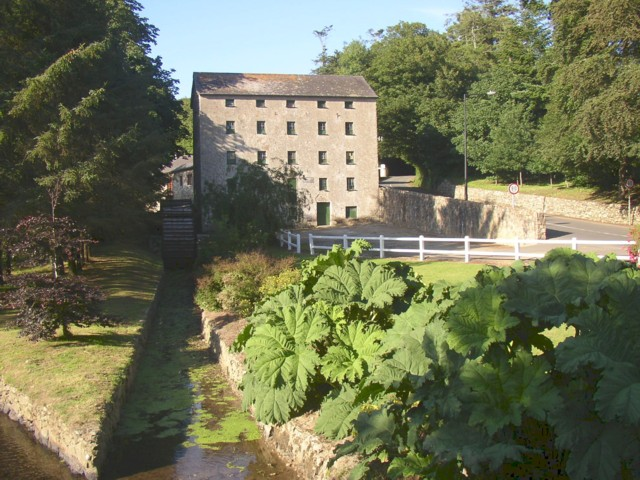
Foulkesmill Corn Mill, in Raheenduff townland of Horetown civil parish, is listed on Wexford County Council's Record of Protected Structures

Horetown (Irish: Baile an Hóraigh) is a civil parish in County Wexford, Ireland. Located approximately 17 km west of Wexford town, the townlands of Raheenduff (An Ráithín Dubh), Horetown North (Baile an Hóraigh Thuaidh) and Horetown South (Baile an Hóraigh Theas) are among the 10 townlands within the civil parish. Protected structures in Horetown South townland include Horetown House (built c. 1840) and Saint James's Church Horetown (c. 1856).
