= Tomhaggard =

Civil parish and townland in County Wexford, Ireland

Tomhaggard Teach Moshagard
- Civil parish
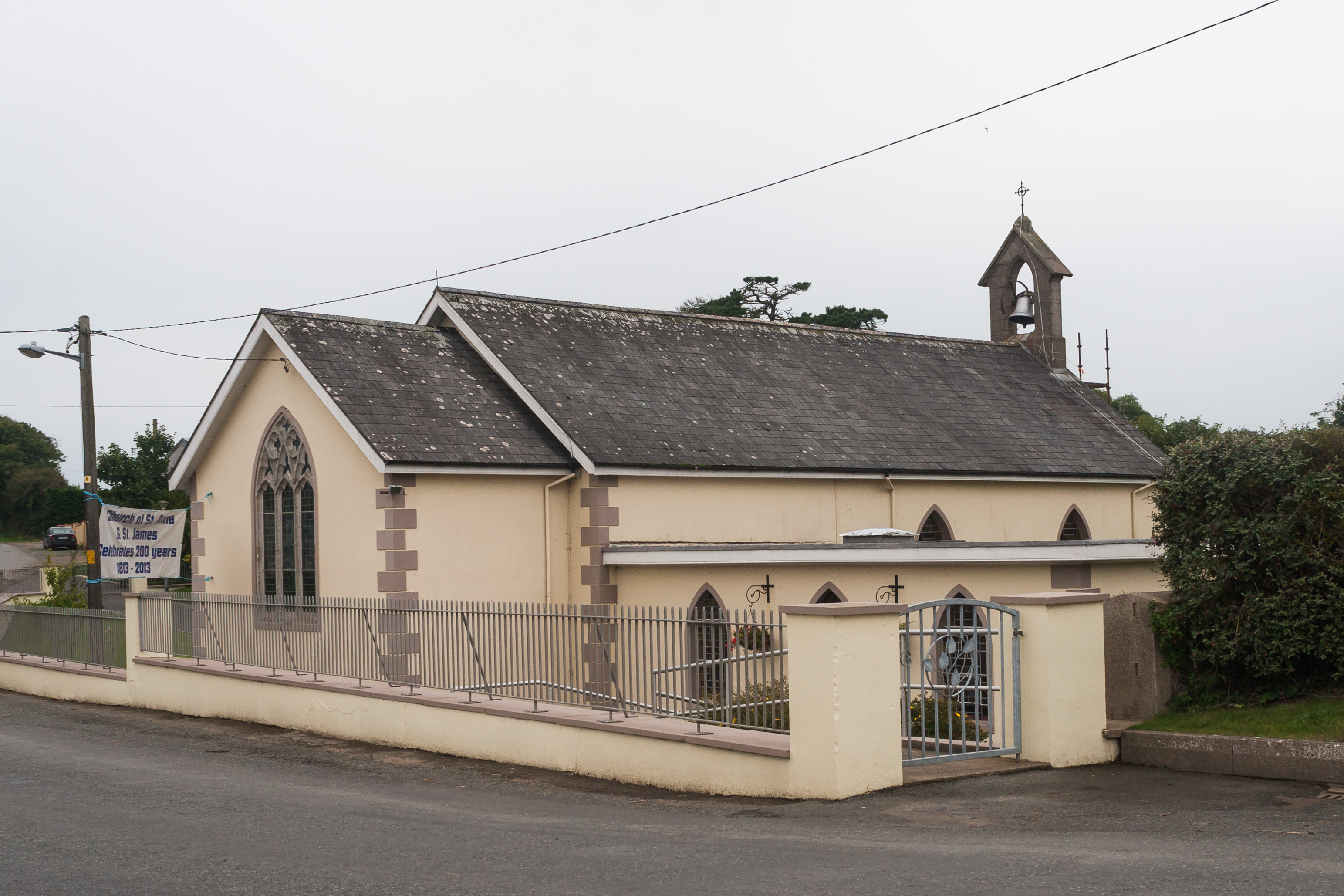
- Church of St. Anne and St. James
- Interactive map of Tomhaggard
- Location in Ireland
- Coordinates: 52.2107°N 6.50516°W
- Country: Ireland
- Province: Leinster
- County: County Wexford
- Time zone: UTC+0 (WET)
  - Summer (DST): UTC-1 (IST (WEST))

Tomhaggard (Irish: Teach Moshagard) is a civil parish and townland in County Wexford in the south of Ireland. Tomhaggard townland, which has an area of approximately 10.8 square kilometres (4.2 sq mi), had a population of 73 people as of the 2011 census.

== History ==
=== Built heritage ===
The Record of Monuments and Places lists church, ringfort, holy well and church sites within Tomhaggard townland. A former parish church at Tomhaggard lies within a enclosed graveyard, with archeological testing shows ditches just north of the ditch outside of the graveyard's walls, with the ditches potentially being a multi-vallate ecclesiastical enclosure. The graveyard houses unidentified drowning victims. The townland also contains a mass house built in 1731 that closed in 1813, with the house being restored in 2003. The 1862 edition of The Journal of the Kilkenny and South-East of Ireland Archaeological Society mentions a 'manor of Tomhaggard'. The Catholic Telegraph, Volume 57, Number 34, from 23 August 1888 states that a 'St. James' is the patron saint of Tomhaggard.

The village's original Celtic church was originally owned by Saint Mosacer, who died in 650. On Christmas morning 1653, the church was burned down, and local priest Fr. Nicholas Meyler was murdered by Oliver Cromwell's 'red coats' for violating the Penal Laws while celebrating mass in the southern part of Tomhaggard townland, with mass being celebrated there annually to commemorate the event. A small mass rock was rediscovered there c. 1982. The rock reads; The mass rock where Fr. Nicholas Mayler P.P. Tacumshane and Tomhaggard was killed on Christmas morning 1653 while celebrating mass.

Several editions of The Gentleman's and Citizen's Almanack For the Year of our Lord, (the year of that edition) from the late 1700s and early 1800s record a July fair in Tomhaggard. (Note: ſ is an archaic version of lowercase s) The parish of Tomhaggard was recorded as having 67 houses in 1807, with Tomhaggard and Kilturk covering 2200 acres combined.
