= Courtbrack =

Village in County Cork, Ireland

Courtbrack An Chúirt Bhreac
- Townland
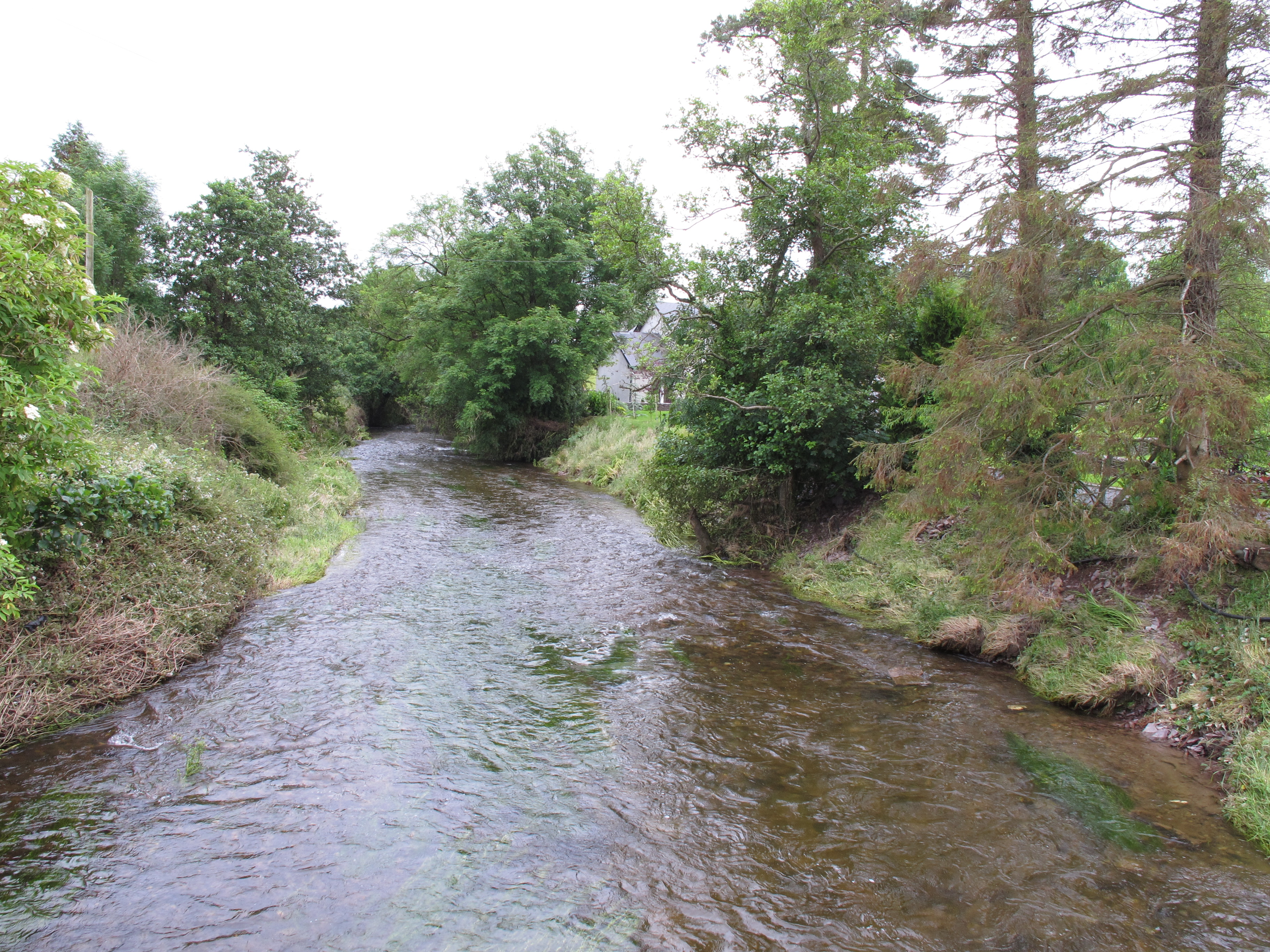
- Shournagh River at Foxs Bridge near Courtbrack

- Location in Ireland
- Coordinates: 51.968°N 8.645°W
- Country: Ireland
- Province: Munster
- County: Cork

Population (2016)
  - Total: 194
- Irish Grid Reference: W557796

Courtbrack (Irish: An Chúirt Bhreac) is a townland and village in County Cork, Ireland. It is located in the civil parish of Matehy close to the town of Blarney. The local Roman Catholic church is dedicated to Saint Joseph and was built c. 1840.

Formerly a largely rural area, as of the early 21st century the townland was zoned for residential development. Courtbrack was designated as a census town by the Central Statistics Office for the first time in the 2016 census, at which time it had a population of 194 people.
