= Charles Hubert Roberts =

British surgeon (1865–1929)

Charles Hubert Roberts FRCS FRCP
- Born: 1865
- Died: 29 January 1929 (aged 63–64); Esbjerg, Denmark

Charles Hubert Roberts FRCS FRCP (1865–1929) was a British surgeon, physician and lecturer in the fields of gynaecology and obstetrics. He was highly regarded for his diagnostic and surgical skills and was considered to have been an inspiring teacher. He served as Senior Physician to the Samaritan Free Hospital for Women and Physician to In-Patients at Queen Charlotte's and Chelsea Hospital.

== Education ==
Roberts had a brilliant academic career. He entered St Bartholomew's Hospital from Bedford Modern School in 1884 and won the junior and senior scholarships in Clinical Medicine in 1885 and 1886 and the Brackenbury Scholarship in Surgery. At London University he studied Materia Medica and Chemistry for the Degree of MB in 1893 and gained his MD and the gold medal in 1896.

== Career ==
At St. Bart's he held a succession of appointments culminating in the position of Demonstrator of Practical Midwifery and the Diseases of Women. However, the main part of his career was spent at Queen Charlotte's and Chelsea Hospital and the Samaritan Free Hospital for Women and he remained at these establishments until his retirement in 1925. During the War he served as Hon. Obstetric Surgeon at Lady Howard de Walden's Maternity Hospital for Officers' Wives and assisted at Epsom War Hospital. He also established a private practice in Harley Street.

He served as Examiner in Midwifery and Gynaecology, Conjoint Board, London, Examiner to the Central Midwives Board and Examiner in Obstetrics and Gynaecology at the University of Sheffield.

He was appointed a Fellow of the Royal College of Surgeons in 1892 and a Fellow of the Royal College of Physicians in 1912. He was also a Fellow of the Royal Society of Medicine and in 1913 chaired the Society's section on Obstetrics and Gynaecology.

His main publications were Outlines of Gynaecological Pathology and Morbid Anatomy (1901) and a translation (with M. L. Trechmann) of Ernst Gottlob Orthmann's Handbook of Gynaecological Anatomy (1904)

Charles Roberts died of influenza at Esbjerg, in Denmark on 29 January 1929.
