= Aglish, County Tipperary =

Village in County Tipperary, Ireland

Aglish An Eaglais
- Village
- Location in Ireland
- Coordinates: 53°02′28″N 8°05′13″W
- Country: Ireland
- Province: Munster
- County: County Tipperary

Population (2006)
  - Total: 289
- Time zone: UTC+0 (WET)
  - Summer (DST): UTC-1 (IST (WEST))

Aglish (Irish: An Eaglais) is a small settlement in County Tipperary in Ireland. It is in the Civil parish and electoral division of Aglishcloghane in the historical barony of Ormond Lower. The village is approximately 7 kilometres (4 mi) north of Borrisokane and 1 km (0.6 mi) east of the R438 road.

The local Roman Catholic Church, St. Michael's (built 1893), is a limestone structure in a village composed of modest domestic buildings.

The previously disused old school, just to the east has been restored by an Operation Transformation group into a space for the local community.

The building of Aglish Church of Ireland was financed by the Board of First Fruits, it is listed (RPS Ref S9) as a protected structure.
