= Kilmastulla =

Townland in County Tipperary, Ireland

Coordinates: 52.785°N 8.392°W

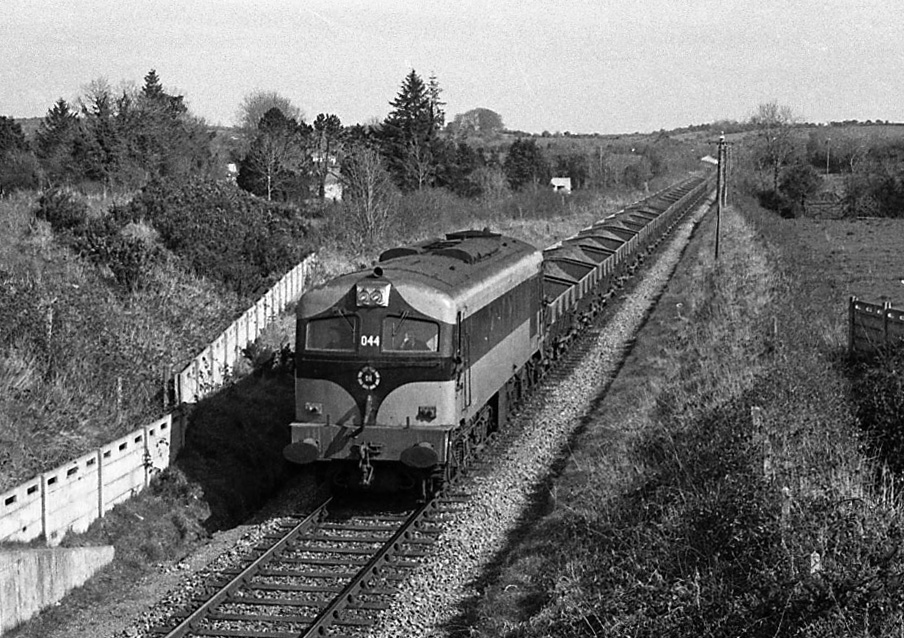
A freight train near Kilmastulla in 1975

Kilmastulla (Irish: Cill Mhac Stola) is a civil parish and townland in the Barony of Owney and Arra, County Tipperary, Ireland. The area lies within the electoral division of Birdhill. As of the 2011 census, Kilmastulla townland had a population of 34 people.

== See also ==
- List of civil parishes of County Tipperary
