= Kilcommock =

Civil parish in County Longford, Ireland

Coordinates: 53°36′06″N 7°48′48″W

Kilcommock is a civil parish and townland in County Longford, Ireland.
