= Castleinch =

Civil parish in Ireland

Coordinates: 52°22′18″N 7°10′40″W

Castleinch or Inchyolaghan (Irish: Inse Uí Uallacháin) is a civil parish and townland in County Kilkenny, Ireland. Castleinch is a small townland of approximately 1.81 square kilometres (0.70 sq mi), and had a population of 49 people as of the 2011 census.
