= Killincoole =

Civil parish in County Louth, Ireland

Killincoole (Irish: Cillín Cúile, meaning 'little church of the corner') is a civil parish in County Louth, Ireland. It consists of three townlands:

- Allardstown, to the north
- Killincoole, to the south
- Rathneety, to the west

It is about 4 miles south of Lurgan-Green on the road from Ardee to Dundalk. In 1839 it had a population of 770.

== Killincoole Castle ==
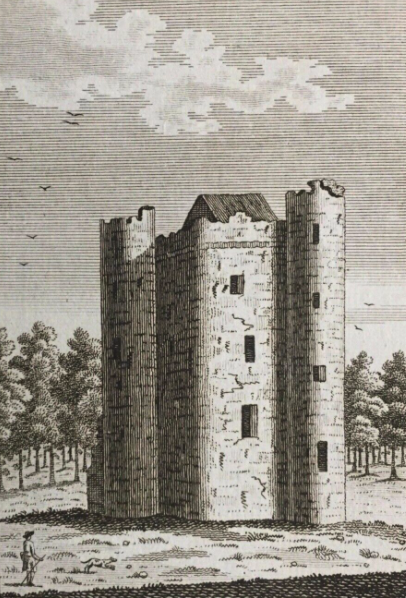
Killincoole Castle, 1784

The castle stands on private land, part of a farm. It is a four-storey tower which has a vaulted basement and two D-shaped turrets. A staircase is located in the turret beside the east facing entrance.
