= Dunamon =

Civil parish in County Galway, Ireland

Coordinates: 53°22′46″N 8°11′27″W

Dunamon is a civil parish in County Galway, Ireland. The main land-owning family in the locality were the Caulfeilds.

== See also ==
- Donamon Castle, a fortified house in County Roscommon
