= Aghinagh =

Civil parish in County Cork, Ireland

Coordinates: 51.894°N 8.895°W

Aghinagh (Irish: Achadh Fhíonach) is a civil parish in the historical barony of Muskerry East in County Cork, Ireland. Located to the east of the town of Macroom, the civil parish is approximately 38 square kilometres (15 sq mi) in area, and contains the villages of Ballinagree, Bealnamorive, Carrigadrohid and Rusheen.

== Name ==
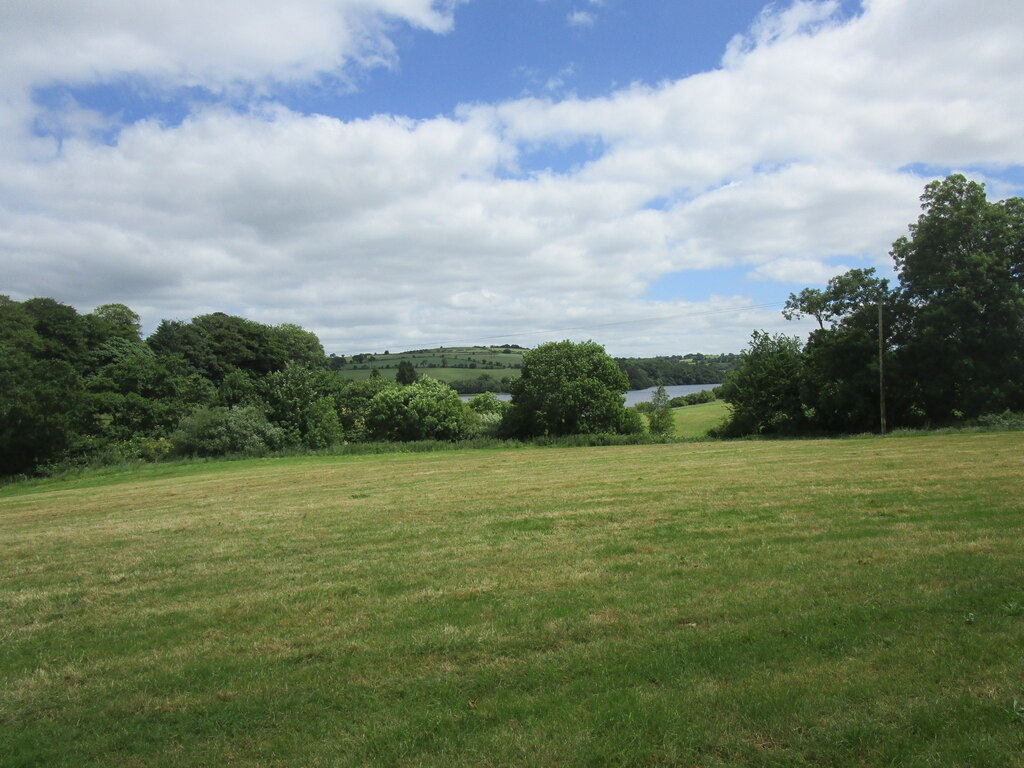
Farmland and the River Lee in Aghinagh

While the Placenames Database of Ireland does not record a specific derivation for the modern Irish name of the parish, Achadh Fhíonach, a late 19th-century entry in the Journal of the Cork Historical and Archaeological Society suggests that the name derives from Achadh Eidhneach meaning "ivy-covered field".

Aghinagh is also the name of an electoral division, former Church of Ireland parish and Catholic parish in the area.

== Built heritage ==
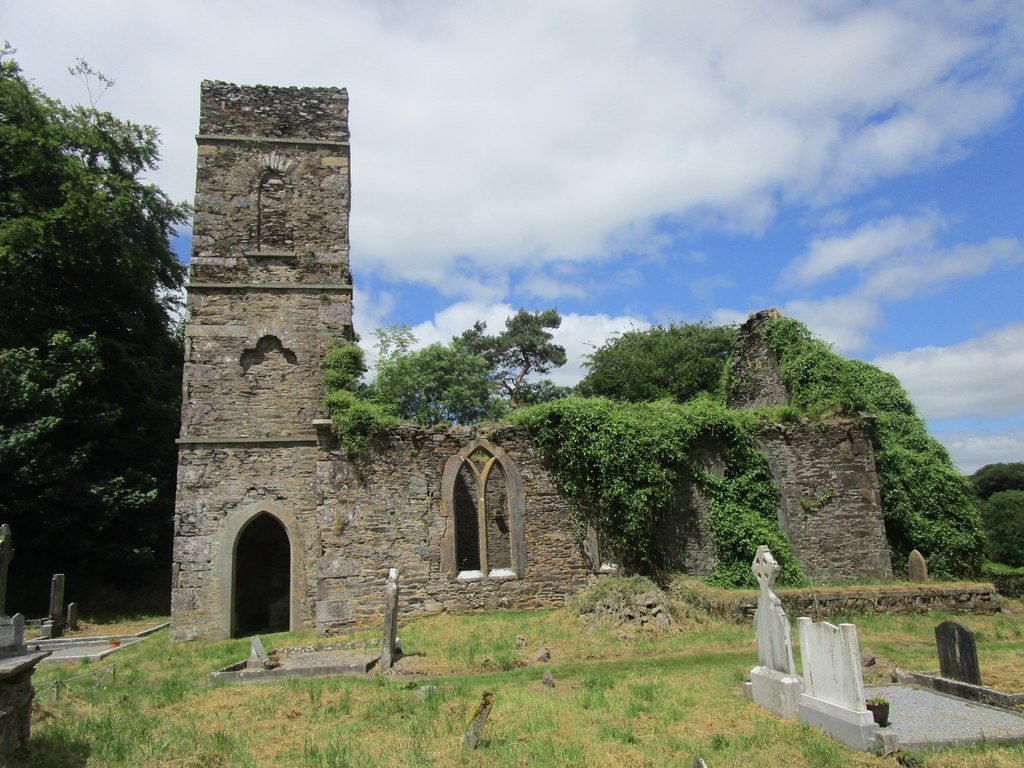
The former Church of Ireland church lies in Aghinagh Churchyard (also sometimes known as Killinardish Churchyard)

The Church of Ireland church in Aghinagh, now in ruins, was built in the early 1790s. Constructed on the site of an earlier church, the surrounding churchyard contains a number of gravestones which have been dated to at least the mid-18th century. A spring near the churchyard, marked on some maps as Toberatemple (from Tober an Teampaill meaning "well of the church"), is "considered a holy well".

Aghinagh House, also known as Ashton House, is a former rectory in Caum townland within Aghinagh. The Georgian building was constructed c. 1810. 19th century maps of the area label the house as "Ashton" or "Aghinagh Rectory". It was formerly the home of Lieutenant-General Sir Adrian Carton de Wiart, who lived there until his death in 1963. The house was later the residence of the horse-trainer Fergie Sutherland (1931–2012), until it was sold in 2023.

== Notable people ==
- Adrian Carton de Wiart (1880–1963), highly-decorated military officer who lived at Aghinagh House and is buried in of Aghinagh churchyard.
- Boetius MacEgan (c. 1600–1650), Bishop of Ross and member of Irish Confederacy who was killed at Carrigadrohid by Cromwellian forces and reputedly buried in Aghinagh.
- Fergie Sutherland (1931–2012), horse-trainer who also lived at Aghinagh House.

== See also ==
- Aghinagh GAA
