= Aglish, County Cork =

Civil parish in County Cork, Ireland

Coordinates: 51.8838°N 8.7636°W

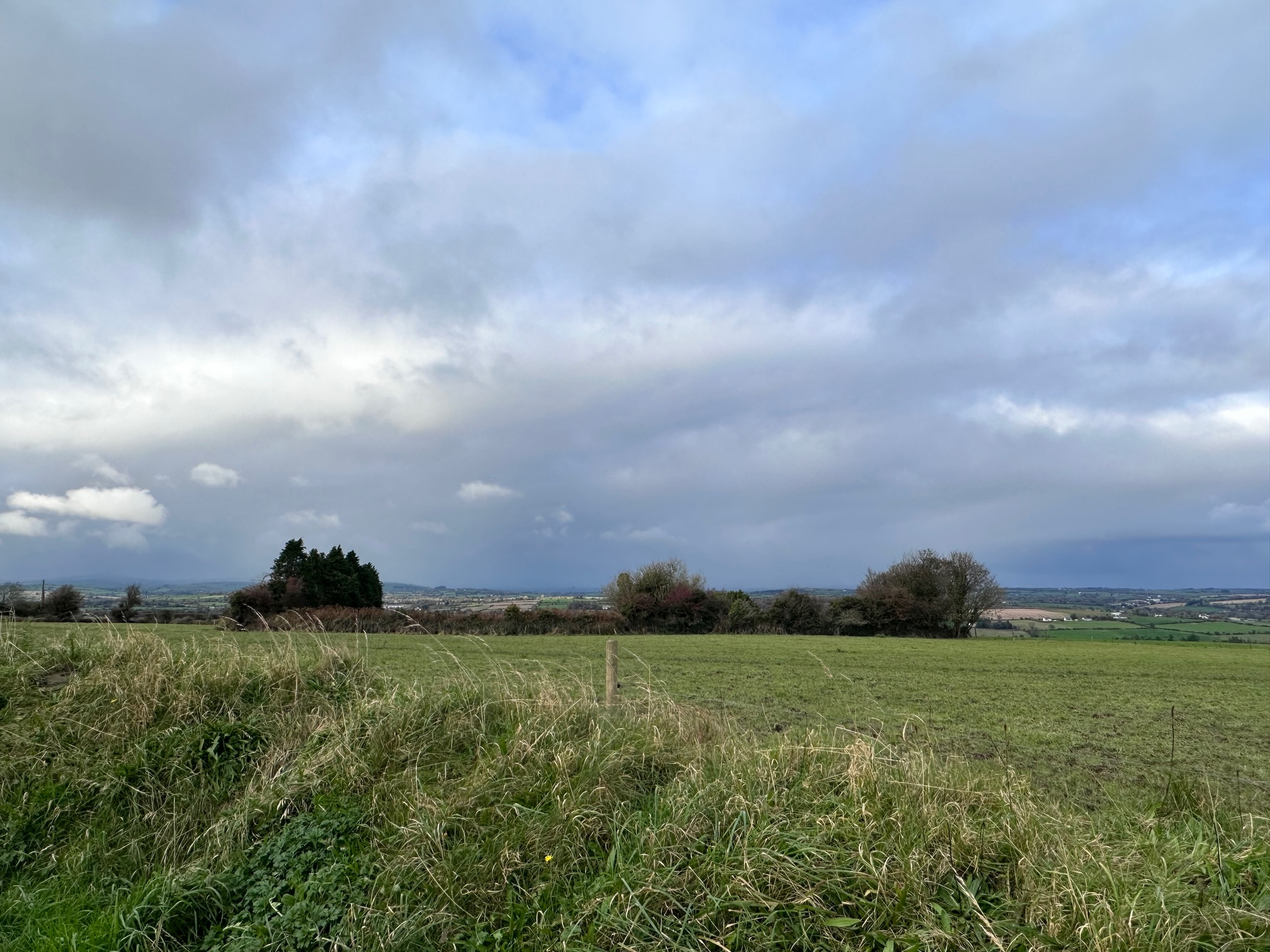
Aglish Church and Cemetery from the south.

Aglish (Irish: An Eaglais, meaning 'the church') is a civil parish in the barony of Muskerry East, twelve miles west of the city of Cork, County Cork, Ireland. It is situated in an area of high ground sloping down to the southern edge of the River Lee, with views overlooking the Lee Valley and the Boggeragh Mountains to the north.

Archeologists suggest that it is a pre-christian site, and the original church may have been founded by Saint Finnbarr (or Barra) in about the 6th century, while on his journey from Gougane Barra to Cork City. The medieval parish church at Aglish is recorded in taxation records of 1199 as 'Magalaid' and was recorded in 1482 as 'Agalasmaschala'.

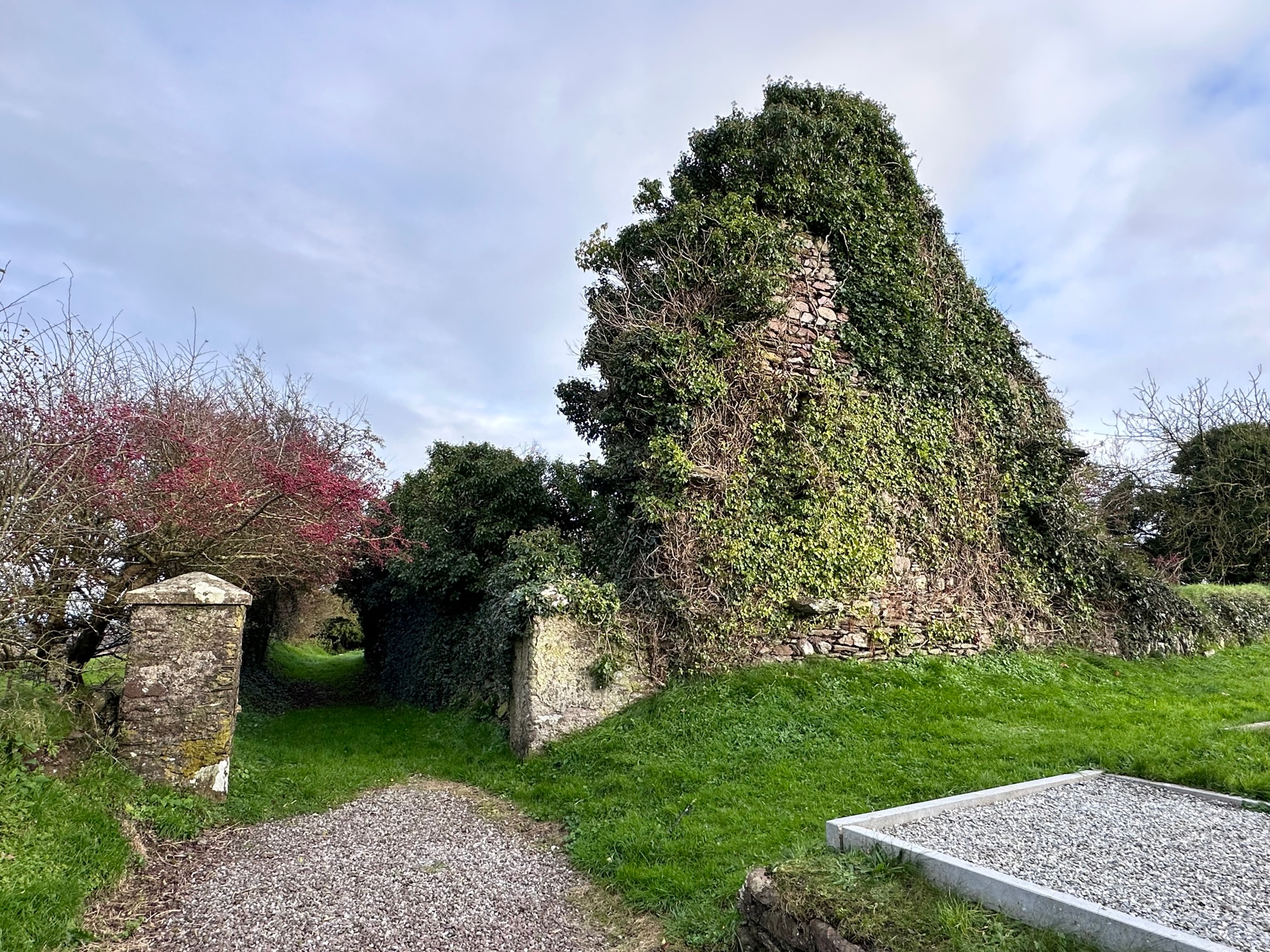
Aglish -West Gable of Church

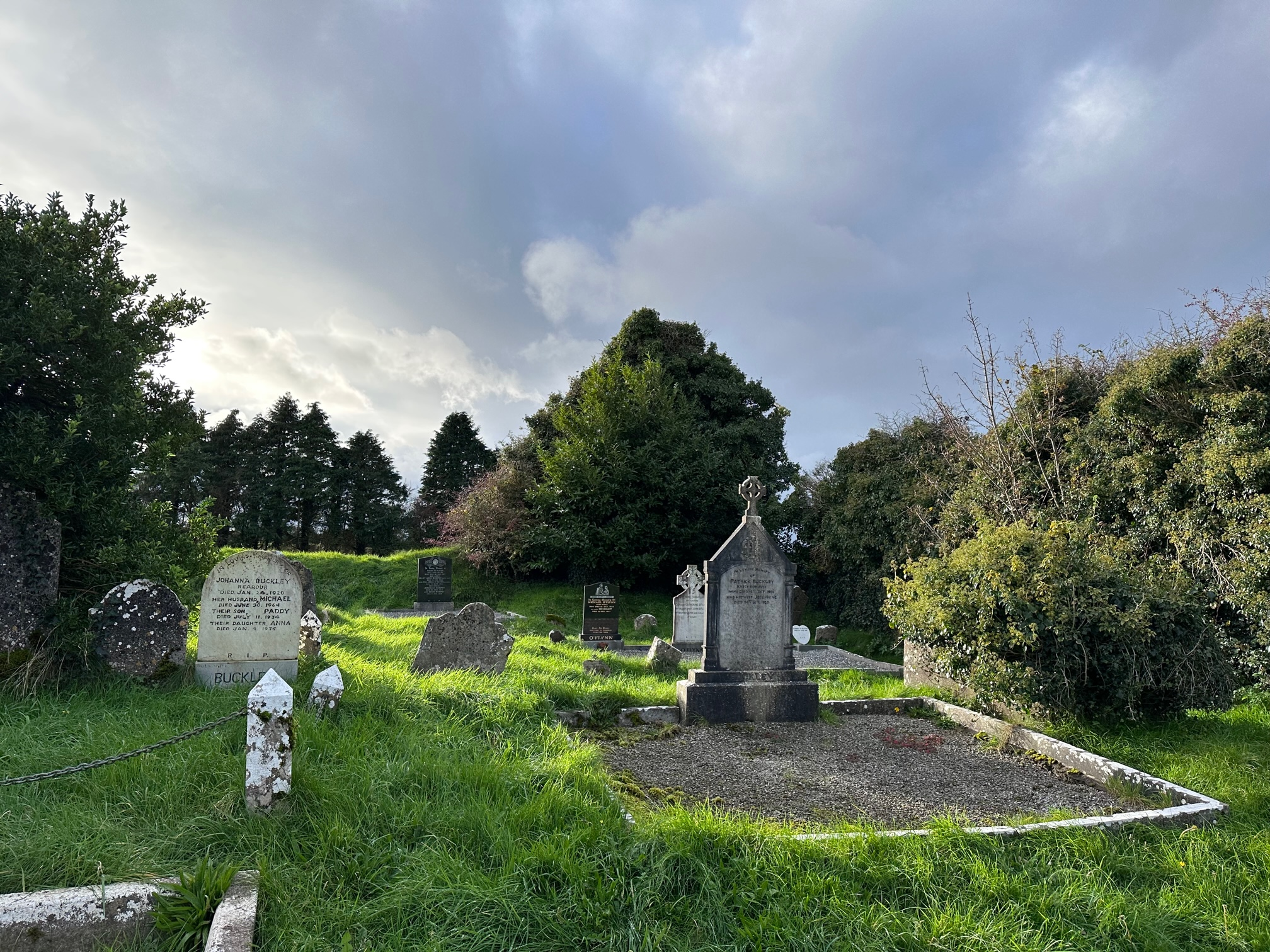
Aglish Cemetery - Older graveyard east of church

The ruins of this church, which was built of local stone and lime, are still extant, although now only the northern and western walls are prominent, with the overgrown western gable forming an imposing silhouette in the landscape. The old graveyard lies to the east of the church. A new graveyard was opened to the west of the church in the 1970s and is still being used for families in the area.

An Ogham inscription was discovered near Aglish which displays the words MUCOI SOGINI, probably referring to the historic tribe of the Corcu Sogain.
