= Coolbanagher =

Civil parish and townland in County Laois, Ireland

Coordinates: 53°17′44″N 7°07′53″W

Coolbanagher is a civil parish and townland in County Laois, Ireland. The Church of Ireland church is St John, which was the work of the English architect James Gandon, who also designed Dublin's Custom House.
