= Templemichael, County Cork =

Civil parish in County Cork, Ireland

Coordinates: 51.7761°N 8.5959°W

Templemichael (Irish: Teampall Mhichíl) is a civil parish in County Cork, Ireland. Listed in some records as "Templemichael De Duagh" or "St. Michael de Dowagh", it is located within the historical barony of Kinalea, near Innishannon.

== See also ==
- List of townlands of the barony of Kinalea
