= Matehy =

Civil parish in County Cork, Ireland

Coordinates: 51.9526°N 8.6561°W

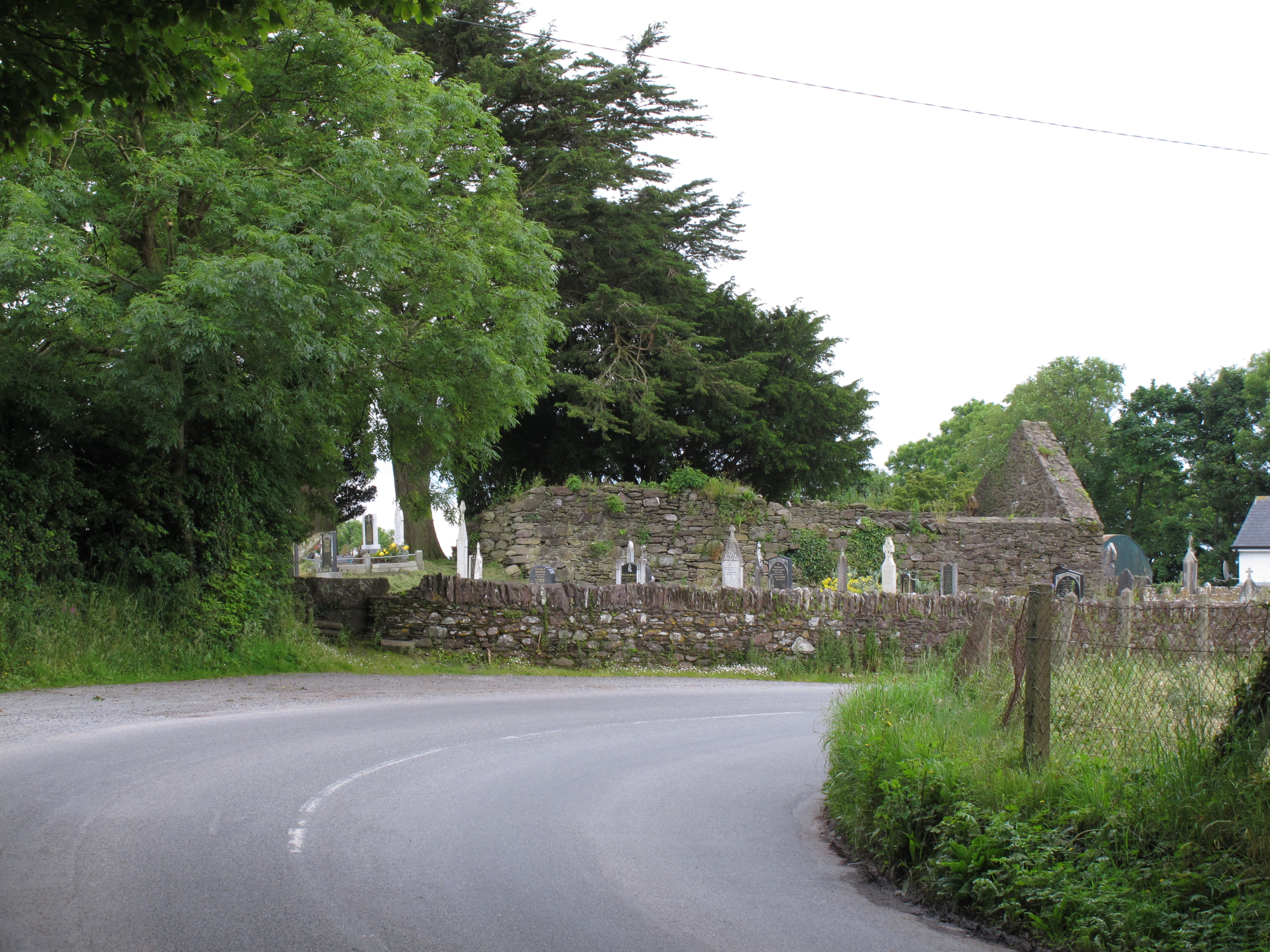
Cemetery and church ruin in Matehy

Matehy (Irish: Maigh Teichigh) is a civil parish in the historical barony of Muskerry East in County Cork, Ireland. The civil parish is centred on a small settlement, also referred to as Matehy, which contains a Roman Catholic church (built c. 1820), a national (primary) school, and pub. Evidence of ancient settlement in the area include ringfort sites in Gilcagh townland, and a circular ecclesiastical enclosure containing the remains of a church (dating to at least the early 17th century) and a number of 18th century gravestones.

== See also ==
- Courtbrack
