= Newchapel, County Tipperary =

Civil parish in County Tipperary, Ireland

Newchapel (Irish: An Eaglais Nua) is a civil parish in the barony of Iffa and Offa East in County Tipperary, Ireland.
