= Toby =

- Pronunciation: TOH-Bee
- Gender: Unisex

Origin
- Origin: English
- Meaning: God is Good

Other names
- Related names: Tobias

Toby is a given name in many English-speaking countries. The name is derived the Middle English vernacular form of Tobias. Tobias itself is the Greek transliteration of the Hebrew טוביה Toviah, which translates to Good is Yahweh. Yahweh is the name of the Jewish God.

It is also used as a contraction of Tobin, an Irish surname now also used as a forename.

The name is traditionally masculine, but has also been in use for women since the 19th century.

== Men ==
- Toby Aaron Hamilton (born 2001), known professionally as 6arelyhuman, American rapper and singer-songwriter
- Toby Adamson (born 1990), English rugby league footballer
- Toby Ajala (born 1991), English footballer
- Toby Albert (born 2001), English cricketer
- Toby Alderweireld (born 1989), Belgian professional association footballer
- Toby Amies (born 1967), English filmmaker and broadcaster
- Toby Anstis (born 1968), British radio and television broadcaster
- Toby Aromolaran (born 1999), English association footballer and television personality
- Toby Bailey (born 1975), American sports agent and professional basketballer
- Toby Bailey (cricketer) (born 1976), English cricketer
- Toby Balding (1936–2014), British racehorse trainer
- Toby Barker (born 1981), American politician
- Toby Barrett (born 1945), Canadian politician
- Edmund "Toby" Barton (1849–1920), Australian politician, barrister and jurist who served as the first prime minister of Australia from 1901 to 1903
- Toby Berger (1940–2022), American information theorist
- Toby Bluth (1940–2013), American illustrator, animator, background artist, and production designer
- Toby Britton (born 2006), Jersey cricketer
- Toby Buckland (born 1969), English gardener, television presenter and author
- Toby Burke (fl. 2000–), Australian musician, guitarist, and singer songwriter
- Toby Cadman (born 2001), British international lawyer
- Toby Chance (born 1960), South African politician
- Toby Charles (born 1940), Welsh association football commentator
- Toby Chauncy (1674–1733), British lawyer and politician
- Toby Chu (born 1977), American composer and artist
- Toby Clarke (1939–2019), British baronet and businessman
- Toby Colbeck (1884–1918), English cricketer
- Toby Collyer (born 2004), English association footballer
- Toby Conway (born 2003), Australian rules footballer for Geelong
- Toby Cosgrove (born 1940), American surgeon and war veteran
- Toby Couchman (born 2003), Australian rugby league footballer for St. George Illawarra
- Toby Crabel (born 1955), American commodities trader and professional tennis player
- Toby Creswell (born 1955), Australian music journalist, editor, and author
- Toby Cunliffe-Steel (fl. 2007–), New Zealand rower, sports administrator, and brain tumour survivor
- Toby Curtis (1939–2022), New Zealand educator and Māori leader
- Toby Davis (fl. 2006–), British racing driver
- Toby Dawson (born 1979), Korean-American mogul skier
- Toby Dodge (fl. 2003–), English political scientist
- Toby Down (born 1994), English-Chinese association footballer
- Toby Driver (born 1978), American musician, record producer, and songwriter
- Toby Edser (born 1999), English professional association footballer
- Toby Elder (1934–2005), Australian rules footballer for Fitzroy
- Tobias "Toby" Ellwood (born 1966), British politician, soldier, and author
- Toby Emmerich (born 1963), American film producer, executive, and screenwriter
- Toby Everett (born 1995), English professional rugby league footballer
- Toby Foster (born 1969), English comedian, actor, radio presenter, promoter and festival producer
- Toby Fox (born 1991), American video game developer, songwriter, composer, and voice actor
- Toby Foyeh (born 1952), British-Nigerian musician
- Toby Fricker (born 1995), American professional rugby union player
- Toby Froud (born 1984), English-American artist, special effects designer, puppeteer, filmmaker, and performer
- Toby Gad (born 1968), German record producer and songwriter
- Toby Garbett (born 1976), British rower
- Toby Gard (born 1972), English video game designer and consultant
- Toby Gardenhire (born 1982), American minor baseballer and manager
- Toby Gee (born 1980), British mathematician
- Toby Gerhart (born 1987), American professional footballer
- Toby Gilmore (c. 1742/1747–1812), African slave and soldier in the American Revolutionary War
- Toby Goodman (1948–2021), American politician
- Toby Goodshank (fl. 2001), musician and visual artist
- Toby Gowin (born 1975), American professional footballer
- Toby Green (born 1974), British historian
- Toby Green (publisher) (fl. 1980), English scholarly publisher
- Toby Greene (born 1993), Australian rules footballer for GWS
- Toby Hadoke (born 1974), English actor, writer, comedian, and comedy promoter
- Toby Hall (born 1975), American professional baseball player and coach
- Toby Hampson (born 1975), American attorney and judge
- Toby Harnden (born 1966), British-American author and journalist
- Toby Harrah (born 1948), American professional baseball player and coach
- Toby Harries (born 1998), British track and field athlete
- Toby Harris, Baron Harris of Haringey (born 1953), British Labour Party politician
- Toby Haynes (born 1977), British television director
- Toby Hemingway (born 1983), English actor
- Toby Henderson (born 1961), American bicycle motocross racer
- Toby Herald (born 1953), American politician
- Toby J. Heytens (born 1975), American attorney, law professor, and judge
- Toby Hill (1915–1977), Scottish trade unionist and watersider
- Toby Howard (born 1960), English academic
- Toby Howarth (born 1962), Church of England bishop
- Toby Huff (born 1942), American academic and emeritus professor
- Toby Hughes (born 1979), English cricketer
- Toby Hull (fl. 2003–), British actor and television writer
- Toby Huss (born 1966), American actor
- Toby Imada (born 1978), American mixed martial artist, grappler, and kickboxer
- Toby Jackson (born 1986), American footballer
- Toby James (born 1979), British political scientist and professor
- Toby Jenkins (born 1979), Australian water polo player
- Toby Jepson (born 1967), English guitarist, singer, songwriter, and lead vocalist of Little Angels
- Toby Jessel (1934–2018), British politician
- Toby "Theobald" Jones (1790–1868), Irish Royal Navy admiral, Tory politician, lichenologist and fossil collector
- Toby Jones (born 1966), English actor
- Toby Kane (born 1986), Australian para-alpine skier
- Toby Kebbell (born 1982), British actor
- Toby Keith Covel (1961–2024), American country music singer, songwriter, record producer, actor, and businessman
- Toby King (footballer, born 2002) (born 2002), English association footballer
- Toby King (rugby league) (born 1996), English professional rugby league player
- Toby Kodat (born 2003), American professional tennis player
- Toby Korrodi (born 1983), American college footballer
- Toby Lanzer (born 1965), American diplomat
- Toby Love (born 1985), Puerto Rican singer-songwriter
- TobyMac (born 1964), American rapper, singer, songwriter, and record producer
- Toby Martin (born 1975), Australian singer-songwriter, musician, academic, and lecturer
- Toby McGrath (born 1980), Australian rules footballer for South Fremantle
- Toby Meltzer (born 1957), American reconstructive surgeon
- Toby Moffett (born 1944), American politician
- Toby Moll (1890–1916), South African rugby union player
- Toby Moll (general) (born 1917), South African Chief of Defence
- Toby Nankervis (born 1994), Australian rules footballer for Richmond and Sydney
- Toby Neugebauer (born 1971), American billionaire, businessman, and political donor
- Toby Ng (born 1985), Canadian badminton player
- Toby Nixon (born 1959), American politician
- Toby Olubi (born 1987), British sprinter and bobsledder
- Toby Ord (born 1979), Australian philosopher
- Toby Peirce (born 1973), English cricketer
- Toby Philpott (born 1946), English puppeteer, clown, juggler, library technician, teacher, and street performer
- Toby Price (born 1987), Australian motorcycle racer
- Toby Radloff (born 1957), American film actor and file clerk
- Sir Alfre "Toby"d Rawlinson, 3rd Baronet (1867–1934), English soldier, intelligence officer, athlete, pioneer motorist, and aviator
- Toby Regbo (born 1991), English actor
- Toby Riddle (1848–1920), American Modoc woman and U.S. Army interpreter
- Toby Roberts (born 2005), British rock climber
- Toby Robinson (born 1996), English international swimmer
- Toby Roche (born 1988), English field hockey player
- Toby E. Rodes (1919–2013), German American business consultant, design critic, journalist, and lecturer
- Toby Roland-Jones (born 1988), English cricketer
- Toby Rollox (1913–unknown), West Indian cricketer and umpire
- Toby Romeo (born 2000), Austrian DJ and record producer
- Toby Ross (fl. 1970s–), American film pornographic film director
- Toby Roth (born 1938), American politician, businessman, and lobbyist
- Toby Rudolf (born 1996), Australian professional rugby league footballer for the Cronulla-Sutherland Sharks
- Toby Salmon (born 1993), English professional rugby union player
- Toby Samuel (born 2002), British professional tennis player
- Toby Sandeman (born 1988), English actor, model, and sprinter
- Toby Savin (born 2001), English professional association footballer
- Toby Scheckter (born 1978), South African racing driver
- Toby Schmitz (born 1977), Australian actor, playwright, director, and novelist
- Toby Scott (born 1948), American record producer, engineer, and sound mixer
- Toby Sebastian (born 1992), British actor and musician
- Toby Sedgwick (born 1958), British movement director, actor and theatre choreographer
- Toby Sexsmith (1885–1943), Canadian politician and ice hockey administrator
- Toby Sexton (born 2001), Australian professional rugby league footballer for the Catalans Dragons
- Toby Sheldon (1980–2015), German songwriter, reality television personality, and Justin Bieber look-alike
- Toby Sibbick (born 1999), Ugandan professional association footballer
- Toby Simkin (1964–2024), English theatrical producer and impresario
- Toby Sims (born 1997), English professional association footballer
- Toby Slater (1979–2021), English musician, singer-songwriter, guitarist and lead vocalist for Catch
- Toby Smith (1970–2017), English singer-songwriter, musician, and keyboardist for Jamiroquai
- Toby Smith (rugby union) (born 1988), Australian professional rugby union footballer
- Toby Sowery (born 1996), British racing driver
- Toby Spence (born 1969), British tenor and vocalist
- Toby Spribille (fl. 2011–), North American lichenologist
- Toby Stafford (born 1951), British mathematician and emeritus professor
- Toby Stephens (born 1969), English actor
- Toby Stevenson (pole vaulter) (born 1976), American Olympian
- Toby Stevenson (footballer) (born 1999), English professional association footballer
- Toby Steward (born 2005), English professional association footballer
- Toby Stock (fl. 2001–), American legal scholar and co-founder of online media company the Dispatch
- Toby Studebaker (born 1971), American soldier and convicted criminal
- Toby Suzuki (born 1943), business executive
- Toby Tarrant (born 1991), English radio presenter and broadcaster
- Toby Thompson, American politician
- Toby Thurstans (born 1980), Australian rules footballer for Port Adelaide
- Toby Tiangco (born 1967), Filipino politician and businessman
- Toby Toman (fl. 1970s–), English rock drummer
- Toby Truslove (fl. 2001–), Australian actor
- Toby Turner (born 1985), American internet personality, actor, comedian, and musician
- Toby Vintcent (born 1962), British writer, politician, investment manager, and former soldier
- Toby Wallace (born 1995), British-Australian actor
- Toby Weathersby (born 1996), American college footballer
- Toby Wilkinson (born 1969), English Egyptologist and academic
- Toby Wright (music producer) (fl. 1990s–), American record producer and mixing engineer
- Toby Wright (American football) (born 1970), American professional footballer
- Toby Wright (priest) (born 1975), British Anglican priest
- Toby Young (born 1963), British journalist, social commentator and Conservative life peer
- Toby Yurek (fl. 2022–), American politician

== Women ==
- Toby Lerner Ansin (born 1941), American founder of the Miami City Ballet
- Toby Buonagurio (fl. 1990s–), American artist
- Toby Claude (1877–1962), Irish actress and singer in vaudeville
- Toby Dancer (1953–2004), Canadian pianist and music producer
- Toby Fine (1932–2010), South African ballet dancer
- Toby Knobel Fluek (1926–2011), American Jewish artist born in Poland
- Toby Fournier (born 2005), Canadian college basketball player
- Toby T. Gati (born 1946), American government official
- Toby Hendy (born 1995), New Zealand science communicator and YouTuber
- Toby Kiers (born 1976), American evolutionary biologist
- Toby Leung (born 1983), Cantopop singer and actress from Hong Kong
- Toby Lightman (born 1978), American singer-songwriter
- Toby Orenstein (born 1937), American theatre founder, producer, and director
- Toby Riddle (1848–1920), Modoc interpreter
- Toby Robins (1931–1986), Canadian actress of film, stage and television
- Toby Saks (1942–2013), American cellist
- Toby Ann Stavisky (born 1939), American politician
- Toby Tarnow (born 1937), Canadian actress
- Toby Tse (born 2004), Hong Kong professional squash player
- Toby Wing (1915–2001), American actress and showgirl

== Fictional characters ==
- Sir Toby Belch, from Shakespeare's play Twelfth Night
- Toby Cavanaugh, in the second book of the Pretty Little Liars series and a recurring character on the TV series of the same name
- Toby Flenderson, on the TV series The Office
- Toby Hamee, from the Animorphs books by K. A. Applegate
- Toby Isaacs, on the TV series Degrassi: The Next Generation
- Toby Mangel, on the Australian soap opera Neighbours
- Toby Masuyo, character from Baraduke
- Toby Mills, on the British soap opera Hollyoaks
- Toby Ziegler, the White House Communications Director in the TV series The West Wing
- Toby the Tram Engine, from The Railway Series and Thomas & Friends
- Toby the Pup, in theatrical cartoons during 1930 and 1931
- Toby, on the animated series Beyblade: Metal Masters

== See also ==
- Tobias (given name), list of people with the name
- Tobey (given name), list of people with the name
- Tobin (given name), list of people with the name
- Tobyn (given name), list of people with the name
