= Newtown, Middlethird =

Name of three townlands in County Tipperary, Ireland

There are three townlands with the name Newtown, (Irish: An Baile Nua) in the Barony of Middle Third in County Tipperary, Ireland.

- Newtown in the civil parish of Erry
- Newtown in the civil parish of Baptistgrange
- Newtown in the civil parish of Knockgraffon, near the village of New Inn, where Edmond Kelly was born.

There are nineteen townlands known as Newtown in the whole of County Tipperary.
