= Boytonrath =

Townland in Ireland

Coordinates: 52.4635°N 7.9404°W

Boytonrath (Irish: Ráth an Bhaightiúnaigh) is a townland in the barony of Middle Third (South Tipperary), Ireland. It is a rural townland with, as of the 2011 census, a population of 88 people. The nearest town is New Inn. Formerly a parish in its own right, Boytonrath is now part of the parish of New Inn & Knockgraffon in the Roman Catholic Archdiocese of Cashel and Emly.

The families most associated with Boytonrath are the Tobins and the Loughnanes (O'Loughlins). These have evidently dwelt here from at least the 17th century, and are listed as being the chief occupants of the Middle Third in William Petty's 1659 Down Survey.

One large farmhouse, which is still occupied (by Loughnanes), dates from the 1640s or before. Also present are the ruined foundations of a castle. Also nearby is a small ruined church and its graveyard, which contains several headstones erected by families still resident in the area (including O'Donnells, Loughnanes and Tobins) which date from the 1700s.

A branch of the Butler dynasty were settled here in the seventeenth century, but following the Irish Rebellion of 1641 the family relocated to County Clare.
