= Tobin (surname) =

Tobin (Irish: Tóibín, pronounced [t̪ˠoːˈbʲiːnʲ]; from the Norman surname Saint Aubin, originated with Saint Albinus) is an Irish surname of Norman origin.

The Anglo-French Saint Aubin family arrived in Ireland in the wake of the Norman invasion in the 12th century and settled in Counties Tipperary and Kilkenny, and subsequently spread to the neighbouring counties of Cork and Waterford.

An early bearer of the surname is Irish-born John Tobyn, who appeared in patent rolls in 1413. By the 1440s there were three major Tobin clans established in south-east Tipperary, as well as the senior line in Kilkenny. The Tobins were an influential family in County Tipperary in medieval times, and the head of the family was known as the Baron of Coursey, although this was not an officially recognised title. The 14th century Annals of Ireland, by Kilkenny Franciscan John Clyn, described the Tobins as a turbulent sept more dreaded by the English settlers than the native Irish. Ballytobin in County Kilkenny, Ireland is named after them.

In the period 1847–1864, most bearers of the surname in Ireland were located in County Tipperary, County Kilkenny, County Cork, and County Waterford. As of 1881, most bearers of the surname in Great Britain were located in Lancashire.

Tobin is also an English surname, derived from the name Tobias or Toby.

== Arts and entertainment ==
- Amon Tobin (born 1972), Brazilian musician
- Becca Tobin (born 1986), American actress
- Candida Tobin (1926–2008), British music educator
- Christine Tobin (born 1963), Irish singer
- Colm Tobin, Irish screenwriter and television producer
- Colm Tóibín (born 1955), Irish novelist
- Genevieve Tobin (1899–1995), American actress
- George Tobin, American record producer
- George Tobin (American football) (1921–1999), American football player
- George Tobin (Royal Navy officer) (1768–1838), British naval officer and artist
- George T. Tobin (1864–1956), American illustrator
- James Tobin (born 1980), Australian TV personality
- Jason Tobin, British-Chinese actor
- John Tobin (dramatist) (1770–1804), British author of The Honeymoon, younger brother of George Tobin (Royal Navy officer)
- Julia Tobin (born 1955), British actress
- Louise Tobin (1918–2022), American singer
- Niall Tóibín (1929–2019), Irish comedian and actor
- Nioclás Tóibín (1928–1994), Irish traditional singer
- Orla Tobin, winner of the 2003 Rose of Tralee contest and singer
- Paul Tobin, American comic writer
- Steve Tobin (born 1957), American sculptor

== Military ==
- Edgar Gardner Tobin (1896–1954), American World War I flying ace
- John Michael Tobin (1841–1898), American Civil War officer
- Liam Tobin (1890–1963), Irish army officer
- Marian Tobin (1873–?), Irish War of Independence republican
- Paul E. Tobin, Jr. (born c. 1941), rear admiral in the U.S. Navy
- Thomas Tate Tobin (1823–1904), American adventurer and US Army scout

== Politics ==
- Brian Tobin (born 1954), Canadian Liberal politician
- Edmund William Tobin (1865–1938), Canadian politician
- James Tobin, George W. Bush's 2004 New England campaign chairman
- John M. Tobin (born 1969), American politician
- Maurice J. Tobin (1901–1953), U.S. governor and Secretary of Labor
- Peadar Tóibín (born 1974), Irish politician
- Stanley Tobin (1871–1948), Canadian farmer and politician
- Stephen Tobin (1836–1905), Canadian political figure

== Religion ==
- Bernadette Tobin, Australian Catholic ethicist
- Joseph William Tobin (born 1952), American Roman Catholic archbishop
- Mary Luke Tobin (1908–2006), American Roman Catholic nun
- Nettie Tobin (1863–1944), American member of the Bahai community
- Thomas Joseph Tobin (born 1948), American Roman Catholic bishop

== Science ==
- William Tobin (1953–2022), British–New Zealand astronomer
- Elaine M. Tobin (born 1944), American biologist

== Sports ==
- Alex Tobin (born 1965), Australian soccer player
- Bert Tobin (1910–1969), Australian cricketer
- Bill Tobin (American football) (1941–2024), American football player and executive
- Bill Tobin (baseball) (1854–1912), major-league baseball first baseman
- Bill Tobin (ice hockey) (1895–1963), Canadian ice hockey player and coach
- Brendan Toibin (born 1964), American football player
- Brian Tobin (hurler) (1949–2006), Irish hurler
- Brian Tobin (tennis) (1930–2024), Australian tennis player and executive
- Charlie Tobin (1919–1996), Irish hurler
- Elgie Tobin, American football coach. Coach of the 1920 Akron Pros, which were the first NFL champions
- Frank Tobin, English rugby union footballer who played in the 1860s and 1870s
- Frederic Tobin (1849–1914), English cricketer
- Jack Tobin (1892–1969), major-league baseball right fielder
- Jim Tobin (1912–1969), baseball player
- John Tobin (born 1959), Australian rugby league player
- Johnny Tobin (1921–1982), baseball player
- JP Tobin (born 1977), New Zealand windsurfer
- Kevin Tobin (born 1981), Irish hurler
- Pat Tobin (born 1982), Irish hurler
- Paul Tobin (1909–2003), American basketball player
- Rebecca Tobin (born 1988), American basketball player
- Robert Tobin (born 1983), British sprinter
- Vince Tobin (born 1943), American football coach

== Other people ==
- Austin Joseph Tobin (1903–1978), executive director of the Port of New York Authority
- Benedette Moore Tobin (1849–1901), American clubwoman
- Ciarán Tobin, Irish citizen involved in a Hungarian legal case
- Daniel J. Tobin (1875–1955), American union leader
- Desmond Tobin, Irish academic, researcher and author
- Florence Sloane Burden Tobin (1873–1960), American socialite
- James Tobin (1918–2002), American Nobel Prize-winning economist
- Jonathan S. Tobin, American journalist
- Joseph Tobin (born 1950), American early childhood education specialist
- Laura Tobin (born 1981), British broadcast meteorologist
- Margaret Tobin (disambiguation), several people
- Martin J. Tobin (born 1951), Irish-American pulmonologist
- Neil Tobin (born 1966), American magician
- Niall Tóibín (1929–2019), Irish comedian and actor
- Peter Tobin (1946–2022), Scottish serial killer
- Robert Deam Tobin (1961–2022), American academic
- Thomas Tobin (1807–1881), British businessman
- Tony Tobin, British celebrity chef
- William Tobin (journalist) (1927–2009), American news editor

== See also ==
- Tobin (disambiguation)
- Tobin (given name)
- Tonin (name)
