= James Waterhouse =

James Waterhouse may refer to:

- James Waterhouse (photographer) (1842–1922), English photographer
- James Waterhouse (journalist) (born 1986), English journalist and former professional rugby union player
