= Paul Tobin =

Paul Tobin may refer to:

- Paul Tobin (Medal of Honor), United States Navy sailor and Medal of Honor recipient
- Paul E. Tobin Jr. (born c. 1941), United States Navy officer
- Paul Tobin (author), American comic writer
- Paul Tobin (basketball) (1909–2003), American basketball player
