= Evan Nierman =

American executive & author (born 1978)

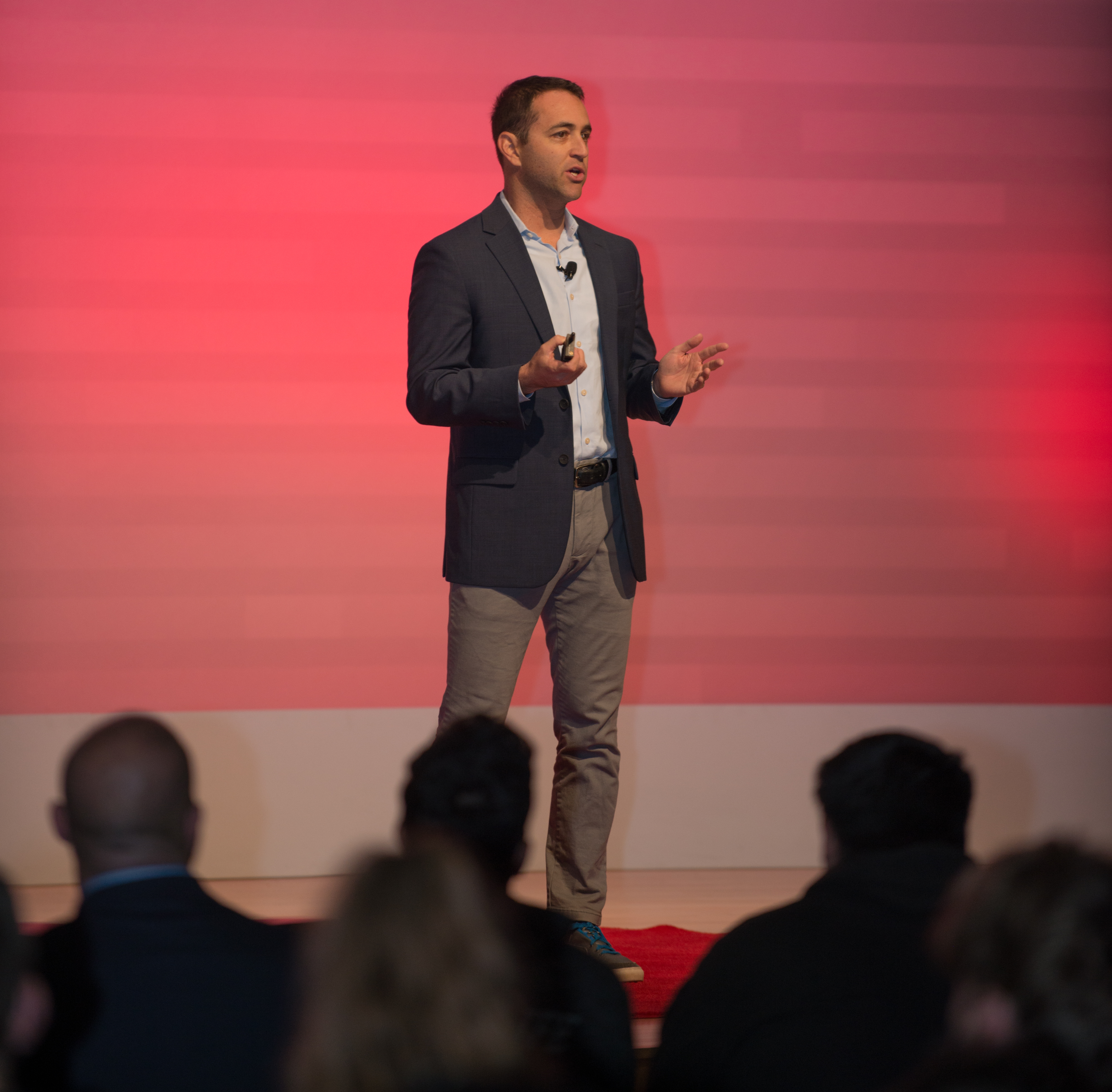
Evan Nierman speaking to an audience at a TEDx event in 2019.

Evan Nierman (born June 20, 1978) is an American public relations and crisis management executive and author. He is the founder and CEO of Red Banyan, a strategic communications firm specializing in crisis PR and reputation management. He is the author of Crisis Averted and The Cancel Culture Curse.

== Early life and education ==
Evan Nierman was born in Shreveport, Louisiana, on June 20, 1978. He graduated with a B.A. in communications from George Washington University in 2000. His early interests included media, politics, and public relations.

== Career ==
=== Public relations and crisis management ===
Nierman began his professional career at the American Israel Public Affairs Committee (AIPAC), where he was responsible for overseeing key publications, writing speeches, drafting foreign policy briefings for legislators, and organizing national events on Middle East policy.

In 2011, he founded Red Banyan, a strategic communications firm focused on crisis management, reputation repair, and public relations.

Through Red Banyan, Nierman represented former LaFace Skincare CEO Lisa Alexander following a viral confrontation that led to intense public scrutiny; managed communications for the democratically elected government of Niger during the 2023 Nigerian coup d'état and its participation in the U.S.-Africa Leaders Summit; and assisted the Florida Holocaust Museum through a controversy involving graffiti.

=== Media presence and commentary ===
He has appeared in various media and has been featured in several prominent outlets, including CNN, Newsweek,Business Insider, and The Jerusalem Post, where he has provided analysis on controversies, brand crises, and public fallout involving celebrities, corporations, and political figures.

Nierman contributes to publications including Forbes and Fast Company. His commentary often explores the reputational risks posed by online backlash, misinformation, and viral content, as well as how business leaders and public figures can proactively protect their brands.

=== Books and publications ===
Evan Nierman is the author of two books on public relations and crisis management. His first book, Crisis Averted: PR Strategies to Protect Your Reputation and the Bottom Line (2021), offers a behind-the-scenes look at real-world crises and the strategies used to manage them.

In 2023, he published The Cancel Culture Curse: From Rage to Redemption in a World Gone Mad, which examines the rise of cancel culture and its impact on free expression, reputations, and redemption in the digital age.

Nierman has written opinion pieces and commentary for news outlets on media, politics, and crisis response. His work has been published in the Baltimore Sun, The Hill, The Jerusalem Post, and TheWrap.

== Views and advocacy ==
Nierman is a critic of cancel culture and its impact on free speech, due process, and reputational fairness and the impact of digital mob justice, where individuals and organizations can face severe backlash without the opportunity to respond or defend themselves.
