= Tobin =

Tobin may refer to:

== Name ==
- Tobin (surname)
- Tobin (given name)

== Places in the United States ==
- Tobin, California
- Tobin Bridge, near Boston, Massachusetts
- Tobin Bridge (California)
- Tobin Range, a mountain range in Nevada
- Tobin Township, Perry County, Indiana
- Tobin, Wisconsin
- Breitmeyer-Tobin Building, in Detroit, Michigan

== Fictional characters ==
- Princess Tobin, a character in Melanie Rawn's Dragon Prince series of fantasy novels
- Prince Tobin, the main character in The Bone Doll's Twin by Lynn Flewelling
- Mitch Tobin, protagonist of five mystery novels by Donald Westlake
- Tobin, a supporting character in the Fire Emblem franchise, who appears in Fire Emblem: Gaiden and its remake, Fire Emblem Echoes: Shadows of Valentia.
- Beef Tobin and his kids from the animated sitcom, The Great North
- A character from the TV series The Walking Dead

== Other uses ==
- Tobin tax, a currency exchange tax first proposed by James Tobin
- Tobin's q, an economic measure developed by James Tobin

== See also ==
- Tobing, a surname
- Toby
