= Tobyn =

Tobyn is a masculine given name.

Notable people with the name include:

- Tobyn Horton (born 1986), British professional road racing cyclist
- Tobyn Murray (born 2005), Australian rules footballer for Fremantle

== See also ==
- Tobin (given name), list of people with the name
- Toby (given name), list of people with the name
