= Garranlea =

Townland in County Tipperary, Ireland

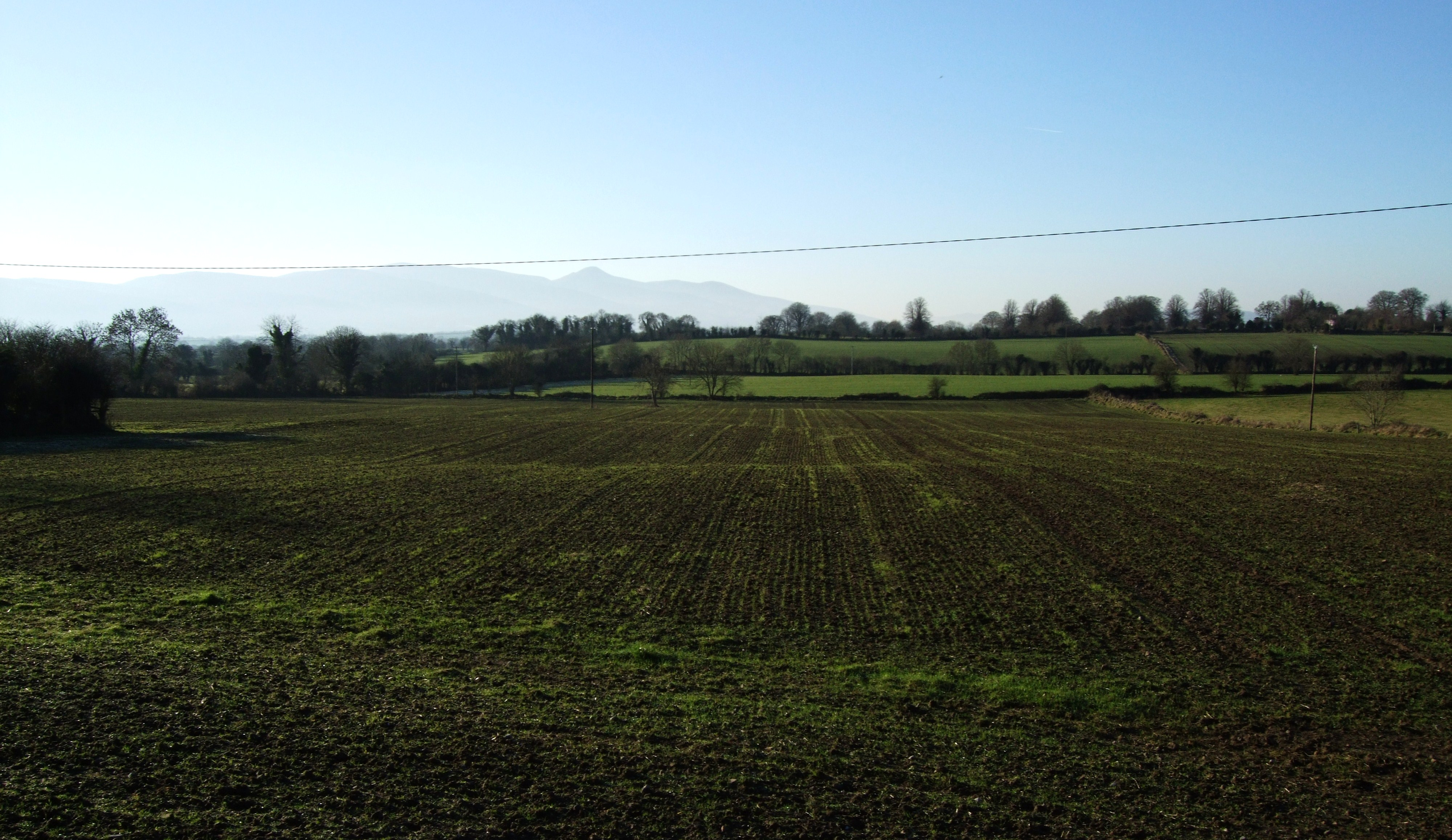
Garranlea countryside

Garranlea (Irish: Carn Léith) is a townland in the Roman Catholic parish of "New Inn and Knockgraffon" in County Tipperary, Ireland. It is in the civil parish of Knockgraffon. Like many Irish townlands, Garranlea is very old, and almost certainly dates to the Early Christian period, if not before. It was documented in the 1659 Down Survey undertaken by William Petty, and had at that time a population of twelve.

Today Garranlea is almost exclusively an agricultural area, covering approximately 500 hectares. Dairy and sheep farming are the principal activities. Garranlea House was the residence of the Cooneys, a Catholic landowning family prominent in the area during the 19th century and the first half of the 20th century.

There is also an old Catholic cemetery in Garranlea, where Moll MacArthy, a local woman who was murdered in the 1940s, is buried.
