= Sam Jones (rugby union) =

English rugby union player

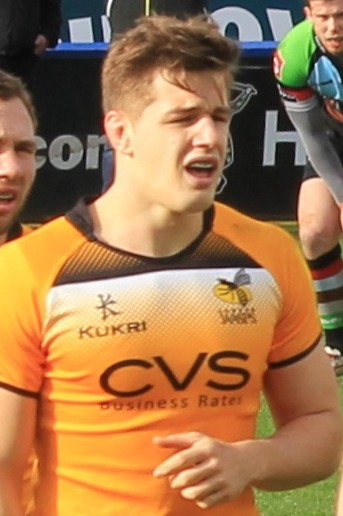
- Jones against Harlequins in 2014
- Born: Samuel Frederick Jones; 15 December 1991 (age 34) Aylesbury, England
- Height: 6 ft 3 in (1.91 m)
- Weight: 17 st 11 lb (113 kg)
- School: Aylesbury Grammar School

Rugby union career
- Position: Back-row
Amateur team(s)
Years	Team	Apps	(Points)
- Aylesbury
Senior career
Years	Team	Apps	(Points)
2010-2018	Wasps RFC	73	(20)
- Correct as of 19 March 2014
International career
Years	Team	Apps	(Points)
- England U16
- England U18
- England U20
2013	Barbarians		

Samuel Frederick Jones (born 15 December 1991) is an English former rugby union player.

Jones studied at Aylesbury Grammar School and King's College London.

He played rugby for England U-16, U-18 and U-20, and Wasps RFC in the Aviva Premiership. In 2013 he was called up to the Barbarian's team to play England and the British & Irish Lions.

On 30 September 2016 Jones was called up to the senior England squad by coach Eddie Jones for the Autumn Internationals. While training with England he suffered multiple leg injuries in a judo session, which ruled him out of the Tests and led to his retirement in March 2018.
