= Aylesbury Grammar School =

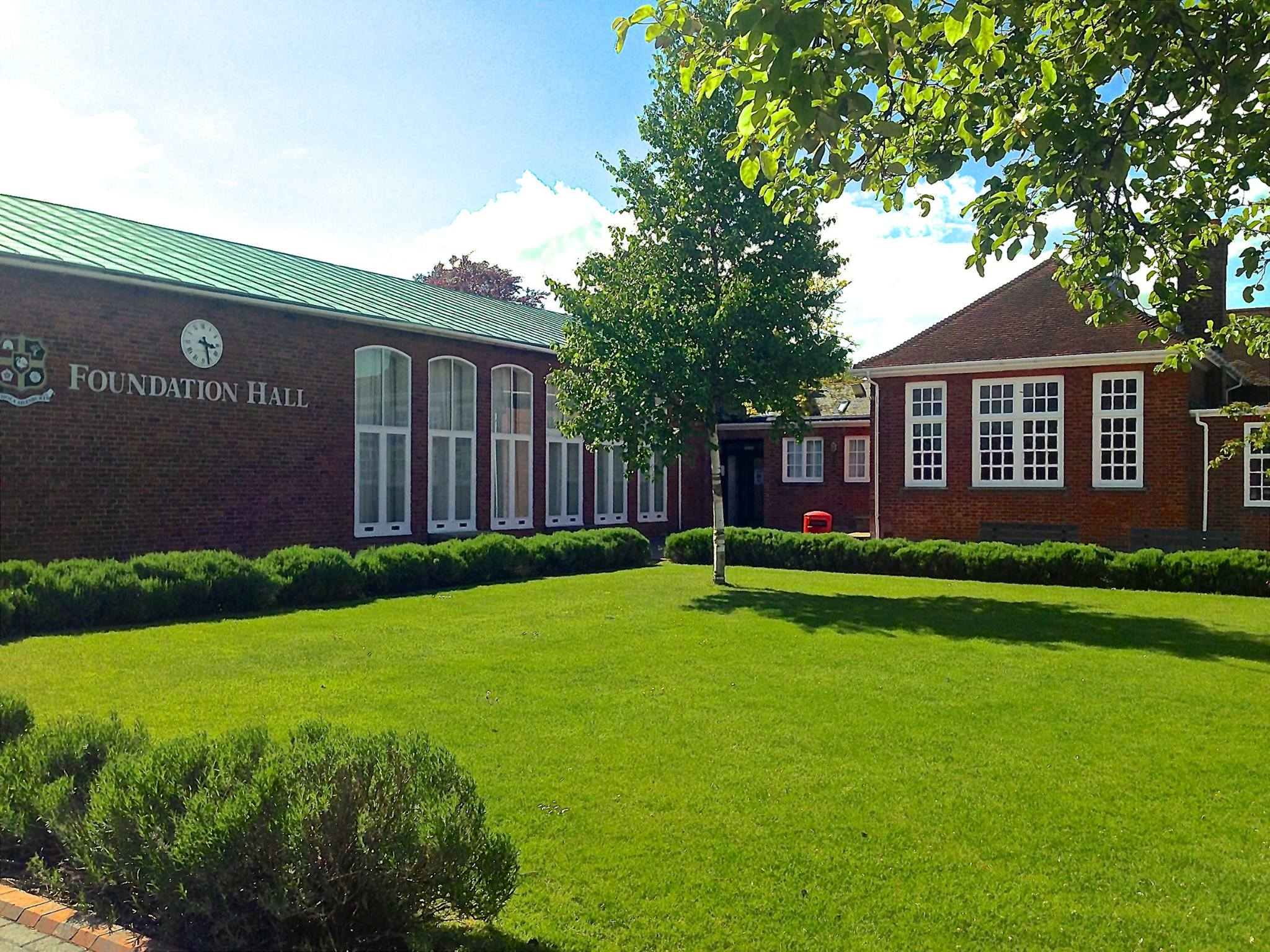
- School badge Foundation Hall, photograph taken from the Headmasters Quad

Location
- Walton Road; Aylesbury, Buckinghamshire, HP21 7RP; England; 51.8139°N 0.8014°W

Information
- Type: 11–18 boys Academy and Grammar School
- Motto: Latin: Schola Ailesburia, Floreat Ailesburia; Educate Aylesbury, let Aylesbury flourish
- Established: 1598; 428 years ago
- Founder: Sir Henry Lee
- Specialists: Science (Primary); Languages (Secondary); Maths & Computing
- Department for Education URN: 136884 Tables
- Headmaster: Mark Sturgeon
- Staff: 150 Teaching & Support staff
- Gender: Boys
- Age: 11 to 18
- Enrolment: 1,329 boys
- Houses: Denson; Hampden; Lee; Paterson; Phillips; Ridley
- Colour
- Publication: The Aylesburian
- Former pupils: Old Aylesburians
- Website: Aylesbury Grammar School

Aylesbury Grammar School is an 11–18 boys grammar school in Aylesbury, in the English county of Buckinghamshire. The school has a population of approximately 1300 boys. Founded in 1598 by Sir Henry Lee, Champion of Queen Elizabeth I, Aylesbury Grammar School celebrated 100 years on its current site in Walton Road in 2007. It is commonly referred to by its students, staff, and locals by the abbreviation AGS.

== History ==
=== Formation ===
Aylesbury Grammar School was founded in 1598 following a bequest from Sir Henry Lee of Ditchley, the Champion of Queen Elizabeth I, and its first home was in St Mary's Church in Aylesbury. In 1714, Henry Phillips left a sum of £5,000 for the purchase of lands of inheritance for the enlargement and further provision for the Free School in Aylesbury. The money left was to be used to admit a total of 120 boys to be taught for free, with the school building to be furnished with books, pens, ink and paper. Ten trustees were appointed by the High Court in 1717, becoming the first trustees of what is now the Aylesbury Grammar School Foundation. The school building opened in October 1720.

The quality of education varied, and sometimes met stark criticism from the people of the town. Complaints heard at an enquiry in 1849 included boys being required to perform domestic service for the masters, including doing the headmaster’s laundry "all day", while exams were conducted with "much whispering and talking among the boys".

By the mid-1880s, inadequacies on the school site were becoming more apparent, with a particular issue arising from the lack of games facilities. Additionally, the old buildings of the school were beginning to decay, and suggestions were made that fees of £4 to £6 might be charged with provision of scholarships for poorer boys on grounds of merit from public elementary schools of the district to assist in fundraising to deal with the inadequacies that school was facing. Accordingly, 1885 saw a plan to reform AGS as "a good day school in which boys of the middle class [...] may receive such education as will best suit them for the business of life".

=== Coeducational school ===
The school was a boys' school from its foundation in 1598 until 1907, when the school relocated to its present site on Walton Road. The new premises were designed by local architect Fred Taylor A.R.I.B.A. The guest of honour at the opening ceremony was Lord Rothschild, who had offered the land for purchase to Buckinghamshire County Council to build the school. A condition for receiving funding for the new premises was that the school should become co-educational. The school was thus a co-educational independent school until 1952, when it became apparent that the school was rapidly outgrowing its site.

=== Second World War ===
Ealing County Boys' School (now West London College) was evacuated to Buckinghamshire until July 1942. The Ealing County Girls' School was evacuated to Wycombe High School.

The Ealing boys' school headteacher was Mr William James Dudman, born 1888, who was later killed when at home on Thursday 26 September 1940, on Inglis Road, with wife Nora Annie (nee Curtis), born in 1891, in a German air raid; he had been the headteacher from 1930.

Three of the headteacher's four sons were all later killed in action during the war; the eldest, Pilot Officer James, was in 625 Squadron in Avro Lancaster ND742 aged 26, on 11 June 1944 over Bois-d'Arcy, Yvelines, flying from RAF Kelstern in Lincolnshire; the next-eldest son, Lt Peter, was in Monte Cassino on 11 November 1943 with the Bucks LA; and 2nd Lt Richard Anthony (4 January 1920 - 11 February 1942) was killed at El Alamein, with the Buckinghamshire Light Infantry, aged 22. The headteacher's remaining son George lived until 1985.

=== Single sex school ===
Plans for a new school were made; the Council decided to reinstate AGS's single-sex status as a voluntary controlled school, and in 1959 the girls of Aylesbury Grammar School moved into their new school on the opposite side of the road, now called Aylesbury High School. Regular concerts, plays, and theatre visits allow links to be maintained between Aylesbury Grammar School and the High School.

On 9 May 2014, boys at the school dressed up as the Jamaican bobsleigh team for their school-leaving celebrations and 'blacked up' as part of their costume. This came to public attention when an image of the schoolboys was tweeted by the then-headmaster Stephen Lehec and was widely criticised for racism. Lehec issued a formal apology, though in his analysis 'at no time was there an undertone of any act being of a derogatory or racist nature'. The matter was widely reported in local and national media.

== Background ==
=== Admissions ===
As a selective state school, AGS's entry requirements are dictated by the Buckinghamshire Transfer Test, formerly known as the '11-plus'. The school also takes students from outside the catchment area or out-of-county locations such as Thame and Milton Keynes, if spaces remain after all qualified in-catchment candidates have taken up their places. The school educates boys from the age of 11, in Year 7, through to the age of 18, in Year 13. The school has its largest intakes at Year 7 followed by Year 12.

The school is situated east of Aylesbury town centre on the southern side of the A41, between Walton (to the west) and Victoria Park (to the east). This site was built and opened in 1907, replacing an earlier building in St. Mary's Square in the town centre, which now forms part of the Buckinghamshire Museum.

=== Specialist status ===
In September 1997 the school was awarded specialist school status in Technology, and later successfully gained Science College status as its primary specialism. In April 2006 AGS gained a second college status as a Language College and then gained a second secondary college status in Maths and Computing in January 2008. The Specialist School programme was ended by the Government in 2010.

=== Academy status ===
In July 2011 the school became an Academy.

== Academic performance ==
In 2009, the school achieved the highest A-level results in Buckinghamshire. Following a report conducted by OFSTED in November 2022, the school was ranked as "outstanding" in all areas, with inspectors claiming that "pupils flourish in this outstanding school". Behaviour displayed by boys attending the school was praised, as was the manner in which the boys conduct themselves and their attitudes they apply to their learning.

Academic attainment results published by the school in 2023 found that 99.5% of boys attending the school achieved 5 or more GCSEs at grades 9 - 4, whilst 78% of boys achieved 5 or more GCSEs at grades 9 - 7. 45% of all boys who were entered for GCSE examinations were graded 9-8, above the National average which stood at 12%.

== Notable former pupils ==
- Will Adam (b. 1969) Archdeacon of Canterbury
- James Marriott (b. 1997) musician
- Jake Arnott (b. 1961) author
- Tim Besley, economist and former member of the Bank of England's Monetary Policy Committee
- Angela Billingham (b. 31 July 1939), politician
- Rutland Boughton (1878–1960), composer
- Jules Buckley (b. 1980), conductor
- Scott Davies, (b. 1988), professional footballer
- Tom Dyckhoff, (b. 1971), architecture critic and TV presenter
- Sir Aidan Eardley, (b. 1970), High Court Judge
- John Edwards OBE (1904–1959), Labour MP from 1950–9 for Brighouse and Spenborough
- David Gurr (b. 1956), cricketer for Oxford University and Somerset
- Alaric Hall (b. 1979), philologist
- Tim Harford (b. 1973), journalist and presenter
- Arthur Hughes (b. 1992), actor
- Theo James (b. 1984), actor and producer
- Sam Jones, (b. 1991), professional rugby player for Wasps RFC
- Peter Jukes (b. 1960), author and journalist
- Richard Lee (b. 1982), footballer
- David Millar (b. 1977), cyclist and commentator
- Christian Purslow (b.1963), former managing director of Liverpool Football Club, chief executive of Aston Villa Football Club
- Mike Rowe, (b. 1970), musician
- Andy Riley, (b. 1970), author and scriptwriter
- Eddie Robson, (b. 1978), author and scriptwriter
- Peter Smith, biologist
- Rob Stringer, chairman of Columbia/Epic Label Group, and brother of Sir Howard Stringer
- Sir Andrew Twigger, High Court Judge.
- Shailesh Vara, (b.1960), former Secretary of State for Northern Ireland
- Toby Vintcent, (b.1962), writer and politician
- James Waterhouse (b. 1986), journalist and former professional rugby union player
- Alex Wilkie, (b. 1948), mathematician
- Theodore Zeldin CBE, author and historian

== See also ==
- Aylesbury High School
- Dr Challoner's Grammar School
- Royal Grammar School
- Sir William Borlase's Grammar School
- List of English and Welsh endowed schools (19th century)
- Ofsted Inspection Report
