= Tobin (given name) =

Tobin (Irish: Tóibín, from the Norman surname de St. Aubyn) is a unisex given name of Irish origin.

Notable people with the name include:

- Tobin Bell (born 1942), American actor
- Tobin Esperance (born 1979), American musician and bassist for Papa Roach
- Tobin Heath (born 1988), American professional association footballer and entrepreneur
- Tobin Rote (1928–2000), American professional footballer
- Tobin Sorenson (1955–1980), American rock climber and alpinist
- Tobin Sprout (born 1955), American musician, songwriter, visual artist, and author, best known as the guitarist for Guided by Voices

== Middle name ==
- M. T. Anderson (born Matthew Tobin Anderson; 1968), American author

== See also ==
- Tobin (disambiguation)
- Tobin (surname)
- Toby (given name), list of people with the name
- Tobyn (given name), list of people with the name
- Tonin (name), list of people with the given name and surname
