= Tobing =

Tobing is a surname. Notable people with the surname include:

- Gordon Tobing (1925–1993), Indonesian singer
- Joy Tobing (born 1980), Indonesian singer
- Naek Tobing (1940–2020), Indonesian physician, sexologist, and author
- Ria Tobing (1938–2017), Indonesian swimmer

== See also ==
- Ferdinand Lumban Tobing Airport
- Tobin (disambiguation)
