= Florida Holocaust Museum =

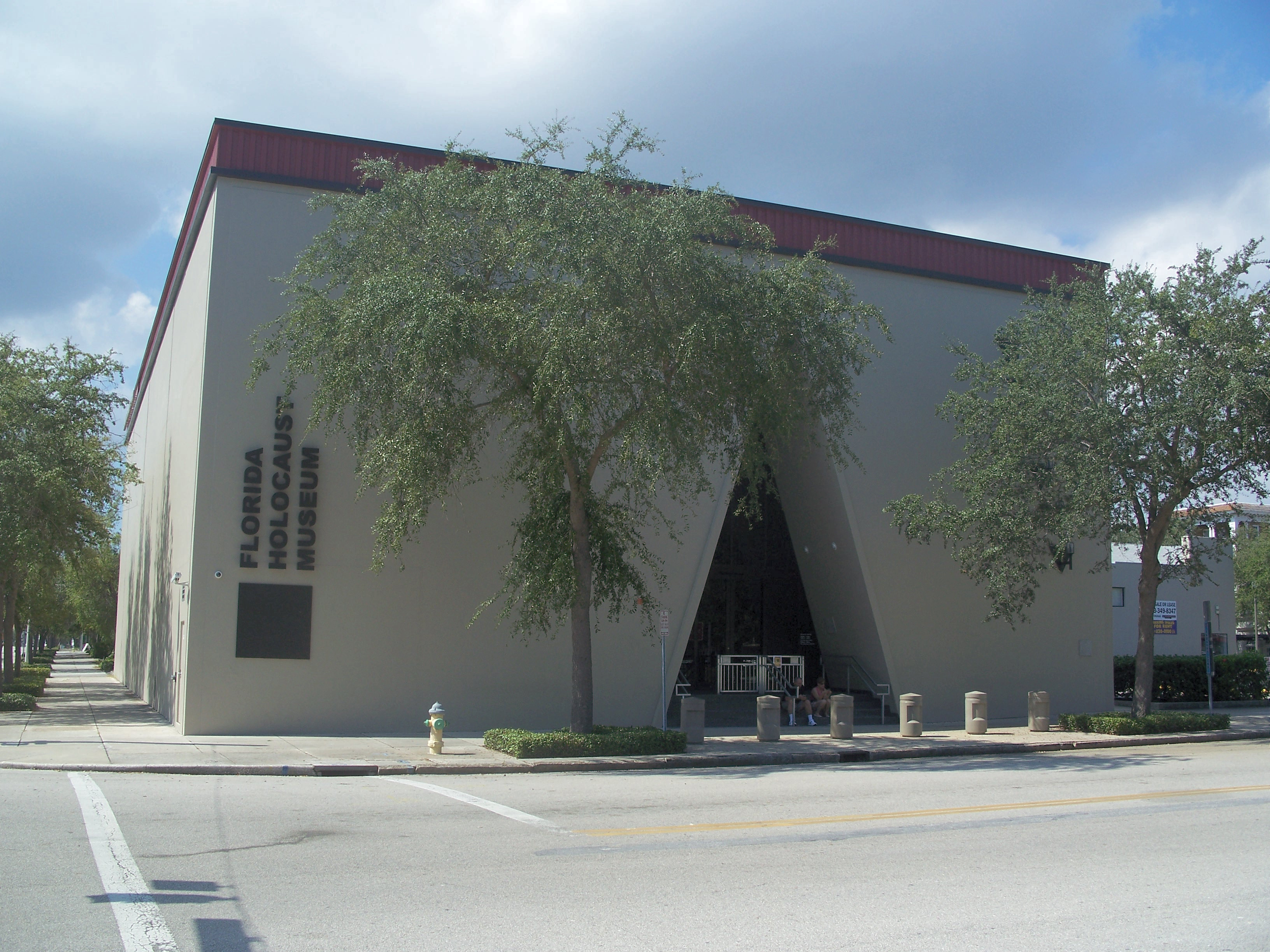

- Location within Florida
- Location: St. Petersburg, Florida
- Coordinates: 27.770529°N 82.640622°W
- Type: Holocaust museum
- Website: www.thefhm.org

The Florida Holocaust Museum is a Holocaust museum located at 55 Fifth Street South in St. Petersburg, Florida. Founded in 1992, it moved to its current location in 1998. Previously known as the Holocaust Center, the museum officially changed to its name to the Florida Holocaust Museum in 1999. It is one of the largest Holocaust museums in the United States. It was founded by Walter and Edith Lobenberg both of whom were German Jews who escaped persecution in Nazi Germany by immigrating to the United States. Elie Wiesel, a Holocaust survivor and winner of the Nobel Peace Prize, was Honorary Chairman and cut the ribbon at the 1998 opening ceremony. The museum reopened on September 2025 after one year closing for major renovations including reinforced security in response to rising antisemitic incidents, upgraded gallery layout and accessibility. The museum hosts since 2025 an interactive experience created by the USC Shoah Foundation that allows visitors to ask questions to pre-recorded holocaust survivors.The Florida Holocaust Museum is one of three Holocaust Museums that are accredited by the American Alliance of Museums. The museum works with the local community and survivors of the Holocaust to spread awareness and to educate the public on the history of the Holocaust.

== History ==
=== Founders ===
The Florida Holocaust Museum was founded by Walter Loebenberg and his wife Edith Loebenberg in 1992. Both of them had been born in Germany and had escaped Nazi persecution. Walter Loebenberg was born in Wächtersbach, Germany, but due to Nazi prosecution of his father and the subsequent difficulties in running the family store, the Loebenberg family moved to Frankfurt in 1936. It was in Frankfurt in 1938 that the Loebenberg family experienced Kristallnacht, with Walter narrowly escaping physical harm and being forced to hide. Eventually, through the support of an aunt already living in the United States, Walter Loebenberg was able to immigrate successfully and eventually moved to Chicago. He then served in the United States Army for the duration of the World War II after being drafted in 1942.

After completing his time in the military, Walter Loebenberg would go on to meet Edith Loebenberg, leading to their marriage in 1948.

=== Museum ===
The Holocaust Museum was founded for "teaching the members of all races and cultures the inherent worth and dignity of life in order to prevent future genocides" as the Holocaust Center in a space that was rented from the Jewish Community Center (JCC) of Pinellas County in Madeira Beach. The museum started as a collection of 10 Holocaust posters which the founders had acquired over the years. At the JCC, the Holocaust Center hosted its first exhibit, 'Anne Frank in the World', which would attract 24,000 visitors within the first month. It began to run teaching seminars, lectures, and commemorative events and to provide schools in an eight county area surrounding Tampa Bay with study guides, teacher training programs, and presentations by Center staff and Holocaust survivors.

By 1996, the Holocaust Center had grown so that the board of directors voted to buy and renovate a new building. This building was a former bank that was over five times the original space (27,000 square feet). The architect was the Israeli-born Nick Benjacob. The move was completed in 1998. In January 1999, the Holocaust Center officially changed its name to the Florida Holocaust Museum. Elie Wiesel attended the 1998 opening ceremony in which he served as the Honorary Chairman.

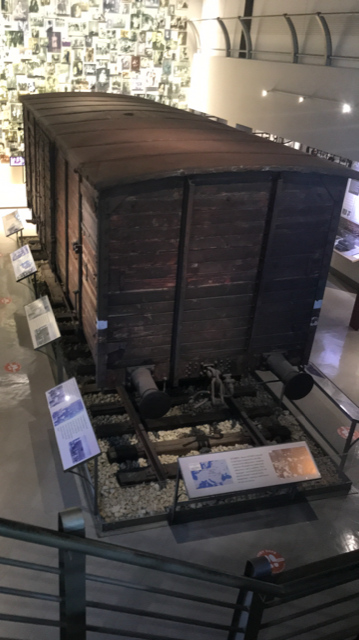
Boxcar on display at Florida Holocaust Museum

The new building had 65,000 visitors in its first year. The current building has three floors with a permanent exhibit, an extensive archive area on the first floor, and temporary and traveling galleries on the second and third floors. The first major exhibition was the boxcar #113 069-5, which later became part of the permanent collection.

The renovated museum re-opened in September 2025 also hosts the Elie Wiesel Collection, select works from Elie Wiesel's personal collection entrusted to the Museum by the Elie Wiesel Foundation for Humanity, after that Wiesel and his wife spent many years in St Petersburg where he taught at Eckerd College.

=== Vandalism ===
On May 27, 2021, the phrase "Jews are guilty" and a swastika were spray-painted on the museum's exterior.

== Exhibits ==
=== Permanent collection ===
The permanent collection of the Florida Holocaust Museum is housed on the first floor in an exhibit titled: "History, Heritage, and Hope". This exhibit features various artifacts from the period and takes the form of a self-guided audio tour through the history of the Holocaust beginning with the history of antisemitism and life before World War II, followed by the rise of Hitler, Nazis, and anti-Jewish legislation. The history of other victim groups, ghettos and rescue are shown as well.

The centerpiece of the permanent collection is an actual box car #113 069-5 (from Gdynia, Poland) that transported victims of the Nazi regime to the concentration camps. It rests upon original track from the Treblinka Killing Center as a silent tribute to those murdered in the Holocaust. The collection of artist and Holocaust survivor Toby Knobel Fluek is in the museum's permanent collection.

in 2025 another artifact was added, a 10-ton Danish fishing boat which belonged to the flotilla that secretly evacuated almost all Jews of Denmark to Sweden to save them from the Nazis.

=== Temporary exhibits ===
On the second and third floors of the building, temporary exhibits are hosted with topics varying from artistic interpretations of the events of the Holocaust to informative exhibits which illuminate related topics, such as the Nuremberg Trials. The third floor also features a large open gallery in which lectures, presentations and events are held as well. Currently on display is the innovative, interactive exhibit, Dimensions in Testimony. This exhibit allows visitors to ask questions that prompt real-time responses from pre-recorded video interviews with Holocaust survivors. This pioneering project integrates advanced filming techniques, specialized display technologies and next generation natural language processing to create an interactive biography. Also on display is Matezevot for Everyday Use, an exhibit of photographs of tombstones marking Jewish graves. During the war, cemeteries were razed to make room for new buildings and courtyards, while the matezevot were repurposed to make items such as pavers, foundations, and grinding stones, many of them still bearing the Hebrew inscriptions that told the stories of the graves' deceased. A special exhibit, Humanity behind Barbed Wire, informs the visitor about a little known occurrence in Florida history, the internment of more than 10,000 German prisoners of war throughout the state, including McDill Air Force Base in Tampa.

== Programs ==
The Florida Holocaust Museum additionally runs several programs of outreach within the community with the aim of continuing their mission of raising awareness of human rights. They include "Speak Up, Speak Now!", which is a multi-session program that aims to engage students in discussion and includes guest speakers such as Holocaust survivors, law enforcement officers, and activists. The Anne Frank Humanitarian award, established in 2001, recognizes high school juniors who have shown humanitarian efforts in and outside of school. The museum also provides police agencies in Florida with Law Enforcement And Society (LEAS) lessons, which are meant to educate officers about the role that German police had in the Holocaust. Additionally, the Generations After group is made up of the daughters, sons, and grandchildren of Holocaust survivors, who are dedicated to telling their families' stories.

In November 2026 the museum launches the inaugural Elie Wiesel symposium created as a collaborative academic and community summit focused on contemporary human rights issue, countering antisemitism and preserving survivor testimonies.

== Education ==
Florida was one of the first states to mandate Holocaust education in public K-12 schools. Notably the museum played a crucial role in getting the legislation passed in 1994. The Florida Holocaust Museum sends speakers to schools and brings classes to the museum. As part of its education program, teachers can borrow material for teaching about the Holocaust for free. In 2014 the trunks cost $300 to ship around the US, reached 17 states, and impacted around 50,000 people.

The Florida Holocaust Museum also offers school-group docent-led tours. School group tours take about two hours and are available for fifth through twelfth grades.

The museum offers free after-school workshops to all teachers in the state of Florida.

In response to COVID-19, the Florida Holocaust Museum created a Virtual Education Outreach Program.

== Volunteer ==
The Florida Holocaust Museum also runs volunteer programs and is one of the organizations where young Austrians can serve their Austrian Holocaust Memorial Service.

== See also ==
- Austrian Holocaust Memorial Service
