= Knockgraffon =

Civil parish in County Tipperary, Ireland

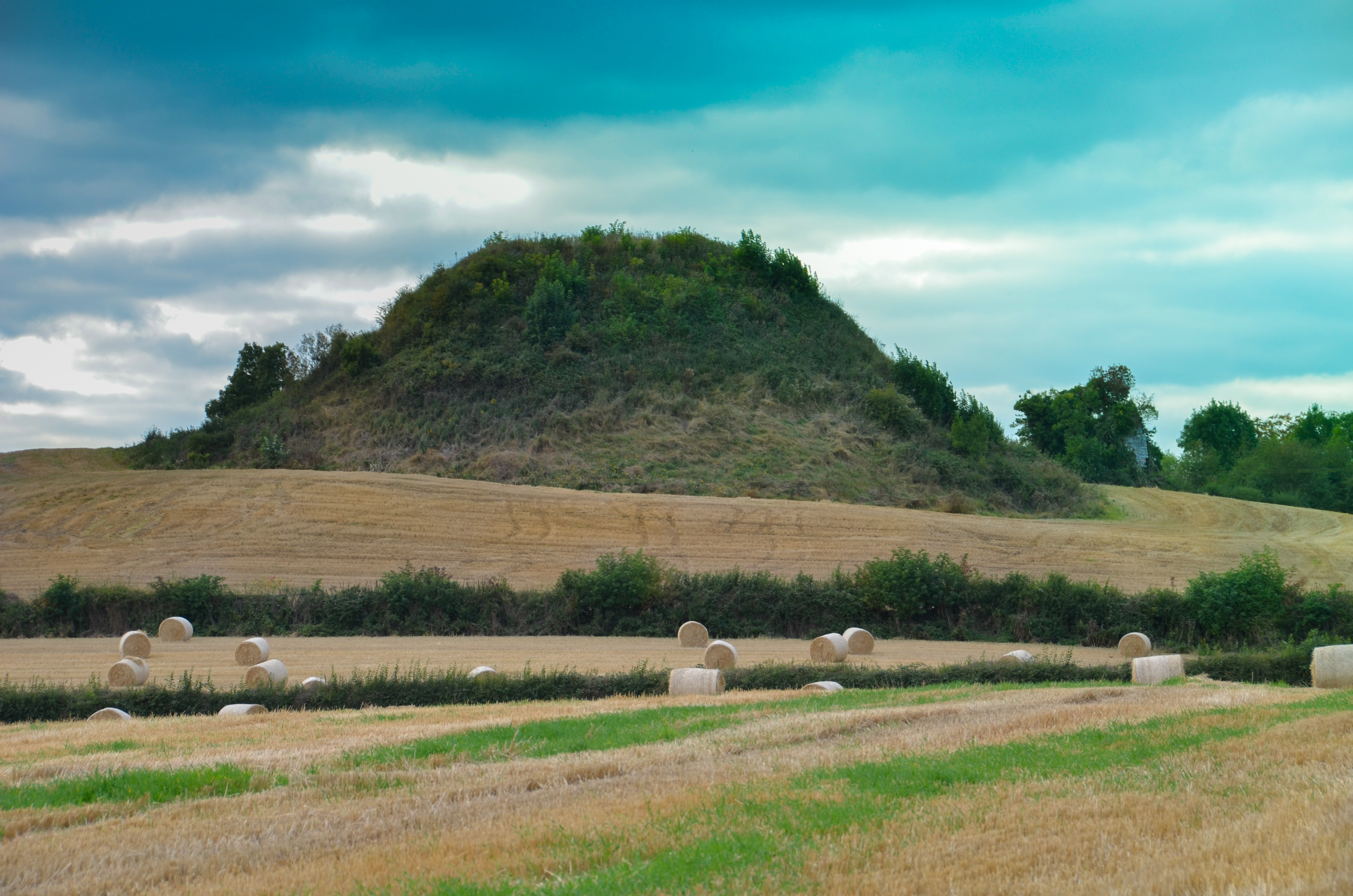
The motte at Knockgraffon

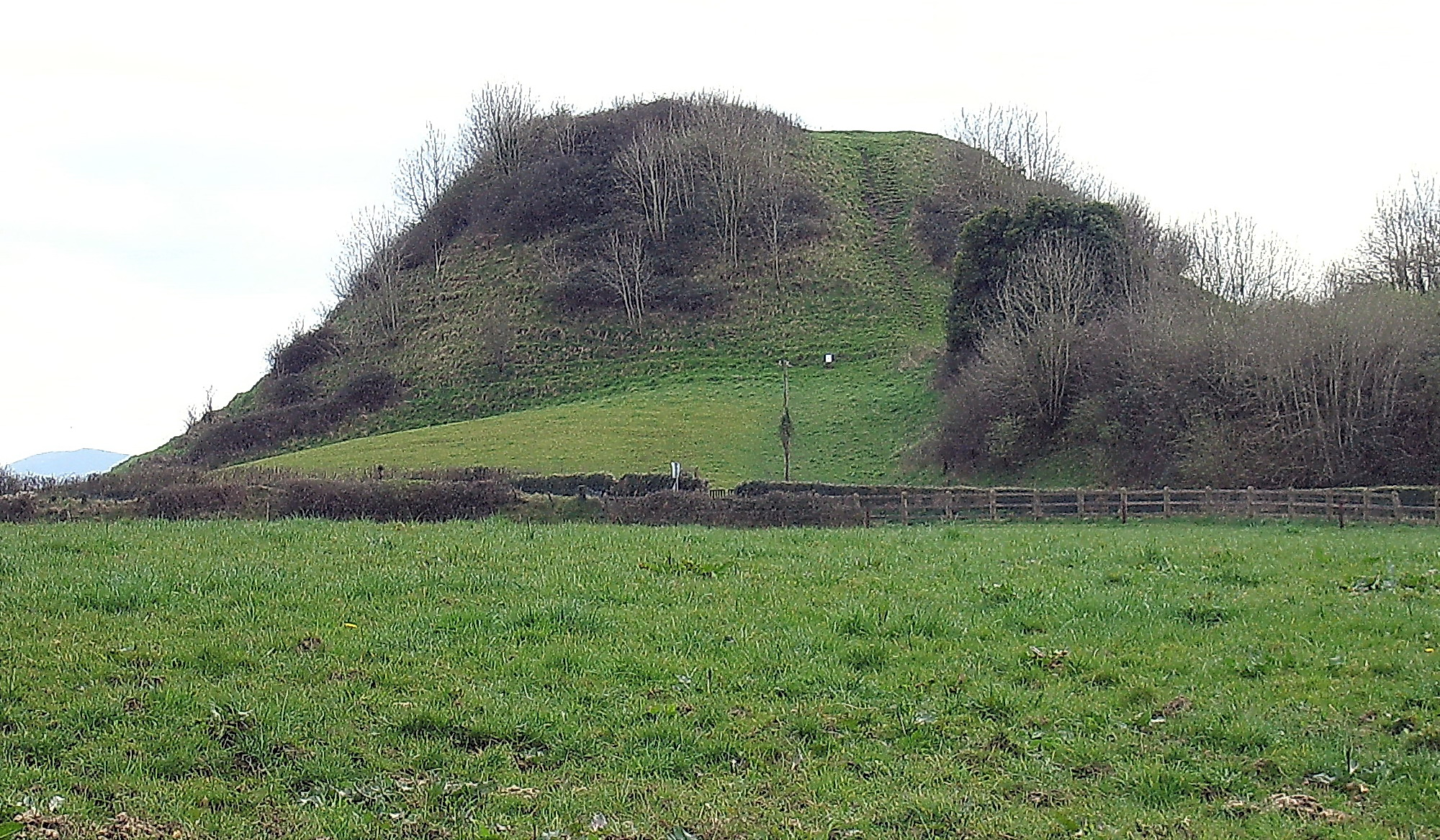
The motte at Knockgraffon

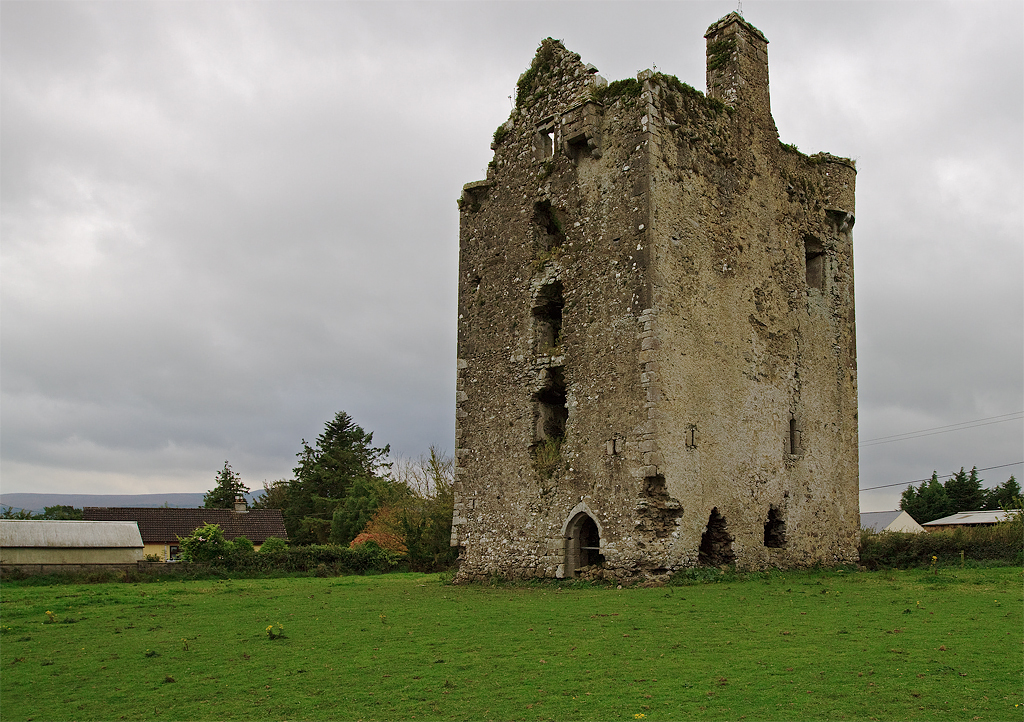
Knockgraffon Castle.

Knockgraffon (Irish: Cnoc Rafann or also Cnoc Rath Fionn meaning "Hill of the fort of Fionn") is a townland in the civil parish of the same name in County Tipperary, Ireland. The civil parish lies in the barony of Middle Third. The townland is around 5 km north of Cahir. It is also part of the ecclesiastical parish of New Inn & Knockgraffon in the Roman Catholic Archdiocese of Cashel and Emly. Interesting features include a fine motte, a church and a castle.

== History ==
While it was once a significant settlement in its own right, by the 18th century it had been abandoned. Around 1610, the Irish historian Geoffrey Keating was appointed Parish Priest of Knockgraffon. The motte was built by the English of Leinster beside the River Suir when they were on a raid against Donal Mor, Chief of the O'Sullivan clan, in 1192. It was given by the King to William de Braose, 3rd Lord of Bramber, but later taken from him and granted to Philip of Worcester. Nearby is a ruined 13th-century nave-and-chancel church with an east window inserted in the 15th century. A few hundred yards further away is a 16th-century tower built by the Butlers.

In the early 1300s, Knockgraffon was part of the inheritance of Joan de Bermingham, who married firstly Meiler, son of Peter de Bermingham, Lord of Athenry, and secondly the English judge Sir John de Fressingfield.

There is evidence that the site had important historical and ritual significance in the Kingdom of Munster. Claims are advanced that it was the sacred site for the coronation of the Kings of Munster. If true, then this would place Knockgraffon second only to Tara in archaeological significance. Fíngen mac Áedo Duib (died 618) was a King of Munster from the Eóganacht Chaisil branch of the Eóganachta. After his death, the throne of Cashel passed to his younger brother, Faílbe Flann mac Áedo Duib. His descendants were known as the Cenél Fíngin, survived today by the O'Sullivans and MacGillycuddys. On the death of Fíngen mac Áedo Duib, his wife Mór Muman re-married and eventually the throne of Munster passed to her sons by this second marriage, including Cathal Cú-cen-máthair. Following this dynastic change of fortune, the O’Sullivan clan returned to Knockgraffon where they enjoyed considerable wealth and power. The O’Sullivan lands originally included Clonmel, Cahir, Carrick-on-Suir and Cashel. In Heerin’s topography, written in 1400, is found the verse:

O’Sullivan, who delights not in violence

Rules over the extensive Eoghanacht of Munster;
About Knockgraffon broad lands he obtained,

Won by his victorious arms, in conflicts and battles.

Following the Anglo-Norman invasion of Ireland in 1169, the O’Sullivan chiefs were recognized as princes of the Eóganachta nation who enjoyed considerable independence from the over-lord of Munster, the MacCarthy Mor. In 1192, the O’Sullivan clan suffered a devastating defeat and was forced to surrender its territory to the Norman invaders. The entire tribe immigrated west to the stark mountains of Cork and Kerry. Adding insult to injury, the Normans constructed a large earthen mound surrounded by a wooden fence right on the sacred hill of Rath Fionn. Eventually, they also built a small stone castle near the motte. Donal Mor, the chief of the O’Sullivan clan when Knockgraffon was lost, was later assassinated by the MacCarthy Mor in 1214 to quell a movement among the Eoghanacht nation to restore the throne of Munster to the descendants of Fíngen.

Other towns in the area include New Inn, County Tipperary.

Marian Tobin, one of the women who ran a safe house in Ireland during the Irish War of Independence and was known particularly for sheltering Dan Breen and Seán Treacy after the Soloheadbeg ambush in 1919, was born in Knockgraffon.
