= Margaret Tobin =

Margaret Tobin may refer to:

- Birth name of Margaret Brown (1867-1932), American socialite, philanthropist, and survivor of RMS Titanic
- Margaret Julia Tobin (1952–2002), psychiatrist and medical administrator in South Australia, murder victim
