= New Inn, County Tipperary =

New Inn Loch Ceann
- Village
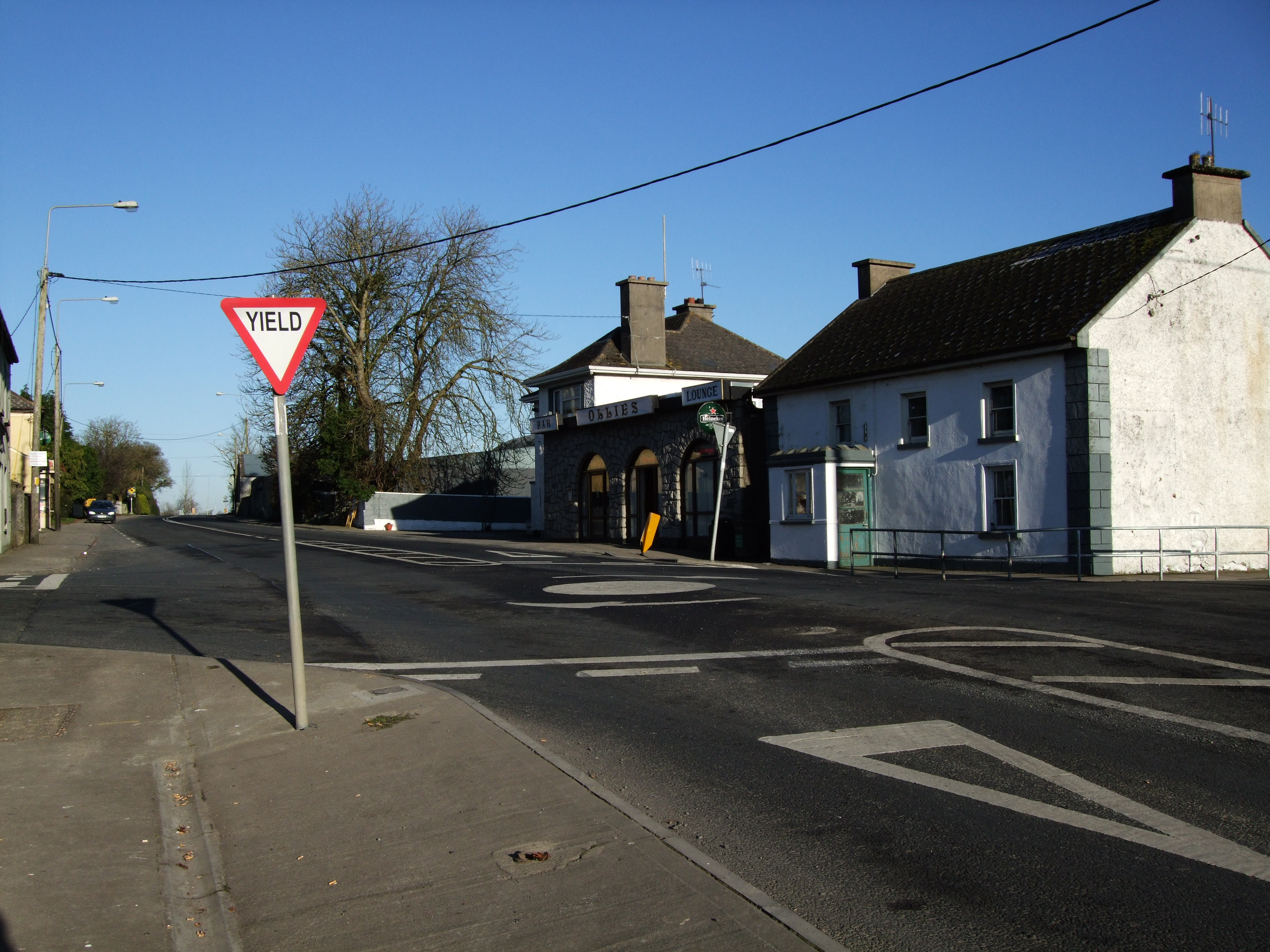
- The R639 (i.e. the former N8) through New Inn

- Location in Ireland
- Coordinates: 52°26′26.5″N 7°52′56.5″W
- Country: Ireland
- Province: Munster
- County: County Tipperary

New Inn or Newinn, historically Lough Kent (Irish: Loch Ceann), is a village in County Tipperary in Ireland. It is midway between the towns of Cahir and Cashel.

== Location and access ==
It is located in the Golden Vale midway between the market and tourist towns of Cahir and Cashel. Bypassed in October 2007 by the M8, the main road through the village is a section of the R639. Two other roads, the R687 to Clonmel and the L3121 road to Golden, begin at the centre of the village.

It is in the barony of Middle Third, and part of the parish of New Inn and Knockgraffon in the Roman Catholic Archdiocese of Cashel and Emly.

== Amenities and facilities ==
New Inn has two pubs, two schools, one shop, a convent and church, a Community Centre, a tennis club, and a GAA pitch, which is home to Rockwell Rovers GAA Club. To the south of the village is the Outrath Co-op, which serves the large agricultural hinterland of the village. Rockwell College, a private secondary school under the Spiritan Education Trust, is situated 3 km (1.9 mi) from the centre of the village.

== History ==
The village lies within the townland of Loughkent, and the village was formerly known by this name. It is derived from Irish Loch Ceann 'lake of the head'. Older anglicisations include Lochken and Loghkean. Another old name for the village was Graigkent (likely from Irish Gráig Ceann 'hamlet of the head'). The parish church, The Church of our Lady Queen, was built in 1832.

=== The Whiteboys ===
The area around present-day New Inn was a hotbed of agrarian unrest and Whiteboy activity in the late 1700s.

=== The road through New Inn ===
It is not known when the present settlement of New Inn was founded. It is not listed on either Herman Moll's 1714 map of Ireland, nor is it depicted in Taylor and Skinner's Maps of the Roads of Ireland, published in 1778. While New Inn does not appear to have existed in the 18th century, the road now known as the R639 between Cashel and Cahir clearly did. At that time the R639 was not the main Dublin to Cork route (it did not exist north of Cashel until 1739, nor south of Cahir to Fermoy until after 1811). It is probable that the present settlement developed after the turnpike road-building drive of the 18th century was substantially complete by the early 19th century, when Charles Bianconi ran regular coach services throughout the region from 1815, establishing several inns along popular routes in the process.

=== The Murder at Marlhill ===
On 22 November 1940, a local woman named Mary McCarthy (known as Moll Carthy) was murdered in a field at Marlhill. An unmarried mother of seven, McCarthy was shot in the face at close range. Her neighbour, a man named Harry Gleeson, who had discovered the body, was arrested, charged and convicted of her murder, and hanged in Dublin. The Murder at Marlhill, as the event has become known, continues to spark controversy both in the local community and historical circles, with many maintaining Gleeson's innocence. A book and two RTÉ television programmes have documented the event.

In March 2015, the Irish Justice Minister Frances Fitzgerald granted a pardon to Henry Gleeson and an apology for his hanging after a conviction that was "unsafe".

== Sport ==
The local GAA club is Rockwell Rovers.

=== New Inn Tennis Club ===
New Inn's association with tennis goes back to the 1890s when Lena Rice of Marlhill House, New Inn came to the fore in the national tennis championships. In 1889, she was narrowly defeated in the final of the singles in Fitzwilliam Square in Dublin. She won the mixed doubles that same year, and the following year, 1890, she achieved what no other Irish woman has achieved by winning the Wimbledon singles championship.

On 16 June 1991, the Lena Rice Trophy was presented to the club by Fr. Meehan on his own behalf and on behalf of David Joe O’ Neill. Each year the club invites all local clubs to play for the honour of winning this trophy.

An all-weather surface was installed on both courts in February 2009. This was made possible by extensive fundraising by club members over several years and by grant aid from Tipperary County Council and National Lottery funding.

== Knockgraffon ==
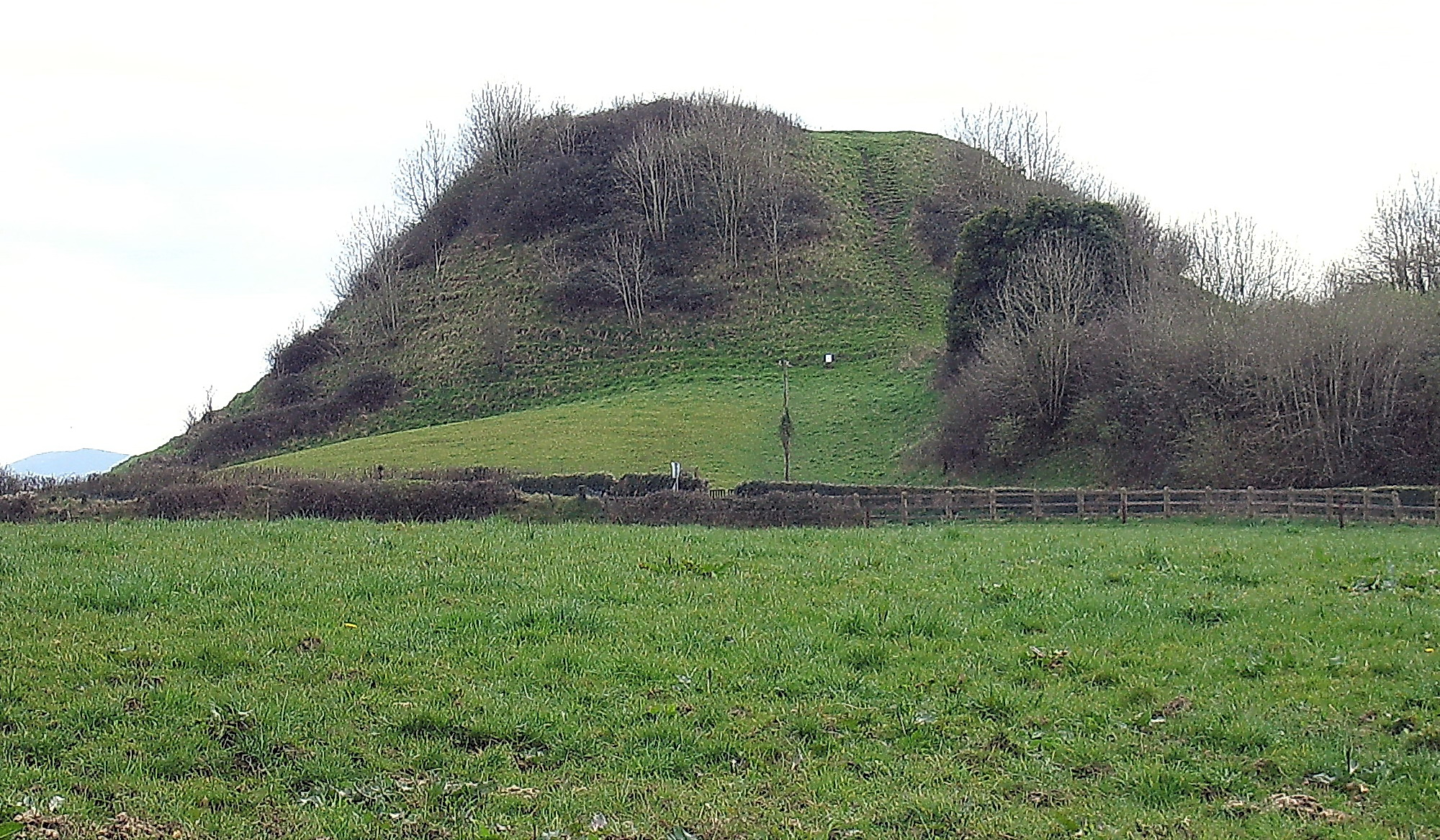
The Motte at Knockgraffon

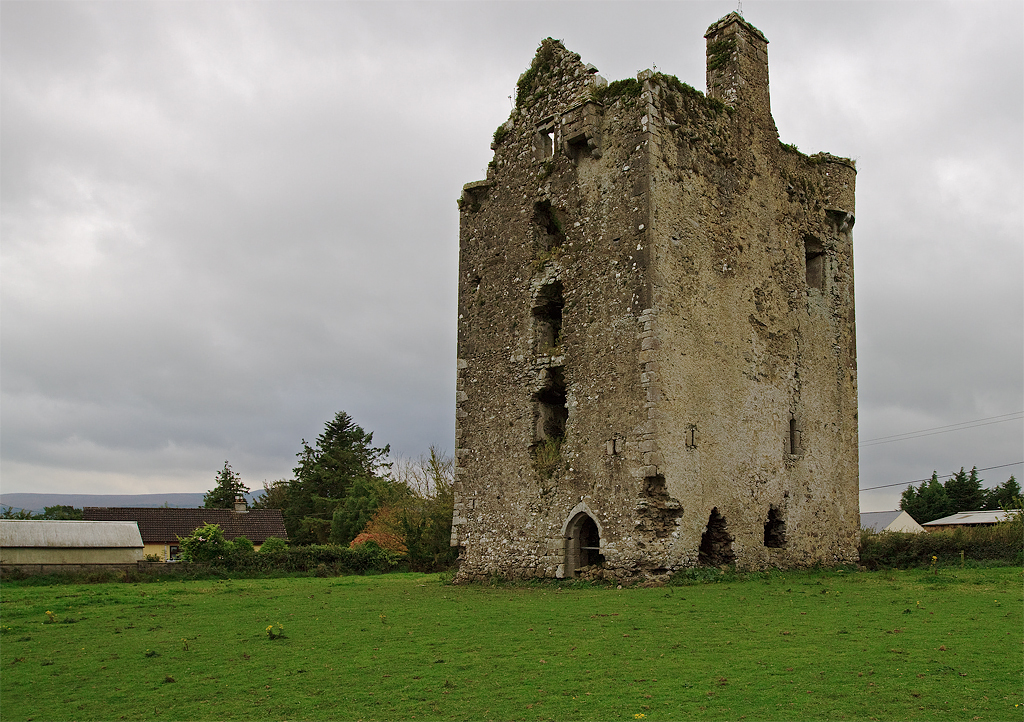
Knockgraffon Castle.

The parish of New Inn also includes Knockgraffon (Irish: Cnoc Rafann), a rural locality which is home to a ruined medieval church and graveyard. Knockgraffon was once a village in its own right, but the settlement was abandoned sometime in the 18th century. Around 1610, the Irish historian Geoffrey Keating was appointed Parish Priest of Knockgraffon. Interesting features include a fine Motte, a church and a castle. The motte was built by the English of Leinster beside the River Suir when they were on a raid against Donal Mor O'Brien, King of Thomond, in 1192. It was given by the King to William de Braose but later taken from him and granted to Philip of Worcester. Nearby is a ruined 13th-century nave-and-chancel church with an east window inserted in the 15th century. A few hundred yards further away is a 16th-century tower built by the Butlers.

Knockgraffon was the centre of the O'Sullivan clan's ancestral lands, until that family was displaced by the Normans in the early 13th century. In 1998, the Knockgraffon motte was purchased by an O'Sullivan (Gary Brian Sullivan of Statesboro, Georgia, US) from its Norman-Irish owner (Donal Keating of Cahir, Ireland). It is the first time that Knockgraffon has been back in O'Sullivan possession for nearly 800 years. Other townlands include: Ardneasa, Boytonrath, Chamberlainstown, Derryclooney, Garrandea, Garranlea, Lagganstown, Lough Kent, Masterstown, Marlhill, and Outrath.

== Notable people ==
- Canon Edmond Kelly (1874–1955), born in New Inn and later Parish Priest of Killenaule from 1934 to 1955.
- Lena Rice (1866–1907), born in Marlhill, New inn, was the only female tennis player from Ireland to win a Wimbledon Championships title.

== See also ==
- List of towns and villages in Ireland
