= Marian Tobin =

Woman involved in Irish War of Independence

- Tobin in 1920
- Born: Mary Ann Carew; 1873; Knockgraffon, Co. Tipperary
- Died: 1955 (aged 81–82); Limerick

Marian Tobin ran a safe house in Ireland during the Irish War of Independence and was known particularly for sheltering Seamus Robinson, Sean Hogan, Dan Breen and Seán Treacy after the Soloheadbeg ambush, the incident which sparked the war.

== Biography ==
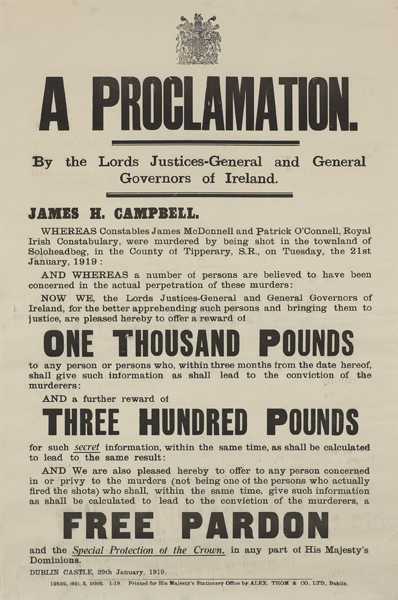
A proclamation offering a reward of 1000 pounds for information leading to the capture of those involved in the Soloheadbeg ambush

She was born Mary Ann Carew in 1873 in Knockgraffon, Co. Tipperary. Her mother was farmer Bridget Carew. Her father had already died by 1901. She became Marian Tobin when she married James Tobin, a farmer from Tincurry House in 1902. They had three children May, Eva and John. They were a republican household and used their home as Battalion headquarters for the first company of the 6th Battalion.

James Tobin was the Captain of the Volunteers and helped found Sinn Fein in Tipperary with Arthur Griffith.

Marian Tobin became a widow in 1918.

Seán Treacy, Seamus Robinson, Dan Breen and Seán Hogan arrived on her doorstep on 22 January 1919, after they and eight others had initiated the Soloheadbeg ambush, seizing Gelignite and killing two RUC police officers in the process. They had fled across the Galtees from Soloheadbeg, and had already been turned away from two houses on the way. They asked her for Sanctuary. She agreed and hid the men for four nights.

These men would become the most wanted men in Ireland and were labelled "The Big Four" by the British forces.

She continued to hide men, arms, documents and evidence, she would clean guns and deliver people and messages for the Volunteers, the Irish Republican Army. Her land was used to conduct drills. The IRA even experimented with explosives on her land, particularly Mud Bombs, which were used to destroy the roofs of British military barracks and RUC police stations, during raids to acquire more weapons for their organisation and the cause of Irish Inderpendence.

Her house was repeatedly raided by British forces but she was never found with anything that could be used against her.

In May 1921 the British forces arrived and destroyed her furniture and belongings and then blew up her house with explosives. Thirteen houses in Tipperary were chosen by the British to be destroyed as reprisal for the capture and execution of local District Police Inspector Gilbert Potter. Marians house, Tincurry, was the grandest and oldest of these houses, being pre Cromwellian.

Marian Tobin was never involved with the capture or plight of District Inspector Potter.

Her house was broken to pieces by the British Brigade, who then set bombs in the four fireplaces and "Blew the house to the four winds" The family watched from the lawn. Marian it is said, with the help of family and servants, dragged the piano onto the lawn and played Rebel songs during this destruction.

This illegal reprisal act was debated in the Houses of Parliament the following week (Hansard Military Operations Ireland June 1 1921)

Tincurry House was later rebuilt by the Tobin family, and now is a Private Home.

Many of the women involved in the War of Independence were not listed as members of Cumann na mBan but in a letter supporting her application for her pension, it was said of Marian Tobin that "whether or not you were officially a member of CnamB, you were de facto and de jure a member of the IRA."

In 1920, Tobin became Tipperary's first female county councillor. She held the position until 1925. Although entitled to a pension, Tobin did not request one until 1950 saying that while previously she had not needed help, she was now “sorely in need” of the money. The pension was granted in 1951.
