= Toby Buonagurio =

American artist

Toby Buonagurio is an American artist known for her "flamboyant" ceramics. She has won the Bronx Recognizes Its Own Award (BRIO) and the SUNY award.

== Professional work ==
Buonagurio has had her work in many exhibitions and has a permanent installation in the 42nd Street Times Square subway station. Titled "Times Square Times: 35 Times" it is made up of 35 separate pieces embedded in a glass brick wall. Buonagurio teaches art at the State University of New York at Stony Brook.

== Personal life ==
Buonagurio comes from a working-class background in New York City's borough of the Bronx. She continues to live there and is reported to take pride in her connection to the neighborhood. She is married to the painter Edgar Buonagurio.

== Awards ==
- 1992 BRIO award
- SUNY Research Foundation Research and Scholarship award
- 1998 BRIO award
