= Toby Lanzer =

UN official (born 1965)

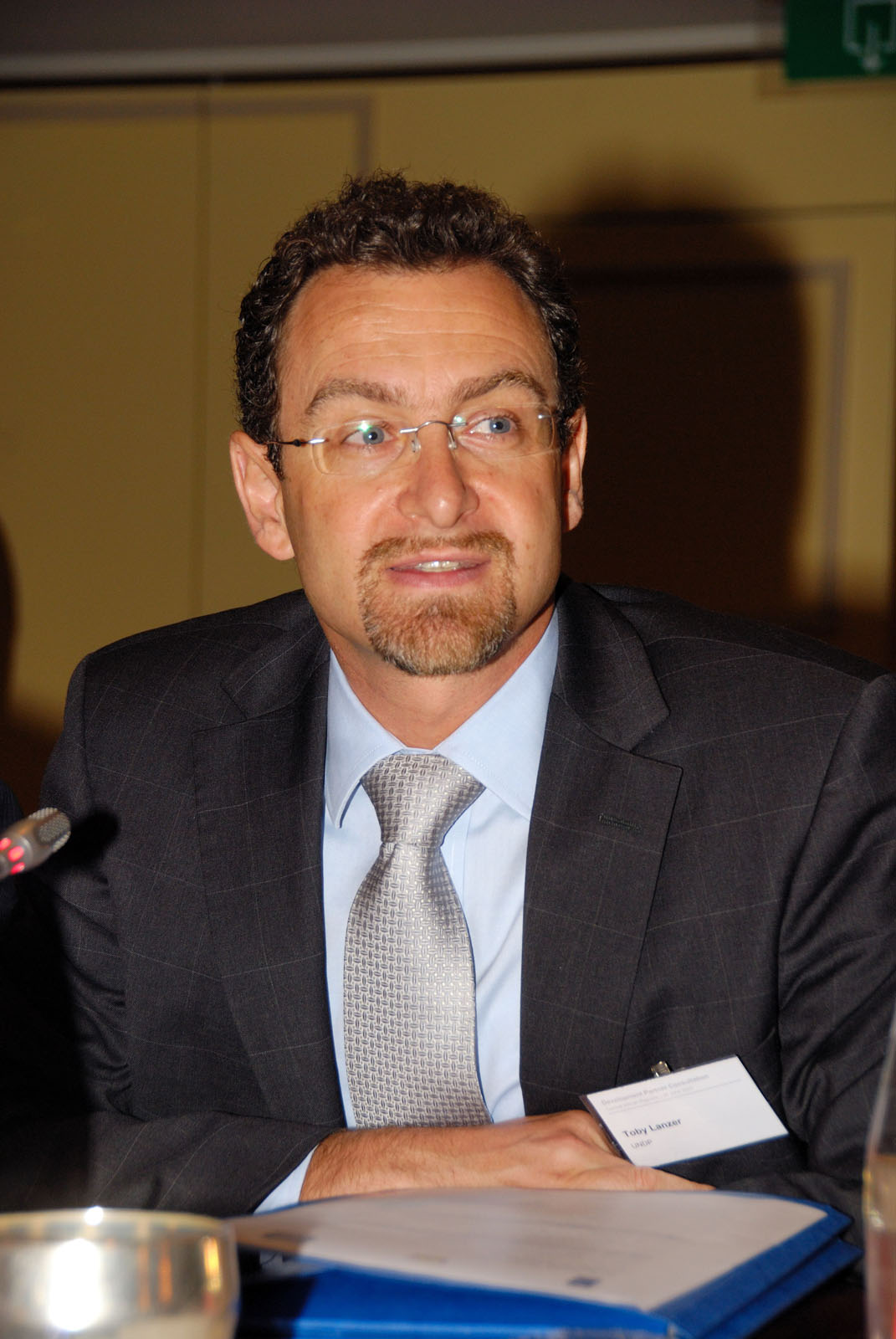
- Lanzer in 2007

Personal details
- Born: 1965 (age 60–61)
- Education: University of Oxford; University of New Hampshire; Columbia University

Toby Lanzer (born 1965), a national of the United Kingdom, is a former assistant secretary-general of the United Nations who recently served as Deputy Special Representative of the Secretary-General in the UN's political office in Afghanistan, UNAMA. Secretary-General António Guterres appointed Lanzer to this position in January 2017, before which he served the United Nations in various peacekeeping, humanitarian and development roles:

- Regional Humanitarian Coordinator for the Sahel.
- Deputy Special Representative of the Secretary-General in South Sudan.
- Peacekeeping Chief of Staff of the United Nations Integrated Mission in Timor-Leste (UNMIT).
- Humanitarian Coordinator for Darfur.
- United Nations Development Programme (UNDP) Resident Representative in the Central African Republic.

He has also worked for the United Nations at headquarters, as well as in Georgia (country) and the Russian Federation. Before joining the UN as a UK-sponsored Junior Professional Officer (JPO) in 1992, Lanzer worked for human rights organisations in Brazil and Chile.

He has been a regular contributor to journals, for example, published by the Overseas Development Institute (ODI) and the University of Oxford, and has spoken at numerous conferences and meetings held in institutions such as Chatham House. Lanzer retired from the UN in July 2020.

Lanzer speaks English, French, German, Russian, Portuguese and Spanish.

Educated at the University of Oxford, Columbia University and the University of New Hampshire, Lanzer holds a master's degree in international affairs, a post-graduate certificate in forced migration, and a bachelor's degree in history.
