= James Waterhouse (journalist) =

English journalist and former professional rugby player

James Waterhouse (born 1986) is an English journalist and former professional rugby player. He is currently serving as the BBC News correspondent in Paris and came to prominence as the corporation's Kyiv correspondent when Russia launched its full-scale invasion of Ukraine in 2022.

Before entering journalism Waterhouse played rugby union professionally between 2006 and 2011 for Rotheram Titans, Plymouth Albion and Esher.

He attended Aylesbury Grammar School from where he graduated in 2004.

== Journalism career ==
Waterhouse's move into journalism was prompted by the chair of Esher rugby club, the former BBC broadcaster John Inverdale, who encouraged him to pursue a degree in journalism. He studied broadcast journalism at London College of Communication. He then worked for Global Radio and Talksport before moving to BBC Essex.

He began as the BBC's Kyiv correspondent in 2022 just weeks before Russia's full-scale invasion of Ukraine and was in the capital to provide the first reports of Russian attacks. He reported from the frontline as part of the BBC team which won an award for International News Coverage from the Royal Television Society in 2023. The judges said "The winning entry combined vivid and brave frontline reporting with insightful coverage of the refugee problem and the politics driving the Ukraine conflict. It displayed strong, authoritative reporting from some of the UK's best known and most respected journalists - alongside some newer voices."

In October 2025 The Times described Waterhouse as "one of the BBC's biggest rising stars and is now a household name, whose reports have led BBC News at Ten countless times and who has won accolades far and wide for his on-screen unflappability and empathy". In an interview he described how reporting from Ukraine had led him to be diagnosed with post-traumatic stress disorder.
