= Toby Vintcent =

British writer and politician

- Born: 3 February 1962
- Occupations: Writer, politician, financier, soldier.
- Political party: Brexit Party (2019); Conservative (1990−2019)

Toby Vintcent is a British writer, politician, investment manager, and former soldier. He was previously the Chairman of the Conservative Party for the Greater London Area, and in 2019 was the Promoter of the Brexit Party.

== Career ==
Vintcent was a pupil at the Aylesbury Grammar School between 1975 and 1980. He subsequently joined the British Army and served as a commissioned officer with the 16th/5th The Queen's Royal Lancers during the Cold War for three years. He left the army to work in finance for a division of S.G. Warburg & Co. which became Mercury Asset Management and subsequently Merrill Lynch Investment Managers. He retired from this role at the age of 42.

=== Politics ===
Vintcent was chairman of the Hammersmith Conservative Association in 1994. He was the Conservative Party chairman for the Greater London Area by 1999. Vintcent worked on Jeffrey Archer's failed campaign to become Mayor of London in 1999, he was described as 'an old and loyal friend' of Lord Archer.

Vintcent volunteered to lead the logistics and administration for Sir Malcolm Rifkind's candidacy for the leadership of the Conservative Party in 2005, Rifkind withdrew before polling commenced. He stood unsuccessfully to be the vice-president of the Conservative Party Board in 2006, receiving endorsements from Rifkind, Anne Milton, Michael Ancram, Daniel Kawczynski, Richard Benyon and others; many noted his role in founding the Conservative Party's General Election Voluntary Agency and 64-seat call centre (GENEVA).

Vintcent promoted a Brexit Party leaflet campaign, advocating a no deal Brexit, during the 2019 European Parliament elections. He was listed on the party's main website as the Promoter ahead of the 2019 United Kingdom general election.

Vintcent was part of the Brexit Party's interviewing process for parliamentary candidates in 2019, which was criticised by one unsuccessful applicant as a "money-making scheme".

=== Author ===
His debut novel Driven, published in 2014, is a thriller set in the world of Formula One which was critically acclaimed in the F1 and mainstream press and shortlisted for the Cross British Sports Book Awards in 2015. His second novel, Crash, was published in July 2016 and reviewed by the International New York Times who described it as "Reminiscent of the best Robert Ludlum-like thrillers". The Ringmaster, his third Formula 1 thriller, was published in July 2018 and was shortlisted for the Telegraph British Sports Book Awards in the General Outstanding Sports Writing of the Year Category.

Year	Title	Awards	Category	Result
2015	Driven	Cross British Sports Book Awards	Best New Writer	Nominated
2019	The Ringmaster	The Telegraph Sports Book Awards	General Outstanding Sports Writing Award	Nominated

=== Equestrian Sport ===
He rode for Great Britain as a junior in the late 1970s, competing in Three-Day Eventing. He continued to be involved in equestrian sport as a team manager for youth teams and attended the Sydney Olympic Games 2000 as the Deputy Team Manager of the British Equestrian Contingent. Vintcent was a director of the British Equestrian Federation, working on the preparation of Team GBs equestrian team until November 2011. He is the director of Horseworld Ltd., an equestrian broadcasting and events company; he won a legal action at the Royal Courts of Justice in 2012 against an employee who had used inside information to poach broadcast rights for her own company.

== Personal life ==
Vintcent lives in Oxfordshire and is married to Anne-Marie Taylor, the former international Three-Day Event rider. They have a son.
