= Toby Knobel Fluek =

American artist

Toby Fluek
- Born: Toby Knobel; 20 February 1926; Czernica, Poland
- Died: 3 June 2011 (aged 85); West Orange, New Jersey, U.S.
- Spouse: Max Fluek (m. 1945; died 1989)

Toby Fluek (née Knobel; 20 February 1926 – 3 June 2011) was a Jewish artist born in Poland who survived the Holocaust by avoiding capture by the Nazis before emigrating to the United States after World War II. After settling in New York in 1949, Fluek began her career as an artist, painting and illustrating her memories of life before, during, and after the Nazi invasion. She published two books and is featured in two films, one of which she is the subject of. After her death in 2011, Fluek's daughter, Lillian Fluek Finkler, donated her mother's body of work—over 500 drawings, paintings, photographs, and ephemera—to the Florida Holocaust Museum in St. Petersburg, Florida where it is held as part of the museum's permanent collection.

== Early life ==
Fluek was born Toby Knobel in Czernica, Poland on 20 February 1926. She was the youngest of four children in an Orthodox Jewish family. Her father was a potato and wheat farmer and her family was one of ten Jewish families in a village of about two hundred and fifty families of Polish and Ukrainian heritage. Their home and life were modest—Fluek describes their bathing ritual: "One towel was used by six." As a child, Fluek was the only Jewish student in her school and was teased by her classmates as she did not participate in Catholic prayers and could not write while attending school on the Jewish Sabbath (school was six days a week with only Sunday off from class).

In the summer of 1941, almost two years after the Russian occupation of Poland, Nazis marched into the village. Fluek and her siblings were briefly jailed for her father's inability to comply with Nazi demands for wheat crops from the Jewish farmers. In the fall of 1942 the family was relocated to the Jewish ghetto in the nearby city of Brody. Fluek and her older sister, Surcie, fled the ghetto under cover of darkness and returned to Czernica, where they survived by hiding in the woods and with the help of their former neighbors. Surcie returned to the ghetto to encourage her parents to flee and her mother left with her. Fluek's other sister, Lajcie, was sick with typhoid, her older brother Aron, was taken to a work camp, while her father chose to remain in the ghetto in hiding. Fluek and her mother were the only two to survive the Holocaust as the ghetto hospital where Lajcie was being treated was burned with the patients still inside, Aron ran from his work camp and was caught by Nazi soldiers, Fluek's father was caught by soldiers after the ghetto was liquidated when he came out of hiding in search of water and food and was executed on the spot, and Surcie was separated from Fluek and her mother and was not heard from again.

After the war, Fluek and her mother were sent to multiple displaced persons (DP) camps, eventually making their way to Bad Wörishofen where Fluek's mother was treated in the DP hospital while the pair waited to immigrate to the United States. Fluek met and married her husband, Abraham, in the DP camp before relocating to the Bronx, New York, in December 1949. A year later her daughter, Lillian, was born.

== Becoming an Artist ==
Despite having artistic inclinations as a child, Fluek did not take an art class until she was in her 30s. Her body of work includes paintings, charcoals, sketches, and drawings that largely draw on her memories of her childhood, before the start of World War II, including religious celebrations, but also include portraits of relatives, still lifes, landscapes, and design motifs. Fluek published two memoirs: Memories of My Life in a Polish Village (Alfred A. Knopf, New York, 1990, ISBN 978-0394586175), and Passover As I Remember It (Alfred A. Knopf, 1994, ISBN 978-0679838760). Both books are written and illustrated by Fluek, with her daughter, Lillian Fluek Finkler, listed as a contributing author on the latter. Fluek's art was featured in the 1981 documentary film, Image Before My Eyes, and is the subject of the 2008 film, Toby’s Sunshine: The Life and Art of Holocaust Survivor Toby Knobel Fluek, produced by Dr. Rakhmiel Peltz.

Fluek created much of her art from memory but used photographs of models as aids. The photographs, including many of herself and some from a trip to Poland to document rural village life, are contained in the artist's personal archive and now reside at the Florida Holocaust Museum in their permanent collection.

== Death and Donation to the Florida Holocaust Museum ==
Fluek died on June 3, 2011, at the age of 85, in West Orange, New Jersey. She was predeceased by her husband, leaving her body of work to her daughter, Lillian Fluek Finkler. Finkler searched for a museum to house her mother's art before deciding on the Florida Holocaust Museum, which had years earlier showcased Fluek's art in a temporary exhibition. Finkler describes her decision to donate the collection to the Museum: "I have donated my mother's collection to The Florida Holocaust Museum so that her story would be kept alive, even though she is no longer with us. I am excited that her artwork will be exhibited and shared by The Florida Holocaust Museum in their educational outreach as well as digitally and in museum exhibits. It is important that children, adults, museums and researchers all have access to this unique visual memory of my mother's world. She would have been pleased and honored that her work is being made available to current and future generations." The Florida Holocaust Museum received the donation in 2018 and has begun the work of processing the collection of over 500 pieces of art, documents, and ephemera into its permanent collection, though a date for exhibition has not been set.
