= Middle Third (County Tipperary barony) =

Barony in County Tipperary, Ireland

Middle Third (Irish: An Trian Meánach; also spelled Middlethird) is a barony in County Tipperary, Ireland. This geographical unit of land is one of 12 baronies in County Tipperary. Its chief town is Cashel. The barony lies between Eliogarty to the north (whose chief town is Thurles), Iffa and Offa East to the south (whose chief town is Clonmel), Clanwilliam to the west (whose chief town is Tipperary) and Slievardagh to the east (whose chief town is Mullinahone). It is currently administered by Tipperary County Council.

== Legal context ==
Baronies were created after the Norman invasion of Ireland as divisions of counties and were used the administration of justice and the raising of revenue. While baronies continue to be officially defined units, they have been administratively obsolete since 1898. However, they continue to be used in land registration and in specification, such as in planning permissions. In many cases, a barony corresponds to an earlier Gaelic túath which had submitted to the Crown.

== History ==
The history of the barony is also the history of the Kingdom of Munster which had Cashel for its capital. Later, the kingdom would be divided into northern and southern statelets.

=== Dynasts of Mumhan ===
The Éoganacht were a federation of tribes claiming a common lineage and spread throughout Munster. They were noted as kings of Munster from an early period until the rise of the Dal gCais in the 10th century. The main sub-tribes in the region of the barony were:

- Eóghanacht Chaisil (Cashel). Septs included O'Callaghan, MacCarthy, MacGillycuddy, MacAuliffe, O'Sullivan.
- Éoganacht Beag Chaisil (Eoganacht Caille na Manach, in the barony of Kilnamanagh)
- Éoganacht Mhór Muman (about Knockgraffon, in the barony of Middle Third)
- Eóghanacht Airthir Chliach (Tipperary town district)
- Eóghanacht Durluis (in or near Thurles, in the barony of Eliogarty)

Dal gCais dynasty. The High King of Ireland, Brian Boru, fortified Cashel in 990. Murtagh O'Brien, King of Cashel, in presence of the chiefs and clergy, made a grant in 1101 of the "Rock" with the territory around it to O'Dunan, "noble bishop and chief senior of Munster". In 1127 Cormac III of Munster, King of Desmond, erected close to his palace on the "Rock" a church, now known as Cormac's Chapel, which was consecrated in 1134. By the Synod of Kells, 1152, Cashel became an archiepiscopal see. There are frequent references to "Tuadh Mumhan" in the Irish Annals beginning in the latter 11th century, but as a separate entity representing all of northern Munster an entry for the year 1118 seems to mark a milestone event. In that year, a treaty at Gleann Maidhir (Glanmire) divided the Kingdom of Munster into northern (Tuadh Mumhan) and southern (Des Mumhan) halves, a division apparently running near the border of modern counties Limerick and Cork. The entry in the Annals for 1118 reads, " A hosting by Toirdhealbhach Ua Conchobhair, king of Connacht, and by Murchadh O Maelsechlainn, king of Temhair, along with him, and by Aed O'Ruairc, into Mumha, as far as Glenn-Maghair; and he gave Des-Mumha to Mac Carthaigh, and Tuadh-Mumha to the sons of Diarmaid Ua Briain, and carried off the hostages of each."

=== Lordship of Ireland ===
With this 12th-century division of Munster into two parts, Thomond included the area about the diocese of Killaloe, and additionally encompassed the traditional territories of Úi Fidgeinti, Uí Chonaill Gabra, Eóghanacht Áine, Éile, Corco Mruadh, the tribes of Uaithne (later held by the Síl Cennétich, and much of Eóghanacht Caisel and Ciarraige Luachra.

By the early 13th century, through the encroachment of the Anglo-Norman Butler family and others into eastern Thomond (north Tipperary, east Limerick and south Offaly), part of which came to be known as Ormond or East Munster, the kingdom of Thomond was greatly reduced.

=== Diocesan history ===
Various members of the Desmond and Ormond families became archbishops in the succeeding years up to the English Reformation. After a vacancy of six years Maurice FitzGibbon (1567–1578) a Cistercian abbot who belonged to the royal Desmond family, was promoted to the archbishopric by pope Pius V, but James MacCaghwell was put forward by Elizabeth I of England. Thus began the Anglican religion at Cashel. When the Penal Laws were sufficiently relaxed, the Roman Catholic archbishops returned openly to the see, but changed their residence and cathedra to Thurles.

=== Modern times ===
When County Tipperary was split into North and South Ridings in 1836, Middle Third was allocated to the south riding. However, the neighbouring barony of Kilnamanagh was split into Upper and Lower half-baronies, being allocated to the north and south ridings respectively.

== Towns, villages and townlands of the barony ==
- Cashel
- Rosegreen
- Fethard
- New Inn

=== Civil parishes of the barony ===
This table lists an historical geographical sub-division of the barony known as the civil parish (not to be confused with an Ecclesiastical parish).

Name in Irish	Name in English
Ard Máil	Ardmayle
Baile an Ghraeigh	Graystown
Baile an Ráiligh	Railstown
Baile an tSeánaigh	St. Johnstown
Baile Bhriodúnach	Peppardstown
Baile na Madraí	Dogstown
Baile na Móna	Mora
Baile Uí Shíocháin	Ballysheehan
Bricín	Brickendown
Carraig Phádraig	St. Patricksrock
An Chathair Dhearg	Redcity
Cill Bhrácha	Kilbragh
Cill Cholmáin	Colman
Cill Chonaill	Kilconnell
Cill Teimhneáin	Kiltinan
Cillín an Stiabhnaigh	Killeenasteena
An Cluainín	Cloneen
Cnoc Rafann	Knockgraffon
An Chuailleach	Cooleagh
Cúil Mhondraí	Coolmundry
Daingean Deargáin	Dangandargan
Domhnach Mór	Donaghmore
Drongán	Drangan
Reilig Mhuire agus Áth Iseal	Relickmurry and Athassel
Fiodh Ard	Fethard
Gael	Gaile
Gráinseach an Bhairéadaigh	Barrettsgrange
Gráinseach Eoin Baiste	Baptistgrange
Maigh Gabhra	Magowry
Maigh gCorbáin	Magorban
An Mhainistir Liath	Horeabbey
Mainistir na Croiche	Holycross
Oireadh	Erry
Paróiste Eoin Baiste	St. John baptist
Ráth an Bhaightiúnaigh	Boytonrath
Ráth Cuala	Rathcool
Tulaigh Mheáin	Tullamain
Uachtar Rátha	Outeragh

Note: while the civil parish of Holycross straddles two baronies (Eliogarty and this baraony), the village itself and the abbey are entirely located in Eliogarty.

== See also ==
- List of civil parishes of South Tipperary
