= Paul E. Tobin Jr. =

Former United States Navy admiral

Paul Edward Tobin Jr.
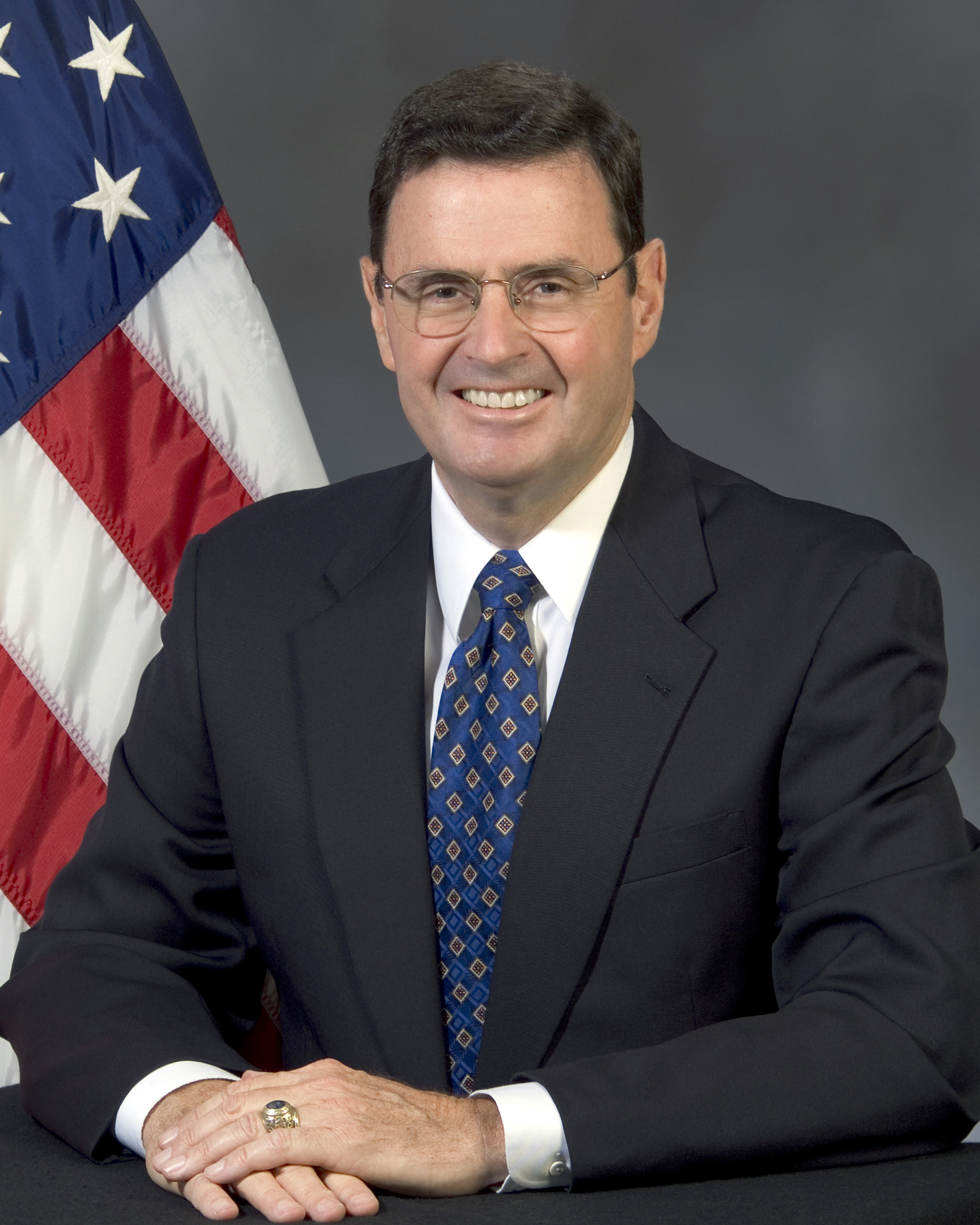
- Paul Tobin in 2005
- Military career
- Allegiance: United States of America
- Branch: United States Navy
- Service years: 1963–98
- Rank: Rear Admiral
- Awards: Distinguished Service Medal; Legion of Merit; Bronze Star

Paul Edward Tobin Jr. (born c. 1940) is a retired rear admiral of the United States Navy. He served as Oceanographer of the Navy from 1996 to 1998 and Director of Naval History from 2005 to 2008.

== Early life ==
Paul Tobin attended Lawrenceville School and graduated from the United States Naval Academy in 1963. Rear Admiral Tobin is married to Lynne Carter Tobin from Shaker Heights, Ohio, and they have two daughters.

== Naval career ==
Following graduation from the Naval Academy, Tobin reported to USS Towers (DDG-9) where he served as First Lieutenant and Main Propulsion assistant. After graduating with distinction from the Naval Destroyer School in 1966, he was assigned as Engineer Officer in USS Davis (DD-937), where he was awarded a Bronze Star for operations associated with the salvage of the USS Liberty (AGTR-5) after the ship sustained heavy damage in the 1967 Six-Day War due to an attack by Israel.

In 1968, he commenced postgraduate studies at the Naval Postgraduate School, which culminated in a Master of Science degree in computer systems management. In 1970, he joined the staff of Naval Destroyer School in Newport, Rhode Island, as head of the Technical Training Branch and as an engineering instructor in the Department Head and Prospective Commanding Officer and Prospective Executive Officer Departments.

Tobin reported as aide and flag secretary to the commander, Naval Forces Vietnam, in 1971. He returned to sea duty in 1973 as executive officer in USS Koelsch (FF-1049). Upon completing this tour, he reported as aide and flag lieutenant to the president of the Naval War College and subsequently graduated with distinction from the Naval Command and Staff course. In 1976, he reported to the Office of the Chief of Naval Operations and served in the Systems Analysis Division (OP-96)

In 1979, he assumed command of USS Tattnall (DDG-19), where he completed two Indian Ocean and Persian Gulf deployments. In 1981, he reported as chief engineer in USS Forrestal (CV-59), where he served for two years and participated in the 1981 Gulf of Sidra operations, two Mediterranean deployments and the initial phase of the Carrier Service Life Extension Program. In 1984, he graduated with distinction from the Industrial College of the Armed Forces in Washington, D.C.

In September 1984, he assumed command of USS Fox (CG-33) in San Diego, California. During this tour he completed a deployment to the Western Pacific Ocean and Indian Ocean. He assumed command of the Surface Warfare Officers School Command, Newport, Rhode Island, in July 1986. In October 1988, he assumed duties as Director, Department of the Navy Information Resources Management, and Director, Information Management Support Division (OP-945). He also served as Director, Naval Communication/Information Systems.

In August 1990, he assumed command of Naval Surface Group, Western Pacific, Task Force 73, and Task Force 75. In this capacity he oversaw the reorganization of naval surface forces in the Western Pacific. He then assumed the duties as Assistant Chief of Naval Personnel, Personal Readiness and Community Support (Pers-6) in September 1992. In June 1994, Rear Admiral Tobin assumed his duties as Vice Chief of Naval Education and Training. His final assignment was Oceanographer of the Navy (1996–1998).

== Post active-duty career ==
After retiring from active duty in 1998, Rear Admiral Tobin became the Executive Director of the Educational Foundation of the Armed Forces Communications Electronics Association (AFCEA) in Fairfax, Virginia. On 25 July 2005, he became the eleventh Director of Naval History and Director, Naval Historical Center.

In 2002, after his retirement, Admiral Tobin reviewed A. Jay Cristol's book, The Liberty Incident: The 1967 Israeli Attack on the U.S. Spy Ship, for the US Naval Institute journal Proceedings. In that review, Tobin wrote: “To have mistaken the ship for an Egyptian freighter would reflect poorly on their intelligence, and Israeli intelligence was rated as one of the world’s best. Any form of electronic warfare sweep certainly would have identified the Liberty’s SPS-10 surface search radar. I also believe strongly that no responsible young military professional would have attacked a virtually defenseless ship repeatedly without some strong guidance from a much higher authority. Any officer competent enough to fly a jet aircraft or command a patrol boat would have been able to identify this unique U.S. ship, and would have been repulsed by the idea of attacking a lightly armed ship.”

== Decorations and awards ==
Rear Admiral Tobin’s personal Awards include: Two Distinguished Service Medals, four Legion of Merit medals, the Bronze Star, the Meritorious Service Medal, and three Navy Commendation Medals.

- Navy Distinguished Service Medal with one Gold Star
- Legion of Merit with three Gold Stars
- Bronze Star
- Meritorious Service Medal
- Navy and Marine Corps Commendation Medal with two Gold Stars
