= Cantwell =

Cantwell or Cantwells may refer to:

== Places ==
- Cantwell, Alaska, a US census-designated place
- Cantwell, West Virginia
- Cantwell's Court, a townland in County Kilkenny, Ireland
- Cantwells Run, a stream in Ohio

== Other uses ==
- Cantwell (surname), people with the surname Cantwell
- Cantwell Fada (also known as the Long Man), an effigy of a knight on display in the ruins of a 14th-century church in Kilfane, near Thomastown in County Kilkenny, Ireland
- Cantwell v. Connecticut, a US Supreme Court case
