= Cantwell's Castle =

Tower house in County Kilkenny, Ireland

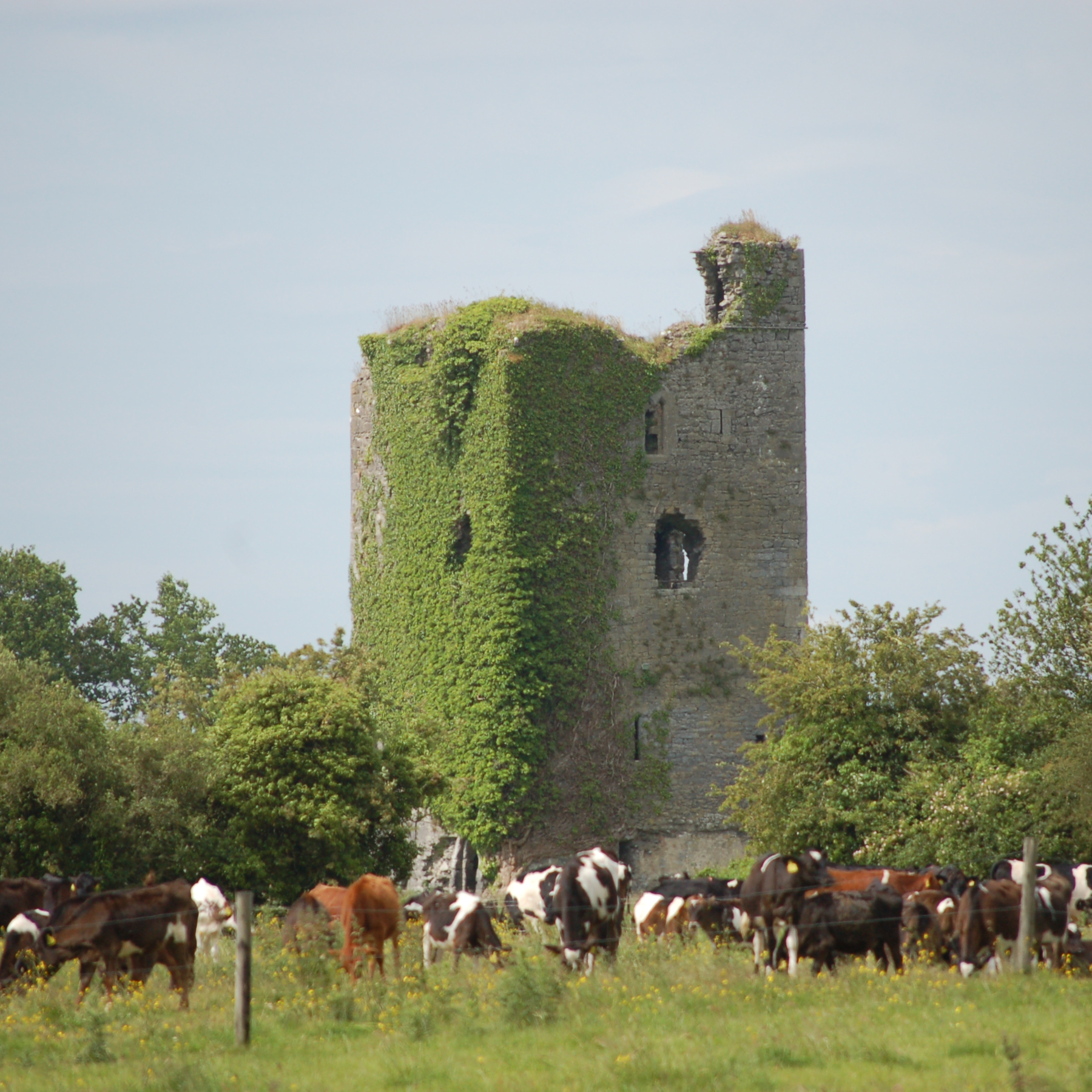

- Location within Ireland
- 52.68247°N 7.19508°W
- Type: tower house
- Location: Sandfordscourt, County Kilkenny, Ireland
- Nearest city: Kilkenny

History
- Founder: Cantwell family
- Original use: castle

Site notes
- Area: barony of Gowran
- Owner: Cantwell family

Cantwell's Castle is a tower house located in the townland of Sandfortscourt in County Kilkenny, Ireland. It served as the main residence for the head of the Cantwell family, While debated of who owned it in its final days the facts point to the Cantwell Family. Before a siege of the Cantwell castle from Oliver Cromwell's army which led to Cromwell's army being forced away with the Cantwells taking control even though two of the three castles were significantly damaged.

== Location ==
Cantwell's Castle is situated in the southern part of the townland of Sandfordscourt, formerly known as Cantwellscourt, approximately 7.5 km from Kilkenny City. The closest tower houses to Cantwell's Castle are Ballyfoyle Castle in Ballyfoyle, in the medieval period in possession of the Purcell family, and Clara Castle, formerly a Shortall castle.

== History ==
The Cantwells arrived in Ireland with Strongbow, the first one mentioned in 1177 was Hugh de Cantwelle. They were possibly from Suffolk, very likely Kentwell Hall. At the time, surnames as such did not exist, so that spelling variations of "Cantwell" also include "Conteville", with "Cantuell" being the oldest form.

Once settled in Ireland, they held lands in the parish of Rathcoole (which Sandfordscourt belongs to), Cloghscregg (northeast of Thomastown, County Kilkenny), Stroan (Kilfane near Thomastown), but also in Tipperary. There are still tower-houses associated with the Cantwells in Kilfane (see Cantwell Fada), Cloghscregg, Mellisson (Tipperary) and in Moycarky (Tipperary) with an impressively high wall adjacent to the castle.

Cantwell coat of arms

In 1381, then called Cantwellscourt is described as "with a good castle in repair and a water mill". Both are still shown on the Down Survey map, but there are no longer any traces of the mill. The Down Survey shows a second castle north of the ruins of the tower house which was known as Cantwell's Court. Between the two locations, cropmarks still indicate a settlement and the fields are still known as the "Castle Field", "Court Field" and "Near Court Field" (see illustration to the left).

A townland to the northwest of Sandfordscourt was named "Cantwellsgarron" on the Down Survey map, but has also been renamed into "Grove or Cramersgrove" (Irish Garrán or Garrán Chraiméir, sometimes falsely Creamersgrove) after Tobias Cramer, Cromwellian grantee.

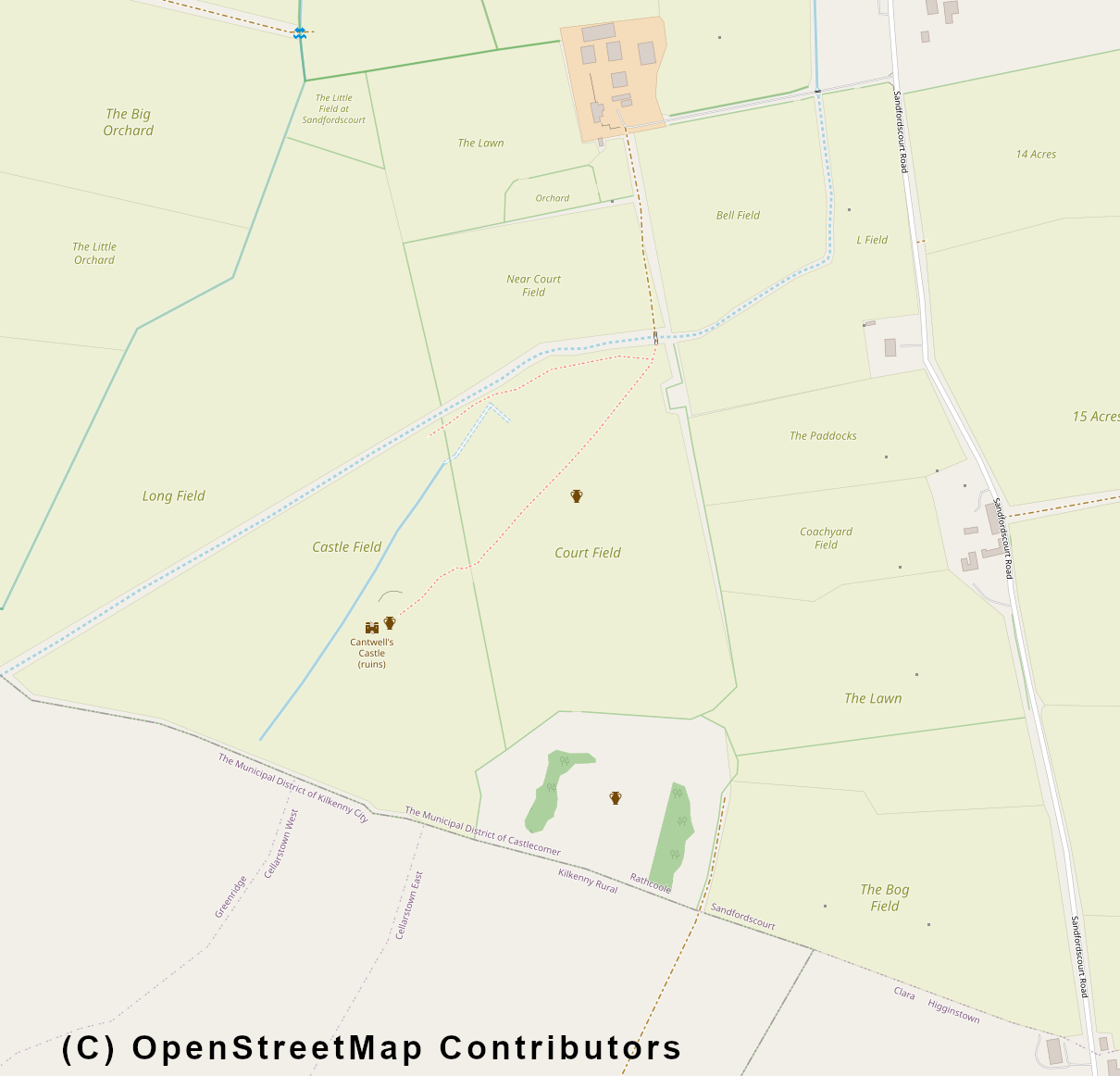
Fieldnames in Sandfordscourt

At the time of the Confederation of Kilkenny, John Cantwell who was Provost Marshal of the Confederates, is named as the owner. For his involvement against Cromwell, he was transplanted to Connaght with his mother and other relations.

The castle was used as a garrison by English, Welsh, and Scottish officers in 1649 who sent some of their men to negotiate with Cromwell who was approaching Kilkenny to exchange the castle against their retreat to leave Ireland. He accepted their terms.

The Down Survey names John Cantwell Sn. as the owner.

The property went into the hands of English man Charles Sandford, who renamed the townland after himself. He died in 1701, is buried in St. Canice's Cathedral and was succeeded by his son Thomas Sandford who was mayor of Kilkenny in 1723.

After the Sandford family went extinct, the land was taken over by Thomas Cahill who died in 1810.

At the time of the Griffith Valuation, the land was owned by Mrs. Ellen Cahill.

Nothing remains in situ of the (presumably) manor house Cantwell's Court apart from a cobble-stoned courtyard discovered by the current owner. It is still shown on the earliest versions of the Ordnance Survey maps. Its stones are thought to have been used by the earlier owner Thomas Cahill to build a more modern house.

== Building ==
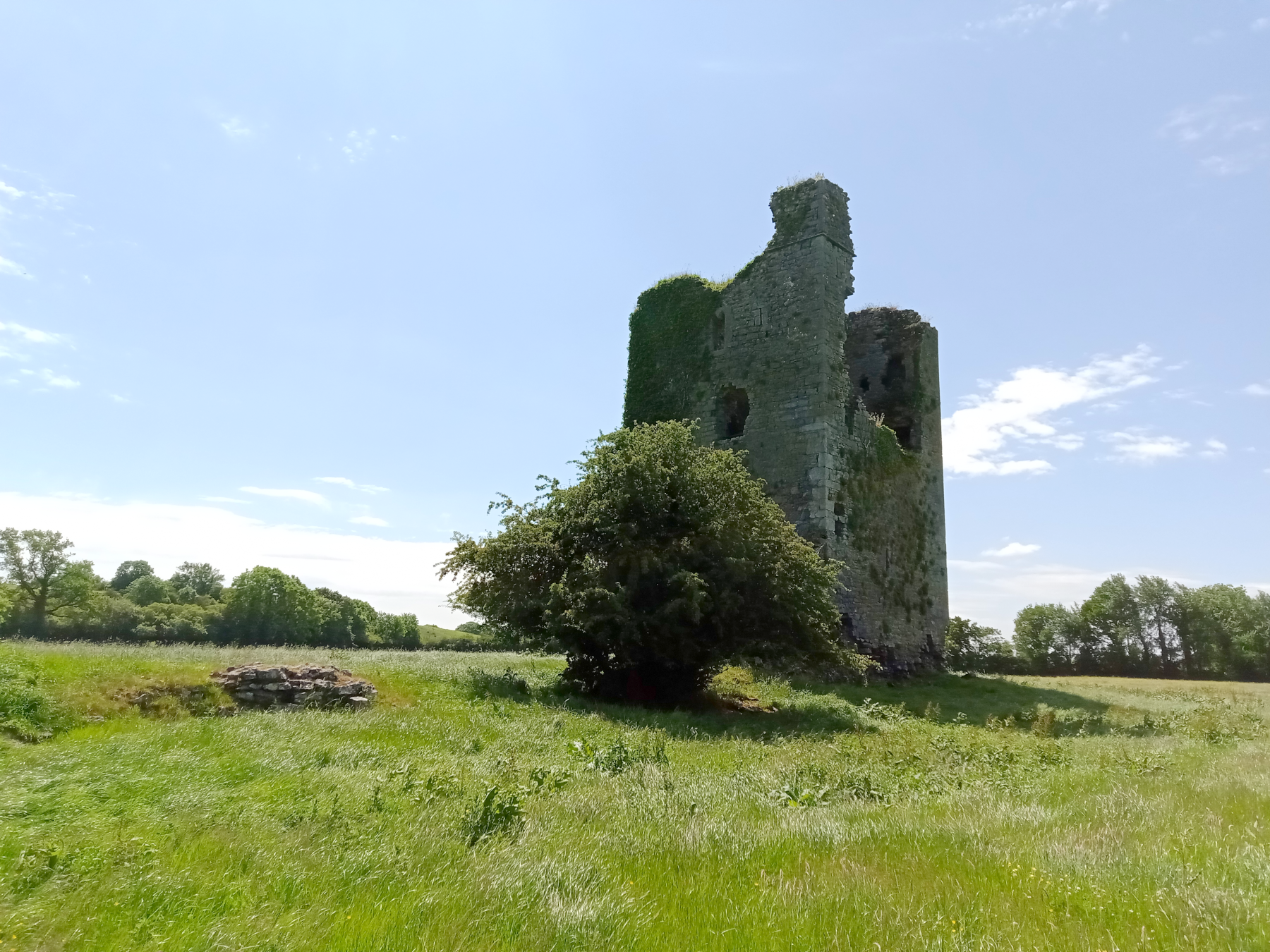
Cantwell's Castle with remains of the bawn wall

The limestone-built castle sits on a partly surviving bawn, the court-yard wall having been almost completely dismantled by 18th century farmer of the land Thomas Cahill. The tower house is four storeys high and measures 10m from north to south, and 8.2m from east to west.

The entrance in the south-east still (or again) has a drawbar in use to secure it and additionally had a yett. The ground floor has two outwardly splaying windows, in the northeastern and northwestern walls. Carrigan says that shows the castle was built when archery was still in practice. One points to an area within the bawn wall, the other one towards a southwesterly direction.

The ground floor has a small fireplace in the northwestern wall, which leads to the presumption that it was used as accommodation. This is rather unusual, because the ground floor of a tower house of this type was usually used for storage. There is also a cupboard in the north corner.

There was another drawbar between the ground and first floor in a Gothic doorway. The first floor has disappeared, but corbel stones still bear witness to its existence. It is thought to have been used for storage.

Two more drawbars, the second in another Gothic doorway, secured the second floor.

The second floor or Hall (still accessible) rests on the vault and also has a fireplace and the garderobe in the northwestern wall.

The third floor (now floorless) contained the main accommodation with another fireplace, two ogee-headed windows and a recess in the south wall which is known as leabha chaol cruadh an Channtulaigh or the hard, narrow bed of Cantwell.

The last floor is the attic, entered through a square-headed door and only accessible crossing the main hall, now floorless. There are window seats in large upper floor windows which still allow for a great view. There are two murder-holes, one between the ground and first floor, the second between the first and second floor.

A wall walk ran on top of the castle.

The staircase is mural, starting left of the entrance door and running clockwise in the walls.

A drawbar slot discovered by a family member of the present owners, stranded in Ireland during the first COVID lockdown, suggests a gate and thus maybe access from a road to the southwest. Another road connecting the castle with the Sandfordscourt Road to the east from left of the house now called "Castle View" is lost, but traces can still be made out in satellite view in the Court Field, and there are four old trees suggesting an entrance into the avenue in the Court Field.

== Gallery ==
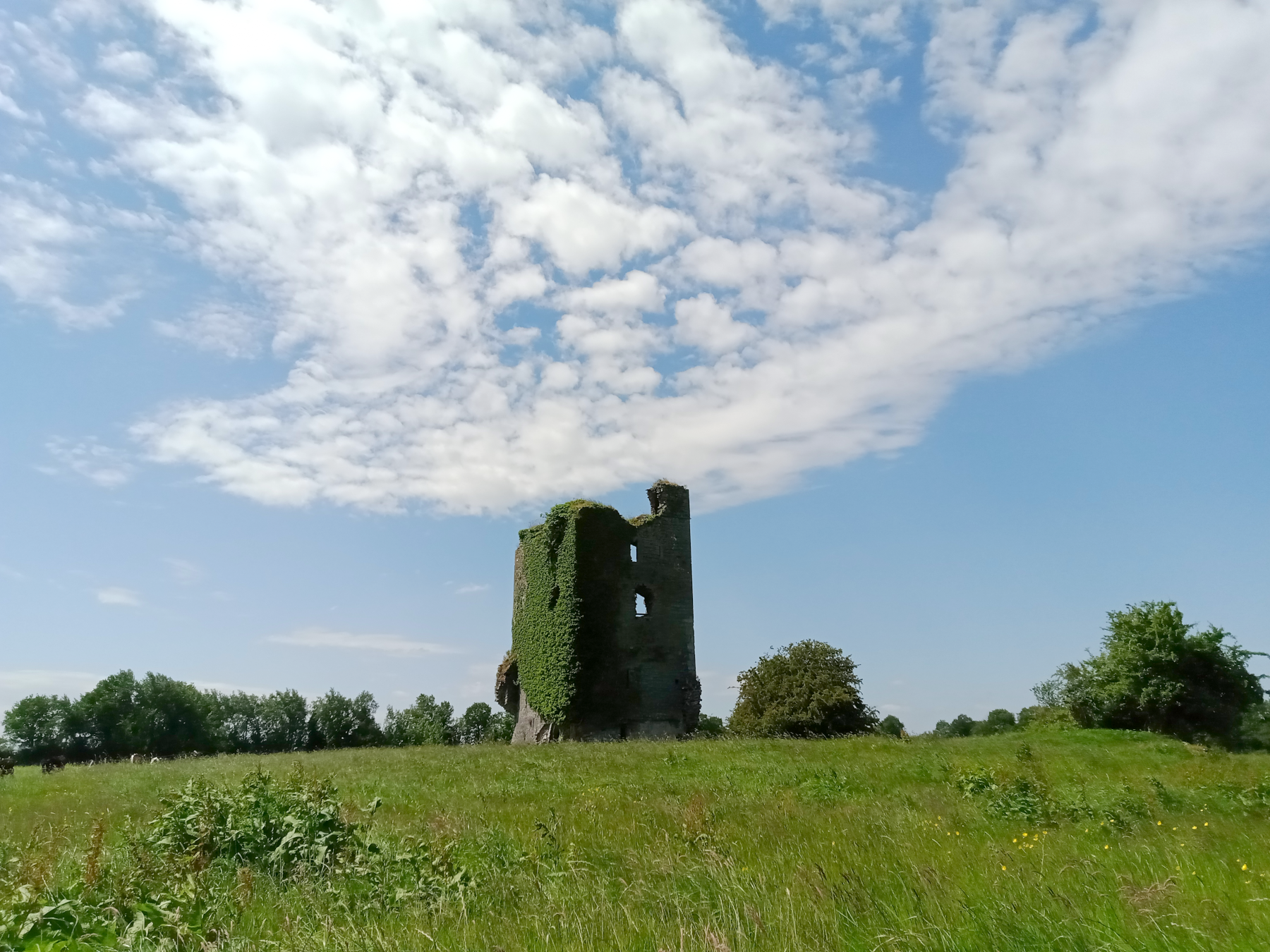
Remains of the bawn

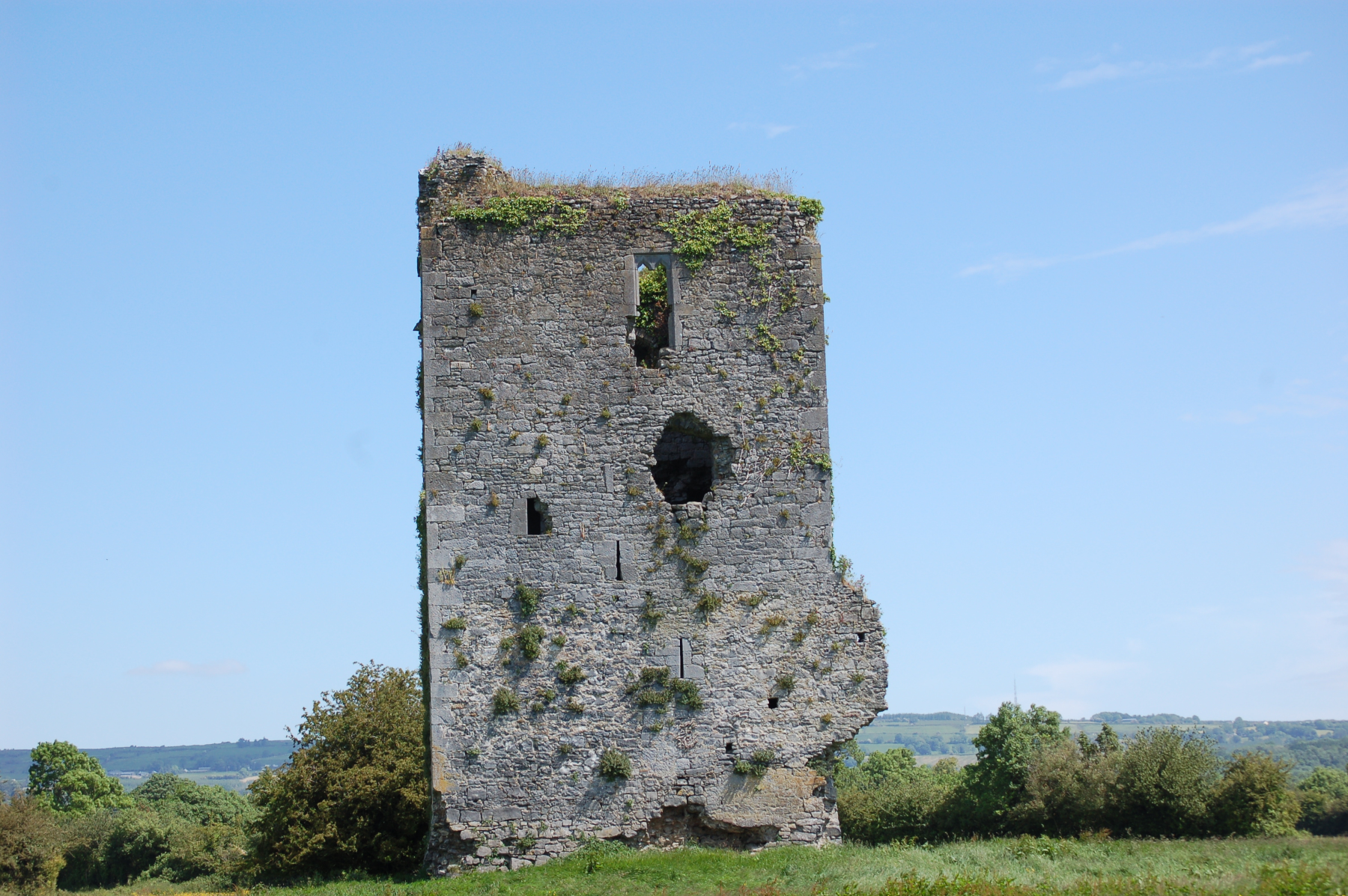
View onto Cantwell's Castle from the Southwest

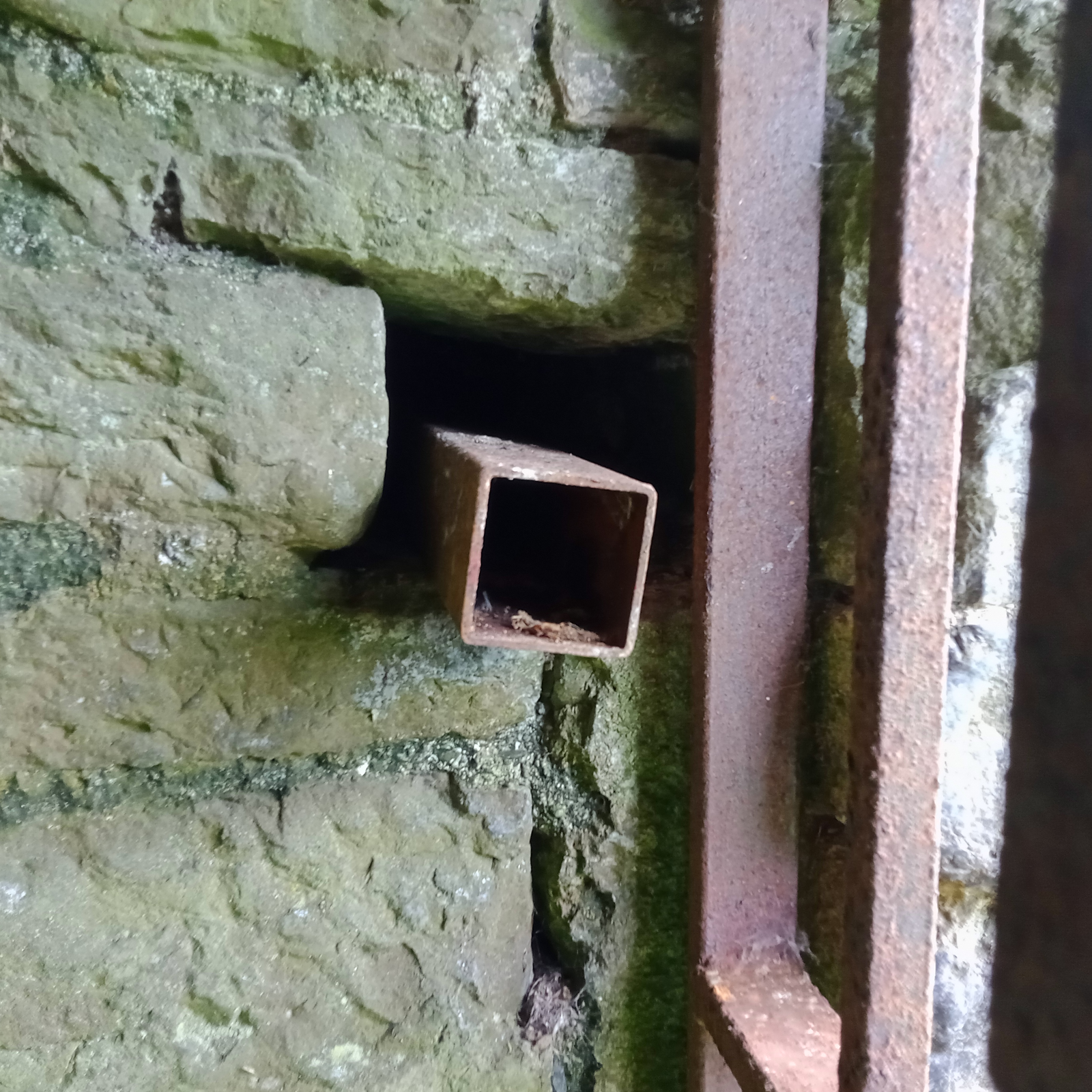
Drawbar slot and drawbar at the entrance doorway

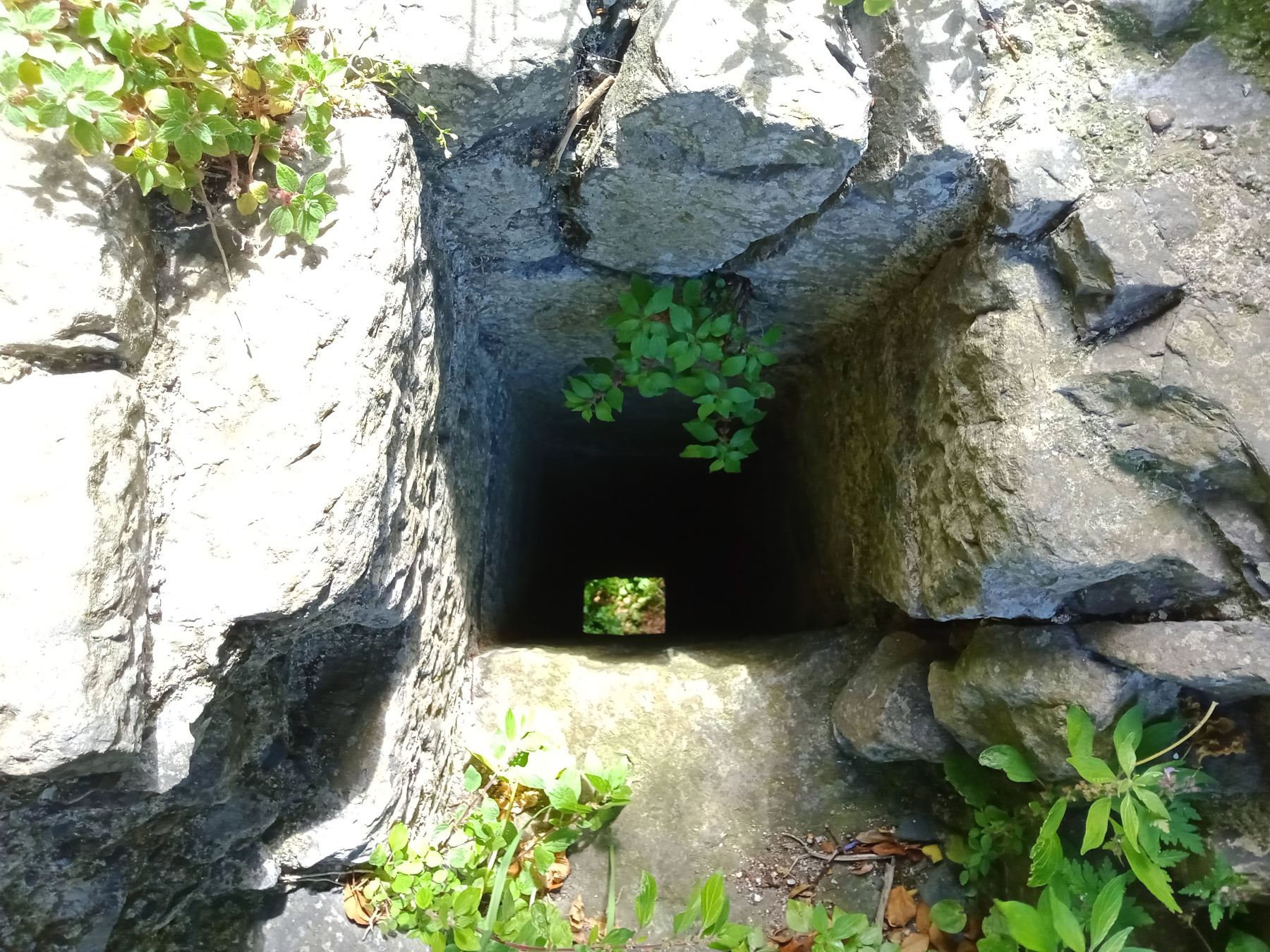
Murder hole leading down to the lobby

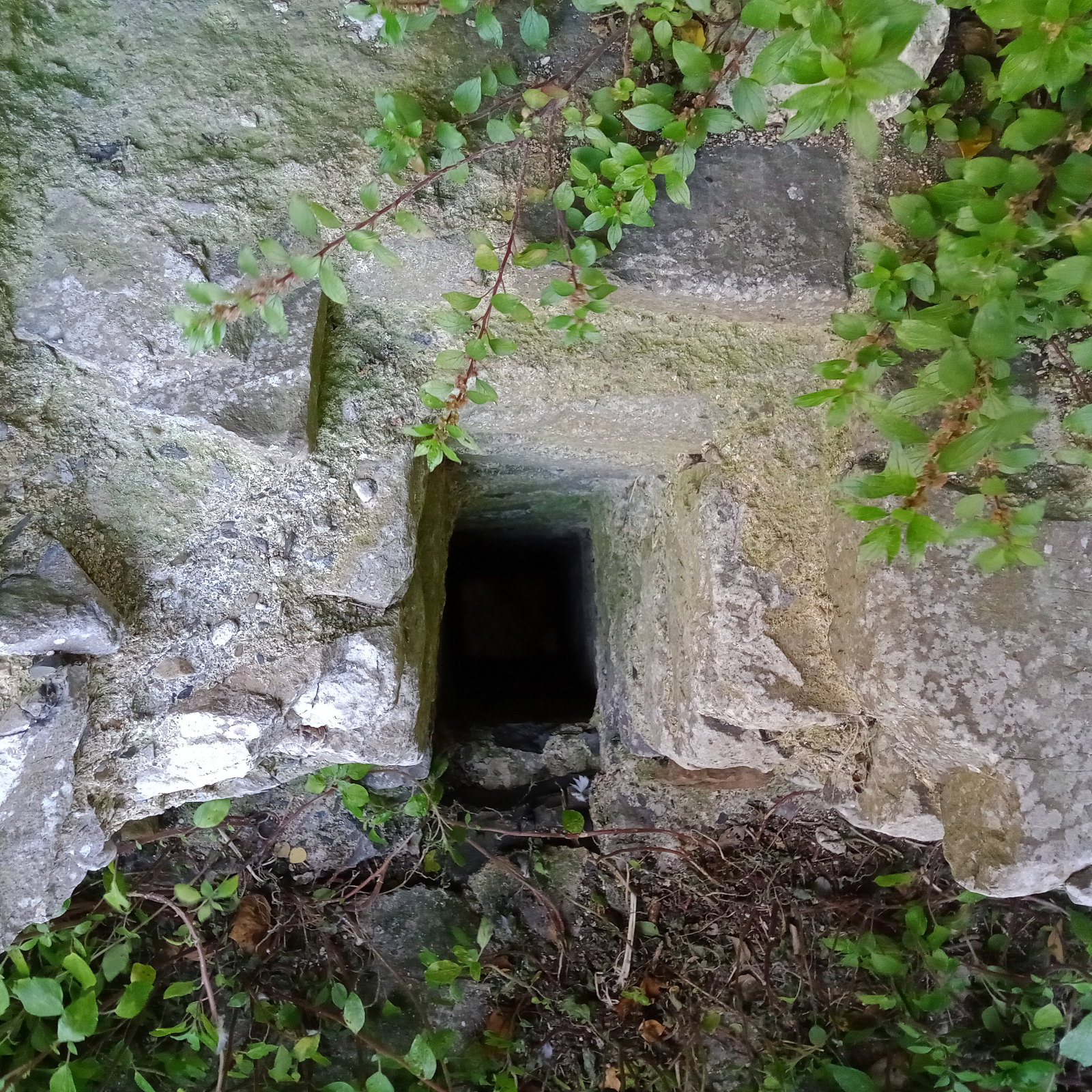
Second murder hole leading down to the entrance onto the first floor

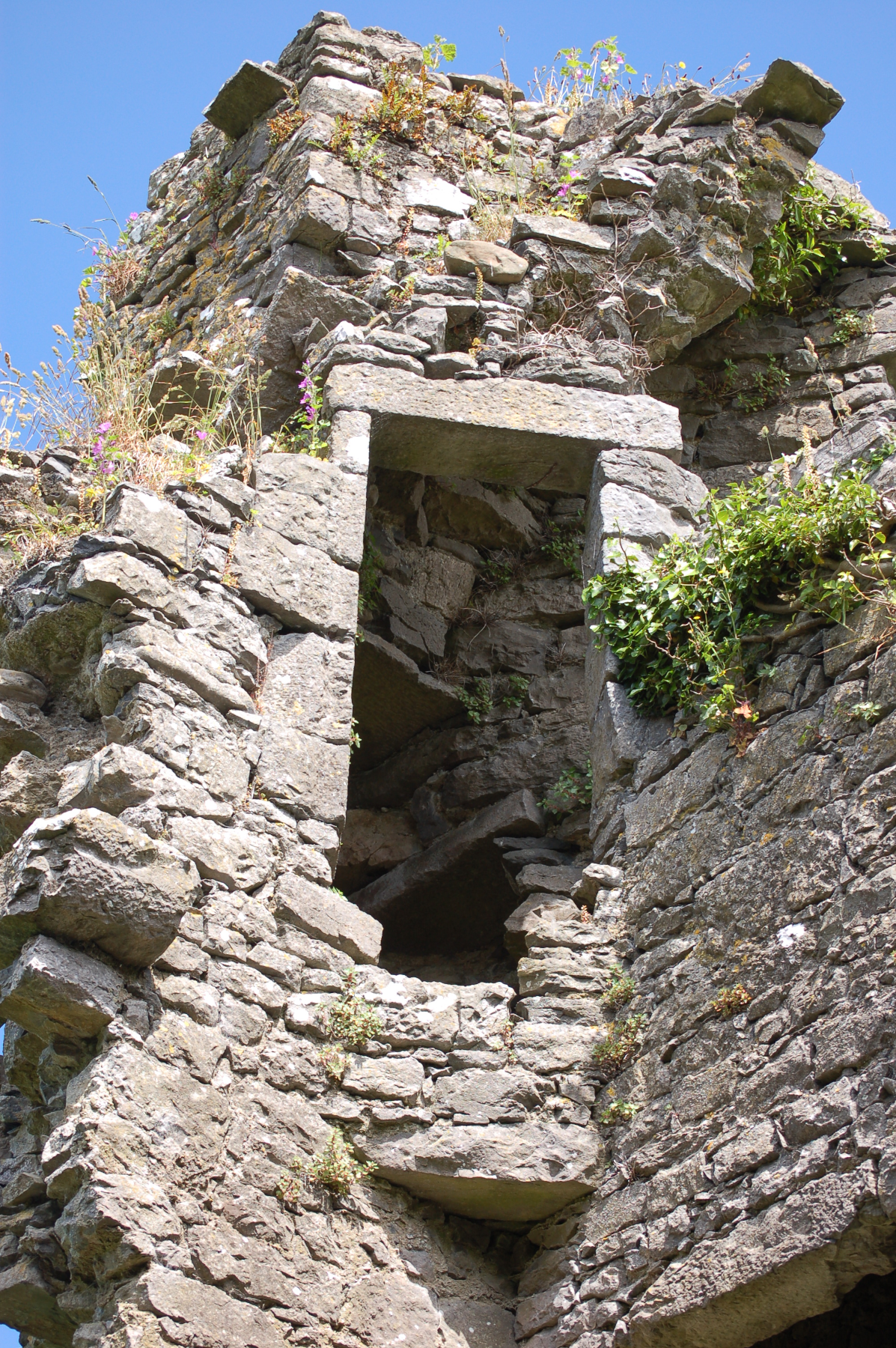
The doorway leading to the wall walk

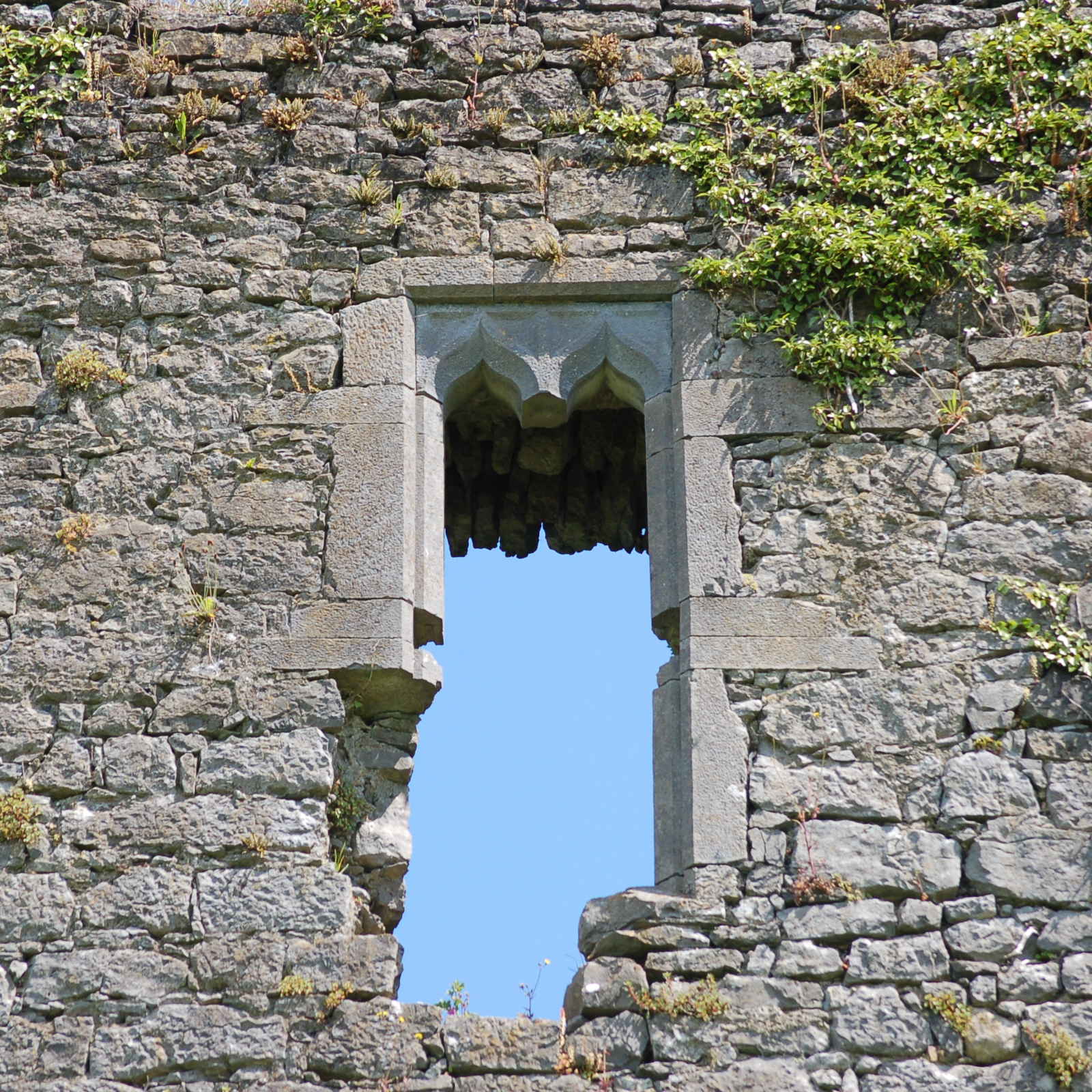
One of the ogee windows

Other Cantwell Castles

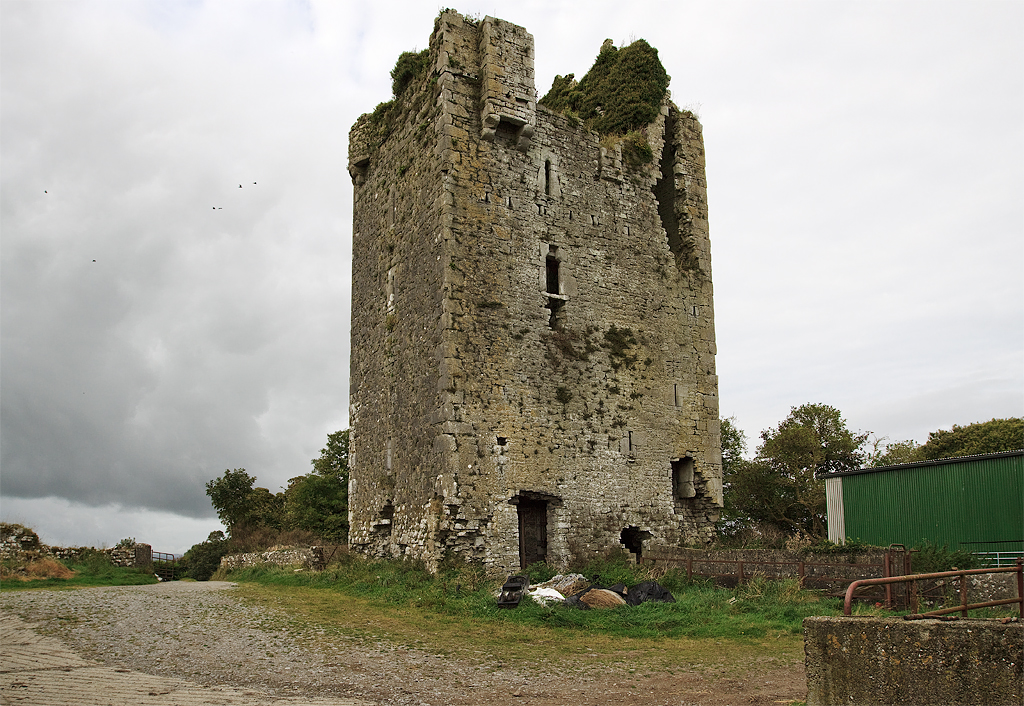
Moycarky Castle

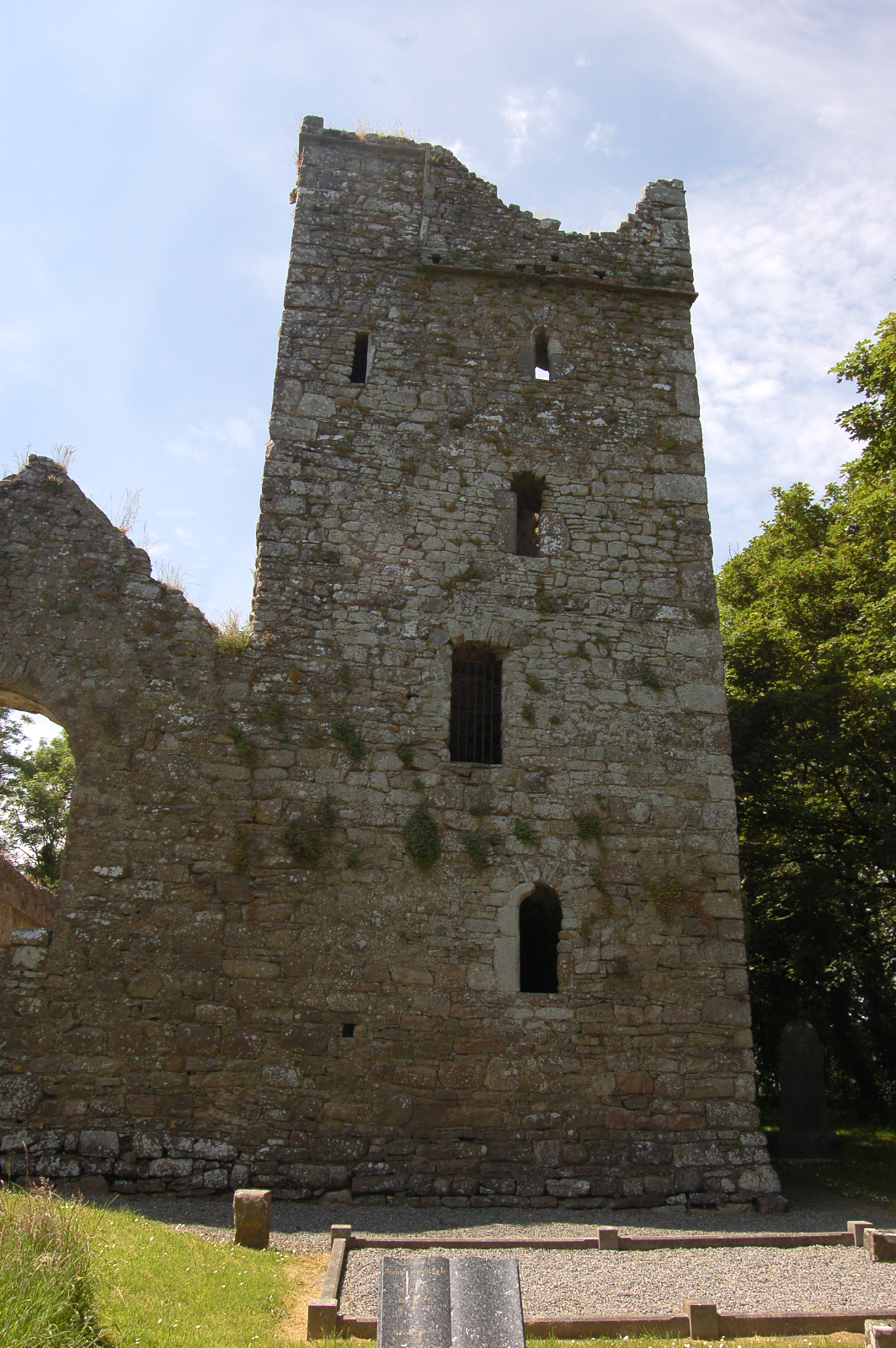
Kilfane Castle, a presbytery attached to Kilfane church

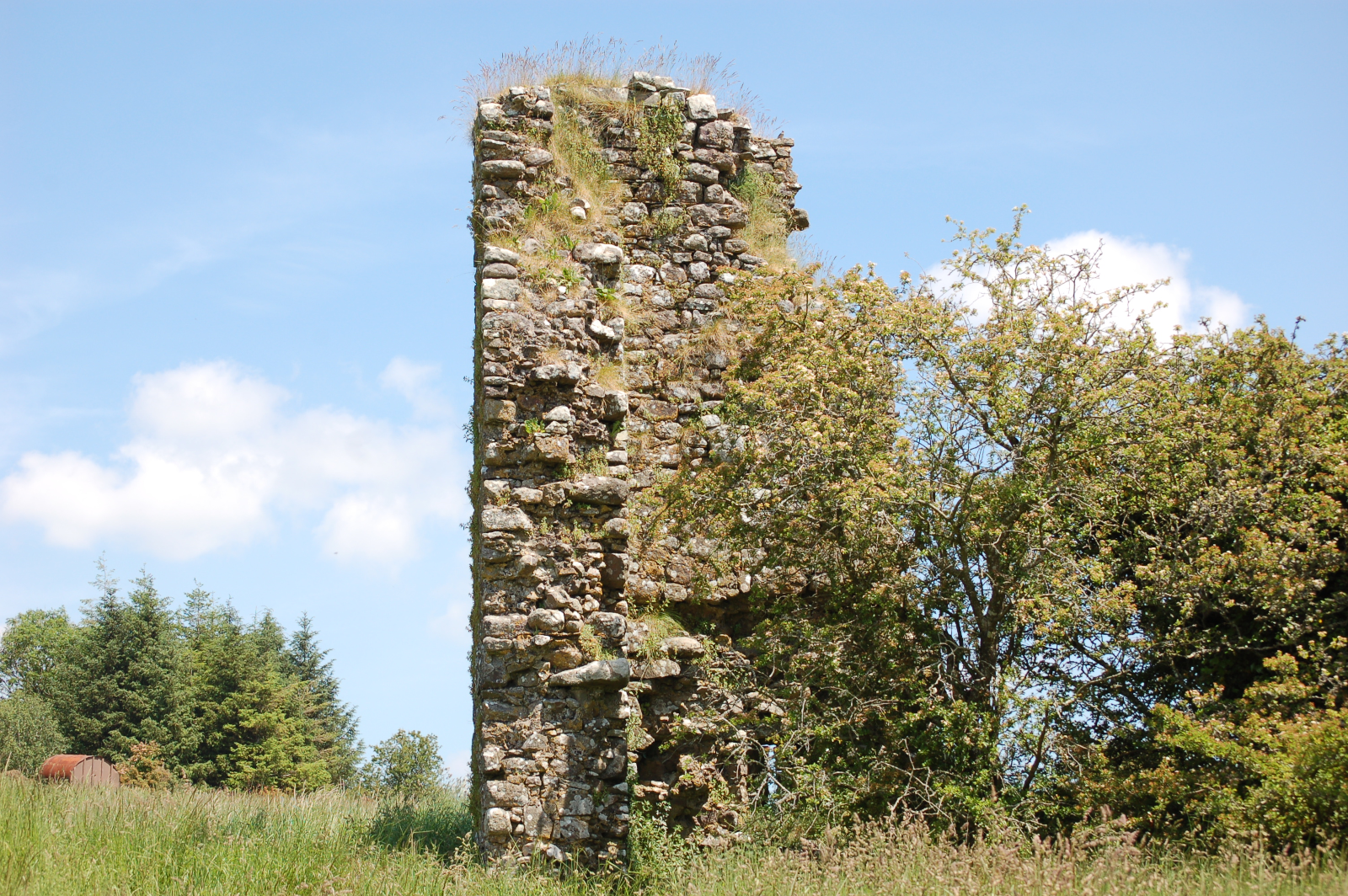
Cloghscregg Castle ruins
