= Cantwell (surname) =

- Language: Latin, Norman French, English, Irish Gaelic

Origin
- Meaning: "of Conteville"
- Region of origin: Ireland, England, Normandy

Cantwell, originally de Conteville, is a surname of Norman origin that is associated with Ireland and England via the Norman invasions. Irish Cantwells are predominantly concentrated in counties Tipperary, Kilkenny and Waterford. The Irish language variant of the name is Cantual or de Cantual. The surname is found across the English speaking world, such as in the United States, Australia, New Zealand, and Canada.

The Cantwell Family Landmarks can be found in Cantwellscourt Ireland with the Cantwell's Castle and the Cantwell Fada the Cantwells are of Irish Catholic Origin.

== People with the surname ==
- Joanne Cantwell, Irish presenter
- Christopher Cantwell (white supremacist) (born 1980)
- Christopher Cantwell (writer), co-creator of the TV series Halt and Catch Fire
- Colin Cantwell (1932–2022), American science fiction concept artist
- Harry A. Cantwell (died 1972), American politician and physician
- Hendrika B. Cantwell (1925–2025), Dutch-American professor of pediatrics, advocate for abused and neglected children
- John Joseph Cantwell (1874–1947), first archbishop of the Roman Catholic Archdiocese of Los Angeles
- John Patrick Cantwell (born 1956), Australian major general
- Kilian Cantwell (born 1995), Irish professional footballer
- Lesley Cantwell (1987–2013), New Zealand racewalker
- Lloyd Cantwell, alias used by Whitaker Chambers (1901–1961) after his friend Robert Cantwell (1908–1978)
- Maria Cantwell (born 1958), American politician from Washington
- Mary Cantwell (1930–2000), American-born journalist and novelist
- Michael J. Cantwell (1837–1903), American politician
- Noel Cantwell (1932–2005), Irish cricketer and football player
- Robert Cantwell (1908–1978), American novelist and critic
- Robert Cantwell (architect) (c. 1793 – 1859), British architect
- Steve Cantwell (born 1986), American mixed martial arts fighter
- Todd Cantwell (born 1998), footballer

== See also ==
- Cantwell (disambiguation)
- Cantwell Fada
- Cantwell's Court
- Herluin de Conteville
