= Moycarkey Castle =

Tower-house castle in County Tipperary, Ireland

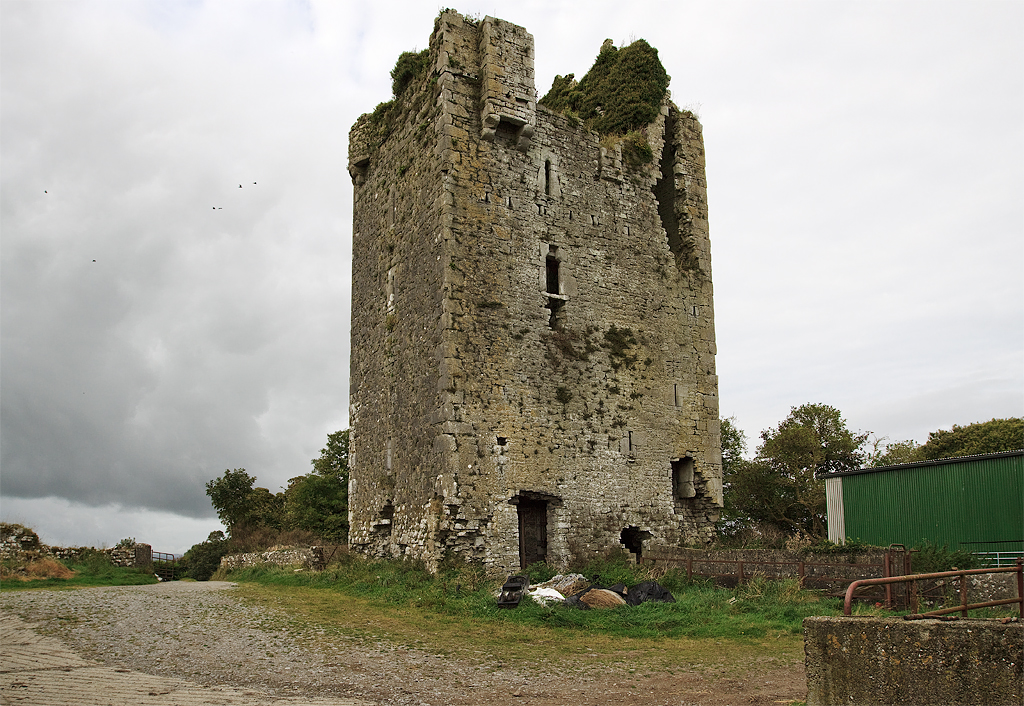
The Castle in 2009

Moycarkey Castle, in Moycarky townland, County Tipperary, is a tower-house located inside a large rectangular bawn with round flanking towers at the north-eastern and south-western corners. The entrance to the tower-house is protected by a double murder-hole.

The castle was the central stronghold of the Cantwell family, underlords of the Butlers of Ormond, who had castles in other places as well, including one at Mellisson in the Slieve Ardagh barony in the townland of Sandfordscourt.

An Edmund Cantwell of Moycarkey Castle had a daughter, Catherine, who married the Hon. John Butler, a son of the second Viscount Mountgarret. A William Cantwell was listed as the proprietor of the castle in 1640.

In 1889, Bassett's directory of the county noted that "[the castle] has a large square tower, with high surrounding wall. A fissure in the tower was caused by lightning over a hundred years ago." and that the ruins were on the estate of a John Max.
