= Paul Helsham =

Paul Helsham (1761 - 1822) was an Anglican priest in the late eighteenth and early nineteenth centuries.

Helsham was born in County Kilkenny. He entered Trinity College, Dublin in 1776 and graduated B.A. in 1781 and M.A. in 1792. The Rector of Kilfane, he was Vicar choral of Kilkenny Cathedral from 1781 to 1796. After that Helsham was appointed Vicar general of the Diocese of Ossory in 1796 and Archdeacon of Ossory in 1801, holding both positions until his death.
