= Drawbar (defense) =

Beam to secure a door

A drawbar securing the north door at the Church of All Saints and St Andrew, Kingston, Cambridgeshire.

A drawbar is a defensive implement used to secure a door or gate in a medieval or Early Modern building such as a castle, but also churches and townhouses.

When drawn across the full length of the door, it prevents the door or gate from being opened. To open the door or gate, the drawbar is pushed into a drawbar slot in the wall. These drawbar slots often survive in buildings from that time, while the bars themselves have usually disappeared. A drawbar was usually set behind an inward-opening door, to resist it being forced by a battering ram or other siege engine.

The use of gunpowder and the possibility to blow up the door rendered them obsolete.

== Gallery ==
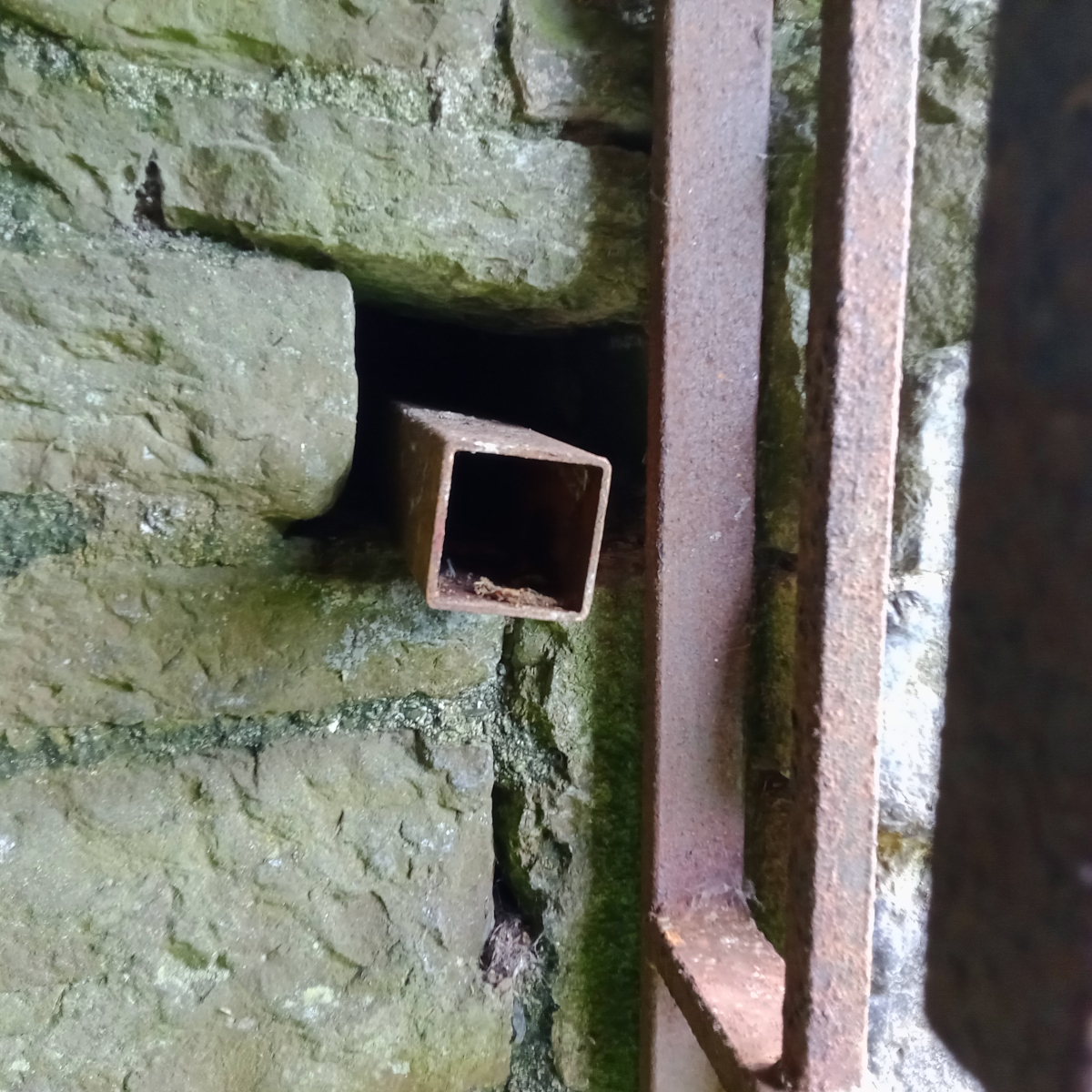
Modern drawbar in a medieval drawbar slot in Cantwell's Castle

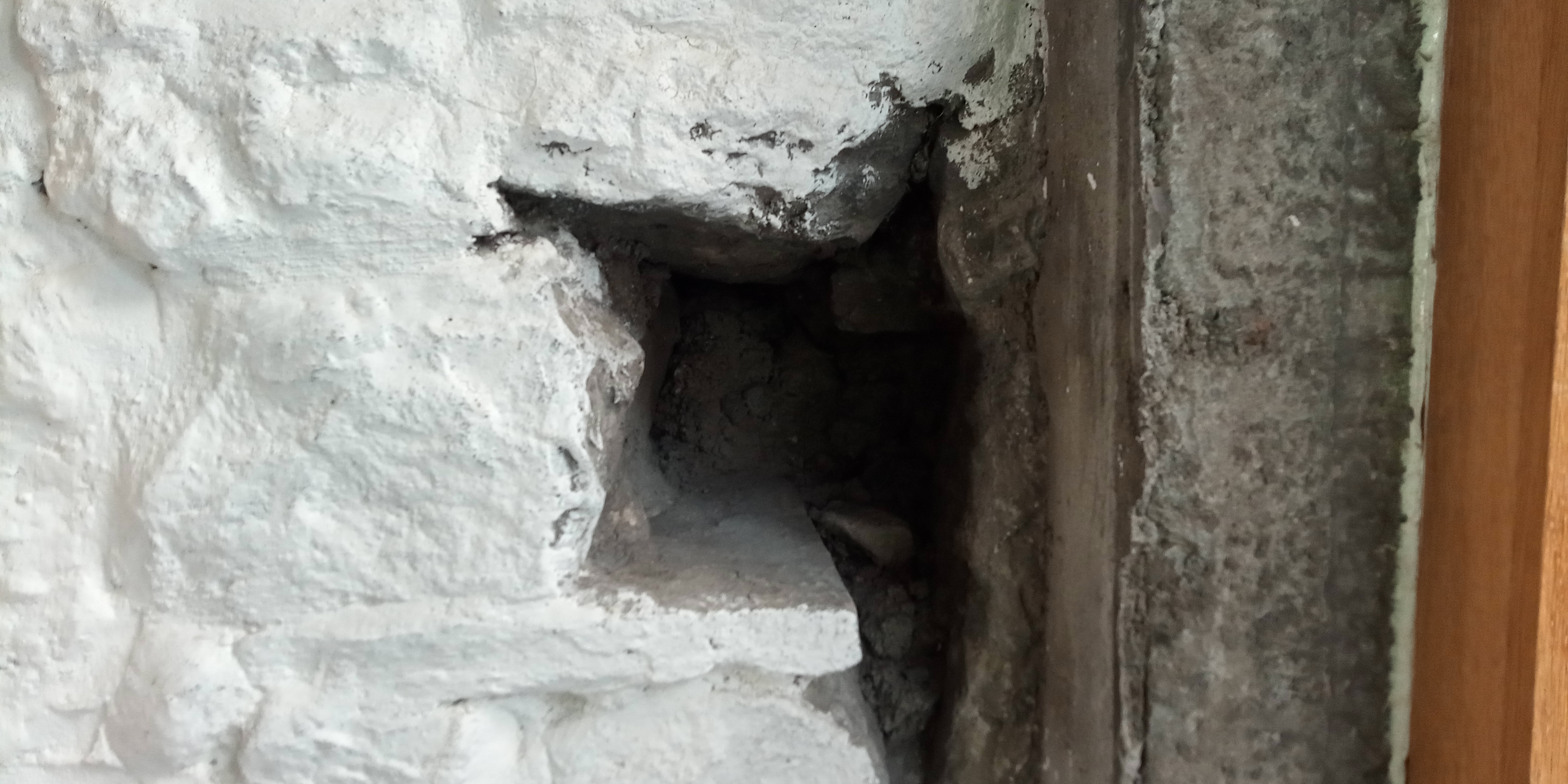
Drawbar slot at Rothe House, an early modern townhouse in Kilkenny

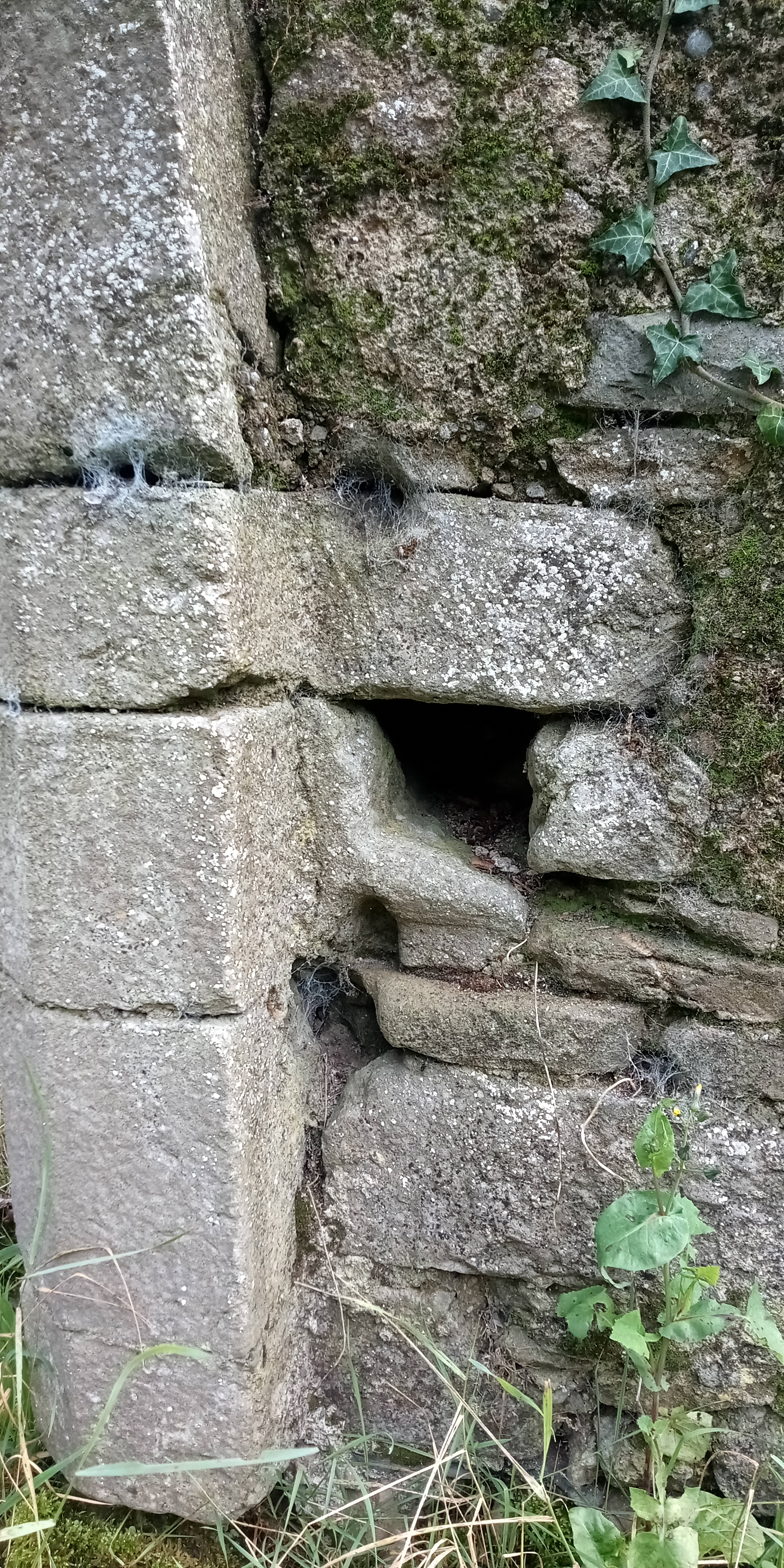
Set of (at least) 3 drawbar slots at Churchclara Church ruin, Co. Kilkenny
