= Cantwell, West Virginia =

Unincorporated community in West Virginia, United States

Cantwell
- Unincorporated community
- Location within the state of West Virginia Cantwell (the United States)
- Coordinates: 39°7′57″N 81°7′52″W
- Country: United States
- State: West Virginia
- County: Ritchie
- Elevation: 1,102 ft (336 m)
- Time zone: UTC-5 (Eastern (EST))
  - Summer (DST): UTC-4 (EDT)
- GNIS ID: 1549619

Cantwell is an unincorporated community in Ritchie County, West Virginia, United States.
