= Conteville =

Conteville is the name or part of the name of several communes in France:

- Conteville, Calvados, in the Calvados département
- Conteville, Eure, in the Eure département
- Conteville, Oise, in the Oise département
- Conteville, Seine-Maritime, in the Seine-Maritime département
- Conteville, Somme, in the Somme département
- Conteville-en-Ternois, in the Pas de Calais département
- Conteville-lès-Boulogne, in the Pas de Calais département

== See also ==
- Odon de Conteville
