= Kilfane Church =

- Cell-Phaain
- Cill Pháin
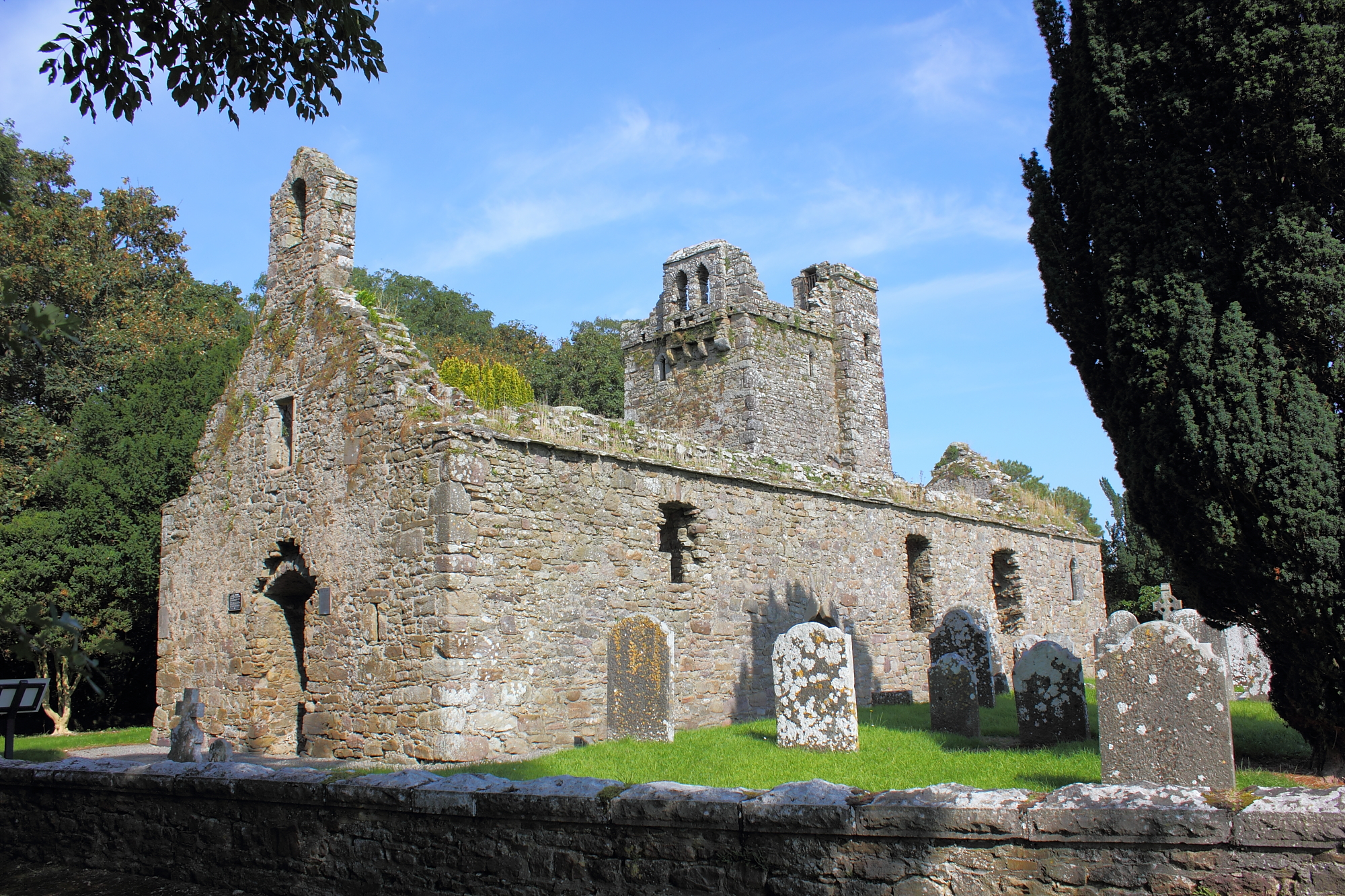

- Location within Ireland
- 52.554167°N 7.118333°W
- Location: Kilfane Demesne, Kilfane, County Kilkenny
- Country: Ireland
- Denomination: Church of Ireland
- Previous denomination: Pre-Reformation Catholic

History
- Founder: Cantwell family

Architecture
- Functional status: inactive
- Heritage designation

National monument of Ireland
- Official name: Kilfane Church
- Reference no.: 300
- Style: Late Gothic
- Years built: 13th century

Specifications
- Length: 22 m (72 ft)
- Width: 7 m (23 ft)
- Materials: stone

Administration
- Diocese: Ossory

Kilfane Church is a medieval church and National Monument in County Kilkenny, Ireland.

== Location ==
Kilfane Church is located, in Kilfane, approximately 3.4 km (2.1 mi) north-northeast of Thomastown, County Kilkenny.

== History ==
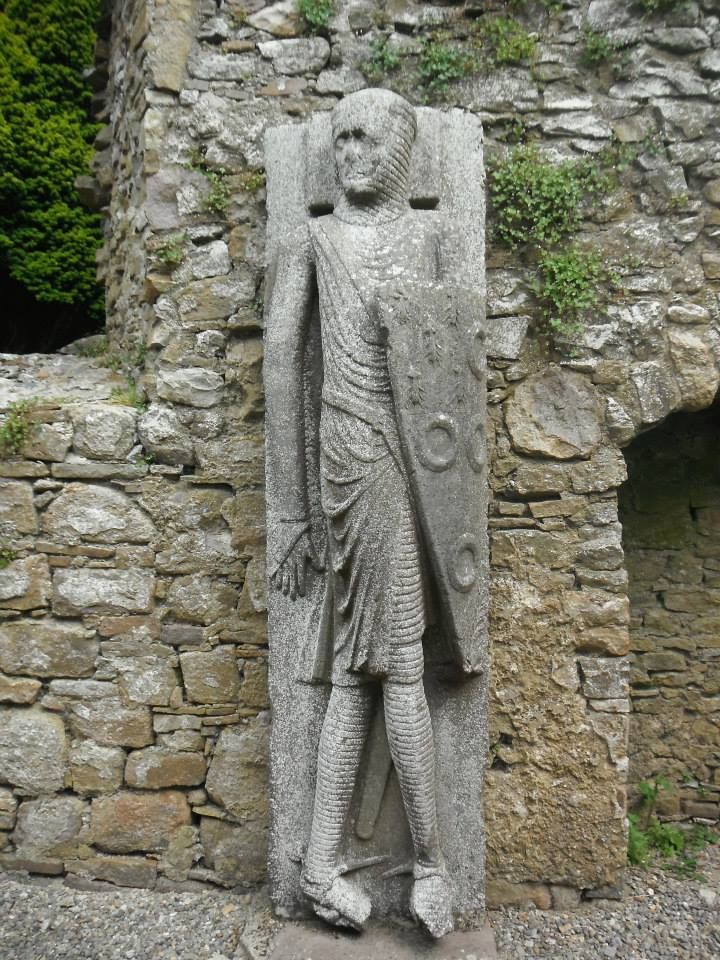
The Cantwell Fada

The area is supposed to derive its name from a Saint Phian.

The church was built in the 13th century. The Cantwells were Lords of Kilfane and adjoining areas from shortly after the Norman conquest to the confiscations following the Confederation.

Poet Deirdre Brennan wrote a poem about Kilfane Church in 2001.

== Church ==
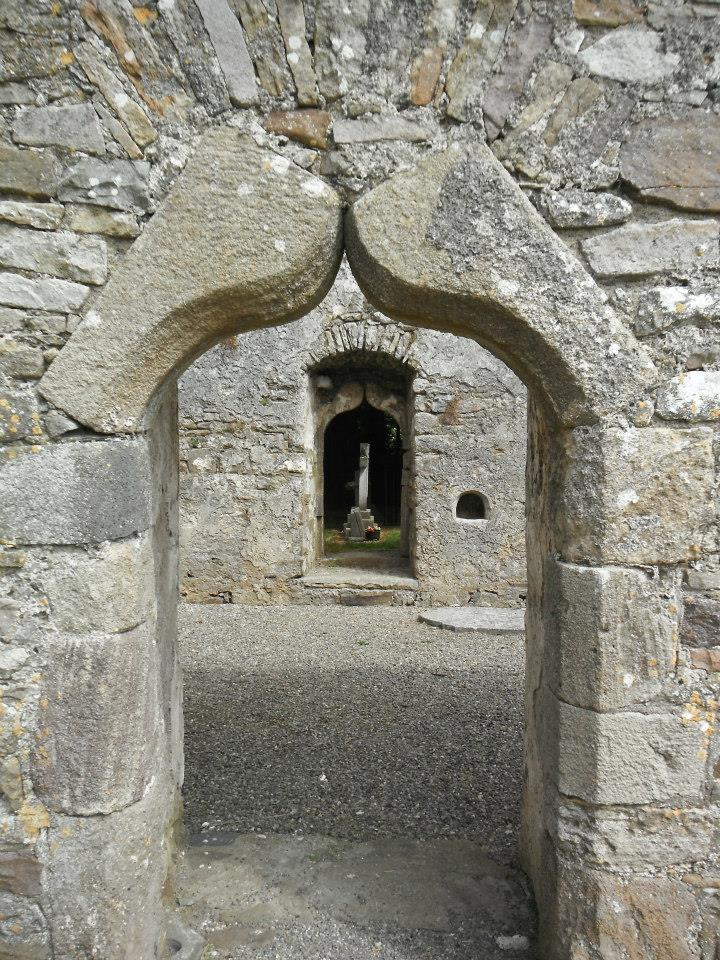
Ogee doorway

Kilfane Church is a long rectangle with sedilia, altar, book rest and piscina. The sedilia are believed to come from an older church and still have some medieval paint. Three original doorways in the north and south walls are headed by ogee stones.

The castellated tower house at the east end may have housed the presbytery/sacristy and provided residents in the upper storeys.

When the new Church of Ireland building was built across the road, the old church found new use as a schoolhouse.

The main feature is the Cantwell Fada, an effigy of a knight from the 1320s/30s; this would have been intended to lie horizontally as a cover to his tomb, but is now set vertically and protected by a transparent cover. When the church was used as a school, misbehaving children were made to kiss the effigy. Later, it had been covered by soil to protect it until 1840, when James Graves uncovered and cleaned it.

Four casts were made; one of them is on display in the National Museum in Dublin.
