= Cantwells Run =

Stream in Coshocton County, Ohio, U.S.

Coordinates: 40°16′15″N 81°52′32″W

Cantwells Run is a stream in Coshocton County, in the U.S. state of Ohio.

Cantwells Run was named for Thomas Cantwell, a pioneer who settled there about 1806.

== See also ==
- List of rivers of Ohio
