= Kilfane =

Kilfane Cill Pháin
- Townland
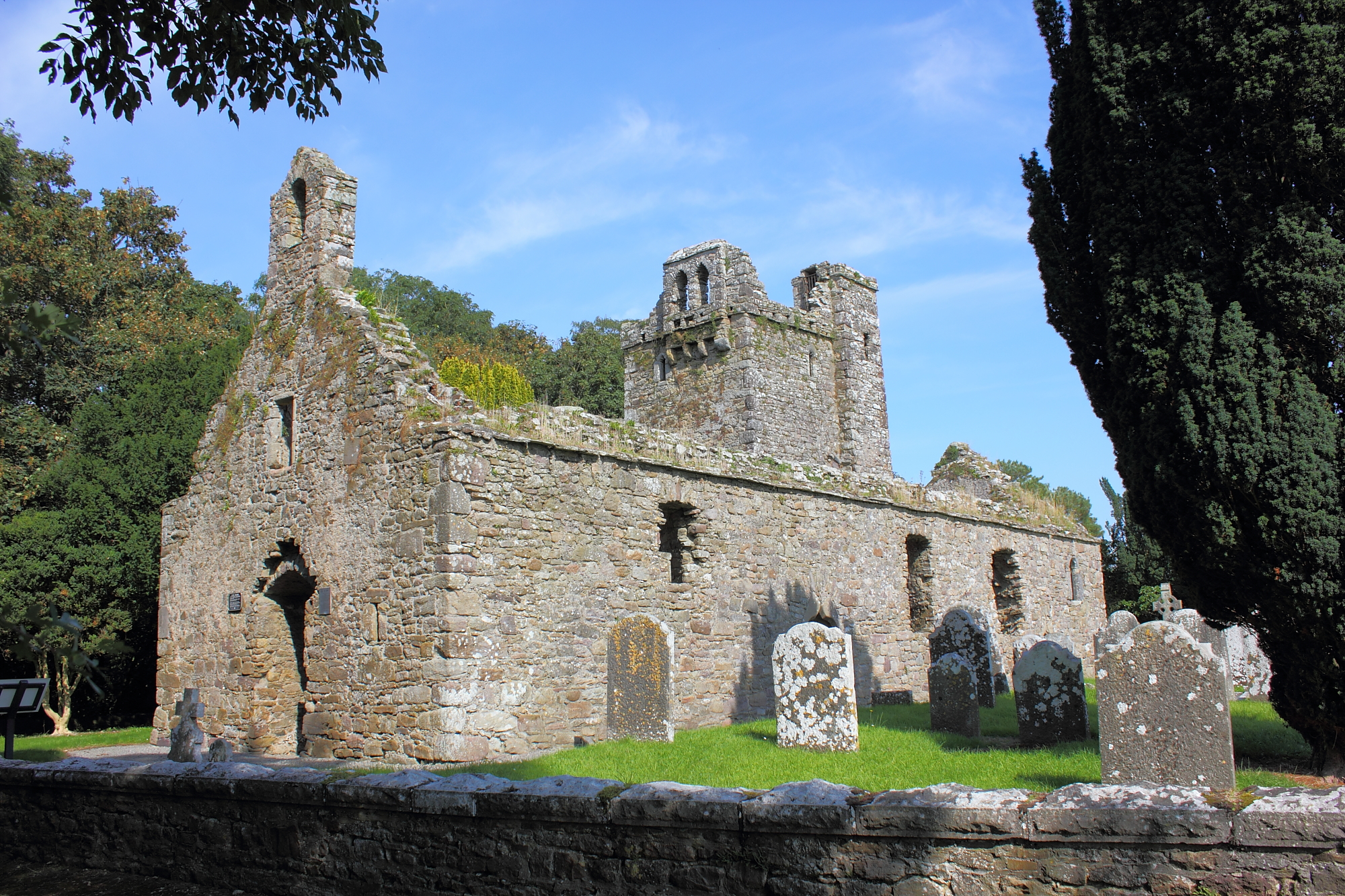
- Kilfane Church

- Location in Ireland
- Coordinates: 52°33′25″N 7°08′34″W
- Country: Ireland
- Province: Leinster
- County: County Kilkenny
- barony: Gowran
- Civil parish: Kilfane

Government
  - Type: County Council
  - Body: Kilkenny County Council
- Time zone: UTC+0 (WET)
  - Summer (DST): UTC-1 (IST / WEST)
- Irish Grid Reference: S 59 45

Kilfane (Irish: Cill Pháin) is a combination of two townlands located outside of Thomastown in County Kilkenny, Ireland. It is made up of the townlands of Kilfane East and West with a total area of 75 acres (0.30 km^{2}). Located in the barony of Gowran, Kilfane gives its name to the wider civil parish which contains 16 townlands. It is in the Roman Catholic parish of Tullaherin.

This is also the site of the 13th-century Kilfane Church, now in ruins, which has an adjoining castellated presbytery or stone house. The site has traces of original consecration crosses, ogee headed doorways, remains of an altar, sedilia and book rest. Inside the ruined church, on the North wall, is an effigy of a Norman knight in full armour. It is referred to as Cantwell Fada and this effigy is the tallest of its kind in Britain or Ireland.

Kilfane House was the seat of the Power family who were responsible for the creation of Kilfane Glen and Waterfall which is now a tourist attraction containing a romantic era (Romanticism) garden and waterfall

There is also a Gaelic handball alley constructed in Kilfane quarry in the 1920s
