= Rathcoole, County Kilkenny =

Parish in County Kilkenny, Ireland

Rathcoole is a parish in County Kilkenny. It does not give its name to any townland, but the first church there is believed to have been Teampall Ráth chúil. The parish consists of the following towlands:

- Agha
- Carrigeen
- Cassagh
- Coolbrican (Coolbricken)
- Johnswell
- Knocknaguppoge
- Mountnugent Lower
- Mountnugent Upper
- Sandfordscourt
- Tullabrin (Tullowbrin)
