= Sandfordscourt =

Townland in Rathcoole, County Kilkenny, Ireland

Coordinates: 52.6853°N 7.1951°W

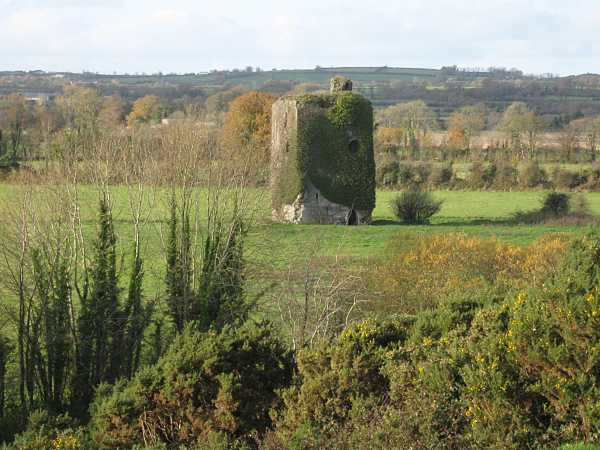
Ruin of Cantwell's Castle in Sandfordscourt townland

Sandfordscourt (formerly "Cantwell's Court") is a townland in the civil parish of Rathcoole within the historical barony of Gowran, County Kilkenny, Ireland. Sandfordscourt townland is approximately 597.7 acres (2.4 km^{2}) in area. As of the 2011 census, it contained 7 occupied households.

Cantwell's Castle, a ruined tower house, is located in the townland.

== See also ==
- List of townlands in County Kilkenny
