= Cantwell Fada =

Sculpture in County Kilkenny, Ireland

- Long Man of Kilfane
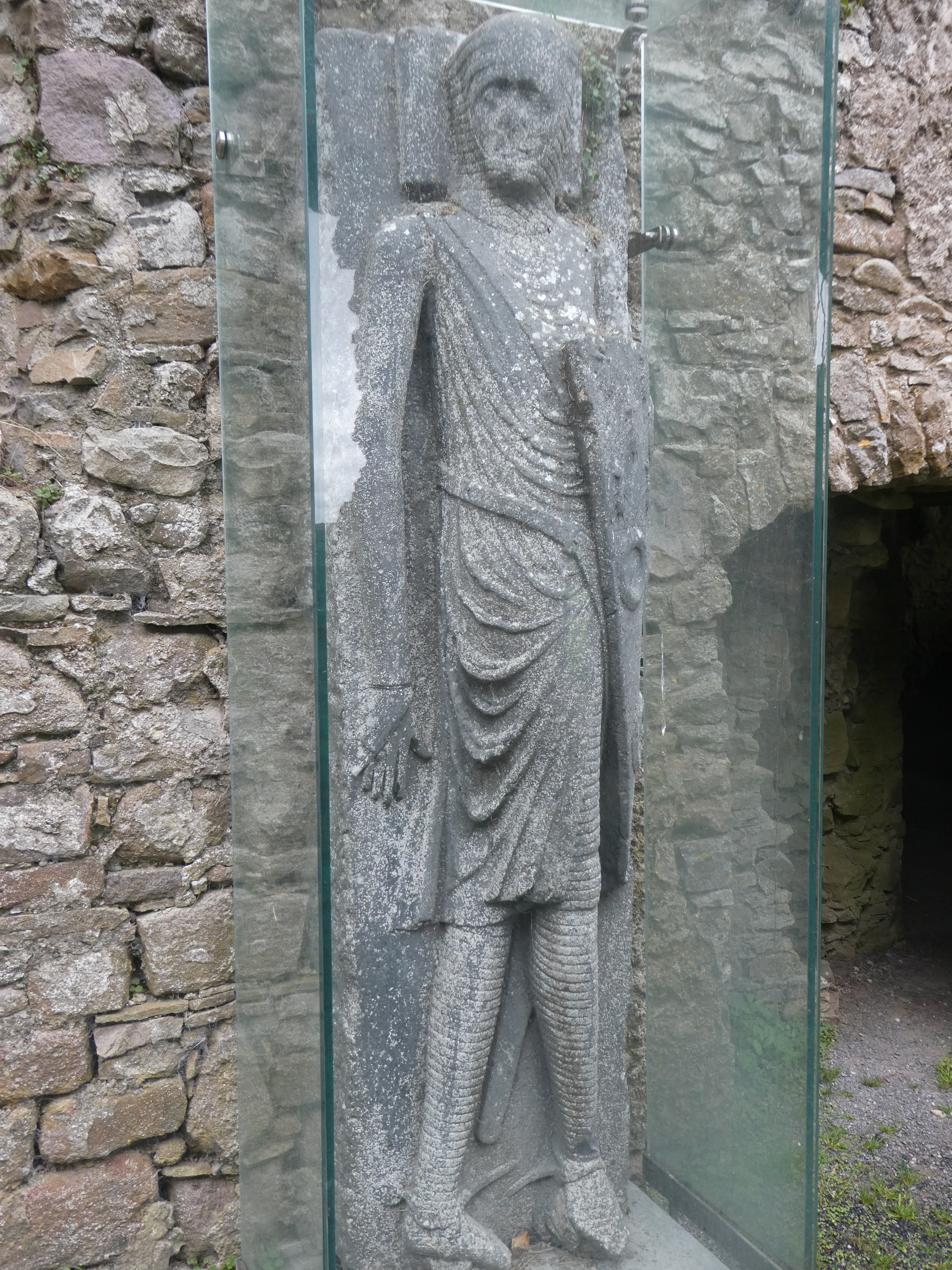
- Artist: Unknown
- Year: c. 1330
- Type: limestone
- Dimensions: 243 cm (95.5 in)
- Location: Kilfane Church, Ireland; 52.554197°N 7.118217°W

The knight holds a shield with the Cantwell arms: Gules five annulets and a canton ermine.

The Cantwell Fada (lit. 'the long/tall (fada) Cantwell'; also known as the Long Man) is an effigy of a knight on display in the ruins of the 14th-century Kilfane Church in Kilfane near Thomastown in County Kilkenny, Ireland.

The effigy is carved from a single slab of limestone. The knight wears a mail coif and a mail hauberk protecting his torso as far as his knees. It is under a cloth surcoat with deep folds and a arming sword in scabbard with sword belt. He has prominent spurs on his feet, showing that he fought on horseback. His legs are crossed, the right leg over the left. This was formerly believed to show that he was a participant in the Crusades, but is now considered a stylistic convention. In the left hand is carried a large shield bearing the arms of the Cantwell family.

It is believed to represent Thomas de Cantwell (d. 1319), a Cambro-Norman adventurer who became Lord of Kilfane. The Cantwell family's main castle was Cantwell's Castle in Sandfordscourt.

The stone effigy is thought to originally have been a sarcophagus slab which has since been set upright against an inner wall of the church. The statue represents an example of the high standard achieved by Irish sculptural workshops in the Pale prior to a cultural and economic decline marked by the Edward Bruce invasion and the arrival of the Black Death.

Hubert Butler, essayist, recalled the local tale that children at the nearby Protestant school were sometimes punished by having to kiss the statue.

Nearby is The Longman of Kilfane, a public house and restaurant named for the Cantwell Fada.
