= Mellisson =

Mellison
- townland
- Location in Ireland
- Coordinates: 52.62960°N 7.61470°W
- Country: Ireland
- Province: Munster
- County: County Tipperary

Mellisson is a townland in the civil parish of Buolick in the barony of Slievardagh in County Tipperary.

At the time of the 1911 census there were fourteen households in the townland.
